= Bouldering at the 2026 World Climbing Series =

- Location: Keqiao, China; Bern, Switzerland Madrid, Spain; Prague, Czech Republic; Innsbruck, Austria Salt Lake City, United States
- Dates: 1 May – 18 October 2026

Champions
- Men: (Japan) Sorato Anraku
- Women: (United Kingdom) Erin McNeice

The 2026 season of the World Climbing Series was the 27th season of the competition. Bouldering competitions were held at six stops. The bouldering season began on May 1 at the World Climbing Series in Keqiao, and will conclude on October 18 with in Salt Lake City. At each stop, a qualifying round was held on the first day of the competition, and the semi-final and final rounds were held on the second day. The winners were awarded trophies, and the top three finishers received medals. At the end of the season, the overall rankings were determined by the total number of points athletes earned for finishing within the top 40 of each individual event.

== Overview ==
| Date | Location | Routesetters* | Men | Women |
|---|---|---|---|---|
| May, 1-3 | Keqiao, China | (France) **Remi Samyn**; (Italy) Stefan Scarperi; (Japan) Tsukuru Hori | (Japan) Sorato Anraku | (France) Zélia Avezou |
| May, 22-24 | Bern, Switzerland | (Japan) **Gen Hirashima**; (United Kingdom) Max Ayrton; (France) Maelys Agrapart | (Japan) Sorato Anraku | (Australia) Oceana Mackenzie |
| May, 28-31 | Madrid, Spain | (Japan) **Tsukuru Hori**; (Italy) Anna Borella; (Japan) Tsukasa Mizuguchi | (Japan) Sorato Anraku | (United Kingdom) Erin McNeice |
| June, 3-7 | Prague, Czech Republic | (France) **Remi Samyn**; (Argentina) Mauro Schwaszta; (France) Maelys Agrapart | (Japan) Sorato Anraku | (United States) Annie Sanders |
| June, 17-21 | Innsbruck, Austria | (Japan) **Gen Hirashima**; (Italy) Anna Borella; (Poland) Tomasz Oleksy | (Japan) Sorato Anraku | (United States) Annie Sanders |
| October, 16-18 | Salt Lake City, United States | (United Kingdom) **Max Ayrton**; (Japan) Tsukuru Hori; (Japan) Tsukasa Mizuguchi; (Australia) Jordan Grant | (Israel) Yonatan Katz | (France) Oriane Bertone |
| **OVERALL WINNERS** | | | (Japan) **Sorato Anraku** | (United Kingdom) **Erin McNeice** |
| **NATIONAL TEAM** | | | **Japan** | |

* Chief routesetters are in bold.

== Overall ranking ==
The overall ranking is determined based upon points, which athletes are awarded for finishing in the top 40 of each individual event. The national ranking is the sum of the points of that country's three best male and female athletes. Results displayed (in brackets) are not counted.

=== Men ===
The results of the twenty most successful athletes of the Bouldering World Climbing Series 2026:

| Rank | Name | Points | Keqiao | Bern | Madrid | Prague | Innsbruck | Salt Lake City |
|---|---|---|---|---|---|---|---|---|
| 1 | (Japan) Sorato Anraku | 5049 | 1. 1000 | 1. 1000 | 1. 1000 | 1. 1000 | 1. 1000 | 29. 48.7 |
| 2 | (South Korea) Lee Dohyun | 3095 | 2. 805 | 18. 185 | 4. 610 | 2. 805 | 3. 690 | - |
| 3 | (France) Mejdi Schalck | 2900 | 3. 690 | 2. 805 | 10. 350 | 3. 690 | 29. 52 | 11. 313 |
| 4 | (Japan) Rei Kawamata | 2660 | 12. 300 | 11. 325 | 15. 240 | 12. 300 | 2. 805 | 3. 690 |
| 5 | (United Kingdom) Maximillian Milne | 2442 | 22. 130 | 6. 495 | 29. 52 | 5. 545 | 8. 415 | 2. 805 |
| 6 | (Belgium) Hannes Van Duysen | 2345 | 7. 455 | 3. 690 | 9. 380 | 11. 325 | 6. 495 | - |
| 7 | (Japan) Sohta Amagasa | 2083 | 19. 170 | 4. 610 | 27. 68 | 19. 170 | 7. 455 | 4. 610 |
| 8 | (United States) Colin Duffy | 2018 | - | 8. 415 | 2. 805 | 9. 380 | 21. 137.5 | 13. 280 |
| 9 | (China) Pan Yufei | 1855 | 5. 545 | 25. 89.5 | 12. 300 | 10. 350 | 10. 350 | 16. 220 |
| 10 | (Israel) Adi Bark | 1624 | 20. 155 | 5. 545 | 11. 325 | 41. 13.5 | 11. 325 | 14. 260 |
| 11 | (Japan) Tomoa Narasaki | 1515 | 4. 610 | 15. 240 | 21. 145 | 15. 240 | 13. 280 | - |
| 12 | (France) Samuel Richard | 1506 | 27. 68 | 17. 205 | 3. 690 | 20. 155 | 9. 380 | 49. 8 |
| 13 | (France) Max Bertone | 1480 | 10. 350 | - | 25. 89.5 | 6. 495 | - | 5. 545 |
| 14 | (France) Sam Avezou | 1460 | - | - | - | 4. 610 | 4. 610 | 15. 240 |
| 15 | (South Korea) Chon Jong-won | 1403 | 8. 415 | 20. 155 | 27. 68 | 16. 170 | 5. 455 | - |
| 16 | (Japan) Keita Dohi | 1342 | 11. 325 | 23. 120 | 5. 545 | 29. 52 | 12. 300 | - |
| 17 | (United Kingdom) Jack Macdougall | 1322 | 15. 230 | 10.350 | 20. 155 | 33. 31.5 | 17. 205 | 10. 350 |
| 18 | (Spain) Guillermo Peinado Franganillo | 1187 | 45. 10.5 | 12. 290 | 6. 495 | 17. 205 | 39. 16 | 19. 170 |
| 19 | (United Kingdom) Dayan Akhtar | 1166 | 24. 105 | - | 8. 415 | 18. 185 | 55. 6 | 7. 455 |
| 20 | (Israel) Yonatan Katz | 1000 | - | - | - | - | - | 1. 1000 |

=== Women ===
The results of the twenty most successful athletes of the Bouldering World Climbing Series 2026:

| Rank | Name | Points | Keqiao | Bern | Madrid | Prague | Innsbruck | Salt Lake City |
|---|---|---|---|---|---|---|---|---|
| 1 | (United Kingdom) Erin McNeice | 4545 | 11. 325 | 2. 805 | 1. 1000 | 2. 805 | 2. 805 | 2. 805 |
| 2 | (Australia) Oceana Mackenzie | 4080 | 3. 690 | 1. 1000 | 5. 545 | 5. 545 | 3. 690 | 4. 610 |
| 3 | (United States) Annie Sanders | 3755 | 4. 610 | 3. 690 | - | 1. 1000 | 1. 1000 | 7. 455 |
| 4 | (France) Oriane Bertone | 3560 | 5. 545 | 7. 455 | 3. 690 | 11. 325 | 5. 545 | 1. 1000 |
| 5 | (Japan) Melody Sekikawa | 3165 | 7. 455 | 5. 545 | 2. 805 | 4. 610 | 17. 205 | 5. 545 |
| 6 | (China) Zhang Yuetong | 2625 | 9. 380 | 15. 240 | 9. 380 | 3. 690 | 4. 610 | 11. 325 |
| 7 | (Japan) Mao Nakamura | 2472 | 32. 37 | 6. 495 | 7. 455 | 6. 495 | 12. 300 | 3. 690 |
| 8 | (France) Zélia Avezou | 2410 | 1. 1000 | 11. 325 | - | 7. 455 | 13. 280 | 10. 350 |
| 9 | (Japan) Anon Matsufuji | 2260 | 10. 350 | 25. 89.5 | 4. 610 | 8. 415 | 9. 380 | 8. 415 |
| 10 | (Israel) Ayala Kerem | 2165 | - | 9. 380 | 6. 495 | 12. 300 | 6. 495 | 6. 495 |
| 11 | (United Kingdom) Emma Edwards | 1840 | 6. 495 | 13. 280 | 14. 260 | 16. 220 | 11. 325 | 14. 260 |
| 12 | (Italy) Camilla Moroni | 1810 | 15. 240 | 10. 350 | 8. 415 | 10. 350 | 7. 455 | - |
| 13 | (France) Lily Abriat | 1463 | 16. 203.33 | 14. 260 | 16. 220 | 15. 240 | 15. 240 | 12. 300 |
| 14 | (Japan) Futaba Ito | 1288 | 19. 162.5 | 22. 130 | 12. 300 | 13. 280 | 8. 415 | - |
| 15 | (United States) Melina Costanza | 1055 | 13. 270 | 21. 145 | 15. 240 | 37. 20 | - | 9. 380 |
| 16 | (France) Agathe Calliet | 1039 | 12. 300 | 19. 170 | 17. 205 | 37. 20 | 14. 260 | 26. 84 |
| 17 | (Slovenia) Jennifer Eucharia Buckley | 1004 | 8. 415 | 16. 220 | - | 35. 25.5 | 28. 63 | 13. 280 |
| 18 | (United States) Lucile Saurel | 934 | 29. 48.66 | 8. 415 | 27. 68 | 21. 145 | 29.52 | 17. 205 |
| 19 | (Japan) Miho Nonaka | 815 | 22. 130 | 23. 120 | 18. 185 | 9. 380 | - | - |
| 20 | (United States) Brooke Raboutou | 813 | 16. 203 | 4. 610 | - | - | - | - |

== Keqiao, China (1-3 May) ==
=== Women ===
68 athletes attended the World Climbing Series in Keqiao. France's Zélia Avezou won her first World Climbing Series gold ahead of Slovenia's Janja Garnbret. Only two attempts separated the top two spots. This marked Garnbret's first silver medal in Boulder since 2023. Australia's Oceana Mackenzie placed third.

| Rank | Name | Score |
|---|---|---|
| 1 | (France) Zélia Avezou | 84.8 |
| 2 | (Slovenia) Janja Garnbret | 84.6 |
| 3 | (Australia) Oceana Mackenzie | 69.6 |
| 4 | (United States) Annie Sanders | 69.5 |
| 5 | (France) Oriane Bertone | 60.0 |
| 6 | (United Kingdom) Emma Edwards | 59.8 |
| 7 | (Japan) Melody Sekikawa | 59.7 |
| 8 | (Slovenia) Jennifer Eucharia Buckley | 44.7 |

=== Men ===
74 athletes attended the World Climbing Series in Keqiao. Japan's Sorato Anraku repeated his victory in Keqiao from the previous year. Anraku was the only athlete to claim three tops in the final. South Korea's Lee Dohyun earned silver by securing a crucial top on the fourth boulder to finish ahead of France's Mejdi Schalck on the podium.

| Rank | Name | Score |
|---|---|---|
| 1 | (Japan) Sorato Anraku | 84.4 |
| 2 | (South Korea) Lee Dohyun | 69.6 |
| 3 | (France) Mejdi Schalck | 59.8 |
| 4 | (Japan) Tomoa Narasaki | 59.5 |
| 5 | (China) Pan Yufei | 44.6 |
| 6 | (China) Bai Xuanpu | 34.7 |
| 7 | (Belgium) Hannes Van Duysen | 29.9 |
| 8 | (South Korea) Chon Jong-won | 19.7 |

== Bern, Switzerland (22-24 May) ==
=== Women ===
75 athletes attended the World Climbing Series in Bern. Australia's Oceana Mackenzie won her first World Climbing Series gold. She was the only athlete to top three of the four final boulders. Mackenzie's win marked the first Boulder gold for Australia. Great Britain's Erin McNeice won the silver medal - claiming the only top on boulder three in the final. USA's Annie Sanders finished in third place.

| Rank | Name | Score |
|---|---|---|
| 1 | (Australia) Oceana Mackenzie | 74.5 |
| 2 | (United Kingdom) Erin McNeice | 69.0 |
| 3 | (United States) Annie Sanders | 60.0 |
| 4 | (United States) Brooke Raboutou | 44.1 |
| 5 | (Japan) Melody Sekikawa | 29.7 |
| 6 | (Japan) Mao Nakamura | 25.0 |
| 7 | (France) Oriane Bertone | 19.8 |
| 8 | (France) Lucile Saurel | 19.3 |

=== Men ===
78 athletes attended the World Climbing Series in Bern. Last year's winner Pan Yufei did not advance past the qualification round. Sorato Anraku won his second Boulder gold of the season with a decisive top on boulder four to finish ahead of France's Mejdi Schalck. Belgium's Hannes Van Duysen completed the podium in third place.

| Rank | Name | Score |
|---|---|---|
| 1 | (Japan) Sorato Anraku | 99.7 |
| 2 | (France) Mejdi Schalck | 84.3 |
| 3 | (Belgium) Hannes Van Duysen | 69.2 |
| 4 | (Japan) Sohta Amagasa | 68.4 |
| 5 | (Israel) Adi Bark | 38.8 |
| 6 | (United Kingdom) Maximillian Milne | 29.6 |
| 7 | (France) Paul Jenft | 29.4 |
| 8 | (United States) Colin Duffy | 29.4 |

== Madrid, Spain (28-31 May) ==
=== Women ===
73 athletes attended the World Climbing Series in Madrid. Erin McNeice scored a second career gold in Boulder as the only athlete to top all four final boulders. Melody Sekikawa earned silver, topping three of the four final boulders. This marked Sekikawa's second career podium at the senior international level. Oriane Bertone claimed her first podium finish of the season with bronze.

| Rank | Name | Score |
|---|---|---|
| 1 | (United Kingdom) Erin McNeice | 99.1 |
| 2 | (Japan) Melody Sekikawa | 84.5 |
| 3 | (France) Oriane Bertone | 84.4 |
| 4 | (Japan) Anon Matsufuji | 69.6 |
| 5 | (Australia) Oceana Mackenzie | 69.2 |
| 6 | (Israel) Ayala Kerem | 59.5 |
| 7 | (Japan) Mao Nakamura | 29.9 |
| 8 | (Italy) Camilla Moroni | 19.8 |

=== Men ===
79 athletes attended the World Climbing Series in Madrid. Sorato Anraku claimed his third consecutive Boulder gold medal after nearly missing the cut for the finals. Anraku was the only athlete to top all four boulders in the final. Colin Duffy led the competition throughout the semifinal and final round but was unable to complete boulder four in the final round. Duffy earned his first podium of the season, marking a return to the Boulder podium since 2022. Samuel Richard completed the podium in third place, marking the French climber's second podium in just two final appearances at the senior international level.

| Rank | Name | Score |
|---|---|---|
| 1 | (Japan) Sorato Anraku | 99.3 |
| 2 | (United States) Colin Duffy | 74.7 |
| 3 | (France) Samuel Richard | 54.4 |
| 4 | (South Korea) Lee Dohyun | 44.6 |
| 5 | (Japan) Keita Dohi | 44.3 |
| 6 | (Spain) Guillermo Peinado Granganillo | 35.0 |
| 7 | (Canada) Oscar Baudrand | 29.5 |
| 8 | (United Kingdom) Dayan Akhtar | 19.6 |

== Prague, Czech Republic (3-7 June) ==
=== Women ===
83 athletes attended the World Climbing Series in Prague. Last year's winner Oriane Bertone did not advance past the semifinal. Annie Sanders won her third Boulder gold medal with three tops and a zone, winning the gold by virtue of having used fewer attempts to top. Erin McNeice followed her win in Madrid with a silver medal in Prague. Zhang Yuetong claimed her first podium in the boulder discipline with bronze.

| Rank | Name | Score |
|---|---|---|
| 1 | (United States) Annie Sanders | 84.3 |
| 2 | (United Kingdom) Erin McNeice | 84.1 |
| 3 | (China) Zhang Yuetong | 69.7 |
| 4 | (Japan) Melody Sekikawa | 69.5 |
| 5 | (Australia) Oceana Mackenzie | 59.5 |
| 6 | (Japan) Mao Nakamura | 54.6 |
| 7 | (France) Zélia Avezou | 44.7 |
| 8 | (Japan) Anon Matsufuji | 29.7 |

=== Men ===
101 athletes attended the World Climbing Series in Prague. The final round yielded only three tops. Two of the four final boulders remained unsolved. With one top and two zones, Sorato Anraku secured his fourth consecutive bouldering gold medal - setting an unprecedented record in men's bouldering. Less than four attempts separated the podium finishers in this hard final. Lee Dohyun and Mejdi Schalck placed second and third respectively.

| Rank | Name | Score |
|---|---|---|
| 1 | (Japan) Sorato Anraku | 55.0 |
| 2 | (South Korea) Lee Dohyun | 54.8 |
| 3 | (France) Mejdi Schalck | 54.7 |
| 4 | (France) Sam Avezou | 39.7 |
| 5 | (United Kingdom) Maximillian Milne | 29.9 |
| 6 | (France) Max Bertone | 29.6 |
| 7 | (Germany) Lucas Trandafir | 29.4 |
| 8 | (Austria) Jan-Luca Posch | 29.4 |

== Innsbruck, Austria (17-21 June) ==
=== Women ===
80 athletes attended the World Climbing Series in Innsbruck. Last year's winner Janja Garnbret did not compete. In a difficult final that only saw four tops across three athletes and half of the field being unable to top a boulder, Annie Sanders won in front of Erin McNeice as the only athlete to top two boulders. Sanders was the only athlete to top boulder 2 in the final. Oceana Mackenzie placed third, having flashed three zones. The women's final received heavy criticism from netizens for its difficulty, particularly for boulder 2 where majority of the finalists struggled to establish a start and score a zone.

| Rank | Name | Score |
|---|---|---|
| 1 | (United States) Annie Sanders | 68.9 |
| 2 | (United Kingdom) Erin McNeice | 34.8 |
| 3 | (Australia) Oceana Mackenzie | 30.0 |
| 4 | (China) Zhang Yuetong | 29.4 |
| 5 | (France) Oriane Bertone | 24.5 |
| 6 | (Israel) Ayala Kerem | 19.7 |
| 7 | (Italy) Camilla Moroni | 19.0 |
| 8 | (Japan) Futaba Ito | 9.8 |

=== Men ===
101 athletes attended the World Climbing Series in Innsbruck. Last year's winner Toby Roberts did not compete due to injury. Sorato Anraku won a historic fifth-consecutive gold medal in bouldering. He persisted in topping boulder 2 after 11 attempts, securing his victory over compatriot Rei Kawamata who claimed silver - marking Kawamata's first World Climbing Series podium finish in 4 years after his first in 2022. Lee Dohyun earned bronze, his third medal of the season.

| Rank | Name | Score |
|---|---|---|
| 1 | (Japan) Sorato Anraku | 74.0 |
| 2 | (Japan) Rei Kawamata | 59.3 |
| 3 | (South Korea) Lee Dohyun | 59.3 |
| 4 | (France) Sam Avezou | 49.9 |
| 5 | (South Korea) Chon Jong-won | 49.8 |
| 6 | (Belgium) Hannes Van Duysen | 44.6 |
| 7 | (Japan) Sohta Amagasa | 43.5 |
| 8 | (United Kingdom) Maximillian Milne | 34.4 |

== Salt Lake City, United States (16-18 October) ==
=== Women ===
55 athletes attended the World Climbing Series in Salt Lake City. Last year's winner Mao Nakamura finished third, behind Erin McNeice, separated by attempts to top. Oriane Bertone won her first World Climbing Series of the season, being the only climber to top the dynamic first boulder and end the final round with 3 tops.

| Rank | Name | Score |
|---|---|---|
| 1 | (France) Oriane Bertone | 84.6 |
| 2 | (United Kingdom) Erin McNeice | 69.7 |
| 3 | (Japan) Mao Nakamura | 69.6 |
| 4 | (Australia) Oceania Mackenzie | 54.8 |
| 5 | (Japan) Melody Sekikawa | 54.7 |
| 6 | (Israel) Ayala Kerem | 54.5 |
| 7 | (United States) Annie Sanders | 54.3 |
| 8 | (Japan) Anon Matsufuji | 39.9 |

=== Men ===
78 athletes attended the World Climbing Series in Salt Lake City. Last year's winner Sorato Anraku did not advance past the qualification round. Innsbruck silver medallist Rei Kawamata claimed bronze while Maximillian Milne placed second, marking a return to the international podium since 2024. Yonatan Katz, a first-time semifinalist and finalist at the world stage, won the competition. He achieved the only top of the final boulder. His victory also marked team Israel's first international gold medal since Alex Khazanov's bouldering World Cup win in 2018.

| Rank | Name | Score |
|---|---|---|
| 1 | (Israel) Yonatan Katz | 69.7 |
| 2 | (United Kingdom) Maximillian Milne | 59.7 |
| 3 | (Japan) Rei Kawamata | 54.2 |
| 4 | (Japan) Sohta Amagasa | 44.4 |
| 5 | (France) Max Bertone | 35.0 |
| 6 | (Israel) Or Mark | 34.8 |
| 7 | (United Kingdom) Dayan Akhtar | 34.5 |
| 8 | (Germany) Elias Arriagada Krüger | 19.2 |
