= 2022 Combined Japan Cup =

Annual competition climbing event

Combined Japan Cup 2022
- Venue: Ishizuchi Climbing Park SAIJO
- Location: Saijo, Ehime, Japan
- Date: 12 – 13 November 2022
- Website: https://www.jma-climbing.org/competition/2022/cjc/

Medalists
gold medal	Sorato Anraku / Ai Mori
silver medal	Sohta Amagasa / Ryu Nakagawa
bronze medal	Kento Yamaguchi / Miho Nonaka

The 2022 Combined Japan Cup was the 5th edition of the annual competition combined climbing event organised by the Japan Mountaineering and Sport Climbing Association (JMSCA), held in Ishizuchi Climbing Park SAIJO, Ehime.

CJC2022 served as a selection event for Japan's Paris Olympics training athlete group for Sport Climbing. CJC2022 was the last domestic combined competition of the 2022 season. 21 men and 22 women competed, with Sorato Anraku and Ai Mori winning the men's and women's titles respectively.

== Results ==
=== Finals ===
The men's combined finals took place on 13 November 2022.

Rank	Name	Boulder					Lead	Total		
Rank	Name	1	2	3	4	Σ	Lead	Total		
Rank	Name	1st place, gold medalist(s)	Sorato Anraku	24.9	9.3	24.8	4.7	63.7	80.1	143.8
2nd place, silver medalist(s)	Sohta Amagasa	24.8	9.8	9.9	4.9	49.4	42.1	91.5		
3rd place, bronze medalist(s)	Kento Yamaguchi	24.8	9.4	0.0	4.9	39.1	51.1	90.2		
4	Rei Kawamata	25.0	9.9	24.4	0.0	59.3	26.1	85.4		
5	Yuji Fujiwaki	9.3	9.8	8.9	4.6	32.6	51.1	83.7		
6	Meichi Narasaki	9.9	9.8	24.8	5.0	49.5	30.1	79.6		
7	Keita Dohi	24.7	24.8	10.0	10.0	69.5	8.1	77.6		
8	Ao Yurikusa	9.7	10.0	0.0	0.0	19.7	14.0	33.7		

The women's combined finals took place on 13 November 2022.

Rank	Name	Boulder					Lead	Total		
Rank	Name	1	2	3	4	Σ	Lead	Total		
Rank	Name	1st place, gold medalist(s)	Ai Mori	24.9	24.9	9.9	10.0	69.7	96.1	165.8
2nd place, silver medalist(s)	Ryu Nakagawa	24.7	25.0	9.7	5.0	64.4	48.1	112.5		
3rd place, bronze medalist(s)	Miho Nonaka	24.9	9.8	10.0	4.9	49.6	48.1	97.7		
4	Nanako Kura	9.7	5.0	9.8	0.0	24.5	36.1	60.6		
5	Ai Takeuchi	4.6	5.0	4.9	0.0	14.5	39.0	53.5		
6	Nonoha Kume	9.9	5.0	5.0	9.8	29.7	7.0	36.7		
7	Mashiro Kuzuu	9.5	10.0	4.9	0.0	24.4	7.0	31.4		
8	Natsuki Tanii	9.8	5.0	4.8	0.0	19.6	6.1	25.7		

=== Qualifications ===
The men's combined qualifications took place on 12 November 2022.

Rank	Name	Boulder					Lead	Total	Notes			
Rank	Name	1	2	3	4	Σ	Lead	Total	Notes			
Rank	Name	1	Sorato Anraku	24.7	24.8	24.8	24.5	98.8	Notes	84.1	182.9	Q
2	Yuji Fujiwaki	24.1	10.0	25.0	24.8	83.9	80.1	164.0	Q			
3	Ao Yurikusa	10.0	9.5	24.7	9.8	54.0	88.0	142.0	Q			
4	Rei Kawamata	10.0	9.5	9.7	24.3	53.5	88.0	141.5	Q			
5	Sohta Amagasa	24.8	9.5	24.8	9.9	69.0	72.1	141.1	Q			
6	Keita Dohi	24.8	4.6	24.8	24.6	78.8	60.1	138.9	Q			
7	Kento Yamaguchi	24.8	9.9	10.0	9.7	54.4	84.1	138.5	Q			
8	Meichi Narasaki	25.0	4.9	24.6	4.4	58.9	76.1	135.0	Q			
9	Mahiro Takami	24.9	24.9	25.0	9.4	84.2	45.0	129.2				
10	Hiroto Shimizu	9.4	24.7	4.9	9.9	48.9	80.1	129.0				
11	Ritsu Kayotani	9.1	9.9	24.9	9.9	53.9	72.0	125.9				
12	Reo Matsuoka	25.0	10.0	9.8	5.0	49.8	76.0	125.8				
13	Rei Sugimoto	25.0	25.0	5.0	9.6	64.6	54.1	118.7				
14	Tomoaki Takata	24.8	10.0	24.9	4.8	64.5	54.1	118.6				
15	Masahiro Higuchi	9.6	10.0	5.0	9.6	34.2	84.1	118.3				
16	Yuya Kitae	9.7	9.9	5.0	5.0	29.6	80.1	109.7				
17	Katsura Konishi	24.9	9.7	5.0	4.7	49.3	57.0	106.3				
18	Toru Kofukuda	24.9	10.0	4.9	24.6	43.7	54.1	97.8				
19	Taito Nakagami	9.7	0.0	5.0	5.0	19.7	76.0	95.7				
20	Hannes Puman	4.8	0.0	5.0	5.0	14.8	54.1	68.9				
21	Lin Chia Hsiang	4.6	0.0	5.0	9.5	19.1	26.1	45.2				

The women's combined qualifications took place on 12 November 2022.

Rank	Name	Boulder					Lead	Total	Notes			
Rank	Name	1	2	3	4	Σ	Lead	Total	Notes			
Rank	Name	1	Ai Mori	23.7	0.0	5.0	25.0	53.7	Notes	96.1	149.8	Q
2	Natsuki Tanii	9.4	0.0	4.9	24.6	38.9	88.1	127.0	Q			
3	Miho Nonaka	25.0	9.8	5.0	9.9	49.7	76.1	125.8	Q			
4	Mashiro Kuzuu	24.6	0.0	5.0	24.9	54.5	68.1	122.6	Q			
5	Nonoha Kume	25.0	0.0	10.0	24.8	54.8	60.0	114.8	Q			
6	Ryu Nakagawa	9.8	5.0	0.0	9.8	24.6	80.0	104.6	Q			
7	Nanako Kura	24.8	4.4	4.8	10.0	44.0	60.0	104.0	Q			
8	Ai Takeuchi	24.7	4.6	4.7	9.7	43.7	60.1	103.8	Q			
9	Mao Nakamura	24.9	0.0	5.0	25.0	54.9	42.1	97.0				
10	Yuno Harigae	24.9	0.0	4.9	9.8	39.6	54.0	93.6				
11	Zhang Yuetong	4.8	0.0	4.9	0.0	9.7	80.0	89.7				
12	Miku Ishii	9.7	4.7	4.2	9.9	28.5	54.0	82.5				
13	Ichika Osawa	0.0	0.0	5.0	24.9	29.9	42.0	71.9				
14	Yuki Hiroshige	0.0	0.0	0.0	9.7	9.7	57.1	66.8				
15	Souka Hasegawa	9.1	0.0	5.0	9.6	23.7	42.0	65.7				
16	Serika Okawachi	9.3	9.9	5.0	0.0	24.2	39.0	63.2				
17	Lee Hung Ying	9.9	0.0	4.7	9.6	24.2	36.0	60.2				
18	Hatsune Takeishi	25.0	4.9	4.9	0.0	34.9	20.0	54.9				
19	Kiki Matsuda	9.8	4.6	4.9	4.6	23.9	30.1	54.0				
20	Mia Aoyagi	25.0	4.7	4.8	9.9	44.4	1.0	45.4				
21	Risa Ota	9.7	0.0	0.0	9.8	19.5	20.1	39.6				
22	Mishika Ishii	4.4	0.0	0.0	0.0	4.4	24.1	28.5				
