= Boulder Japan Cup 2023 =

Annual competition climbing event

- Venue: Komazawa Olympic Park
- Location: Tokyo, Japan
- Date: 4 – 5 February 2023
- Website: https://www.jma-climbing.org/competition/2023/bjc/

Medalists
gold medal	Meichi Narasaki / Futaba Ito
silver medal	Daiki Sano / Miho Nonaka
bronze medal	Tomoa Narasaki / Melody Sekikawa

The 2023 Boulder Japan Cup (Japanese: ボルダージャパンカップ2023, Hepburn: Borudā Japan Kappu 2023; or BJC 2023) was the 18th edition of the annual competition bouldering event organised by the Japan Mountaineering and Sport Climbing Association (JMSCA), held in Komazawa Olympic Park, Tokyo.

BJC is the sole selection event for Japan's national bouldering team. Athletes who place highly at the BJC are eligible to compete in the Boulder World Cups, subject to JMSCA's prevailing selection criteria. BJC 2023 was the first domestic competition of the 2023 season. 58 men and 53 women competed, with Meichi Narasaki and Futaba Ito winning the men's and women's titles respectively.

== Finals ==
=== Men ===
The men's bouldering finals took place on 5 February 2023.

Rank	Athlete	Boulder				Total
Rank	Athlete	1	2	3	4	Total
1	Meichi Narasaki	T4 z3	T3 z1	T3 z3	z2	3T 4z 10 9
2	Daiki Sano	-	T3 z3	T2 z2	-	2T 2z 5 5
3	Tomoa Narasaki	T5 z5	z2	z1	-	1T 3z 5 8
4	Ritsu Kayotani	-	z9	T9 z9	-	1T 2z 9 18
5	Yuji Fujiwaki	-	z2	-	-	0T 1z 0 2
6	Kokoro Fujii	-	-	-	-	0T 0z 0 0

=== Women ===
The women's bouldering finals took place on 5 February 2023.

Rank	Athlete	Boulder				Total
Rank	Athlete	1	2	3	4	Total
1	Futaba Ito	T1 z1	T1 z1	T1 z1	T1 z1	4T 4z 4 4
2	Miho Nonaka	T3 z1	z5	T1 z1	T1 z1	3T 4z 5 8
3	Melody Sekikawa	T9 z7	T5 z1	z4	z2	2T 4z 14 14
4	Ai Mori	-	T2 z1	-	T1 z1	2T 2z 3 2
5	Mia Aoyagi	T3 z1	z3	z2	z7	1T 4z 3 13
6	Anon Matsufuji	z5	z2	z1	z6	0T 4z 0 14

== Semifinals ==
=== Men ===
The men's bouldering semifinals took place on 5 February 2023.

Rank	Athlete	Boulder				Total	Notes
Rank	Athlete	1	2	3	4	Total	Notes
1	Tomoa Narasaki	T1 z1	T4 z4	T3 z3	z2	3T 4z 8 10	Q
2	Kokoro Fujii	T4 z1	T4 z3	T6 z6	z1	3T 4z 14 11	Q
3	Daiki Sano	T4 z3	T2 z2	T7 z7	-	3T 3z 13 12	Q
4	Ritsu Kayotani	z1	T3 z3	T4 z4	z1	2T 4z 7 9	Q
5	Yuji Fujiwaki	z2	T2 z2	z4	-	1T 3z 2 8	Q
6	Meichi Narasaki	T1 z1	-	-	z1	1T 2z 1 2	Q
7	Sorato Anraku	-	-	T8 z8	z4	1T 2z 8 12	
8	Rei Sugimoto	z2	z4	-	z4	0T 3z 0 10	
9	Tomoaki Takata	z1	-	z10	z1	0T 3z 0 12	
10	Junta Sekiguchi	z2	z5	-	z5	0T 3z 0 12	
11	Katsura Konishi	z1	-	-	z1	0T 2z 0 2	
12	Yusuke Sugimoto	z2	-	-	z1	0T 2z 0 3	
13	Kento Yamaguchi	z2	-	-	z1	0T 2z 0 3	
14	Rei Kawamata	z2	z4	-	-	0T 2z 0 6	
15	Masahiro Higuchi	z2	-	-	z4	0T 2z 0 6	
16	Yoshiyuki Ogata	-	-	-	z1	0T 1z 0 1	
17	Hiroto Shimizu	z1	-	-	-	0T 1z 0 1	
18	Ryohei Kameyama	-	-	-	z2	0T 1z 0 2	
19	Mahiro Takami	-	-	-	-	0T 0z 0 0	
20	Ao Yurikusa	-	-	-	-	0T 0z 0 0	

=== Women ===
The women's bouldering semifinals took place on 5 February 2023.

Rank	Athlete	Boulder				Total	Notes
Rank	Athlete	1	2	3	4	Total	Notes
1	Miho Nonaka	T1 z1	T1 z1	z1	T1 z1	3T 4z 3 4	Q
2	Anon Matsufuji	T1 z1	T5 z5	z1	T3 z2	3T 4z 9 9	Q
3	Mia Aoyagi	T6 z5	T2 z2	z1	T1 z1	3T 4z 9 9	Q
4	Futaba Ito	T2 z2	-	T2 z1	T1 z1	3T 3z 5 4	Q
5	Ai Mori	T2 z2	-	T1 z1	T2 z2	3T 3z 5 5	Q
6	Melody Sekikawa	T2 z2	z5	z1	T2 z1	2T 4z 4 9	Q
7	Ryu Nakagawa	T2 z2	z7	z3	T2 z2	2T 4z 4 14	
8	Nanako Kura	T1 z1	-	z2	T2 z1	2T 3z 3 4	
9	Nonoha Kume	T1 z1	-	z1	T3 z2	2T 3z 4 4	
10	Serika Okawachi	z5	T3 z3	-	T1 z1	2T 3z 4 9	
11	Mashiro Kuzuu	T2 z2	-	-	T4 z3	2T 2z 6 5	
12	Ai Takeuchi	T5 z4	z4	z3	z1	1T 4z 5 12	
13	Mei Kotake	z3	-	z1	T3 z2	1T 3z 3 6	
14	Natsuki Tanii	z9	-	z2	T3 z1	1T 3z 3 12	
15	Hana Koike	z3	T6 z6	z1	-	1T 3z 6 10	
16	Michika Nagashima	z5	-	z1	T6 z5	1T 3z 6 11	
17	Ryo Nakajima	z2	-	-	T1 z1	1T 2z 1 3	
18	Miku Ishii	z7	-	-	T1 z1	1T 2z 1 8	
19	Moe Takiguchi	z9	-	z1	-	0T 2z 0 10	
20	Kiki Matsuda	-	-	-	z2	0T 1z 0 2	

== Qualifications ==
=== Men ===
The men's bouldering qualifications took place on 4 February 2023.

Rank	Athlete	Boulder					Total	Notes
Rank	Athlete	1	2	3	4	5	Total	Notes
1	Sorato Anraku	T2 z2	z1	T4 z4	T6 z6	T7 z7	4T 5z 19 20	Q
2	Rei Sugimoto	T1 z1	T1 z1	z3	T2 z2	z2	3T 5z 4 9	Q
3	Yuji Fujiwaki	T3 z3	z1	T3 z3	z1	T2 z1	3T 5z 8 9	Q
4	Tomoa Narasaki	T1 z1	T1 z1	T3 z2	-	z1	3T 4z 5 5	Q
5	Rei Kawamata	T1 z1	T1 z1	-	T3 z3	z3	3T 4z 5 8	Q
6	Yusuke Sugimoto	T3 z1	T2 z1	T3 z3	-	z3	3T 4z 8 8	Q
7	Ryohei Kameyama	T3 z1	T2 z2	T4 z3	-	z1	3T 4z 9 7	Q
8	Masahiro Higuchi	T1 z1	z3	-	T6 z6	T4 z2	3T 4z 11 12	Q
9	Yoshiyuki Ogata	T4 z2	T1 z1	-	-	T1 z1	3T 3z 6 4	Q
10	Kokoro Fujii	T1 z1	T3 z2	z2	z2	z1	2T 5z 4 8	Q
11	Hiroto Shimizu	T1 z1	T1 z1	z2	-	z3	2T 4z 2 7	Q
12	Meichi Narasaki	T1 z1	z1	T2 z2	-	z2	2T 4z 3 6	Q
13	Daiki Sano	T2 z2	-	T1 z1	z2	z4	2T 4z 3 9	Q
14	Katsura Konishi	z2	z1	T1 z1	-	T3 z3	2T 4z 4 7	Q
15	Tomoaki Takata	T2 z2	T2 z2	z4	-	z2	2T 4z 4 10	Q
16	Kento Yamaguchi	T4 z4	T1 z1	z6	-	z1	2T 4z 5 12	Q
17	Ritsu Kayotani	T1 z1	z1	z5	-	T5 z5	2T 4z 6 12	Q
18	Mahiro Takami	T9 z4	-	T5 z5	z4	z3	2T 4z 14 16	Q
19	Junta Sekiguchi	T1 z1	T1 z1	-	-	z5	2T 3z 2 7	Q
20	Ao Yurikusa	T2 z2	T2 z1	-	-	z3	2T 3z 3 6	Q
21	Taisei Homma	T2 z1	T2 z2	-	-	z1	2T 3z 4 4	
22	Reo Matsuoka	T4 z4	T3 z2	-	-	z3	2T 3z 7 9	
23	Sohta Amagasa	T1 z1	z1	z3	z2	z1	1T 5z 1 8	
24	Yuya Kitae	T1 z1	z1	-	z4	z2	1T 4z 1 8	
25	Hayato Nakamura	T2 z2	z1	z7	-	z1	1T 4z 2 11	
26	Keita Watabe	z1	z2	T3 z3	-	z1	1T 4z 3 7	
27	Satone Yoshida	T3 z3	z1	-	-	z2	1T 3z 3 6	
28	Keita Dohi	z1	T4 z3	-	-	z1	1T 3z 4 5	
29	Ryo Omasa	T5 z1	z1	-	-	z1	1T 3z 5 3	
30	Taisei Ishimatsu	T9 z1	z1	-	-	z2	1T 3z 9 4	
30	Shion Omata	T9 z1	z2	-	-	z1	1T 3z 9 4	
32	Jun Yasukawa	z1	T1 z1	-	-	-	1T 2z 1 2	
33	Hayato Tsuru	T1 z1	z2	-	-	-	1T 2z 1 3	
34	Shuto Matsusawa	T1 z1	-	-	-	z3	1T 2z 1 4	
35	Taito Nakagami	T2 z2	z2	-	-	-	1T 2z 2 4	
36	Manato Kurashiki	z2	T4 z3	-	-	-	1T 2z 4 5	
37	Kotaro Hirasawa	T5 z4	z1	-	-	-	1T 2z 5 5	
37	Shuhei Yukimaru	T5 z4	z1	-	-	-	1T 2z 5 5	
39	Masaya Ogata	T6 z6	-	z5	-	-	1T 2z 6 11	
40	Haruyoshi Morimoto	T2 z1	-	-	-	-	1T 1z 2 1	
41	Masaki Saito	T5 z5	-	-	-	-	1T 1z 5 5	
42	Kaho Murakoshi	z1	z1	-	-	-	0T 2z 0 2	
43	Mizuki Tajima	z2	z1	-	-	-	0T 2z 0 3	
44	Toru Kofukuda	z3	z1	-	-	-	0T 2z 0 4	
44	Taiga Sakamoto	z3	z1	-	-	-	0T 2z 0 4	
44	Eito Tamiya	z2	z2	-	-	-	0T 2z 0 4	
44	Naoki Tsurumoto	z2	z2	-	-	-	0T 2z 0 4	
48	Daiju Bansho	z3	-	-	-	z3	0T 2z 0 6	
49	Ryoga Tsukada	z5	z2	-	-	-	0T 2z 0 7	
50	Akihisa Kaji	z3	-	z8	-	-	0T 2z 0 11	
51	Ryoei Nukui	z9	z4	-	-	-	0T 2z 0 13	
52	Shuta Tanaka	z1	-	-	-	-	0T 1z 0 1	
53	Raito Kato	z2	-	-	-	-	0T 1z 0 2	
53	Rikuto Nobuchika	z2	-	-	-	-	0T 1z 0 2	
55	Ichito Sugawara	z3	-	-	-	-	0T 1z 0 3	
56	Soma Ito	z5	-	-	-	-	0T 1z 0 5	
57	Yo Masuda	z8	-	-	-	-	0T 1z 0 8	
58	Kai Harada	-	-	-	-	-	0T 0z 0 0	

=== Women ===
The women's bouldering qualifications took place on 4 February 2023.

Rank	Athlete	Boulder					Total	Notes
Rank	Athlete	1	2	3	4	5	Total	Notes
1	Futaba Ito	T1 z1	T1 z1	T1 z1	T1 z1	T1 z1	5T 5z 5 5	Q
1	Ryu Nakagawa	T1 z1	T1 z1	T1 z1	T1 z1	T1 z1	5T 5z 5 5	Q
3	Miho Nonaka	T1 z1	T2 z2	T1 z1	T1 z1	T1 z1	5T 5z 6 6	Q
3	Nonoha Kume	T1 z1	T1 z1	T2 z2	T1 z1	T1 z1	5T 5z 6 6	Q
5	Anon Matsufuji	T1 z1	T1 z1	T2 z2	T1 z1	T2 z1	5T 5z 7 6	Q
6	Melody Sekikawa	T1 z1	T1 z1	T1 z1	T3 z1	T2 z1	5T 5z 8 5	Q
7	Mashiro Kuzuu	T2 z2	T1 z1	T3 z1	T1 z1	T1 z1	5T 5z 8 6	Q
8	Serika Okawachi	T2 z2	T1 z1	T4 z4	T2 z1	T1 z1	5T 5z 10 9	Q
9	Natsuki Tanii	T1 z1	T1 z1	z1	T1 z1	T2 z1	4T 5z 5 5	Q
10	Hana Koike	T1 z1	T1 z1	z2	T2 z1	T1 z1	4T 5z 5 6	Q
10	Ai Mori	T1 z1	T1 z1	z2	T2 z1	T1 z1	4T 5z 5 6	Q
12	Ryo Nakajima	T1 z1	T1 z1	z1	T2 z1	T2 z1	4T 5z 6 5	Q
13	Mia Aoyagi	T1 z1	T1 z1	T3 z3	z1	T1 z1	4T 5z 6 7	Q
14	Ai Takeuchi	T1 z1	T1 z1	z1	T4 z1	T1 z1	4T 5z 7 5	Q
15	Mei Kotake	T2 z2	T1 z1	z1	T2 z1	T4 z1	4T 5z 9 6	Q
16	Moe Takiguchi	T1 z1	T4 z2	z1	T1 z1	T3 z2	4T 5z 9 7	Q
17	Miku Ishii	T1 z1	T1 z1	z1	z1	T1 z1	3T 5z 3 5	Q
18	Nanako Kura	T1 z1	T1 z1	z2	z1	T2 z1	3T 5z 4 6	Q
19	Michika Nagashima	T2 z1	T1 z1	z2	z1	T2 z1	3T 5z 5 6	Q
20	Kiki Matsuda	T1 z1	T2 z1	T2 z2	z4	z1	3T 5z 5 10	Q
21	Sana Ogura	T1 z1	T2 z1	z4	z1	T3 z1	3T 5z 6 8	
22	Natsumi Hirano	T1 z1	z4	z2	T3 z1	T2 z1	3T 5z 6 9	
23	Ichika Osawa	T1 z1	T3 z3	z1	z2	T3 z1	3T 5z 7 8	
24	Mao Nakamura	T1 z1	T4 z2	z2	z1	T3 z1	3T 5z 8 7	
25	Momoka Kaneko	T1 z1	T1 z1	-	z2	T1 z1	3T 4z 3 5	
26	Yuno Harigae	T1 z1	T1 z1	-	z1	T2 z1	3T 4z 4 4	
27	Sora Ito	T1 z1	z3	-	T2 z1	T2 z1	3T 4z 5 6	
28	Risa Ota	T2 z2	T3 z3	-	z1	T3 z1	3T 4z 8 7	
29	Kaho Murakoshi	T1 z1	T1 z1	z8	z3	z1	2T 5z 2 14	
30	Sora Kudo	T2 z1	T3 z2	z2	z1	z1	2T 5z 5 7	
31	Hatsune Takeishi	T3 z2	T6 z6	z2	z1	z1	2T 5z 9 12	
32	Manami Yama	T1 z1	T1 z1	-	z1	z1	2T 4z 2 4	
33	Homare Toda	T1 z1	T2 z2	-	z1	z1	2T 4z 3 5	
34	Yuno Shinozaki	T3 z3	T1 z1	-	z1	z1	2T 4z 4 6	
35	Miu Kurita	z4	T1 z1	-	T3 z1	z1	2T 4z 4 7	
36	Yuka Higuchi	T4 z4	T1 z1	-	z5	z1	2T 4z 5 11	
37	Honoka Oda	z8	T7 z7	-	z1	T4 z1	2T 4z 11 17	
38	Souka Hasegawa	T2 z1	T1 z1	-	z1	-	2T 3z 3 3	
39	Aya Sugawara	T2 z2	T2 z2	-	z1	-	2T 3z 4 5	
40	Hana Kudo	T2 z2	T3 z3	-	z2	-	2T 3z 5 7	
41	Tsukushi Yamauchi	z4	T1 z1	-	z1	z1	1T 4z 1 7	
42	Yui Suezawa	z3	T2 z2	-	z1	z1	1T 4z 2 7	
43	Katsuki Bamba	z5	z4	-	T2 z1	z1	1T 4z 2 11	
44	Yuka Nagano	z8	T4 z3	-	z1	z1	1T 4z 4 13	
45	Honoka Oda	z3	T6 z6	-	z1	z1	1T 4z 6 11	
46	Tomona Takao	-	T1 z1	-	z4	z1	1T 3z 1 6	
47	Hina Sato	z2	T2 z1	-	z1	-	1T 3z 2 4	
48	Nana Goto	T9 z9	z2	-	z1	-	1T 3z 9 12	
49	Kanna Fujimura	-	T3 z1	-	z3	-	1T 2z 3 4	
50	Hanao Inoue	z2	z1	-	z1	z1	0T 4z 0 5	
51	Akane Kinoshita	z9	z1	-	z1	z1	0T 4z 0 13	
52	Runa Iuchi	z8	z9	-	z1	z1	0T 4z 0 19	
53	Yuna Suzuki	z3	z3	-	z3	-	0T 3z 0 9	
