= 2018 IFSC Climbing World Youth Championships =

Competition climbing event

2018 IFSC Climbing World Championships
- Location: (Russia) Moscow
- Date: 9-16 August 2018

The 2018 IFSC Climbing World Youth Championships (28th), was held in Moscow, Russia from 9 to 16 August 2018. The competition climbing championships consisted of lead, speed, and bouldering events, for the under 20, under 18, and under 16 age categories.

== Medal table ==
* Host nation (Russia)

Rank	Nation	Gold	Silver	Bronze	Total
1	Japan	6	1	7	14
2	Russia*	2	2	3	7
3	United States	2	2	2	6
4	Italy	2	2	0	4
5	South Korea	2	0	0	2
6	Slovenia	1	3	1	5
7	France	1	2	1	4
8	Poland	1	0	1	2
9	Great Britain	1	0	0	1
10	Austria	0	2	1	3
11	Czech Republic	0	1	0	1
11	Germany	0	1	0	1
11	Spain	0	1	0	1
11	Ukraine	0	1	0	1
15	China	0	0	1	1
15	Luxembourg	0	0	1	1
Totals (16 entries)		18	18	18	54

== Medalists ==
=== Male ===
Event	Gold	Silver	Bronze
Junior (Under 20)
Lead	Meichi Narasaki; Japan	Jakub Konecny; Czech Republic	Kai Harada; Japan
Bouldering	Meichi Narasaki; Japan	Yannick Flohé; Germany	Kai Harada; Japan
Speed	Gian Luca Zodda; Italy	Noah Bratschi; United States	Demyan Zaytsev; Russia
Youth A (Under 18)
Lead	Hidemasa Nishida; Japan	Luka Potočar; Slovenia	Katsura Konishi; Japan
Bouldering	Sam Avezou; France	Eneko Carretero Cruz; Spain	Nathan Martin; Luxembourg
Speed	Almaz Nagaev; Russia	Jordan Fishman; United States	Eduard Daukaev; Russia
Youth B (Under 16)
Lead	Colin Duffy; United States	Thomas Podolan; Austria	Kentaro Maeda; Japan
Bouldering	Rei Kawamata; Japan	Thomas Podolan; Austria	Ryoei Nukui; Japan
Speed	Jeon Haram; South Korea	Andrea Zappini; Italy	Ellis Ernsberger; United States

=== Female ===
Event	Gold	Silver	Bronze
Junior (Under 20)
Lead	Vita Lukan; Slovenia	Nolwenn Arc; France	Nina Arthaud; France
Bouldering	Hannah Slaney; Great Britain	Urska Repusic; Slovenia	Vita Lukan; Slovenia
Speed	Ekaterina Barashchuk; Russia	Elizaveta Ivanova; Russia	Elena Remizova; Russia
Youth A (Under 18)
Lead	Brooke Raboutou; United States	Futaba Ito; Japan	Sandra Lettner; Austria
Bouldering	Laura Rogora; Italy	Lučka Rakovec; Slovenia	Futaba Ito; Japan
Speed	Natalia Kałucka; Poland	Kamilla Kushaeva; Russia	Aleksandra Kałucka; Poland
Youth B (Under 16)
Lead	Natsuki Tanii; Japan	Nika Potapova; Ukraine	Zhang Yuetong; China
Bouldering	Natsuki Tanii; Japan	Naïlé Meignan; France	Hana Kudo; Japan
Speed	Jeong Ji-min; South Korea	Anna Calanca; Italy	Emma Hunt; United States
