= 2021 IFSC Climbing World Youth Championships =

Competition climbing event

2021 IFSC Climbing World Championships
- Location: (Russia) Voronezh
- Date: 21–31 August 2021

The 2021 IFSC Climbing World Youth Championships (30th), was held in Voronezh, Russia from 21 to 31 August 2021. The competition climbing championships consisted of lead, speed, and bouldering events, for the under 20, under 18, and under 16 age categories.

== Medal table ==
* Host nation (Russia)

Rank	Nation	Gold	Silver	Bronze	Total
1	Japan	3	2	3	8
2	Russia*	3	1	0	4
3	France	2	4	3	9
4	United States	2	2	3	7
5	Great Britain	2	1	0	3
6	Italy	1	3	2	6
7	Slovenia	1	2	3	6
8	Germany	1	2	2	5
9	Belgium	1	0	0	1
9	Bulgaria	1	0	0	1
9	Poland	1	0	0	1
12	Ukraine	0	1	0	1
13	Austria	0	0	2	2
14	Czech Republic	0	0	0	0
14	Kazakhstan	0	0	0	0
14	South Korea	0	0	0	0
Totals (16 entries)		18	18	18	54

== Medalists ==
=== Male ===
Event	Gold	Silver	Bronze
Junior (Under 20)
Lead	Hamish McArthur; Great Britain	Paul Jenft; France	Rei Kawamata; Japan
Bouldering	Hamish McArthur; Great Britain	Rei Kawamata; Japan	Paul Jenft; France
Speed	Iaroslav Pashkov; Russia	Danil Ukolov; Russia	Lawrence Bogeschdorfer; Austria
Youth A (Under 18)
Lead	Haruki Uemura; Japan	Mejdi Schalck; France	Timotej Romsak; Slovenia
Bouldering	Hannes Van Duysen; Belgium	Emil Zimmermann; Germany	Thorben Perry Bloem; Germany
Speed	Maksim Ryzhov; Russia	Hryhorii Ilchyshyn; Ukraine	Marco Rontini; Italy
Youth B (Under 16)
Lead	Sorato Anraku; Japan	Hugo Hoyer; United States	Dillon Countryman; United States
Bouldering	Nikolay Rusev; Bulgaria	Sorato Anraku; Japan	Auggie Chi; United States
Speed	Kirill Koldomov; Russia	Samuel Watson; United States	Yusuke Sugimoto; Japan

=== Female ===
Event	Gold	Silver	Bronze
Junior (Under 20)
Lead	Nonoha Kume; Japan	Lucija Tarkus; Slovenia	Camille Pouget; France
Bouldering	Naïlé Meignan; France	Emily Phillips; Great Britain	Lucija Tarkus; Slovenia
Speed	Franziska Ritter; Germany	Giulia Randi; Italy	Capucine Viglione; France
Youth A (Under 18)
Lead	Sara Copar; Slovenia	Alessia Mabboni; Italy	Liza Novak; Slovenia
Bouldering	Zélia Avezou; France	Sara Copar; Slovenia	Alessia Mabboni; Italy
Speed	Beatrice Colli; Italy	Nuria Brockfeld; Germany	Callie Close; United States
Youth B (Under 16)
Lead	Anastasia Sanders; United States	Meije Lerondel; France	Mio Nukui; Japan
Bouldering	Anastasia Sanders; United States	Meije Lerondel; France	Sina Willy; Austria
Speed	Daria Marciniak; Poland	Francesca Matuella; Italy	Julie Fritsche; Germany
