= Putra Tri Ramadani =

Indonesian climber

Personal information
- Nationality: Indonesian
- Born: 26 October 2005 (age 21) Kediri, East Java, Indonesia

Climbing career
- Type of climber: Competition lead climbing
Medal record
Event / 1st / 2nd / 3rd; World Cup / 1 / 1 / 2
Men's competition climbing
Representing Indonesia
World Cup
Second place	2026	Lead
World Cup (Event)
Gold medal – first place	Prague 2026	Lead
Silver medal – second place	Santiago 2026	Lead
Bronze medal – third place	Chamonix 2026	Lead
Bronze medal – third place	Koper 2026	Lead
Asian Youth Championships
Gold medal – first place	Jamshedpur 2024	Lead
Bronze medal – third place	Jamshedpur 2024	Boulder

Putra Tri Ramadani (born 26 October 2005) is an Indonesian competition climber, specializing in competition lead climbing.

== Career ==
Putra began competing on the IFSC Climbing World Cup circuit in 2022. In 2024, he won a gold medal in the junior lead category and a bronze medal in the boulder category at the Asian Youth Championships.

In 2025, Putra reached his first World Cup final and finished sixth in the lead event in Koper, Slovenia. The following year, he claimed his first World Series (formerly World Cup) title in the lead climbing event at the Prague leg of the series. The victory marked Indonesia's first World Climbing Series gold medal outside the of competition speed climbing discipline.

== Rankings ==
=== World Cup ===
Discipline	2022	2025	2026
Lead	81	16	2

=== World Championships ===
Discipline	Bern 2023	Seoul 2025
Boulder	75	-
Lead	53	9
Boulder & Lead	60	-
