= Rei Kawamata =

Japanese competition climber

Personal information
- Nationality: Japanese
- Born: August 3, 2003 (age 23) Tochigi, Japan
- Height: 170 cm (5 ft 7 in)

Climbing career
- Type of climber: Competition bouldering
Medal record
Men's competition climbing
Representing Japan
World Cup
Silver medal – second place	Innsbruck 2026	Bouldering
Bronze medal – third place	Salt Lake City 2022	Bouldering
Bronze medal – third place	Salt Lake City 2026	Bouldering
Asian Championships
Bronze medal – third place	Bogor 2019	Bouldering

Rei Kawamata (川又 玲瑛 Kawamata Rei; born August 3, 2003) is a Japanese competition climber who specializes in competition bouldering.

== Youth competitions ==
At age 14, Kawamata won gold in bouldering and silver in the combined event at the 2017 IFSC Climbing World Youth Championships in the Youth B (Male) category. He also won the 2018 Japan Youth National Championships and another bouldering gold medal at the 2018 World Youth Championships in the Youth B category. At the 2018 IFSC Climbing Asian Youth Championships, Kawamata won gold in bouldering and silver in lead. In 2019, Kawamata won the boulder and lead titles at the IFSC Climbing Asian Youth Championships in Bengaluru. He continued to have success in the youth competition climbing scene, earning the boulder silver and lead bronze medals in the Junior category at the 2021 IFSC Climbing World Youth Championships in Voronezh.

== Competition climbing ==
Kawamata began competing in senior competitions at age 15, entering the Meiringen, Moscow and Vail World Cups in 2019, notably placing 5th in the Moscow bouldering World Cup final in his debut season. He collected the bronze medal in the men's bouldering event at the 2019 IFSC Climbing Asian Championships.

In 2022, Kawamata secured his first World Cup podium with a bronze medal at the Salt Lake City World Cup.

In 2026, Kawamata secured his second career World Climbing Series podium in Innsbruck, claiming the silver medal behind compatriot Sorato Anraku. In October 2026, he placed third at the final World Climbing Series of the season in Salt Lake City.

== Rankings ==
=== IFSC Climbing World Cup ===
Discipline	2019	2022	2026
Bouldering	22	10	4

=== Japan Cup ===
Discipline	2017	2018	2019	2020	2021	2022	2023	2024	2025	2026
Bouldering	71	29	7	4	13	6	14	14	9	5

== Climbing World Championships ==
Youth

Discipline	2017 Youth B	2018 Youth B	2019 Youth A	2021 Juniors
Lead	5	12	12	3
Bouldering	1	1	5	2
Speed	29	19	-	-
Combined	2	-	-	-
