= 2026 World Climbing Series =

Sport season in competition climbing

- Organiser: World Climbing
- Edition: 38th
- Events: 19: 6 Boulder 6 Lead 7 Speed
- Locations: 13: Keqiao (B) Wujiang (L, S) Bern (B) Madrid (B, S) Prague (B, L) Innsbruck (B, L) Kraków (S) Chamonix (L, S) Koper (L) Guiyang (S) Chongqing (S) Salt Lake City (B) Santiago (L, S)
- Dates: 1 May – 25 October 2026

Lead
- Men: (Japan) Neo Suzuki
- Women: (United States) Annie Sanders
- Team: Japan

Boulder
- Men: (Japan) Sorato Anraku
- Women: (United Kingdom) Erin McNeice
- Team: Japan

Speed
- Men: (China) Zhao Yicheng
- Women: (United States) Emma Hunt
- Team: China

The 2026 World Climbing Series was the 38th edition of the international competition climbing series organised by World Climbing. This was the first edition known as the World Climbing Series, a change from the previous name, IFSC Climbing World Cup, following the renaming of the International Federation of Sport Climbing (IFSC) to World Climbing in December 2025.

It was held in 13 locations with 19 events per gender: six events each in the competition bouldering and competition lead climbing disciplines, and seven events in the competition speed climbing discipline. The series began on 1 May in Keqiao with the first bouldering event of the season and concluded on 25 October with the lead and speed event in Santiago.

== Scheduling ==
In October 2025, World Climbing (then known as IFSC) announced the 2026 competition schedule. The 2026 season included the first ever World Climbing Series event in Chile, with Santiago selected as the final stop of the season.

The schedule accommodated the 2026 World Climbing Youth Championship in Arco, Italy from 18 to 25 July.

== Competition format and ranking ==
The top three finishers in each individual competition receive medals, and the overall winners are awarded trophies. At the end of the season, an overall ranking is determined based upon points, which athletes are awarded for finishing in the top 80 of each individual event.

== Overview ==
No.	Location	D	G	Gold		Silver		Bronze	
1	(China) Keqiao; 1–3 May	B	M	(Japan) Sorato Anraku	84.4	(South Korea) Lee Dohyun	69.6	(France) Mejdi Schalck	59.8
1	(China) Keqiao; 1–3 May	B	W	(France) Zélia Avezou	84.8	(Slovenia) Janja Garnbret	84.6	(Australia) Oceana Mackenzie	69.6
2	(China) Wujiang; 8–10 May	L	M	(Japan) Neo Suzuki	44+	(Spain) Alberto Ginés López	39+	(South Korea) Lee Dohyun	39+
2	(China) Wujiang; 8–10 May	L	W	(United States) Annie Sanders	43+	(Slovenia) Janja Garnbret	43+	(South Korea) Seo Chae-hyun	30
2	(China) Wujiang; 8–10 May	S	M	(China) Zhao Yicheng	4.61	(China) Long Jianguo	5.63	(United States) Samuel Watson	4.71
2	(China) Wujiang; 8–10 May	S	W	(Poland) Aleksandra Kałucka	6.12	(Individual Neutral Athletes) Elizaveta Ivanova	7.62	(Indonesia) Desak Made Rita Kusuma Dewi	6.17
3	(Switzerland) Bern; 22–24 May	B	M	(Japan) Sorato Anraku	99.7	(France) Mejdi Schalck	84.3	(Belgium) Hannes Van Duysen	69.2
3	(Switzerland) Bern; 22–24 May	B	W	(Australia) Oceana Mackenzie	74.5	(United Kingdom) Erin McNeice	69.0	(United States) Annie Sanders	60.0
4	(Spain) Madrid; 28–31 May	B	M	(Japan) Sorato Anraku	99.3	(United States) Colin Duffy	74.7	(France) Samuel Richard	54.4
4	(Spain) Madrid; 28–31 May	B	W	(United Kingdom) Erin McNeice	99.1	(Japan) Melody Sekikawa	84.5	(France) Oriane Bertone	84.4
4	(Spain) Madrid; 28–31 May	S	M	(China) Chu Shouhong	4.75	(Indonesia) Antasyafi Robby Al Hilmi	4.81	(China) Yang Jie	4.84
4	(Spain) Madrid; 28–31 May	S	W	(United States) Emma Hunt	6.08	(Ukraine) Polina Khalkevych	6.39	(China) Zhang Shaoqin	6.59
5	(Czech Republic) Prague; 3–7 June	B	M	(Japan) Sorato Anraku	55.0	(South Korea) Lee Dohyun	54.8	(France) Mejdi Schalck	54.7
5	(Czech Republic) Prague; 3–7 June	B	W	(United States) Annie Sanders	84.3	(United Kingdom) Erin McNeice	84.1	(China) Zhang Yuetong	69.7
5	(Czech Republic) Prague; 3–7 June	L	M	(Indonesia) Putra Tri Ramadani	43	(Japan) Neo Suzuki	39	(Austria) Jakob Schubert	37
5	(Czech Republic) Prague; 3–7 June	L	W	(United States) Annie Sanders	37	(South Korea) Seo Chae-hyun	35	(France) Zélia Avezou	31+
6	(Austria) Innsbruck; 17–21 June	B	M	(Japan) Sorato Anraku	74.0	(Japan) Rei Kawamata	59.3	(South Korea) Lee Dohyun	59.3
6	(Austria) Innsbruck; 17–21 June	B	W	(United States) Annie Sanders	68.9	(United Kingdom) Erin McNeice	34.8	(Australia) Oceana Mackenzie	30.0
6	(Austria) Innsbruck; 17–21 June	L	M	(Japan) Neo Suzuki	42+	(Spain) Alberto Ginés López	42+	(Austria) Jakob Schubert	42
6	(Austria) Innsbruck; 17–21 June	L	W	(Slovenia) Janja Garnbret	44	(United States) Annie Sanders	38+	(South Korea) Seo Chae-hyun	36+
7	(Poland) Kraków; 3–5 July	S	M	(United States) Samuel Watson	4.60	(China) Zhao Yicheng	4.69	(Indonesia) Raharjati Nursamsa	4.79
7	(Poland) Kraków; 3–5 July	S	W	(Indonesia) Desak Made Rita Kusuma Dewi	6.54	(Poland) Natalia Kałucka	6.62	(United States) Emma Hunt	11.37
7	(Poland) Kraków; 3–5 July	SR	M	China; Long Jianguo; Chu Shouhong	11.07	United States; Samuel Watson; Zach Hammer	11.72	Ukraine; Hryhorii Ilchyshyn; Yaroslav Tkach	10.73
7	(Poland) Kraków; 3–5 July	SR	W	China; Zhou Yafei; Deng Lijuan	12.89	Poland; Natalia Kałucka; Aleksandra Kałucka	14.00	Indonesia; Desak Made Rita Kusuma Dewi; Rajiah Sallsabillah	13.14
7	(Poland) Kraków; 3–5 July	SR	X	United States; Samuel Watson; Emma Hunt	10.89	Indonesia; Antasyafi Robby Al Hilmi; Desak Made Rita Kusuma Dewi	11.30	China; Zhou Yafei; Zhao Yicheng	11.17
8	(France) Chamonix; 10–12 July	S	M	(Indonesia) Veddriq Leonardo	4.89	(Indonesia) Antasyafi Robby Al Hilmi	5.11	(Japan) Ryo Omasa	4.701
8	(France) Chamonix; 10–12 July	S	W	(Indonesia) Desak Made Rita Kusuma Dewi	6.22	(Italy) Giulia Randi	6.51	(France) Capucine Viglione	6.41
8	(France) Chamonix; 10–12 July	L	M	(Spain) Alberto Ginés López	39+	(Slovenia) Luka Potočar	38+	(Indonesia) Putra Tri Ramadani	38+
8	(France) Chamonix; 10–12 July	L	W	(United States) Annie Sanders	52+	(Bulgaria) Aleksandra Totkova	48	(South Korea) Seo Chae-hyun	47+
9	(Slovenia) Koper; 4–5 September	L	M	(Japan) Neo Suzuki	33+	(Japan) Satone Yoshida	30+	(Indonesia) Putra Tri Ramadani	28+
9	(Slovenia) Koper; 4–5 September	L	W	(Slovenia) Janja Garnbret	42+	(United States) Brooke Raboutou	33	(South Korea) Seo Chae-hyun	32+
10	(China) Guiyang; 11–13 September	S	M	(Indonesia) Antasyafi Robby Al Hilmi	4.65	(China) Ling Yongzhi	4.75	(China) Chu Shouhong	4.80
10	(China) Guiyang; 11–13 September	S	W	(China) Deng Lijuan	6.14	(Ukraine) Polina Khalkevych	6.37	(South Korea) Jeong Ji-min	6.39
10	(China) Guiyang; 11–13 September	SR	M	China; Ling Yongzhi; Zhao Yicheng	9.67	China; Shi Zechuan; Li Xu	9.87	Austria; Kevin Amon; Lukas Windischer	10.65
10	(China) Guiyang; 11–13 September	SR	W	China; Fan Jingyue; Zhang Shaoqin	13.18	Spain; Leslie Adriana Romero Pérez; Carla Martínez Vidal	14.57	South Korea; Jeong Ji-min; Sung Hanareum	13.43
10	(China) Guiyang; 11–13 September	SR	X	Indonesia; Raharjati Nursamsa; Rajiah Sallsabillah	11.35	China; Zhang Mengli; Zhou Ziyu	14.85	United States; Samuel Watson; Emma Hunt	11.85
11	(China) Chongqing; 18–20 September	S	M	(Japan) Ryo Omasa	4.78	(Germany) Leander Carmanns	4.90	(China) Zhao Yicheng	5.28
11	(China) Chongqing; 18–20 September	S	W	(United States) Emma Hunt	6.13	(China) Zhang Shaoqin	6.30	(Italy) Giulia Randi	6.53
11	(China) Chongqing; 18–20 September	SR	M	Ukraine; Hryhorii Ilchyshyn; Yaroslav Tkach	10.03	United States; Samuel Watson; Zach Hammer	FS	China; Long Jinbao; Huang Jingjie	10.11
11	(China) Chongqing; 18–20 September	SR	W	China; Fan Jingyue; Zhang Shaoqin	12.97	Indonesia; Kadek Adi Asih; Rajiah Sallsabillah	15.30	Italy; Giulia Randi; Beatrice Colli	13.08
11	(China) Chongqing; 18–20 September	SR	X	China; Mou Yuju; Ling Yongzhi	11.50	Italy; Giulia Randi; Francesco Ponzinibio	Fall	France; Jérôme Morel; Capucine Viglione	11.69
12	(United States) Salt Lake City; 16–18 October	B	M	(Israel) Yonatan Katz	69.7	(United Kingdom) Maximillian Milne	59.7	(Japan) Rei Kawamata	54.2
12	(United States) Salt Lake City; 16–18 October	B	W	(France) Oriane Bertone	84.6	(United Kingdom) Erin McNeice	69.7	(Japan) Mao Nakamura	69.6
13	(Chile) Santiago; 23–25 October	S	M	(China) Zhao Yicheng	4.74	(Indonesia) Raharjati Nursamsa	5.06	(Japan) Ryo Omasa	4.94
13	(Chile) Santiago; 23–25 October	S	W	(China) Deng Lijuan	6.38	(United States) Emma Hunt	6.98	(United States) Isis Rothfork	7.32
13	(Chile) Santiago; 23–25 October	L	M	(Switzerland) Jonas Utelli	52	(Indonesia) Putra Tri Ramadani	49	(Japan) Neo Suzuki	47+
13	(Chile) Santiago; 23–25 October	L	W	(Slovenia) Janja Garnbret	TOP	(Italy) Laura Rogora	48+	(Slovenia) Rosa Rekar	46+
OVERALL		B	M	(Japan) Sorato Anraku	5049	(South Korea) Lee Dohyun	3095	(France) Mejdi Schalck	2900
OVERALL		B	W	(United Kingdom) Erin McNeice	4545	(Australia) Oceana Mackenzie	4080	(United States) Annie Sanders	3755
OVERALL		L	M	(Japan) Neo Suzuki	4820	(Indonesia) Putra Tri Ramadani	4175	(Spain) Alberto Ginés López	3455
OVERALL		L	W	(United States) Annie Sanders	4415	(Slovenia) Janja Garnbret	3805	(South Korea) Seo Chae-hyun	3565
OVERALL		S	M	(China) Zhao Yicheng	4485	(Japan) Ryo Omasa	4290	(Indonesia) Raharjati Nursamsa	3810
OVERALL		S	W	(United States) Emma Hunt	4441	(Ukraine) Polina Khalkevych	3620	(Indonesia) Desak Made Rita Kusuma Dewi	3450

== Bouldering ==
The overall ranking is determined based upon points, which athletes are awarded for finishing in the top 80 of each individual event. The end-of-season standings are based on the sum of points earned. The national ranking is the sum of the points of that country's three best male and female athletes.

=== Men ===
The results of the ten most successful athletes of the Bouldering World Climbing Series 2026:

Rank	Name	Points	Keqiao	Bern	Madrid	Prague	Innsbruck	Salt Lake City
1	(Japan) Sorato Anraku	5049	1. 1000	1. 1000	1. 1000	1. 1000	1. 1000	29. 48.7
2	(South Korea) Lee Dohyun	3095	2. 805	18. 185	4. 610	2. 805	3. 690	-
3	(France) Mejdi Schalck	2900	3. 690	2. 805	10. 350	3. 690	29. 52	11. 313
4	(Japan) Rei Kawamata	2660	12. 300	11. 325	15. 240	12. 300	2. 805	3. 690
5	(United Kingdom) Maximillian Milne	2442	22. 130	6. 495	29. 52	5. 545	8. 415	2. 805
6	(Belgium) Hannes Van Duysen	2345	7. 455	3. 690	9. 380	11. 325	6. 495	-
7	(Japan) Sohta Amagasa	2083	19. 170	4. 610	27. 68	19. 170	7. 455	4. 610
8	(United States) Colin Duffy	2018	-	8. 415	2. 805	9. 380	21. 137.5	13. 280
9	(China) Pan Yufei	1855	5. 545	25. 89.5	12. 300	10. 350	10. 350	16. 220
10	(Israel) Adi Bark	1624	20. 155	5. 545	11. 325	41. 13.5	11. 325	14. 260

=== Women ===
The results of the ten most successful athletes of the Bouldering World Climbing Series 2026:

Rank	Name	Points	Keqiao	Bern	Madrid	Prague	Innsbruck	Salt Lake City
1	(United Kingdom) Erin McNeice	4545	11. 325	2. 805	1. 1000	2. 805	2. 805	2. 805
2	(Australia) Oceana Mackenzie	4080	3. 690	1. 1000	5. 545	5. 545	3. 690	4. 610
3	(United States) Annie Sanders	3755	4. 610	3. 690	-	1. 1000	1. 1000	7. 455
4	(France) Oriane Bertone	3560	5. 545	7. 455	3. 690	11. 325	5. 545	1. 1000
5	(Japan) Melody Sekikawa	3165	7. 455	5. 545	2. 805	4. 610	17. 205	5. 545
6	(China) Zhang Yuetong	2625	9. 380	15. 240	9. 380	3. 690	4. 610	11. 325
7	(Japan) Mao Nakamura	2472	32. 37	6. 495	7. 455	6. 495	12. 300	3. 690
8	(France) Zélia Avezou	2410	1. 1000	11. 325	-	7. 455	13. 280	10. 350
9	(Japan) Anon Matsufuji	2260	10. 350	25. 89.5	4. 610	8. 415	9. 380	8. 415
10	(Israel) Ayala Kerem	2165	-	9. 380	6. 495	12. 300	6. 495	6. 495

== Lead ==
The overall ranking is determined based upon points, which athletes are awarded for finishing in the top 80 of each individual event. The end-of-season standings are based on the sum of points earned. The national ranking is the sum of the points of that country's three best male and female athletes.

=== Men ===
The results of the ten most successful athletes of the Lead World Climbing Series 2026:

Rank	Name	Points	Wujiang	Prague	Innsbruck	Chamonix	Koper	Santiago
1	(Japan) Neo Suzuki	4820	1. 1000	2. 805	1. 1000	11. 325	1. 1000	3. 690
2	(Indonesia) Putra Tri Ramadani	4175	9. 380	1. 1000	4. 610	3. 690	3. 690	2. 805
3	(Spain) Alberto Ginés López	3455	2. 805	12. 300	2. 805	1. 1000	22. 130	8. 415
4	(Japan) Satone Yoshida	3155	4. 610	8. 415	14. 260	7. 455	2. 805	4. 610
5	(Japan) Sorato Anraku	2870	5. 545	4. 610	7. 455	8. 415	10. 350	6. 495
6	(France) Sam Avezou	2675	6. 495	9. 380	15. 240	6. 495	4. 610	7. 455
7	(Slovenia) Luka Potočar	2510	10. 350	6. 495	6. 495	2. 805	24. 105	14. 260
8	(South Korea) Lee Dohyun	2415	3. 690	15. 240	9. 380	4. 610	6. 495	-
9	(Italy) Filip Schenk	1910	7. 455	7. 455	20. 155	12. 300	5. 545	-
10	(Austria) Jakob Schubert	1760	-	3. 690	3. 690	9. 380	-	-

=== Women ===
The results of the ten most successful athletes of the Lead World Climbing Series 2026:

Rank	Name	Points	Wujiang	Prague	Innsbruck	Chamonix	Koper	Santiago
1	(United States) Annie Sanders	4415	1. 1000	1. 1000	2. 805	1. 1000	4. 610	-
2	(Slovenia) Janja Garnbret	3805	2. 805	-	1. 1000	-	1. 1000	1. 1000
3	(South Korea) Seo Chae-hyun	3565	3. 690	2. 805	3. 690	3. 690	3. 690	-
4	(Slovenia) Rosa Rekar	2881	5. 545	44. 10.66	5. 545	5. 545	5. 545	3. 690
5	(Austria) Jessica Pilz	2395	12. 300	4. 610	6. 495	6. 495	6. 495	-
6	(France) Zélia Avezou	1900	11. 325	3. 690	19. 170	14. 260	7. 455	-
7	(United Kingdom) Erin McNeice	1830	4. 610	-	4. 610	4. 610	-	-
8	(South Korea) Kim Ja In	1805	16. 220	8. 415	9. 365	7. 455	10. 350	-
9	(Japan) Ryu Nakagawa	1760	10. 350	14. 260	12. 300	23. 120	18. 185	5. 545
10	(United States) Ella Fisher	1739	9. 380	5. 545	22. 130	27. 64	17. 205	8. 415

== Speed ==
The overall ranking is determined based upon points, which athletes are awarded for finishing in the top 80 of each individual event. The end-of-season standings are based on the sum of points earned. The national ranking is the sum of the points of that country's three best male and female athletes.

=== Men ===
The results of the ten most successful athletes of the Speed World Climbing Series 2026:

Rank	Name	Points	Wujiang	Madrid	Kraków	Chamonix	Guiyang	Chongqing	Santiago
1	(China) Zhao Yicheng	4485	1. 1000	-	2. 805	4. 610	9. 380	3. 690	1. 1000
2	(Japan) Ryo Omasa	4290	6. 495	14. 260	5. 545	3. 690	4. 610	1. 1000	3. 690
3	(Indonesia) Raharjati Nursamsa	3810	5. 545	5. 545	3. 690	18. 185	5. 545	6. 495	2. 805
4	(Indonesia) Antasyafi Robby Al Hilmi	3789	19. 170	2. 805	26. 84	2. 805	1. 1000	5. 545	9. 380
5	(United States) Samuel Watson	3285	3. 690	-	1. 1000	6. 495	10. 350	17. 205	5. 545
6	(China) Chu Shouhong	3270	17. 205	1. 1000	4. 610	20. 155	3. 690	-	4. 610
7	(China) Ling Yongzhi	2685	14. 250	9. 380	12. 300	12. 300	2. 805	18. 185	7. 455
8	(China) Long Jianguo	2465	2. 805	11. 325	9. 380	5. 545	17. 205	-	17. 205
9	(Germany) Leander Carmanns	2370	-	8. 415	11. 325	15. 240	19. 170	2. 805	8. 415
10	(United States) Michael Hom	2268	4. 610	6. 495	17. 205	16. 220	50. 8	9. 380	10. 350

=== Women ===
The results of the ten most successful athletes of the Speed World Climbing Series 2026:

Rank	Name	Points	Wujiang	Madrid	Kraków	Chamonix	Guiyang	Chongqing	Santiago
1	(United States) Emma Hunt	4441	37. 21	1. 1000	3. 690	5. 545	9. 380	1. 1000	2. 805
2	(Ukraine) Polina Khalkevych	3620	10. 350	2. 805	7. 455	7. 455	2. 805	17. 205	5. 545
3	(Indonesia) Desak Made Rita Kusuma Dewi	3450	3. 690	9. 380	1. 1000	1. 1000	-	-	9. 380
4	(China) Mou Yuju	3045	7. 455	4. 610	8. 415	11. 325	10. 350	13. 280	4. 610
5	(Spain) Leslie Adriana Romero Pérez	2950	19. 170	5. 545	5. 545	8. 415	19. 170	4. 610	6. 495
6	(China) Zhang Shaoqin	2850	5. 545	3. 690	18. 185	12. 300	11. 325	2. 805	-
7	(China) Deng Lijuan	2790	15. 240	-	19. 170	9. 380	1. 1000	-	1. 1000
8	(Italy) Giulia Randi	2780	34. 30	12. 300	11. 325	2. 805	13. 280	3. 690	10. 350
9	(United States) Isis Rothfork	2715	8. 415	18. 185	17. 205	4. 610	20. 155	7. 455	3. 690
10	(Poland) Aleksandra Kałucka	2396	1. 1000	33. 33	6. 495	6. 495	-	11. 325	30. 48

== Speed Relay ==
The overall ranking is determined based upon points, which countries are awarded for all teams finishing in the top 80 of each event. The end-of-season standings are based on the sum of points earned.

=== Men ===
The results of the ten most successful countries of the Speed Relay World Climbing Series 2026:

Rank	Name	Points	Kraków	Guiyang	Chongqing
1	China	3300	1. 1000	1. 1000	
1	China	3300	6. 495	2. 805	
2	Italy	1539	8. 415	5. 545	
2	Italy	1539	26. 84	6. 495	
3	Indonesia	1535	4. 610	9. 380	
3	Indonesia	1535	5. 545	-	
4	United States	1203	2. 805	11. 325	
4	United States	1203	27. 73	-	
5	Austria	1120	12. 300	3. 690	
5	Austria	1120	22. 130	-	
6	Germany	1065	7. 455	10. 350	
6	Germany	1065	14. 260	-	
7	Ukraine	990	3. 690	12. 300	
8	Japan	880	15. 240	7. 455	
8	Japan	880	18. 185	-	
9	Canada	765	20. 155	4. 610	
10	Kazakhstan	585	9. 380	-	
10	Kazakhstan	585	17. 205	-	
10	South Korea	585	19. 170	8. 415	
10	Switzerland	585	11. 325	14. 260	

=== Women ===
The results of the ten most successful countries of the Speed Relay World Climbing Series 2026:

Rank	Name	Points	Kraków	Guiyang	Chongqing
1	China	2910	1. 1000	1. 1000	
1	China	2910	8. 415	6. 495	
2	Spain	1415	4. 610	2. 805	
3	Indonesia	1372.5	3. 690	5. 545	
3	Indonesia	1372.5	T20-23. 137.5	-	
4	Poland	1350	2. 805	-	
4	Poland	1350	5. 545	-	
5	Italy	1220	7. 455	8. 415	
5	Italy	1220	10. 350	-	
6	France	1195	9. 380	4. 610	
6	France	1195	17. 205	-	
7	South Korea	1185	6. 495	3. 690	
8	Japan	1160	11. 325	7. 455	
8	Japan	1160	-	9. 380	
9	United States	787.5	12. 300	10. 350	
9	United States	787.5	T20-23. 137.5	-	
10	Kazakhstan	565	15. 240	11. 325	

=== Mixed ===
The results of the ten most successful countries of the Speed Relay World Climbing Series 2026:

Rank	Name	Points	Kraków	Guiyang	Chongqing
1	Indonesia	3835	2. 805	1. 1000	6. 495
1	Indonesia	3835	4. 610	5. 545	9. 380
2	China	3745	3. 690	2. 805	1. 1000
2	China	3745	5. 545	9. 380	11. 325
3	United States	3008	1. 1000	3. 690	5. 545
3	United States	3008	27. 73	10. 350	10. 350
4	Italy	3005	7. 455	7. 455	2. 805
4	Italy	3005	9. 380	12. 300	4. 610
5	France	1705	12. 300	4. 610	3. 690
5	France	1705	24. 105	-	-
6	Ukraine	1535	6. 495	8. 415	7. 455
6	Ukraine	1535	19. 170	-	-
7	Japan	1160	10. 350	11. 325	13. 280
7	Japan	1160	17. 205	-	-
8	South Korea	1085	15. 240	6. 495	-
8	South Korea	1085	21. 145	17. 205	-
9	Germany	1018	14. 260	13. 280	8. 415
9	Germany	1018	28. 63	-	-
10	Spain	910	8. 415	-	19. 170
10	Spain	910	11. 325	-	-

== Season podium table ==
Rank	Nation	Gold	Silver	Bronze	Total
1	Japan (JPN)	2	1	0	3
2	United States (USA)	2	0	1	3
3	China (CHN)	1	0	0	1
3	Great Britain (GBR)	1	0	0	1
5	Indonesia (INA)	0	1	2	3
6	South Korea (KOR)	0	1	1	2
7	Australia (AUS)	0	1	0	1
7	Slovenia (SLO)	0	1	0	1
7	Ukraine (UKR)	0	1	0	1
10	France (FRA)	0	0	1	1
10	Spain (ESP)	0	0	1	1
Totals (11 entries)		6	6	6	18

== Medal table ==
Rank	Nation	Gold	Silver	Bronze	Total
1	China (CHN)	11	6	7	24
2	United States (USA)	9	6	5	20
3	Japan (JPN)	9	4	5	18
4	Indonesia (INA)	6	6	5	17
5	Slovenia (SLO)	3	3	1	7
6	France (FRA)	2	1	7	10
7	Great Britain (GBR)	1	5	0	6
8	Spain (ESP)	1	3	0	4
9	Ukraine (UKR)	1	2	1	4
10	Poland (POL)	1	2	0	3
11	Australia (AUS)	1	0	2	3
12	Israel (ISR)	1	0	0	1
12	Switzerland (SUI)	1	0	0	1
14	South Korea (KOR)	0	3	8	11
15	Italy (ITA)	0	3	2	5
16	Bulgaria (BUL)	0	1	0	1
16	Germany (GER)	0	1	0	1
16	Individual Neutral Athletes (AIN)	0	1	0	1
19	Austria (AUT)	0	0	3	3
20	Belgium (BEL)	0	0	1	1
Totals (20 entries)		47	47	47	141
