= Melody Sekikawa =

Japanese competition climber (born 2007)

Personal information
- Nationality: Japanese
- Born: July 30, 2007 (age 19) Hachinohe, Aomori, Japan
- Height: 161 cm (5 ft 3 in)

Climbing career
- Type of climber: Competition bouldering
Medal record
Women's competition climbing
Representing Japan
World Cup (Event)
Silver medal – second place	Madrid 2026	Boulder
Bronze medal – third place	Prague 2025	Boulder
Asian Championships
Silver medal – second place	Meishan 2026	Boulder

Melody Sekikawa (関川 愛音 Sekikawa Melody; born July 30, 2007) is a Japanese competition climber who specializes in competition bouldering.

== Climbing career ==
=== Competition climbing ===
Sekikawa made her senior international competition climbing debut in 2023.

In June 2025, Sekikawa finished on the podium for the first time at the World Cup event in Prague, collecting the bronze medal.

In 2025, Sekikawa's consistent showing in 5 of the 6 bouldering World Cup finals secured her 4th place in the Overall World Cup Ranking. She was also ranked second-highest in Japan's highly competitive women's national team.

Sekikawa started her 2026 season at the Asian Championships, making it to the final where she placed second behind Ai Mori. Her success continued at the 2026 World Climbing Series, making three consecutive finals appearances in Keqiao, Bern and Madrid. She notably won silver, her second World Climbing Series medal, in Madrid.

== Rankings ==
=== World Cup ===
Discipline	2023	2024	2025	2026
Boulder	18	12	4	5

=== World Championships ===
Discipline	Seoul 2025
Boulder	13

=== Japan Cup ===
Discipline	2023	2024	2025	2026
Boulder	3	7	2	3
