= Boulder Japan Cup 2025 =

Annual competition climbing event

- Venue: Komazawa Indoor Ball Sports Field
- Location: Tokyo, Japan
- Date: 1 – 2 February 2025
- Website: https://www.jma-climbing.org/competition/2025/bjc/

Medalists
gold medal	Sorato Anraku / Miho Nonaka
silver medal	Yuji Fujiwaki / Melody Sekikawa
bronze medal	Rei Sugimoto / Mao Nakamura

The 2025 Boulder Japan Cup (BJC) was the 20th edition of the annual competition bouldering event organised by the Japan Mountaineering and Sport Climbing Association (JMSCA), held in Komazawa Olympic Park, Tokyo.

BJC is the sole selection event for Japan’s national bouldering team. Athletes who place highly at the BJC are eligible to compete in the Boulder World Cups, subject to JMSCA's prevailing selection criteria. BJC 2025 was the first domestic competition of the 2025 season. 52 men and 53 women competed, with Sorato Anraku and Miho Nonaka winning the men’s and women’s titles respectively.

== Finals ==
=== Men ===
The men's bouldering finals took place on 2 February 2025.

Rank	Athlete	Boulder				Total
Rank	Athlete	1	2	3	4	Total
1	Sorato Anraku	25	9	25	25	84
2	Yuji Fujiwaki	10	9.4	24.8	24.9	69.1
3	Rei Sugimoto	24.9	0	25	10	59.9
4	Yusuke Sugimoto	24.9	0	24.7	9.8	59.4
5	Tomoa Narasaki	10	9.8	25	10	54.8
6	Kento Yamaguchi	10	9.4	25	10	54.4
7	Daiki Sano	10	9.1	9.8	9.9	38.8
8	Keita Dohi	10	0	9.8	0	19.8

=== Women ===
The women's bouldering finals took place on 2 February 2025.

Rank	Athlete	Boulder				Total
Rank	Athlete	1	2	3	4	Total
1	Miho Nonaka	25	25	24.9	9.9	84.8
2	Melody Sekikawa	25	9.7	25	24.9	84.6
3	Mao Nakamura	25	25	25	9.5	84.5
4	Futaba Ito	25	24.8	25	0	74.8
5	Mashiro Kuzuu	24.7	9.6	10	24.8	69.1
6	Kaho Murakoshi	9.5	24.7	9.9	24.9	69
7	Ai Mori	24.8	10	25	0	59.8
8	Anon Matsufuji	25	9.9	10	9.9	54.8

== Semifinals ==
=== Men ===
The men's bouldering semifinals took place on 2 February 2025.

Rank	Athlete	Boulder				Total	Notes
Rank	Athlete	1	2	3	4	Total	Notes
1	Sorato Anraku	25	24.9	25	25	99.9	Q
2	Kento Yamaguchi	24.9	24.9	25	25	99.8	Q
3	Yusuke Sugimoto	24.8	25	24.9	24.9	99.6	Q
4	Daiki Sano	24.8	24.8	24.6	9.9	84.1	Q
5	Tomoa Narasaki	9.8	24.7	25	10	69.5	Q
6	Yuji Fujiwaki	10	24.8	24.3	9.8	68.9	Q
7	Rei Sugimoto	9.7	9	24.9	25	68.6	Q
8	Keita Dohi	0	25	24.8	9.8	59.6	Q
9	Rei Kawamata	24.8	24.5	0	10	59.3	
10	Ritsu Kayotani	9.8	24.6	9.6	10	54	
11	Kokoro Fujii	0	24.9	0	25	49.9	
12	Sohta Amagasa	0	24.7	0	24.8	49.5	
13	Satone Yoshida	9.9	24.9	0	9.9	44.7	
14	Junta Sekiguchi	9.7	9.5	9.9	9.8	38.9	
15	Ao Yurikusa	0	24.8	0	10	34.8	
16	Neo Suzuki	0	24.7	0	10	34.7	
17	Mahiro Takami	9.8	9.3	0	10	29.1	
18	Yuta Imaizumi	9.9	0	0	9.9	19.8	
19	Masaki Saito	0	9.7	0	9.8	19.5	
20	Masahiro Higuchi	0	0	0	9.5	9.5	

=== Women ===
The women's bouldering semifinals took place on 2 February 2025.

Rank	Athlete	Boulder				Total	Notes
Rank	Athlete	1	2	3	4	Total	Notes
1	Anon Matsufuji	10	24.9	25	24.9	84.8	Q
2	Futaba Ito	25	25	24.8	9.8	84.6	Q
3	Ai Mori	25	24.9	9.8	24.7	84.4	Q
4	Miho Nonaka	24.9	24.9	24.9	0	74.7	Q
5	Mao Nakamura	25	25	24.6	0	74.6	Q
6	Melody Sekikawa	24.7	25	24.8	0	74.5	Q
7	Kaho Murakoshi	24.7	24.4	9.7	0	58.8	Q
8	Mashiro Kuzuu	24.9	25	0	0	49.9	Q
9	Manami Yama	24.9	25	0	0	49.9	
10	Yui Suezawa	24.9	24.9	0	0	49.8	
11	Miku Ishii	24.7	25	0	0	49.7	
12	Nanami Nobe	24.7	25	0	0	49.7	
13	Momoka Kaneko	24.5	25	0	0	49.5	
14	Yuno Harigae	0	24.9	9.9	0	34.8	
15	Serika Okawachi	8.3	24.8	0	0	33.1	
16	Nanako Kura	0	25	0	0	25	
17	Ai Takeuchi	0	24.9	0	0	24.9	
18	Kohana Mugishima	0	24.9	0	0	24.9	
19	Ren Koyamatsu	0	24.9	0	0	24.9	
20	Natsumi Oda	0	24.6	0	0	24.6	

== Qualifications ==
=== Men ===
The men's bouldering qualifications took place on 1 February 2025.

Rank	Athlete	Boulder					Total	Notes
Rank	Athlete	1	2	3	4	5	Total	Notes
1	Kento Yamaguchi	25	25	25	24.8	24.8	124.6	Q
2	Sorato Anraku	25	24.7	25	24.9	24.9	124.5	Q
2	Yusuke Sugimoto	25	25	24.8	24.9	24.8	124.5	Q
4	Rei Kawamata	25	24.7	24.5	25	24.8	124	Q
5	Yuji Fujiwaki	25	9.5	24.9	24.7	25	109.1	Q
6	Yuta Imaizumi	25	0	24.9	25	24.8	99.7	Q
7	Neo Suzuki	25	24.8	9.9	24.9	9.9	94.5	Q
8	Ritsu Kayotani	25	9.9	9.8	24.9	24.8	94.4	Q
9	Kokoro Fujii	25	24.8	9.6	9.7	24.9	94	Q
10	Satone Yoshida	24.9	9.3	9.8	24.8	25	93.8	Q
10	Junta Sekiguchi	24.7	24.6	9.7	24.8	10	93.8	Q
12	Keita Dohi	24.9	25	0	10	25	84.9	Q
13	Masaki Saito	25	0	25	25	9.8	84.8	Q
14	Tomoa Narasaki	25	25	0	24.8	9.9	84.7	Q
15	Mahiro Takami	24.9	25	0	24.8	9.9	84.6	Q
16	Rei Sugimoto	25	9.6	0	24.9	25	84.5	Q
17	Masahiro Higuchi	25	9.7	0	24.7	25	84.4	Q
18	Daiki Sano	24.9	9.9	10	9.9	24.9	79.6	Q
19	Sohta Amagasa	25	10	24.8	9.6	10	79.4	Q
19	Ao Yurikusa	25	24.6	9.9	10	9.9	79.4	Q
21	Taiga Sakamoto	25	9.1	24.9	10	9.9	78.9	
22	Hiroto Shimizu	25	9.8	9.9	9.5	24.6	78.8	
23	Ryo Omasa	24.7	0	24.9	0	24.8	74.4	
24	Keita Watabe	9.8	24.9	0	9.9	10	54.6	
25	Hayato Tsuru	24.9	9.8	0	9.9	9.9	54.5	
26	Yoshiyuki Ogata	25	0	9.7	9.9	9.8	54.4	
27	Eito Tamiya	24.8	9.4	0	9.7	10	53.9	
28	Hareru Nagamori	24.5	9.9	9.5	0	9.8	53.7	
29	Hayato Nakamura	0	0	24.6	24.8	0	49.4	
30	Yuki Oshi	9.7	10	10	9.7	9.7	49.1	
31	Aki Shinozawa	24.8	0	0	9.9	9.9	44.6	
32	Kisato Wada	24.8	0	10	0	9.7	44.5	
33	Meichi Narasaki	10	24.4	0	0	10	44.4	
34	Ryohei Kameyama	9.6	9.8	24.8	0	0	44.2	
35	Ryoei Nukui	9.9	0	10	9.9	10	39.8	
36	Kodai Yamada	10	0	9.5	10	10	39.5	
37	Haruyoshi Morimoto	9.9	9.8	9.7	0	9.9	39.3	
37	Toru Kofukuda	9.9	9.6	0	9.8	10	39.3	
39	Yuta Kayotani	9.5	0	10	9.5	10	39	
40	Rei Sasaki	0	0	24.7	0	9.6	34.3	
40	Haruto Imai	24.9	0	9.4	0	0	34.3	
42	Reo Matsuoka	10	9.7	0	0	10	29.7	
42	Mizuki Ogane	9.9	0	10	9.8	0	29.7	
44	Fuuya Goto	9.7	0	10	0	9.7	29.4	
45	Tomoaki Takata	9.6	9.8	0	0	9.8	29.2	
46	Reo Yoshii	0	25	0	0	0	25	
47	Rikuto Inohana	10	0	0	0	10	20	
48	Shuhei Yukimaru	0	0	10	9.7	0	19.7	
49	Yosui Sasahara	9.6	0	0	0	10	19.6	
50	Kei Hommyo	9.5	0	9.8	0	0	19.3	
51	Sota Hatakeyama	0	0	0	9.8	0	9.8	
52	Ren Taniguchi	0	0	0	0	0	0	

=== Women ===
The women's bouldering qualifications took place on 1 February 2025.

Rank	Athlete	Boulder					Total	Notes
Rank	Athlete	1	2	3	4	5	Total	Notes
1	Anon Matsufuji	25	24.9	24.9	25	25	124.8	Q
2	Futaba Ito	25	25	25	25	24.9	124.7	Q
3	Mao Nakamura	24.9	24.8	25	24.9	25	124.6	Q
4	Miho Nonaka	25	25	24.9	25	10	109.9	Q
5	Mashiro Kuzuu	25	24.7	24.9	24.8	10	109.4	Q
6	Ai Mori	25	24.4	25	24.7	9.9	109	Q
7	Melody Sekikawa	25	25	25	0	25	100	Q
8	Ai Takeuchi	24.9	9.7	25	25	10	94.6	Q
9	Kaho Murakoshi	24.8	24.7	24.9	0	10	84.4	Q
10	Serika Okawachi	24.7	0	24.5	25	10	84.2	Q
11	Nanako Kura	24.8	10	24.5	9.9	9.9	79.1	Q
12	Momoka Kaneko	24.8	24.8	24.5	0	0	74.1	Q
13	Yuno Harigae	25	9.9	24.9	0	10	69.8	Q
14	Miku Ishii	25	9.7	24.9	0	9.9	69.5	Q
15	Yui Suezawa	24.8	9.9	25	9.8	0	69.5	Q
16	Nanami Nobe	24.9	9.6	24.9	0	9.7	69.1	Q
16	Kohana Mugishima	25	10	24.7	0	9.4	69.1	Q
18	Natsumi Oda	24.7	24.8	9.6	0	9.9	69	Q
19	Ren Koyamatsu	24.4	9.6	9.2	10	10	63.2	Q
20	Manami Yama	24.9	10	25	0	0	59.9	Q
21	Sora Ito	24.7	0	24.9	0	10	59.6	
22	Riru Ueda	25	0	24.5	0	9.6	59.1	
23	Ichika Osawa	24.4	9.1	24.7	0	0	58.2	
24	Hina Sato	25	10	9.9	0	10	54.9	
25	Mia Aoyagi	24.6	10	9.9	0	10	54.5	
25	Mio Nukui	24.9	9.8	9.8	0	10	54.5	
27	Souka Hasegawa	10	9.6	24.7	0	9.9	54.2	
28	Matsuda Kiki	10	9.5	24.5	0	10	54	
29	Yu Ito	24.8	9.5	9.6	0	9.8	53.7	
30	Natsumi Hirano	10	0	24.5	9.7	9.3	53.5	
31	Tsukushi Yamauchi	9.9	9.2	9.3	9.7	10	48.1	
32	Izumi Yamada	10	0	24.5	0	9.6	44.1	
33	Kaho Yamane	9.9	0	9.7	9.9	10	39.5	
34	Sana Ogura	9.9	9.7	9.8	0	10	39.4	
35	Nagako Nakata	9.8	0	9.8	9.9	9.7	39.2	
36	Ryo Nakajima	10	9.3	9.9	0	9.5	38.7	
37	Ayaka Kaji	9.9	9.3	9.7	0	9.7	38.6	
38	Aya Sugawara	25	0	0	0	10	35	
39	Saya Ishiguro	10	0	24.9	0	0	34.9	
40	Mizuho Tashima	10	0	9.9	0	9.9	29.8	
41	Kiho Nanba	9.9	0	9.7	0	10	29.6	
42	Chihiro Kaneko	10	9.7	9.8	0	0	29.5	
42	Kokoro Takata	10	0	9.7	0	9.8	29.5	
44	Serina Koyama	9.8	9.2	9.6	0	0	28.6	
45	Michika Nagashima	10	0	0	0	9.8	19.8	
45	Hanasa Takahashi	10	0	9.8	0	0	19.8	
47	Hatsune Takeishi	9.8	0	9.9	0	0	19.7	
47	Misa Inoue	9.9	0	9.8	0	0	19.7	
49	Mei Kinoshita	9.8	0	9.8	0	0	19.6	
49	Natsuki Shiori	9.9	0	9.7	0	0	19.6	
51	Runa Iuchi	9.9	0	9.6	0	0	19.5	
52	Hanao Inoue	9.9	0	0	0	0	9.9	
53	Miu Ito	9.8	0	0	0	0	9.8	
