= Boulder Japan Cup 2026 =

Annual competition climbing event

- Venue: Komazawa Indoor Ball Sports Field
- Location: Tokyo, Japan
- Date: 31 January – 1 February 2026
- Website: https://www.jma-climbing.org/competition/2026/bjc/

Medalists
gold medal	Meichi Narasaki / Futaba Ito
silver medal	Tomoa Narasaki / Miho Nonaka
bronze medal	Sorato Anraku / Melody Sekikawa

The 2026 Boulder Japan Cup (BJC) was the 21st edition of the annual competition bouldering event organised by the Japan Mountaineering and Sport Climbing Association (JMSCA), held in Komazawa Olympic Park, Tokyo.

BJC is the sole selection event for Japan’s national bouldering team. Athletes who place highly at the BJC are eligible to compete in the Boulder World Cups, subject to JMSCA's prevailing selection criteria. BJC 2026 was the first domestic competition of the 2026 season. 50 men and 50 women competed, with Meichi Narasaki and Futaba Ito winning the men’s and women’s titles respectively, repeating their victories from the Boulder Japan Cup 2023.

== Finals ==
=== Men ===
The men's bouldering finals took place on 1 February 2026.

Rank	Athlete	Boulder				Total
Rank	Athlete	1	2	3	4	Total
1	Meichi Narasaki	24.9	25	25	10	84.9
2	Tomoa Narasaki	24.9	25	9.6	9.8	69.3
3	Sorato Anraku	24.9	25	0	10	59.9
4	Keita Dohi	24.8	24.7	10	0	59.5
5	Rei Kawamata	10	25	0	10	45
6	Daiki Sano	24.4	9.8	9.8	0	44
7	Yusuke Sugimoto	24.8	0	0	9.9	34.7
8	Aki Shinozawa	10	9.9	0	0	19.9

=== Women ===
The women's bouldering finals took place on 1 February 2026.

Rank	Athlete	Boulder				Total
Rank	Athlete	1	2	3	4	Total
1	Futaba Ito	25	24.9	24.9	10	84.8
2	Miho Nonaka	25	24.7	24.8	10	84.5
3	Melody Sekikawa	10	24.9	24.8	9.9	69.6
4	Mao Nakamura	10	24.9	24.7	0	59.6
5	Ai Mori	24.9	9.2	24.8	0	58.9
6	Anon Matsufuji	10	9.4	24.6	10	54
7	Mia Aoyagi	9.9	0	0	24.9	34.8
8	Nanako Kura	10	0	0	0	10

== Semifinals ==
=== Men ===
The men's bouldering semifinals took place on 1 February 2026.

Rank	Athlete	Boulder				Total	Notes
Rank	Athlete	1	2	3	4	Total	Notes
1	Sorato Anraku	0	24.9	25	25	74.9	Q
2	Meichi Narasaki	0	25	24.9	25	74.9	Q
3	Yusuke Sugimoto	0	24.8	24.6	24.8	74.2	Q
4	Rei Kawamata	9.4	24.6	9.9	24.8	68.7	Q
5	Tomoa Narasaki	25	24.8	10	0	59.8	Q
6	Daiki Sano	24.7	24.9	0	10	59.6	Q
7	Keita Dohi	0	25	9.5	24.9	59.4	Q
8	Aki Shinozawa	24.5	10	9.8	10	54.3	Q
9	Kento Yamaguchi	9.2	24.7	9.7	10	53.6	
10	Kodai Yamada	0	24.9	10	9.9	44.8	
11	Yoshiyuki Ogata	0	24.9	9.8	10	44.7	
12	Yuji Fujiwaki	9	24.8	0	9.8	43.6	
13	Ao Yurikusa	0	24	9.3	10	43.3	
14	Ryo Omasa	0	9.9	9.9	10	29.8	
15	Manato Kurashiki	0	10	9.7	10	29.7	
16	Keita Watabe	10	10	0	0	20	
17	Yuta Imaizumi	0	0	9.9	10	19.9	
18	Junta Sekiguchi	0	0	9.8	9.9	19.7	
19	Hiroto Shimizu	0	9.6	9.8	0	19.4	
20	Kokoro Fujii	0	0	9.6	9.8	19.4	
21	Taiga Sakamoto	0	9.2	0	10	19.2	
22	Yosui Sasahara	0	0	0	10	10	
23	Yuta Kayotani	0	0	9.8	0	9.8	
24	Eito Tamiya	0	9.8	0	0	9.8	

=== Women ===
The women's bouldering semifinals took place on 1 February 2026.

Rank	Athlete	Boulder				Total	Notes
Rank	Athlete	1	2	3	4	Total	Notes
1	Melody Sekikawa	25	24.9	24.6	24.9	99.4	Q
2	Mao Nakamura	25	25	24.8	10	84.8	Q
3	Futaba Ito	25	25	24.7	10	84.7	Q
4	Anon Matsufuji	25	25	24.5	10	84.5	Q
5	Nanako Kura	24.9	24.9	24.7	9.9	84.4	Q
6	Ai Mori	25	25	0	24.8	74.8	Q
7	Mia Aoyagi	25	0	24.8	24.9	74.7	Q
8	Miho Nonaka	25	24.8	9.8	10	69.6	Q
9	Manami Yama	9.6	24.9	24.5	10	69	
10	Yui Suezawa	9.3	24.8	24.5	9.9	68.5	
11	Kaho Murakoshi	24.7	0	25	9.9	59.6	
12	Akane Matsuura	9.9	24.8	9.5	9.9	54.1	
13	Moka Mochizuki	9.9	0	24.8	10	44.7	
14	Ren Koyamatsu	25	9.7	9.8	0	44.5	
15	Nanami Nobe	10	24.8	9.6	0	44.4	
16	Chihiro Kaneko	9.9	0	24.4	10	44.3	
17	Nagi Karino	9.5	24.8	0	9.7	44	
18	Momoka Kaneko	9.2	9.8	24.4	0	43.4	
19	Kohana Mugishima	0	0	24.8	10	34.8	
20	Miku Ishii	24.7	0	9.4	0	34.1	
21	Sora Ito	9.9	9.4	0	9.8	29.1	
22	Ai Takeuchi	9.7	9.9	9.5	0	29.1	
23	Serika Okawachi	9.9	0	9.3	0	19.2	
24	Yuno Harigae	9.1	0	0	10	19.1	
25	Yuno Tokutake	9.4	0	9.4	0	18.8	

== Qualifications ==
=== Men ===
The men's bouldering qualifications took place on 31 January 2026.

Rank	Athlete	Boulder					Total	Notes
Rank	Athlete	1	2	3	4	5	Total	Notes
1	Sorato Anraku	25	25	25	24.9	25	124.9	Q
2	Kodai Yamada	25	24.8	24.9	25	25	124.7	Q
3	Rei Kawamata	25	24.8	24.6	25	24.9	124.3	Q
4	Keita Dohi	25	24.9	24.7	24.7	24.8	124.1	Q
5	Yuji Fujiwaki	24.5	24.8	10	24.9	25	109.2	Q
6	Yusuke Sugimoto	25	24.8	9.4	24.9	24.9	109	Q
7	Tomoa Narasaki	10	24.7	10	25	25	94.7	Q
8	Junta Sekiguchi	25	9.8	24.5	10	24.7	94	Q
9	Taiga Sakamoto	10	0	24.7	25	25	84.7	Q
10	Ryo Omasa	24.9	9.8	0	24.9	24.9	84.5	Q
11	Ao Yurikusa	24.9	9.7	24.5	0	25	84.1	Q
12	Yuta Kayotani	24.7	0	9.6	24.7	24.9	83.9	Q
13	Manato Kurashiki	25	0	9.2	24.8	24.6	83.6	Q
14	Keita Watabe	9.8	24.9	24.8	10	10	79.5	Q
15	Eito Tamiya	25	24.6	10	10	9.8	79.4	Q
16	Hiroto Shimizu	24.9	9.6	9.6	9.5	24.8	78.4	Q
17	Yoshiyuki Ogata	25	0	10	24.8	10	69.8	Q
18	Kokoro Fujii	9.9	0	10	24.8	25	69.7	Q
19	Yosui Sasahara	9.8	0	10	24.9	24.9	69.6	Q
19	Yuta Imaizumi	9.8	0	10	24.9	24.9	69.6	Q
21	Meichi Narasaki	9.8	24.8	9.8	0	25	69.4	Q
22	Daiki Sano	25	0	9.4	9.9	25	69.4	Q
23	Kento Yamaguchi	24.7	0	9.9	9.8	24.8	69.2	Q
23	Aki Shinozawa	9.9	0	9.9	24.5	24.9	69.2	Q
25	Sohta Amagasa	9.8	0	9.4	24.8	25	69	
26	Rei Sasaki	10	0	9.2	24.8	24.9	68.9	
27	Mahiro Takami	24.9	9.7	9.9	9.8	10	64.3	
28	Ema Kurita	24.9	0	9.8	24.9	0	59.6	
28	Kaede Fujita	25	0	9.6	0	25	59.6	
30	Hayato Tsuru	24.7	0	9.4	0	24.9	59	
31	Airu Kanbara	9.7	0	9.7	10	25	54.4	
32	Ryoei Nukui	9.8	24.8	9.6	9.9	0	54.1	
33	Ryusei Hamada	24.6	9.8	0	9.7	9.8	53.9	
33	Shion Omata	10	0	9.6	9.6	24.7	53.9	
35	Soran Koyama	25	0	0	9.8	10	44.8	
36	Genbu Uehara	9.9	24.8	0	9.9	0	44.6	
37	Takata Tomoaki	9.9	9.5	0	0	24.8	44.2	
38	Akira Tsunoda	9.5	9.4	9	0	9.5	37.4	
39	Ryota Toda	24.7	0	0	9.9	0	34.6	
40	Hayato Nakamura	9.9	0	9.9	10	0	29.8	
41	Satoki Tanaka	9.9	0	0	9.9	9.8	29.6	
41	Reo Matsuoka	10	0	0	9.6	10	29.6	
43	Haruto Imai	9.9	9.9	9.6	0	0	29.4	
44	Shoya Arakawa	0	0	24.3	0	0	24.3	
45	Haruyoshi Morimoto	10	0	0	10	0	20	
45	Yuuki Hoshi	10	0	0	0	10	20	
47	Zenta Bansho	9.7	0	0	9.9	0	19.6	
48	Masaki Saito	10	0	9.5	0	0	19.5	
49	Hareru Nagamori	9.9	0	0	0	0	9.9	
50	Shintaro Takeshita	9.7	0	0	0	0	9.7	

=== Women ===
The women's bouldering qualifications took place on 31 January 2026.

Rank	Athlete	Boulder					Total	Notes
Rank	Athlete	1	2	3	4	5	Total	Notes
1	Anon Matsufuji	25	25	25	25	25	125	Q
1	Futaba Ito	25	25	25	25	25	125	Q
1	Nanako Kura	25	25	25	25	25	125	Q
4	Mao Nakamura	25	25	24.9	25	25	124.9	Q
4	Miho Nonaka	25	24.9	25	25	25	124.9	Q
4	Ai Mori	25	25	24.9	25	25	124.9	Q
4	Mia Aoyagi	25	25	24.9	25	25	124.9	Q
8	Melody Sekikawa	25	25	25	25	24.8	124.8	Q
9	Yuno Harigae	25	24.9	24.8	25	25	124.7	Q
10	Sora Ito	25	24.8	24.9	25	24.9	124.6	Q
10	Yuno Tokutake	25	24.9	24.7	25	25	124.6	Q
12	Momoka Kaneko	24.9	25	24.7	25	24.9	124.5	Q
13	Miku Ishii	25	24.9	24.6	24.9	25	124.4	Q
14	Yui Suezawa	25	25	24.4	25	24.9	124.3	Q
15	Moka Mochizuki	25	25	24.9	25	10	109.9	Q
16	Nanami Nobe	25	25	24.7	25	10	109.7	Q
17	Serika Okawachi	24.9	24.9	9.9	25	24.9	109.6	Q
17	Chihiro Kaneko	25	24.9	24.8	10	24.9	109.6	Q
19	Kaho Murakoshi	25	24.8	24.7	25	10	109.5	Q
19	Nagi Karino	24.9	25	9.8	25	24.8	109.5	Q
19	Akane Matsuura	25	25	9.6	25	24.9	109.5	Q
19	Kohana Mugishima	25	25	9.8	25	24.7	109.5	Q
23	Manami Yama	25	24.9	24.8	25	9.7	109.4	Q
24	Ai Takeuchi	24.9	24.8	24.6	9.9	24.9	109.1	Q
24	Ren Koyamatsu	24.9	24.9	24.5	24.8	10	109.1	Q
26	Natsumi Oda	25	24.9	9.8	25	10	94.7	
27	Souka Hasegawa	25	24.8	24.7	10	10	94.5	
28	Towako Nakata	25	24.7	9.8	9.7	25	94.2	
29	Ayaka Kaji	24.8	24.7	9.7	9.9	25	94.1	
30	Kiki Matsuda	25	24.8	9.1	25	10	93.9	
31	Iroha Yamazaki	25	24.8	8.9	25	10	93.7	
32	Ryo Nakajima	25	24.8	9.9	0	25	84.7	
33	Hina Sato	25	25	10	10	10	80	
34	Sakura Okuzaki	24.9	25	9.7	10	10	79.6	
35	Mio Nukui	10	24.7	24.9	10	9.8	79.4	
36	Sarii Saito	25	9.8	10	9.7	24.8	79.3	
37	Tsukushi Yamauchi	25	24.6	9.4	10	10	79	
38	Mia Nishikawa	25	9.8	10	10	10	64.8	
39	Mitsu Yamada	24.9	10	9.8	10	10	64.7	
40	Rin Ninomiya	24.8	10	9.8	10	10	64.6	
41	Chihiro Saito	9.7	24.9	9.5	10	10	64.1	
41	Serina Koyama	10	24.6	10	9.6	9.9	64.1	
43	Komi Yamatani	9.9	24.8	9.3	10	9.7	63.7	
44	Misa Inoue	9.9	24.9	9.9	9.9	0	54.6	
45	Koko Masuda	10	24.8	9.3	10	0	54.1	
45	Hanaha Takahashi	10	24.7	9.4	10	0	54.1	
47	Kinoshita Mei	10	9.8	9.3	9.9	10	49	
48	Hisana Kuya	10	10	0	0	0	20	
48	Neo Onishi	10	10	0	0	0	20	
50	Yuka Higuchi	0	10	0	0	9.7	19.7	
