= Camilla Moroni =

Italian rock climber

Personal information
- Nationality: Italy
- Born: 7 August 2001 (age 25) Mignanego, Italy
- Occupation: Professional rock climber
- Height: 1.58 m (5 ft 2 in)

Climbing career
- Type of climber: Competition climbing; Bouldering; Sport climbing; Big wall climbing
- Highest grade: Redpoint: 8b+ (5.14a); Bouldering: 8B+ (V14)
Medal record
Women's competition climbing
Representing Italy
World Championships
Silver medal – second place	2021 Moscow	Bouldering
World Cup
Silver medal – second place	Keqiao 2024	Bouldering
Bronze medal – third place	Curitiba 2025	Bouldering
European Championships
Bronze medal – third place	2026 Barcelona	Bouldering

Camilla Moroni (born 7 August 2001) is an Italian rock climber. She competed in the 2024 Olympics in the Women's combined event. Moroni won the silver medal in the women's competition bouldering event at the 2021 IFSC Climbing World Championships. In 2025, with her climbing partner Pietro Vidi, she free climbed the 35-pitch big wall climbing route, Pre-Muir Wall (grade 5.13c/d), on El Capitan in Yosemite National Park. In 2025, she made the first female free ascent of the 8b+ (5.14a) graded multi-pitch climbing route, Histoire sans fin, on Mont Blanc.
