= Sorato Anraku =

Japanese competition climber (born 2006)

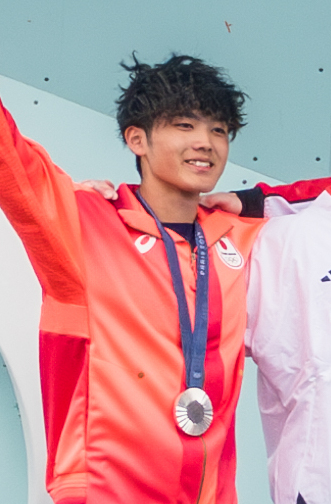
- Anraku at the 2024 Summer Olympics

Personal information
- Nationality: Japanese
- Born: November 14, 2006 (age 20) Yachiyo, Chiba, Japan
- Education: Yachiyo High School
- Height: 168 cm (5 ft 6 in)

Climbing career
- Type of climber: Competition lead climbing; Competition bouldering
- Ape index: +13 cm (5 in)
- Known for: First male to win both the overall bouldering and lead IFSC World Cup titles in the same season. Did so in his debut season.
Medal record
Event / 1st / 2nd / 3rd; World Cup / 17 / 5 / 4
Men's competition climbing
Representing Japan
Olympic Games
Silver medal – second place	2024 Paris	Combined
World Championships
Gold medal – first place	2025 Seoul	Bouldering
Silver medal – second place	2023 Bern	Lead
World Cup (Overall)
Winner	2023	Bouldering
Winner	2023	Lead
Winner	2024	Bouldering
Winner	2025	Bouldering
Winner	2026	Bouldering
Second place	2025	Lead
Third place	2024	Lead
World Cup (Event)
Gold medal – first place	Innsbruck 2026	Bouldering
Gold medal – first place	Prague 2026	Bouldering
Gold medal – first place	Madrid 2026	Bouldering
Gold medal – first place	Bern 2026	Bouldering
Gold medal – first place	Keqiao 2026	Bouldering
Gold medal – first place	Koper 2025	Lead
Gold medal – first place	Chamonix 2025	Lead
Gold medal – first place	Salt Lake City 2025	Bouldering
Gold medal – first place	Curitiba 2025	Bouldering
Gold medal – first place	Wujiang 2025	Lead
Gold medal – first place	Keqiao 2025	Bouldering
Gold medal – first place	Seoul 2024	Lead
Gold medal – first place	Salt Lake City 2024	Bouldering
Gold medal – first place	Wujiang 2023	Lead
Gold medal – first place	Koper 2023	Lead
Gold medal – first place	Briançon 2023	Lead
Gold medal – first place	Innsbruck 2023	Bouldering
Silver medal – second place	Innsbruck 2025	Bouldering
Silver medal – second place	Prague 2025	Bouldering
Silver medal – second place	Koper 2024	Lead
Silver medal – second place	Keqiao 2024	Bouldering
Silver medal – second place	Salt Lake City 2023	Bouldering
Bronze medal – third place	Bern 2025	Bouldering
Bronze medal – third place	Innsbruck 2024	Bouldering
Bronze medal – third place	Wujiang 2024	Lead
Bronze medal – third place	Chamonix 2023	Lead
Asian Championships
Gold medal – first place	2024	Bouldering
Silver medal – second place	2026	Lead
Asian Games
Gold medal – first place	2022 Hangzhou	Combined
Gold medal – first place	2026 Aichi-Nagoya	Boulder

Sorato Anraku (安楽 宙斗, Anraku Sorato, born November 14, 2006) is a Japanese rock climber who specializes in competition lead climbing and competition bouldering. In 2023, Anraku became the first climber to win both the Lead Overall World Cup and Boulder Overall World Cup, doing so in his debut senior season. He also won the gold medal in the combined boulder and lead event at the 2022 Asian Games, held in October 2023. He won the silver medal in the combined boulder and lead event at the 2024 Summer Olympics.

== Climbing career ==
Before 2023, Anraku competed in youth international competition climbing.

=== 2023: Four World Cup wins, World Championship Silver, Overall titles in Boulder and Lead ===
In 2023, Anraku made his senior international competition climbing debut, opening the year with a fifth-place finish in bouldering at the IFSC Climbing World Cup in Hachioji. He went on to win his first World Cup medal by placing second in the bouldering discipline at the Salt Lake City World Cup in May. This was followed by his first World Cup gold medal at the Innsbruck World Cup in June, where he was also awarded the overall title for the 2023 Bouldering World Cup season.

He went on to claim his first World Cup medal in lead climbing with a bronze in Chamonix in July, followed by his first gold medal in lead at the Briançon World Cup later in July. At the 2023 IFSC Climbing World Championships in Bern in August, he won a silver medal in lead behind Jakob Schubert. He followed this up with two more first-place finishes at the Koper and Wujiang World Cups, both in September, following which he was also awarded the overall title for the 2023 Lead World Cup season. In October, shortly after his performance in Wujiang, he also won gold in the men's combined sport climbing event at the 2022 Asian Games in Hangzhou, in his Asian Games debut. He participated in the 2023 Asian Sport Climbing Olympic Qualifier, held in Jakarta in November, where he placed first in the men's boulder and lead competition. This qualified him for the 2024 Summer Olympics in Paris.

=== 2024: Olympic Silver and two World Cup wins ===
Anraku began the year at the Keqiao Boulder World Cup, where he reached the finals and placed second behind Tomoa Narasaki. At the Salt Lake City World Cup, Anraku reached the final and claimed his second Boulder World Cup gold ahead of Meichi Narasaki and Jakob Schubert. At the 2024 Summer Olympics, he earned a silver medal, becoming the first Japanese male climber to medal in Sport Climbing at the Games. Anraku rounded off the season by winning the Lead World Cup in Seoul in October.

=== 2025: World Championship title and six World Cup wins ===
Anraku began the season by achieving an unprecedented feat in men's bouldering, securing three consecutive Boulder World Cup victories. Never finishing off the podium, he clinched the 2025 Boulder World Cup overall title — marking his third consecutive overall triumph in the discipline. The 2025 Lead season saw Anraku secure gold in three of the six Lead World Cups. Over the full lead season, he finished 2nd in the 2025 Lead World Cup overall standings. At the 2025 IFSC Climbing World Championships in Seoul, Anraku captured the men's Boulder World Championship title.

=== 2026: Record-breaking five consecutive Boulder World Climbing Series wins ===
Anraku began his 2026 Boulder season in Keqiao. He produced a dominant performance in the finals to win ahead of rivals Lee Do-hyun and Mejdi Schalck. In May, Anraku won the Bern Boulder World Climbing Series. This was Anraku's first win in Bern. He had previously missed the boulder podium at the 2023 IFSC Climbing World Championships and placed third at the 2025 Bern World Cup.

In Madrid, Anraku overcame a near finals miss and held off a resurgent Colin Duffy to take the win by flashing the final boulder problem. Anraku won his fourth-consecutive Boulder World Climbing Series of the season in Prague. Anraku then won his fifth-consecutive boulder World Climbing Series in Innsbruck. He became the first man to win five straight boulder World Cups in the same season.

At the 2026 Asian Games, Anraku won the gold medal in the boulder event.

== Rankings ==
=== World Cup ===
Discipline	2023	2024	2025	2026
Lead	1	3	2	5
Bouldering	1	1	1	1
Bouldering & Lead	1	2	-	-

=== World Championships ===
Discipline	Bern 2023	Seoul 2025
Lead	2	10
Bouldering	4	1
Bouldering & Lead	4	-

=== World Youth Championships ===
Discipline	2021 Youth B	2022 Youth A
Bouldering	2	3
Lead	1	1

=== Japan Cup ===
Discipline	2019	2022	2023	2024	2025	2026
Lead	60	9	7	12	1	3
Bouldering	67	33	7	6	1	3
Bouldering & Lead	-	1	1	-	-	-

== Number of medals at the IFSC Climbing World Cup ==
=== Bouldering ===
Season	Gold	Silver	Bronze	Total
2023	1	1		2
2024	1	1	1	3
2025	3	2	1	6
2026	5			5
Total	10	4	2	16

=== Lead ===
Season	Gold	Silver	Bronze	Total
2023	3		1	4
2024	1	1	1	3
2025	3			3
Total	7	1	2	10

== See also ==
- Yuji Hirayama
- Rankings of most career IFSC gold medals
