= 2024 IFSC Climbing World Cup =

Sport climbing competition series

- Organiser: IFSC
- Edition: 36th
- Events: 16: 5 Boulder 6 Lead 5 Speed
- Locations: 9: Keqiao (B) Wujiang (L, S) Salt Lake City (B, S) Innsbruck (B, L) Chamonix (L, S) Briançon (L, S) Koper (L) Prague (B) Seoul (B, L, S)
- Dates: 8 April – 6 October 2024

Lead
- Men: (United Kingdom) Toby Roberts
- Women: (Austria) Jessica Pilz
- Team: Japan

Boulder
- Men: (Japan) Sorato Anraku
- Women: (United States) Natalia Grossman
- Team: Japan

Speed
- Men: (United States) Samuel Watson
- Women: (China) Lijuan Deng
- Team: China

The 2024 IFSC Climbing World Cup is the 36th edition of the international competition climbing series organised by the International Federation of Sport Climbing (IFSC), held in 9 locations. There are 16 events per gender: five competition bouldering, six competition lead climbing, and five competition speed climbing events. The series began on 8 April in Keqiao, Shaoxing, China, with the first bouldering World Cup of the season, and concluded on 8 October in Seoul with bouldering, lead, and speed.

== Scheduling ==
In October 2023, IFSC announced the 2024 competition schedule, with the season-opening event held in China for the first time with the Shanghai World Cup from 9 to 10 April (later moved to the Keqiao district of Shaoxing).

The schedule includes two breaks to accommodate the 2024 Paris Olympics in July. The competition pauses for seven weeks after the Salt Lake City World Cup in May for the 2024 Olympic Qualifier Series events in Shanghai from 16 to 19 May and Budapest from 20 to 23 June, when the final Olympic places in sport climbing are awarded. The series resumes in on 26 June for the Innsbruck World Cup, which is followed by the two French World Cups in Briançon and Chamonix World Cup concluding on 19 July, a week before the opening of the Olympic Games on 26 July. The competition resumes again on 6 September at the Koper World Cup.

The season ends with the Seoul World Cup from 2 to 6 October, with all three competition climbing disciplines—bouldering, lead, and speed—included featured. This would mark the first time that season trophies for all six events—three disciplines per gender—are awarded at the same event.

== Competition format and ranking ==
The top three finishers in each individual competition receive medals, and the overall winners are awarded trophies. At the end of the season, an overall ranking is determined based upon points, which athletes are awarded for finishing in the top 40 of each individual event.

== Overview ==
No.	Location	D	G	Gold		Silver		Bronze	
1	(China) Keqiao; 8–10 April (Note: Keqiao men's bouldering results based on semifinal standings after qualifiers were delayed due to heavy rainfall.)	B	M	(Japan) Tomoa Narasaki	2T4z 2 4	(Japan) Sorato Anraku	2T4z 4 8	(Belgium) Hannes Van Duysen	2T3z 4 4
1	(China) Keqiao; 8–10 April	B	W	(Slovenia) Janja Garnbret	4T4z 5 5	(Italy) Camilla Moroni	2T3z 10 13	(China) Luo Zhilu	2T2z 2 2
2	(China) Wujiang; 12–14 April	L	M	(United Kingdom) Toby Roberts	36+	(Japan) Taisei Homma	36+	(Japan) Sorato Anraku	32+
2	(China) Wujiang; 12–14 April	L	W	(Slovenia) Janja Garnbret	TOP	(China) Luo Zhilu	44+	(South Korea) Chaehyun Seo	43+
2	(China) Wujiang; 12–14 April	S	M	(China) Wu Peng	4.91	(United States) Samuel Watson	5.11	(Indonesia) Kiromal Katibin	5.07
2	(China) Wujiang; 12–14 April	S	W	(Poland) Aleksandra Miroslaw	6.24	(Poland) Natalia Kałucka	6.75	(South Korea) Jimin Jeong	6.62
3	(United States) Salt Lake City; 3–5 May	B	M	(Japan) Sorato Anraku	3T4z 11 11	(Japan) Meichi Narasaki	1T4z 1 13	(Austria) Jakob Schubert	1T4z 7 9
3	(United States) Salt Lake City; 3–5 May	B	W	(United States) Natalia Grossman	3T4z 3 10	(France) Oriane Bertone	3T4z 6 6	(France) Naïlé Meignan	3T4z 6 13
3	(United States) Salt Lake City; 3–5 May	S	M	(United States) Samuel Watson	4.89	(United States) Noah Bratschi	6.71	(Austria) Kevin Amon	5.48
3	(United States) Salt Lake City; 3–5 May	S	W	(United States) Emma Hunt	6.55	(Poland) Aleksandra Kałucka	FALL	(China) Lijuan Deng	6.94
4	(Austria) Innsbruck; 26–30 June	B	M	(Japan) Sohta Amagasa	3T3z 8 7	(Japan) Meichi Narasaki	3T3z 11 7	(Japan) Sorato Anraku	2T3z 2 3
4	(Austria) Innsbruck; 26–30 June	B	W	(Slovenia) Janja Garnbret	4T4z 10 9	(Slovenia) Jennifer Eucharia Buckley	3T3z 11 8	(United States) Anastasia Sanders	3T3z 12 9
4	(Austria) Innsbruck; 26–30 June	L	M	(Austria) Jakob Schubert	45	(Germany) Alexander Megos	42+	(United Kingdom) Toby Roberts	41+
4	(Austria) Innsbruck; 26–30 June	L	W	(Slovenia) Janja Garnbret	TOP	(Japan) Ai Mori	TOP	(South Korea) Chaehyun Seo	36
5	(France) Chamonix; 12–14 July	L	M	(United States) Colin Duffy	42+	(France) Sam Avezou	41+	(United Kingdom) Toby Roberts	39
5	(France) Chamonix; 12–14 July	L	W	(Japan) Ai Mori	TOP	(Austria) Jessica Pilz	TOP	(Japan) Mei Kotake	44+
5	(France) Chamonix; 12–14 July	S	M	(United States) Samuel Watson	6.24	(China) Xinshang Wang	7.76	(Spain) Erik Noya Cardona	5.05
5	(France) Chamonix; 12–14 July	S	W	(China) Shaoqin Zhang	6.60	(Poland) Natalia Kałucka	FALL	(South Korea) Jimin Jeong	6.64
6	(France) Briançon; 17–19 July	L	M	(Japan) Zento Murashita	47+	(Japan) Satone Yoshida	45	(Japan) Shion Omata	42+
6	(France) Briançon; 17–19 July	L	W	(Japan) Mei Kotake	49+	(Italy) Laura Rogora	45	(Austria) Mattea Pötzi	42+
6	(France) Briançon; 17–19 July	S	M	(Italy) Ludovico Fossali	4.97	(Spain) Erik Noya Cardona	5.06	(China) Jianguo Long	4.93
6	(France) Briançon; 17–19 July	S	W	(China) Lijuan Deng	6.41	(South Korea) Jimin Jeong	6.53	(China) Shaoqin Zhang	6.46
7	(Slovenia) Koper; 6–7 September	L	M	(United Kingdom) Toby Roberts	40	(Japan) Sorato Anraku	35	(France) Sam Avezou	31+
7	(Slovenia) Koper; 6–7 September	L	W	(Slovenia) Janja Garnbret	46+	(Austria) Jessica Pilz	40+	(United States) Anastasia Sanders	39+
8	(Czech Republic) Prague; 20–22 Sept	B	M	(South Korea) Lee Dohyun	2T4z 3 19	(France) Manuel Cornu	2T3z 5 10	(United Kingdom) Toby Roberts	2T2z 6 2
8	(Czech Republic) Prague; 20–22 Sept	B	W	(United States) Natalia Grossman	3T4z 17 18	(France) Naïlé Meignan	2T4z 8 11	(Australia) Oceana Mackenzie	2T3z 8 6
9	(South Korea) Seoul; 2–6 Oct								
9	(South Korea) Seoul; 2–6 Oct	B	M	(South Korea) Lee Dohyun	2T4z 4 4	(United Kingdom) Maximillian Milne	2T4z 4 5	(Japan) Sohta Amagasa	0T4z 0 7
9	(South Korea) Seoul; 2–6 Oct	B	W	(United States) Anastasia Sanders	3T4z 7 13	(France) Zélia Avezou	3T4z 9 7	(United Kingdom) Erin McNeice	2T4z 4 5
9	(South Korea) Seoul; 2–6 Oct	L	M	(Japan) Sorato Anraku	45+	(South Korea) Lee Dohyun	45+	(Japan) Shion Omata	35
9	(South Korea) Seoul; 2–6 Oct	L	W	(Austria) Jessica Pilz	48	(Japan) Ai Mori	46	(United States) Anastasia Sanders	45
9	(South Korea) Seoul; 2–6 Oct	S	M	(China) Xinshang Wang	6.23	(Kazakhstan) Amir Maimuratov	10.60	(Indonesia) Kiromal Katibin	4.99
9	(South Korea) Seoul; 2–6 Oct	S	W	(China) Yafei Zhou	6.78	(Indonesia) Rajiah Sallsabillah	8.08	(China) Shengyan Wang	6.80

== Bouldering ==
The overall ranking is determined based upon points, which athletes are awarded for finishing in the top 80 of each individual event. The end-of-season standings are based on the sum of points earned from the five best finishes for each athlete. Results displayed (in brackets) are not counted. The national ranking is the sum of the points of that country's three best male and female athletes.

=== Men ===
The results of the ten most successful athletes of the Bouldering World Cup 2024:

Rank	Name	Points	Keqiao	Salt Lake City	Innsbruck	Prague	Seoul
1	(Japan) Sorato Anraku	3365	2. 805	1. 1000	3. 690	4. 610	14. 260
2	(Japan) Meichi Narasaki	2860	6. 495	2. 805	2. 805	14. 260	6. 495
3	(Japan) Tomoa Narasaki	2690	1. 1000	9. 380	8. 415	5. 545	10. 350
4	(Japan) Sohta Amagasa	2416	29. 52	4. 610	1. 1000	27. 64	3. 690
5	(United Kingdom) Toby Roberts	2365	4. 610	7. 455	4. 610	3. 690	-
6	(South Korea) Lee Dohyun	2280	13. 280	-	-	1. 1000	1. 1000
7	(United Kingdom) Maximillian Milne	1571.66	9. 351.66	-	-	8. 415	2. 805
8	(Japan) Ritsu Kayotani	1375	16. 220	-	6. 495	13. 280	9. 380
9	(South Korea) Jongwon Chon	1331.5	7. 455	-	33. 31.5	12. 300	5. 545
10	(France) Manuel Cornu	1323.5	31. 39.5	11. 312.5	43. 11.5	2. 805	20. 155

=== Women ===
The results of the ten most successful athletes of the Bouldering World Cup 2024:

Rank	Name	Points	Keqiao	Salt Lake City	Innsbruck	Prague	Seoul
1	(United States) Natalia Grossman	2610	-	1. 1000	-	1. 1000	4. 610
2	(Australia) Oceana Mackenzie	2405	10. 350	4. 610	12. 300	3. 690	7. 455
3	(Japan) Mao Nakamura	2262.5	11. 312.5*	6. 495	4. 610	6. 495	10. 350
4	(United States) Anastasia Sanders	2105	-	8. 415	3. 690	-	1. 1000
5	(Slovenia) Janja Garnbret	2000	1. 1000	-	1. 1000	-	-
6	(France) Zélia Avezou	1960	4. 610	-	-	5. 545	2. 805
7	(France) Naïlé Meignan	1875	-	3. 690	9. 380	2. 805	-
8	(Japan) Anon Matsufuji	1848	6. 495	10. 350	27. 68*	4. 610	11. 325
9	(United Kingdom) Erin McNeice	1572.5	5. 545	-	-	10. 337.5	3. 690
10	(France) Oriane Bertone	1260	-	2. 805	7. 455	-	-

* = Joint place with another athlete

== Lead ==
The overall ranking is determined based upon points, which athletes are awarded for finishing in the top 80 of each individual event. The end-of-season standings are based on the sum of points earned from the five best finishes for each athlete. Results displayed (in brackets) are not counted. The national ranking is the sum of the points of that country's three best male and female athletes.

=== Men ===
The results of the ten most successful athletes of the Lead World Cup 2024:

Rank	Name	Points	Wujiang	Innsbruck	Chamonix	Briançon	Koper	Seoul
1	(United Kingdom) Toby Roberts	3380	1. 1000	3. 690	3. 690	-	1. 1000	-
2	(Japan) Shion Omata	2915	9. 380	16. (220)	5. 545	3. 690	4. 610	3. 690
3	(Japan) Sorato Anraku	2845	3. 690	10. 350	-	-	2. 805	1. 1000
4	(Japan) Zento Murashita	2665	4. 610	11. 325	9. 380	1. 1000	10. 350	11. (325)
5	(France) Sam Avezou	2330	12. 290	-	2. 805	-	3. 690	5. 545
6	(Japan) Taisei Homma	2140	2. 805	6. 495	17. 205	16. 220	25. (95)	8. 415
7	(Japan) Satone Yoshida	2080	11. 325	12. 300	12. 300	2. 805	20. (155)	10. 350
8	(Switzerland) Sascha Lehmann	2040	5. 545	9. 380	7. 455	-	9. 380	13. 280
9	(Japan) Shuta Tanaka	1960	7. 455	5. 545	31. (42)	7. 455	17. 205	12. 300
10	(United States) Colin Duffy	1765	20. 155	4. 610	1. 1000	-	-	-

=== Women ===
The results of the ten most successful athletes of the Lead World Cup 2024:

Rank	Name	Points	Wujiang	Innsbruck	Chamonix	Briançon	Koper	Seoul
1	(Austria) Jessica Pilz	3220	-	4. 610	2. 805	-	2. 805	1. 1000
2	(Slovenia) Janja Garnbret	3000	1. 1000	1. 1000	-	-	1. 1000	-
3	(Japan) Ai Mori	2610	-	2. 805	1. 1000	-	-	2. 805
4	(South Korea) Seo Chae-hyun	2370	3. 690	3. 690	-	-	9. 380	4. 610
5	(Japan) Mei Kotake	2355	-	16. 220	3. 690	1. 1000	25. 95	10. 350
6	(United States) Anastasia Sanders	2330	-	6. 495	7. 455	-	3. 690	3. 690
7	(Austria) Mattea Pötzi	2315	20. 155	7. 455	6. 495	3. 690	7. 455	16. 220
8	(Italy) Laura Rogora	2235	6. 495	15. 240	-	2. 805	8. 415	13. 280
9	(France) Zelia Avezou	1625	12. 300	-	4. 610	-	5. 545	19. 170
10	(Slovenia) Mia Krampl	1600	8. 415	17. 205	8. 415	-	11. 325	15. 240

* = Joint place with another athlete

== Season podium table ==
Rank	Nation	Gold	Silver	Bronze	Total
1	United States (USA)	2	0	0	2
2	Japan (JPN)	1	2	4	7
3	China (CHN)	1	0	1	2
4	Austria (AUT)	1	0	0	1
4	Great Britain (GBR)	1	0	0	1
6	Australia (AUS)	0	1	0	1
6	Italy (ITA)	0	1	0	1
6	Poland (POL)	0	1	0	1
6	Slovenia (SLO)	0	1	0	1
10	South Korea (KOR)	0	0	1	1
Totals (10 entries)		6	6	6	18

== Medal table ==
Rank	Nation	Gold	Silver	Bronze	Total
1	Japan (JPN)	7	8	6	21
2	United States (USA)	7	2	3	12
3	China (CHN)	5	2	5	12
4	Slovenia (SLO)	5	1	0	6
5	South Korea (KOR)	2	2	4	8
6	Austria (AUT)	2	2	3	7
7	Great Britain (GBR)	2	1	4	7
8	Poland (POL)	1	3	0	4
9	Italy (ITA)	1	2	0	3
10	France (FRA)	0	5	2	7
11	Indonesia (INA)	0	1	2	3
12	Spain (ESP)	0	1	1	2
13	Germany (GER)	0	1	0	1
13	Kazakhstan (KAZ)	0	1	0	1
15	Australia (AUS)	0	0	1	1
15	Belgium (BEL)	0	0	1	1
Totals (16 entries)		32	32	32	96

== See also ==
- Sport climbing at the 2024 Summer Olympics
