= Sohta Amagasa =

Japanese competition climber

Personal information
- Nationality: Japanese
- Born: June 14, 2000 (age 26) Kanagawa, Japan
- Education: Nihon University
- Occupation: Professional sport climber
- Height: 172 cm (5 ft 8 in)

Climbing career
- Type of climber: Competition bouldering
Medal record
Event / 1st / 2nd / 3rd; World Cup / 1 / 1 / 1
Men's competition climbing
Representing Japan
World Cup (Overall)
Third place	2025	Bouldering
World Cup (Event)
Gold medal – first place	Innsbruck 2024	Bouldering
Silver medal – second place	Salt Lake City 2025	Bouldering
Bronze medal – third place	Seoul 2024	Bouldering
Asian Championships
Silver medal – second place	2024	Bouldering
- Updated on May 26, 2025

Sohta Amagasa (天笠 颯太, Amagasa Sōta, born June 14, 2000) is a Japanese professional rock climber, specializing in competition climbing.

== Climbing career ==
Before 2021, Amagasa competed on the international youth competition climbing circuit. In 2019, he won the IFSC Youth World Championships bouldering and combined junior titles, and placed second in lead.

In 2021, Amagasa reached the bouldering final in his debut IFSC World Cup in Meiringen, placing sixth out of the 100 competitors at this event.

At the 2024 IFSC Climbing World Cup in Innsbruck, he won his first gold medal in bouldering, followed by a bronze medal in bouldering at the Seoul World Cup later in October.

In 2025, Amagasa won the silver medal at the Bouldering World Cup in Salt Lake City. Never placing lower than 9th all season, Amagasa went on to claim 3rd place in the overall Bouldering World Cup standings.

== Rankings ==
=== World Cup ===
Discipline	2021	2024	2025	2026
Bouldering	11	4	3	7

=== Youth World Championships ===
Discipline	2019
Lead (Juniors)	2
Bouldering (Juniors)	1
Combined	1

=== Japan Cup ===
Discipline	2018	2019	2020	2021	2022	2023	2024	2025	2026
Bouldering	65	16	26	4	25	23	7	12	25
