= Zélia Avezou =

French rock climber (born 2004)

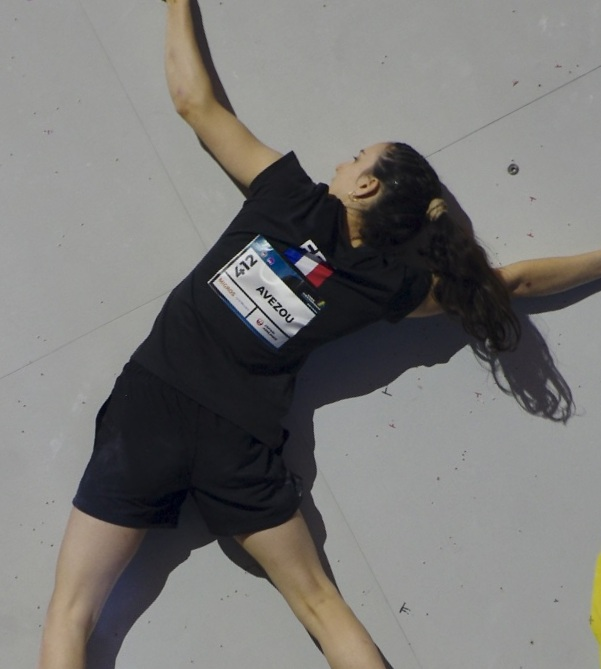
- Avezou in 2023

Personal information
- Born: 10 April 2004 (age 22)
- Relative: Sam Avezou (brother)

Sport
- Sport: Competition climbing
Medal record
Women's competition climbing
Representing France
European Games
Gold medal – first place	2023 Kraków–Małopolska	Bouldering
World Cup
Gold medal – first place	2026 Keqiao	Bouldering
Silver medal – second place	2024 Seoul	Bouldering
Silver medal – second place	2025 Salt Lake City	Bouldering
Bronze medal – third place	2026 Prague	Lead
European Championships
Silver medal – second place	2026 Barcelona	Bouldering
Bronze medal – third place	2024 Villars	Combined

Zélia Avezou (born 10 April 2004) is a French competition climber. She competed at the 2023 European Games, winning the gold medal in the women's bouldering event. She also competed at the 2024 IFSC Climbing European Championships, winning the bronze medal in the women's combined event. Avezou competed in the 2024 Summer Olympics in Paris, France, placing 14th in the women's combined event.
