= Meichi Narasaki =

Japanese climber

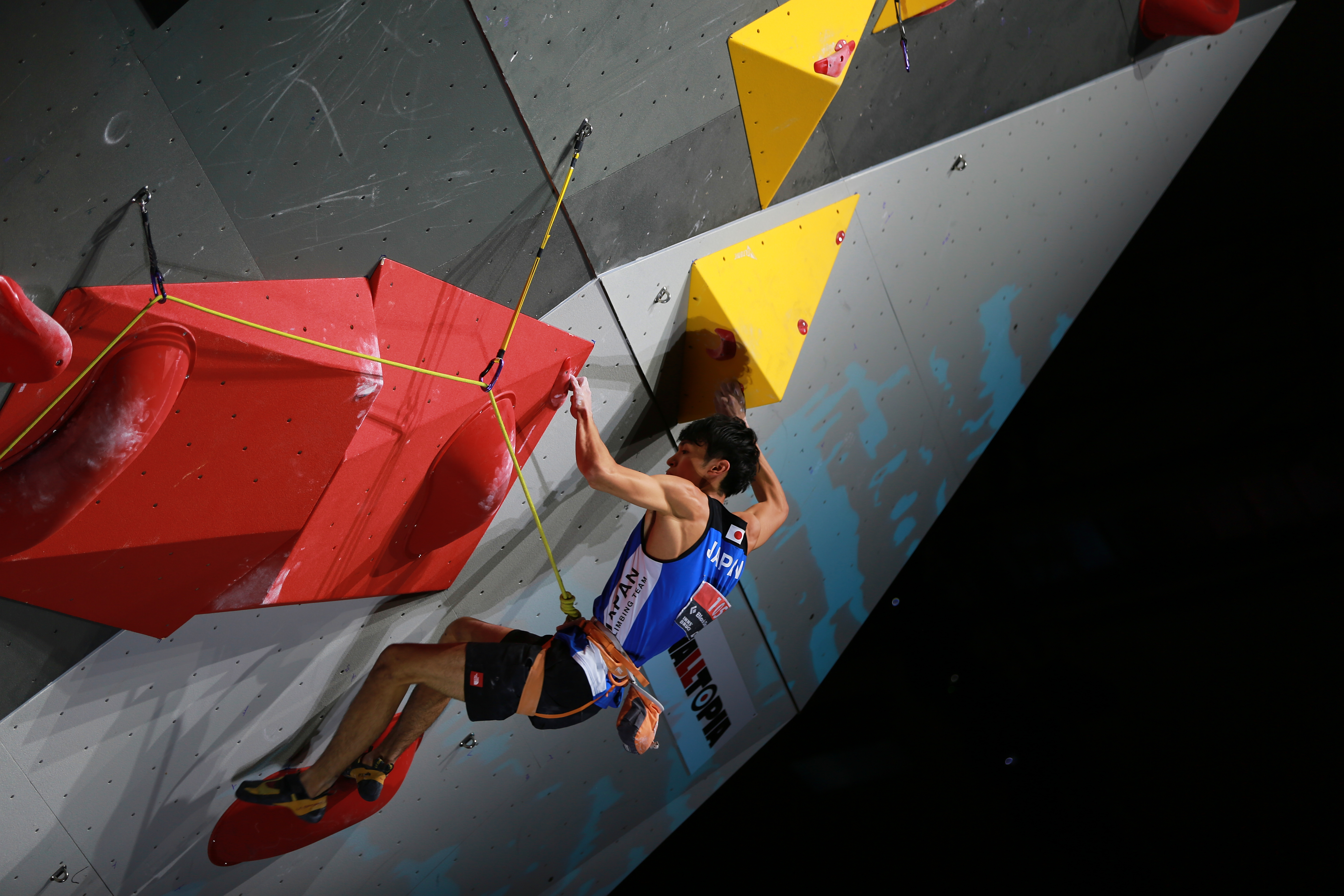
- Meichi Narasaki in Innsbruck, 2018

Personal information
- Nationality: Japanese
- Born: May 13, 1999 (age 27) Utsunomiya, Japan
- Occupation: Professional climber
- Height: 186 cm (6 ft 1 in)

Climbing career
- Type of climber: Competition climbing
- Known for: 2018 Asian Championships Combined and Bouldering Winner
Medal record
World Cup (Overall)
Second place	2024	Bouldering
World Cup (Event)
Silver medal – second place	Innsbruck 2024	Bouldering
Silver medal – second place	Salt Lake 2024	Bouldering
Silver medal – second place	Innsbruck 2023	Bouldering
Silver medal – second place	Vail 2017	Bouldering
Bronze medal – third place	Keqiao 2025	Bouldering
Asian Championships
Gold medal – first place	2018	Bouldering
Gold medal – first place	2018	Combined
- Updated on September 5, 2019

Meichi Narasaki (楢﨑 明智 Narasaki Meichi, born May 13, 1999) is a Japanese professional competition climber who specializes in competition bouldering. He has been active in professional competition climbing since 2013.

His older brother Tomoa Narasaki is also a professional competition climber.

== Climbing career ==
=== Competition climbing ===
Meichi Narasaki won the Japan Cup in bouldering in 2023 and 2026, along with many other top three finishes in the IFSC World Cups and IFSC World Championships.

=== Bouldering ===
Meichi's long wingspan and height allow him to perform climbs in a different style compared to his brother, Tomoa.

== Rankings ==
=== IFSC Climbing World Cup ===
Discipline	2016	2017	2018	2019	2022	2023	2024	2025	2026
Lead	32	61	-	12	-	41	-	-	-
Bouldering	63	11	33	28	19	9	2	9	26
Speed	-	-	-	55	-	-	-	-	-
Combined	10	29	11	-	-	-	-	-	-

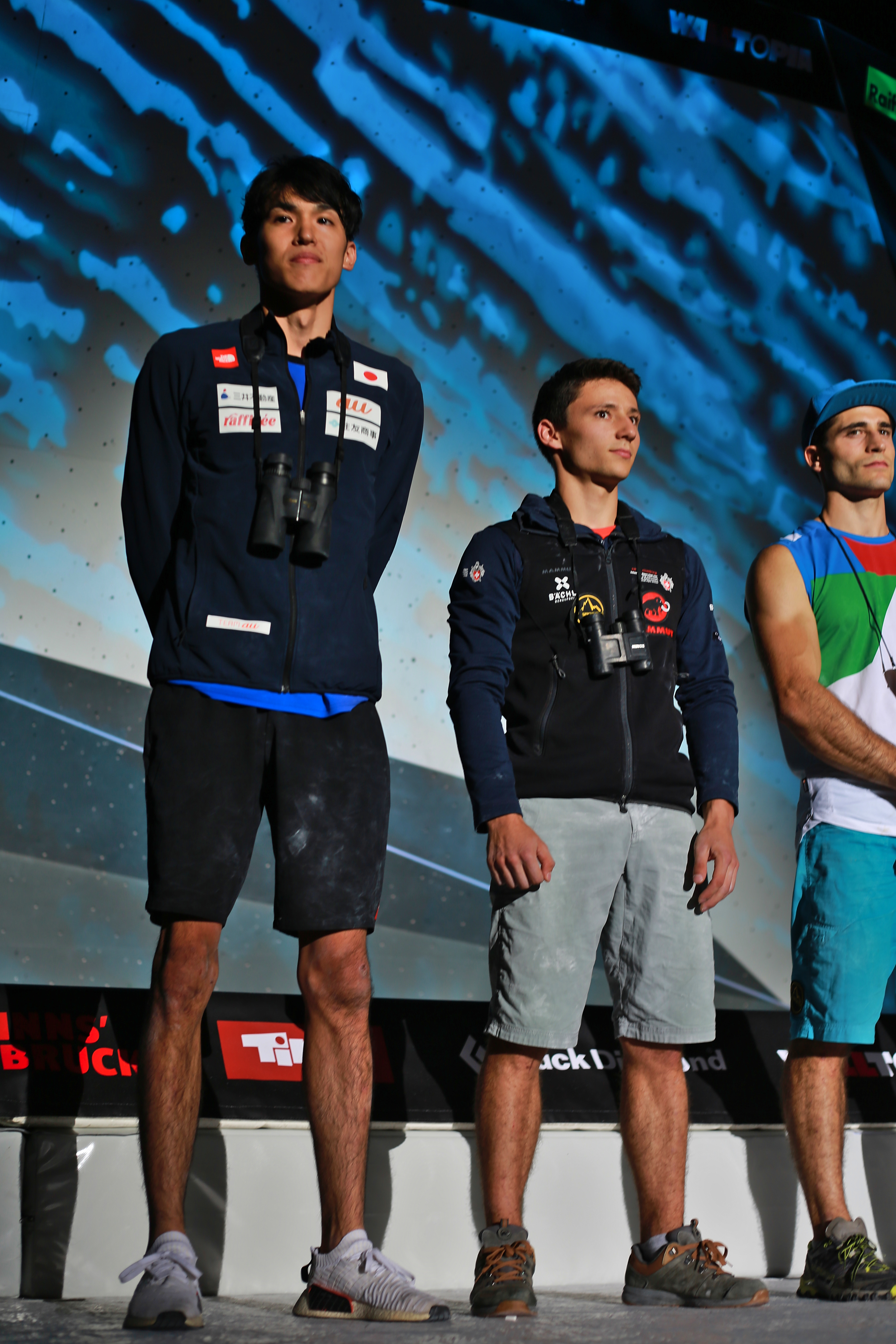
Meichi Narasaki, left, at the Climbing World Championships, 2018

=== Climbing World Championships ===
Discipline	2018	2019	2023	2025
Lead	4	12	31	-
Bouldering	37	13	14	5
Speed	42	38	-	-
Combined	8	5	16	-

=== Asian Championships ===
Discipline	2018
Lead	6
Bouldering	1
Speed	18
Combined	1

=== Youth World Championships ===
Discipline	2018
Lead (Juniors)	1
Bouldering (Juniors)	1
Speed	21

=== Japan Cup ===
Discipline	2014	2015	2016	2017	2018	2019	2020	2021	2022	2023	2024	2025	2026
Lead	11	21	44	13	-	4	15	10	16	12	-	-	-
Bouldering	23	29	18	5	-	8	12	12	9	1	4	33	1
Bouldering & Lead	-	-	-	-	-	-	-	19	6	9	-	-	-
Combined	-	-	-	-	2	6	-	-	-	-	-	-	-

== See also ==
- List of grade milestones in rock climbing
- History of rock climbing
- Rankings of most career IFSC gold medals
