= Lead Japan Cup 2022 =

Annual competition climbing event

- Venue: Matsuyamashita Park General Gymnasium
- Location: Inzai, Chiba, Japan
- Date: 12 – 13 February 2022
- Website: https://www.jma-climbing.org/competition/2022/ljc/

Medalists
gold medal	Taisei Homma / Ai Mori
silver medal	Satone Yoshida / Mei Kotake
bronze medal	Kokoro Fujii / Natsuki Tanii

The 2022 Lead Japan Cup was the 35th edition of the annual competition lead climbing event organised by the Japan Mountaineering and Sport Climbing Association (JMSCA), held in Matsuyamashita Park General Gymnasium, Inzai.

LJC is the sole selection event for Japan's national lead team. Athletes who place highly at the LJC are eligible to compete in the Lead World Cups, subject to JMSCA's prevailing selection criteria. LJC 2022 was the first domestic lead competition of the 2022 season. 51 men and 45 women competed, with Taisei Homma and Ai Mori winning the men's and women's titles respectively.

== Finals ==
=== Men ===
The men's lead finals took place on 13 February 2022.

Rank	Name	Final
1	Taisei Homma	38
2	Satone Yoshida	35+
3	Kokoro Fujii	35
4	Yoshiyuki Ogata	32
5	Ao Yurikusa	31+
6	Sohta Amagasa	24
7	Keiichiro Korenaga	21+
8	Hidemasa Nishida	21+

=== Women ===
The women's lead finals took place on 13 February 2022.

Rank	Name	Final
1	Ai Mori	TOP
2	Mei Kotake	36
3	Natsuki Tanii	33+
4	Risa Ota	33+
5	Miu Kakizaki	31+
6	Futaba Ito	31+
7	Ryu Nakagawa	29+
8	Momoko Abe	25

== Semifinals ==
=== Men ===
The men's lead semifinals took place on 13 February 2022.

Rank	Name	Semifinal	Notes
1	Taisei Homma	30+	Q
2	Yoshiyuki Ogata	29	Q
3	Kokoro Fujii	28	Q
4	Keiichiro Korenaga	24	Q
5	Ao Yurikusa	22+	Q
6	Sohta Amagasa	20+	Q
7	Hidemasa Nishida	20+	Q
8	Satone Yoshida	16+	Q
9	Sorato Anraku	16+	
10	Tomoaki Takata	16+	
11	Keita Dohi	16+	
12	Neo Suzuki	16+	
13	Ryoei Nukui	16+	
14	Kento Yamaguchi	16+	
15	Yuki Uemura	16+	
16	Meichi Narasaki	16+	
17	Shuta Tanaka	16+	
18	Isamu Kawabata	16+	
19	Zento Murashita	16+	
20	Hiroto Shimizu	16+	
21	Yuya Kitae	16+	
22	Taito Nakagami	16+	
23	Hitoshi Mineoi	16+	
24	Ritsu Kayotani	16+	
25	Rei Kawamata	16	
26	Yuji Fujiwaki	15+	

=== Women ===
The women's lead semifinals took place on 13 February 2022.

Rank	Name	Semifinal	Notes
1	Ai Mori	40+	Q
2	Natsuki Tanii	38+	Q
3	Mei Kotake	36+	Q
4	Risa Ota	36+	Q
5	Momoko Abe	35+	Q
6	Miu Kakizaki	35	Q
7	Futaba Ito	34+	Q
8	Ryu Nakagawa	28	Q
9	Hana Koike	27+	
10	Miku Ishii	27+	
11	Nonoha Kume	27	
12	Kiki Matsuda	25+	
13	Honoka Oda	25	
14	Mishika Ishii	23+	
15	Moe Takiguchi	23+	
16	Mai Kobayashi	23+	
16	Ai Takeuchi	23+	
18	Saki Kikuchi	23+	
19	Hatsune Takeishi	23+	
20	Miu Kurita	23+	
21	Mio Nukui	23+	
22	Mia Aoyagi	22	
23	Mashiro Kuzuu	23	
24	Tomona Takao	17+	
24	Momoka Mitashima	17+	
26	Sayaka Yoshida	13+	
27	Yuno Harigae	11+	
28	Kokoro Takada	11+	
29	Miho Nonaka	11	
30	Anon Matsufuji	11	
31	Natsumi Hirano	10+	
32	Ayane Kashiwa	10	

== Qualifications ==
=== Men ===
The men's lead qualifications took place on 12 February 2022.

Rank	Name	Qualification					Notes
Rank	Name	Route A		Route B		Points	Notes
Rank	Name	Score	Rank	Score	Rank	Points	Notes
1	Taisei Homma	TOP	1	30+	2	2.29	Q
2	Satone Yoshida	24+	3	30+	2	3.97	Q
3	Sorato Anraku	30+	23	31+	1	5.10	Q
4	Kokoro Fujii	33+	7	30+	2	5.61	Q
5	Ao Yurikusa	TOP	1	20+	23	6.12	Q
6	Tomoaki Takata	32+	13	30+	2	7.37	Q
7	Keita Dohi	34+	3	27+	13	8.08	Q
8	Neo Suzuki	33	12	30	6	8.83	Q
9	Yuji Fujiwaki	33+	7	28+	8	9.49	Q
10	Keiichiro Korenaga	32+	13	30	6	10.04	Q
11	Ryoei Nukui	33+	7	25+	17	12.37	Q
12	Kento Yamaguchi	32+	13	28+	8	12.45	Q
12	Yoshiyuki Ogata	32+	13	28+	8	12.45	Q
14	Yuki Uemura	34+	3	17+	35	12.82	Q
15	Meichi Narasaki	33+	7	24+	18	13.25	Q
16	Shuta Tanaka	34+	3	3	50	15.00	Q
17	Isamu Kawabata	30+	23	28+	8	16.12	Q
18	Zento Murashita	32	19	27+	13	16.60	Q
19	Hidemasa Nishida	31	22	27+	13	17.86	Q
20	Hiroto Shimizu	32+	13	20+	23	19.69	Q
21	Yuya Kitae	31+	20	24+	18	19.99	Q
22	Taito Nakagami	33+	7	1+	51	21.42	Q
23	Hitoshi Mineoi	10	50	28+	8	22.36	Q
24	Ritsu Kayotani	29+	33	27+	13	22.37	Q
25	Sohta Amagasa	30+	23	24+	18	22.52	Q
26	Rei Kawamata	30+	23	20+	23	25.50	Q
27	Yuta Imaizumi	32+	13	15	42	25.97	
28	Junta Sekiguchi	30+	23	20	28	27.22	
29	Kantaro Ito	29+	33	21+	22	27.55	
30	Kaya Otaka	30+	23	19+	30	28.84	
31	Masahiro Higuchi	29+	33	20+	23	29.37	
32	Genbu Uehara	30	30	20	28	29.72	
33	Uta Sumitani	31+	36	26+	18	26.65	
34	Ryo Omasa	28+	37	20+	23	30.62	
35	Kazuki Tanii	30+	23	17+	35	30.81	
36	Katsura Konishi	31+	20	14	47	31.04	
37	Reo Matsuoka	30	30	17+	35	33.64	
38	Satoki Tanaka	26	39	19+	30	35.33	
39	Aki Shinozawa	23+	40	19+	30	36.00	
40	Hayato Tsuru	30	30	15	42	36.72	
41	Hiroki Kawakami	20	42	19+	30	37.09	
42	Rikuto Inohana	29+	33	15	42	36.74	
43	Mahiro Takami	17	48	19+	30	39.40	
44	Mototaka Ishizu	20	42	17+	35	39.62	
45	Naoki Shimatani	28+	37	15	42	40.39	
46	Ryoga Tsukuda	20	42	40	39	41.47	
47	Toru Kofukuda	18+	35	40	39	42.43	
48	Tatsuma Yamaguchi	17+	46	17	39	43.13	
49	Haku Oga	17+	40	17	49	43.13	
50	Kenji Oshita	17	48	12+	48	28.25	
51	Tomoa Narasaki	5	51	14+	46	48.44	

=== Women ===
The women's lead qualifications took place on 12 February 2022.

Rank	Name	Qualification					Notes
Rank	Name	Route A		Route B		Points	Notes
Rank	Name	Score	Rank	Score	Rank	Points	Notes
1	Ai Mori	32+	1	TOP	1	1.50	Q
2	Natsuki Tanii	29+	4	TOP	1	2.74	Q
3	Futaba Ito	32+	1	28+	8	3.67	Q
4	Nonoha Kume	32	3	30+	4	3.87	Q
5	Miho Nonaka	29	7	31+	3	4.74	Q
6	Mei Kotake	29+	4	30+	4	5.00	Q
7	Mia Aoyagi	29+	4	28+	8	6.71	Q
8	Anon Matsufuji	27+	11	27+	11	12.49	Q
9	Ryu Nakagawa	20+	23	30+	4	12.65	Q
10	Hana Koike	29	7	22.5+	15	13.28	Q
11	Mishika Ishii	27	16	27+	11	14.28	Q
12	Natsumi Hirano	28+	9	22.5+	15	14.94	Q
13	Moe Takiguchi	20+	23	29+	7	14.97	Q
14	Miku Ishii	27	16	24+	14	15.43	Q
15	Momoko Abe	20+	23	28+	8	16.97	Q
16	Miu Kakizaki	27+	11	22.5+	15	17.48	Q
16	Risa Ota	27+	11	22.5+	15	17.48	Q
16	Ai Takeuchi	27+	11	22.5+	15	17.48	Q
16	Mai Kobayashi	27+	11	22.5+	15	17.48	Q
20	Mashiro Kuzuu	28+	9	22+	33	17.84	Q
21	Sayaka Yoshida	20+	23	27+	11	19.60	Q
22	Saki Kikuchi	25+	19	22.5+	15	21.13	Q
23	Hatsune Takeishi	23+	21	22.5+	15	22.21	Q
24	Miu Kurita	23	22	22.5+	15	22.74	Q
25	Yuno Harigae	27	16	22	35	25.08	Q
26	Momoka Mitashima	20+	23	22.5+	15	27.42	Q
26	Honoka Oda	20+	23	22.5+	15	27.42	Q
26	Kokoro Takada	20+	23	22.5+	15	27.42	Q
26	Ayane Kashiwa	20+	23	22.5+	15	27.42	Q
26	Kiki Matsuda	20+	23	22.5+	15	27.42	Q
26	Mio Nukui	20+	23	22.5+	15	27.42	Q
26	Serika Okawachi	20+	23	22.5+	15	27.42	Q
33	Shuri Nishida	25	20	13	45	30.00	
34	Nanako Kura	19+	42	22.5+	15	31.79	
35	Souka Hasegawa	9	45	22.5+	15	32.52	
36	Mao Nakamura	20+	23	22+	33	32.74	
37	Ichika Osawa	20+	23	22	35	34.41	
37	Nao Mori	20+	23	22	35	34.41	
37	Minami Kondo	20+	23	22	35	34.41	
40	Sana Ogura	20+	23	18	41	36.22	
41	Serika Okawachi	20+	23	17+	42	36.88	
41	Sora Ito	20+	23	17+	42	36.88	
43	Yuki Hiroshige	20+	23	15	44	37.52	
44	Hana Kudo	19+	42	22	35	39.89	
45	Asami Harada	19+	42	19+	40	41.47	
