= Lead Japan Cup 2020 =

Annual competition climbing event

- Venue: Iwate Prefectural Sports Park Sport Climbing Stadium
- Location: Morioka, Iwate, Japan
- Date: 9 – 11 August 2020
- Website: https://www.jma-climbing.org/competition/2020/ljc/

Medalists
gold medal	Hidemasa Nishida / Ai Mori
silver medal	Satone Yoshida / Akiyo Noguchi
bronze medal	Shuta Tanaka / Miu Kakizaki

The 2020 Lead Japan Cup was the 33rd edition of the annual competition lead climbing event organised by the Japan Mountaineering and Sport Climbing Association (JMSCA), held in Iwate Prefectural Sports Park Sport Climbing Stadium, Iwate.

LJC is the sole selection event for Japan's national lead team. LJC 2020 was the first domestic lead competition of the 2020 season. 51 men and 47 women competed, with Hidemasa Nishida and Ai Mori winning the men's and women's titles respectively.

== Finals ==
=== Men ===
The men's lead finals took place on 11 August 2020.

Rank	Name	Final
1	Hidemasa Nishida	TOP
2	Satone Yoshida	36+
3	Shuta Tanaka	36
4	Tomoa Narasaki	35+
5	Kokoro Fujii	28+
6	Zento Murashita	28+
7	Masahiro Higuchi	28+
8	Yoshiyuki Ogata	28+

=== Women ===
The women's lead finals took place on 11 August 2020.

Rank	Name	Final
1	Ai Mori	TOP
2	Akiyo Noguchi	TOP
3	Miu Kakizaki	TOP
4	Natsumi Hirano	TOP
5	Natsuki Tanii	40+
6	Hana Koike	40+
7	Futaba Ito	40+
8	Momoko Abe	39+

== Semifinals ==
=== Men ===
The men's lead semifinals took place on 10 August 2020.

Rank	Name	Semifinal	Notes
1	Hidemasa Nishida	35+	Q
2	Kokoro Fujii	35+	Q
3	Zento Murashita	33+	Q
4	Masahiro Higuchi	33+	Q
5	Tomoa Narasaki	33	Q
6	Yoshiyuki Ogata	31+	Q
7	Shuta Tanaka	31	Q
8	Satone Yoshida	30+	Q
9	Ao Yurikusa	30+	
10	Kai Harada	30+	
11	Tomoaki Takata	30	
12	Rei Sugimoto	30	
13	Junta Sekiguchi	27+	
14	Sohta Amagasa	27+	
15	Meichi Narasaki	27	
16	Ryoei Nukui	26	
17	Keita Dohi	25+	
18	Taito Nakagami	24+	
19	Shion Omata	24+	
20	Taisei Homma	22	
21	Keiichiro Korenaga	22	
22	Ryohei Kameyama	20	
23	Hibiki Yamauchi	20	
24	Yuya Kitae	20	
25	Hiroto Shimizu	19+	
26	Kento Yamaguchi	16+	

=== Women ===
The women's lead semifinals took place on 11 August 2020.

Rank	Name	Semifinal	Notes
1	Ai Mori	TOP	Q
2	Natsuki Tanii	TOP	Q
3	Akiyo Noguchi	49+	Q
4	Hana Koike	48	Q
5	Miu Kakizaki	47+	Q
6	Momoko Abe	47+	Q
7	Futaba Ito	47+	Q
8	Natsumi Hirano	46+	Q
9	Aika Tajima	46+	
10	Nonoha Kume	46	
11	Mio Nukui	45+	
12	Nao Mori	45+	
13	Miho Nonaka	44+	
14	Ryu Nakagawa	44+	
15	Risa Ota	44+	
16	Mei Kotake	43	
17	Miu Kurita	40+	
18	Mia Aoyagi	38+	
19	Kokoro Takada	38+	
20	Yuki Hiroshige	34+	
21	Saki Kikuchi	33+	
22	Momoka Miyajima	33	
23	Honoka Moriwaki	32+	
24	Tomoko Kajima	30+	
25	Rin Sato	20+	
26	Mao Nakamura	20+	

== Qualifications ==
=== Men ===
The men's lead qualifications took place on 9 August 2020.

Rank	Name	Qualification					Notes
Rank	Name	Route A		Route B		Points	Notes
Rank	Name	Score	Rank	Score	Rank	Points	Notes
1	Tomoa Narasaki	35+	8.5	TOP	1	2.92	Q
2	Taisei Homma	35+	8.5	39	2.5	4.61	Q
3	Satone Yoshida	35+	8.5	38+	4	5.83	Q
4	Tomoaki Takata	35+	8.5	36+	5	6.52	Q
5	Zento Murashita	35+	8.5	35+	6	7.14	Q
6	Yoshiyuki Ogata	33	24	39	2.5	7.75	Q
7	Ryoei Nukui	35+	8.5	34+	8.5	8.50	Q
7	Keiichiro Korenaga	35+	8.5	34+	8.5	8.50	Q
9	Ao Yurikusa	35+	8.5	33+	11	9.67	Q
10	Taito Nakagami	35+	8.5	32+	14	10.91	Q
11	Keita Dohi	34+	20	34+	8.5	13.04	Q
11	Rei Sugimoto	34+	20	34+	8.5	13.04	Q
13	Hiroto Shimizu	35+	8.5	26+	21	13.36	Q
13	Kai Harada	35+	8.5	26+	21	13.36	Q
13	Hidemasa Nishida	35+	8.5	26+	21	13.36	Q
16	Shion Omata	35+	8.5	25+	27.5	15.29	Q
16	Masahiro Higuchi	35+	8.5	25+	27.5	15.29	Q
18	Meichi Narasaki	34+	20	33	12.5	15.81	Q
19	Tatsuma Yamaguchi	35+	8.5	23+	37.5	17.85	Q
20	Shuta Tanaka	35+	8.5	22	43	19.12	Q
21	Ryohei Kameyama	26+	34.5	33	12.5	20.77	Q
22	Hibiki Yamauchi	30+	28	29+	16	21.17	Q
23	Yuya Kitae	30	31	29+	16	22.27	Q
24	Sohta Amagasa	34+	20	25+	27.5	23.45	Q
24	Junta Sekiguchi	34+	20	25+	27.5	23.45	Q
26	Kokoro Fujii	35	17	24+	34	24.04	Q
27	Yuta Imaizumi	30+	28	26+	21	24.25	
28	Yuji Fujiwaki	33+	23	25+	27.5	25.15	
29	Yuki Hada	30	31	26+	21	25.51	
30	Yuya Tanaka	26	36.5	28+	18	25.63	
31	Kaya Otaka	31+	25.5	28+	18	25.63	
32	Ryo Omasa	20	49.5	29+	16	28.14	
33	Haruki Uemura	26+	34.5	25+	27.5	30.80	
34	Hajime Takeda	31+	25.5	22+	40.5	32.14	
35	Hiroki Kawakami	25	41	25+	27.5	33.58	
36	Keita Mineoi	30+	28	22+	40.5	33.67	
37	Isamu Kawabata	26	36.5	25	32.5	34.44	
38	Satoki Tanaka	25+	38	24	38.8	36.73	
39	Kantaro Ito	30	31	21+	44	36.93	
40	Sakuya Ishiguro	29+	33	21	46.5	39.17	
41	Yuta Kugai	25	41	23+	37.5	39.21	
42	Naoki Tsurumoto	20	49.5	25	32.5	40.11	
43	Daichi Nakajima	22	46	24	35.5	40.41	
44	Yuki Takeuchi	25	41	22+	40.5	40.75	
45	Takumi Osato	25	41	21	46.5	43.66	
45	Shuto Fujino	25	41	21	46.5	43.66	
47	Kenshin Hara	20	49.5	22+	40.5	44.77	
48	Akihisa Kaji	22+	45	10+	49.5	47.20	
49	Haku Oga	23+	44	10	51	47.37	
50	Kento Yamaguchi	20	49.5	21	46.5	47.98	
51	Yuya Hommyo	20+	47	10+	49.5	48.23	

=== Women ===
The women's lead qualifications took place on 10 August 2020.

Rank	Name	Qualification					Notes
Rank	Name	Route A		Route B		Points	Notes
Rank	Name	Score	Rank	Score	Rank	Points	Notes
1	Akiyo Noguchi	TOP	1.5	TOP	1.5	1.50	Q
2	Miho Nonaka	TOP	1.5	37	5.5	2.87	Q
2	Ai Mori	43+	5.5	TOP	1.5	2.87	Q
4	Natsuki Tanii	43+	5.5	39+	3	4.06	Q
5	Natsumi Hirano	43+	5.5	37	5.5	5.50	Q
6	Ryu Nakagawa	42+	11	39	4	6.63	Q
7	Miu Kakizaki	43+	5.5	36+	9	7.04	Q
7	Aika Tajima	43+	5.5	36+	9	7.04	Q
9	Hana Koike	43+	5.5	35+	14.5	8.93	Q
10	Mei Kotake	42+	11	36+	9	9.95	Q
10	Momoko Abe	42+	11	36+	9	9.95	Q
10	Nonoha Kume	42+	11	36+	9	9.95	Q
13	Mio Nukui	42+	11	35+	14.5	12.63	Q
14	Risa Ota	40+	18.5	36	12	14.90	Q
15	Futaba Ito	41+	15.5	35+	14.5	14.99	Q
16	Nao Mori	41+	15.5	35	17.5	16.47	Q
17	Yuki Hiroshige	40+	18.5	32+	20	19.24	Q
18	Momoka Miyajima	41+	15.5	31+	24	19.29	Q
19	Saki Kikuchi	41+	15.5	30+	26	20.07	Q
20	Rin Sato	36+	24	35	17.5	20.49	Q
21	Miu Kurita	40	20.5	32	22.5	21.48	Q
22	Mia Aoyagi	28+	34	35+	14.5	22.20	Q
23	Tomoko Kajima	29	29	32+	20	24.08	Q
24	Kokoro Takada	39+	22	30	28	24.82	Q
25	Honoka Moriwaki	30	28	32	22.5	25.10	Q
26	Mao Nakamura	39	23	29+	29	25.83	Q
27	Moe Takiguchi	30+	27	30+	26	26.50	
28	Tomona Takao	40	20.5	24	37	27.54	
29	Anon Matsufuji	33+	25	27+	31	27.84	
30	Hana Kudo	27+	40.5	32+	20	28.46	
31	Nanako Kura	28+	34	30+	26	29.73	
31	Rin Ninomiya	32+	26	25+	34	29.73	
33	Asami Harada	28+	34	27	32	32.98	
34	Mashiro Kuzuu	28+	34	24+	35	34.50	
35	Shuri Nishida	28+	34	24	37	35.47	
35	Serika Okawachi	28+	34	24	37	35.47	
37	Kiki Matsuda	28	39	26+	33	35.87	
38	None Kikuchi	26+	43.5	28	30	36.12	
39	Ayane Kashiwa	28+	34	23+	39.5	36.65	
39	Karin Kojima	28+	34	23+	39.5	36.65	
41	Nanami Nobe	28+	34	22	43	38.24	
42	Kanami Suzuki	27+	40.5	22+	41.5	41.00	
43	Aya Sugawara	26+	43.5	22+	41.5	42.49	
44	Yuka Higuchi	26+	43.5	19+	44	43.75	
45	Runa Inouchi	26+	43.5	19	45	44.24	
46	Airi Hayashi	26	46	17+	46	46.00	
47	Moeka Kikuchi	19+	47	16	47	47.00	
