= Lead Japan Cup 2021 =

Annual competition climbing event

- Venue: Matsuyamashita Park General Gymnasium
- Location: Inzai, Chiba, Japan
- Date: 26 – 28 March 2021
- Website: https://www.jma-climbing.org/competition/2021/ljc/

Medalists
gold medal	Satone Yoshida / Ai Mori
silver medal	Masahiro Higuchi / Akiyo Noguchi
bronze medal	Kokoro Fujii / Ryu Nakagawa

The 2021 Lead Japan Cup was the 34th edition of the annual competition lead climbing event organised by the Japan Mountaineering and Sport Climbing Association (JMSCA), held in Matsuyamashita Park General Gymnasium, Inzai.

LJC is the sole selection event for Japan's national lead team. Athletes who place highly at the LJC are eligible to compete in the Lead World Cups, subject to JMSCA's prevailing selection criteria. LJC 2021 was the first domestic lead competition of the 2021 season. 52 men and 44 women competed, with Satone Yoshida and Ai Mori winning the men's and women's titles respectively.

== Finals ==
=== Men ===
The men's lead finals took place on 28 March 2021.

Rank	Name	Final
1	Satone Yoshida	34+
2	Masahiro Higuchi	34+
3	Kokoro Fujii	33+
4	Sohta Amagasa	31
5	Shuta Tanaka	20+
6	Naoki Shimatani	18+
7	Zento Murashita	18+
8	Ao Yurikusa	18+

=== Women ===
The women's lead finals took place on 28 March 2021.

Rank	Name	Final
1	Ai Mori	39
2	Akiyo Noguchi	37+
3	Ryu Nakagawa	36+
4	Natsuki Tanii	34+
5	Momoko Abe	34+
6	Aika Tajima	33+
7	Miu Kakizaki	33+
8	Natsumi Hirano	24+

== Semifinals ==
=== Men ===
The men's lead semifinals took place on 27 March 2021.

Rank	Name	Semifinal	Notes
1	Kokoro Fujii	39+	Q
2	Sohta Amagasa	39+	Q
3	Naoki Shimatani	37+	Q
4	Zento Murashita	37+	Q
5	Satone Yoshida	35+	Q
6	Shuta Tanaka	35+	Q
7	Masahiro Higuchi	34+	Q
8	Ao Yurikusa	34+	Q
9	Taito Nakagami	34+	
10	Meichi Narasaki	34+	
11	Ryo Omasa	33	
12	Yuji Fujiwaki	33	
13	Rei Sugimoto	31	
14	Tomoaki Takata	30	
15	Taisei Homma	29+	
16	Yoshiyuki Ogata	28+	
17	Kaya Otaka	28+	
18	Yuta Imaizumi	28	
19	Jinji Mineo	28	
20	Yuya Kitae	28	
21	Katsura Konishi	27+	
22	Kai Harada	27+	
23	Toru Kofukuda	25+	
24	Rei Kawamata	23+	
25	Ryoei Nukui	23+	
26	Kento Yamaguchi	21	

=== Women ===
The women's lead semifinals took place on 27 March 2021.

Rank	Name	Semifinal	Notes
1	Ai Mori	TOP	Q
2	Natsuki Tanii	40	Q
3	Aika Tajima	36+	Q
4	Akiyo Noguchi	36	Q
5	Momoko Abe	35+	Q
6	Natsumi Hirano	34+	Q
7	Miu Kakizaki	34+	Q
8	Ryu Nakagawa	33+	Q
9	Futaba Ito	33+	
10	Miho Nonaka	33+	
11	Mei Kotake	32.5+	
12	Tomona Takao	32.5+	
13	Mishika Ishii	32+	
14	Hana Kudo	32+	
15	Nao Mori	31+	
16	Takada Kokoro	31+	
17	Hana Koike	31	
18	Mio Nukui	31	
19	Mia Aoyagi	30+	
20	Nanako Kura	30	
21	Moe Takiguchi	29+	
22	Nonoha Kume	19	
23	Sana Ogura	18+	
24	Yuki Hiroshige	18+	
25	Risa Ota	10	
26	Sayaka Yoshida	7	

== Qualifications ==
=== Men ===
The men's lead qualifications took place on 26 March 2021.

Rank	Name	Qualification					Notes
Rank	Name	Route A		Route B		Points	Notes
Rank	Name	Score	Rank	Score	Rank	Points	Notes
1	Masahiro Higuchi	45+	1	30+	9	3.00	Q
2	Rei Sugimoto	41+	6	32+	3	4.24	Q
3	Taisei Homma	45	2	29+	14	5.29	Q
4	Kokoro Fujii	40	10	32+	3	5.48	Q
5	Tomoaki Takata	39	15.5	32+	3	6.82	Q
5	Naoki Shimatani	39	15.5	32+	3	6.82	Q
7	Zento Murashita	44	4	29+	14	7.48	Q
8	Ao Yurikusa	38+	21	32+	3	7.94	Q
9	Satone Yoshida	44+	3	26+	21.5	8.03	Q
10	Sohta Amagasa	43	5	26+	21.5	10.37	Q
11	Katsura Konishi	39+	12	30+	9	10.39	Q
12	Rei Kawamata	38+	21	31	6	11.22	Q
13	Taito Nakagami	39	15.5	30+	9	11.81	Q
14	Shuta Tanaka	41	7.5	26+	21.5	12.70	Q
14	Yoshiyuki Ogata	41	7.5	26+	21.5	12.70	Q
16	Kai Harada	39	15.5	30	12	13.64	Q
17	Ryo Omasa	38+	21	30+	9	13.75	Q
18	Yuji Fujiwaki	39+	12	27+	16	13.86	Q
19	Meichi Narasaki	39+	12	26+	21.5	16.06	Q
20	Yuta Imaizumi	31+	32	30+	9	19.97	Q
21	Ryoei Nukui	40+	9	14+	36	18.00	Q
22	Toru Kofukuda	38+	21	26+	21.5	21.25	Q
22	Kento Yamaguchi	38+	21	26+	21.5	21.25	Q
24	Jinji Mineo	28+	38	29+	14	23.07	Q
25	Kaya Otaka	32+	30.5	26+	21.5	25.61	Q
26	Yuya Kitae	38	25.5	25+	27	26.24	Q
27	Keita Dohi	20	45	27	17	27.66	
28	Mahiro Takami	32+	30.5	23+	28	29.22	
29	Yuki Uemura	38+	21	10+	45	30.74	
29	Junta Sekiguchi	38+	21	10+	45	30.74	
31	Daichi Nakajima	31	33.5	22	30	31.70	
32	Haruyoshi Morimoto	30+	35.5	21	31.5	33.44	
33	Hidemasa Nishida	38	25.5	10+	45	33.87	
34	Yuki Takeuchi	27+	41	23	29	34.48	
35	Mizuki Tajima	36+	27	10+	45	34.86	
36	Kantaro Ito	36	28	10+	45	35.50	
37	Neo Suzuki	16	49.5	26	26	35.87	
38	Nao Tsurumoto	28+	38	19	34	35.94	
39	Aki Shinozawa	34+	29	10+	45	36.12	
40	Keita Watabe	27+	41	19+	33	36.78	
41	Akihisa Kaji	27+	41	17+	35	37.88	
42	Sakuya Ishiguro	18	47	21	31.5	38.48	
43	Daiki Sano	31	33.5	10+	45	38.83	
44	Atsushi Asano	30+	35.5	10+	45	39.97	
45	Satoki Tanaka	28+	38	10+	45	41.35	
46	Isamu Kawabata	16	49.5	14	37	42.80	
47	Kenshin Hara	26	43	10+	45	43.99	
48	Haruto Nishimoto	24	44	10+	45	44.50	
49	Shuto Fujino	19+	46	10+	45	45.50	
50	Kenji Oshita	16	49.5	10+	45	47.20	
50	Teppei Ushiro	16	49.5	10+	45	47.20	
52	Yuichi Iwami	15+	52	10+	45	48.37	

=== Women ===
The women's lead qualifications took place on 27 March 2021.

Rank	Name	Qualification					Notes
Rank	Name	Route A		Route B		Points	Notes
Rank	Name	Score	Rank	Score	Rank	Points	Notes
1	Ai Mori	42+	3	TOP	1	2.29	Q
1	Momoko Abe	42+	3	TOP	1	2.29	Q
3	Natsuki Tanii	TOP	1	41+	3	2.45	Q
4	Aika Tajima	TOP	1	40+	6	3.00	Q
5	Natsumi Hirano	41+	5	41+	3	5.29	Q
5	Akiyo Noguchi	41+	5	41+	3	5.29	Q
7	Mei Kotake	41+	5	39+	7	7.25	Q
8	Nao Mori	41+	5	37+	10	8.78	Q
9	Ryu Nakagawa	41	10	39+	7	9.08	Q
10	Hana Koike	41+	5	34+	13	10.25	Q
11	Futaba Ito	40+	13	38+	9	11.42	Q
12	Tomona Takao	41	10	34+	13	12.85	Q
12	Miu Kakizaki	41	10	34+	13	12.85	Q
14	Sana Ogura	37+	18	37+	10	14.65	Q
14	Nonoha Kume	37+	18	37+	10	14.65	Q
16	Miho Nonaka	40+	13	34+	13	17.10	Q
17	Risa Ota	40+	13	34	18	16.60	Q
18	Mio Nukui	37+	18	34+	13	17.10	Q
19	Yuki Hiroshige	37	22	33+	21	21.75	Q
20	Sayaka Yoshida	40+	13	28	35	22.69	Q
21	Moe Takiguchi	35	24	32+	23	23.75	Q
22	Mishika Ishii	39	17	28	35	24.57	Q
23	Hana Kudo	37+	18	29+	29	24.59	Q
24	Takada Kokoro	36+	23	30	27	25.15	Q
25	Mia Aoyagi	31+	29	33+	21	25.40	Q
26	Nanako Kura	34	26	31+	25	25.50	Q
27	Mashiro Kuzuu	29+	34	34	18	26.33	
28	Miu Kurita	31+	29	32+	23	26.55	
29	Momoka Mitashima	34+	25	29+	29	27.84	
30	Mai Kobayashi	24+	42	34	18	28.58	
31	Ayane Kashiwa	30	33	30+	26	29.29	
32	Ai Takeuchi	30+	32	30	27	29.67	
33	Mao Nakamura	31+	29	29+	29	30.05	
34	Rin Sato	32+	28	29	34	30.85	
35	Saki Kikuchi	29+	34	29+	29	33.64	
36	Sayuri Nakata	33	27	16	43	34.07	
37	Serika Okawachi	28+	40	29+	29	35.21	
38	Asami Harada	29+	34	27	37	36.75	
39	Karin Kojima	29+	34	26+	38	37.49	
40	Kiki Matsuda	29+	34	26	40	38.21	
41	Rin Ninomiya	29+	34	23+	41	38.69	
42	Nanami Nobe	24+	42	26+	38	40.69	
43	Minami Kondo	27+	41	22	42	41.50	
44	Moe Yoshimura	24+	42	5+	44	43.50	
