= Lead climbing at the 2023 IFSC Climbing World Cup =

- Location: Innsbruck, Austria; Villars, Switzerland; Chamonix, France; Briançon, France; Koper, Slovenia; Wujiang, China
- Dates: 14 June – 24 September 2023

Champions
- Men: (Japan) Sorato Anraku
- Women: (Austria) Jessica Pilz

Competition lead climbing at the 2023 IFSC Climbing World Cup was held over six stages at six different locations, from 14 June to 24 September 2023. The top three in each competition received medals, and at the end of the season, the overall winners were awarded trophies. The overall winners were determined based upon points, which athletes were awarded for finishing in the top 40 of each event. Sorato Anraku won the men's season title, Jessica Pilz won the women's season title, and Japan won the national team title.

== Overview ==
| Date | Location | Routesetters* | Men | Women |
|---|---|---|---|---|
| June, 14-18 | Innsbruck, Austria | (France) **Yann Genoux**; (Austria) Florian Murnig; (Italy) Alberto Gnerro | (Switzerland) Sascha Lehmann | (Slovenia) Janja Garnbret |
| June 30 - July 2 | Villars, Switzerland | (France) **Romain Cabessut**; (France) Yann Genoux; (France) Julien Gras | (Austria) Jakob Schubert | (Slovenia) Janja Garnbret |
| July, 7-9 | Chamonix, France | (Japan) **Hiroshi Okano**; (United States) Brad Weaver; (Ecuador) Pedro Coral; (Poland) Olga Niemiec | (United Kingdom) Toby Roberts | (South Korea) Jain Kim |
| July, 14-15 | Briançon, France | (Germany) **Christian Bindhammer**; (Poland) Marcin Wszolek; (Italy) Alberto Gnerro | (Japan) Sorato Anraku | (Slovenia) Vita Lukan |
| September, 8-9 | Koper, Slovenia | (Poland) **Adam Pustelnik**; (Czech Republic) Jan Zbranek; (Austria) Martin Hammerer | (Japan) Sorato Anraku | (Slovenia) Janja Garnbret |
| September, 22-24 | Wujiang, China | (Poland) **Adam Pustelnik**; (China) Ma Zida; (Japan) Akito Matsushima | (Japan) Sorato Anraku | (Japan) Ai Mori |
| **OVERALL WINNERS** | | | (Japan) **Sorato Anraku** | (Austria) **Jessica Pilz** |
| **NATIONAL TEAM** | | | **Japan** | |

* Chief routesetters are in bold.

== Overall ranking ==
The overall ranking is determined based upon points, which athletes are awarded for finishing in the top 80 of each individual event. The end-of-season standings are based on the sum of points earned from the five best finishes for each athlete. Results displayed (in brackets) are not counted. The national ranking is the sum of the points of that country's three best male and female athletes.

=== Men ===
The results of the ten most successful athletes of the Lead World Cup 2023:

| Rank | Name | Points | Innsbruck | Villars | Chamonix | Briançon | Koper | Wujiang |
|---|---|---|---|---|---|---|---|---|
| 1 | (Japan) Sorato Anraku | 4300 | 4. 610 | (6. 495) | 3. 690 | 1. 1000 | 1. 1000 | 1. 1000 |
| 2 | (Germany) Alexander Megos | 2650 | 2. 805 | 3. 690 | 4. 610 | - | 5. 545 | - |
| 3 | (Japan) Taisei Homma | 2455 | 9. 380 | 13. 280 | 12. 300 | 2. 805 | (13. 270*) | 3. 690 |
| 4 | (Japan) Shion Omata | 2445 | 12. 300 | 8. 415 | 9. 380 | 5. 545 | (15. 240) | 2. 805 |
| 5 | (United Kingdom) Toby Roberts | 2440 | 16. 220 | 4. 610 | 1. 1000 | - | 4. 610 | - |
| 6 | (Japan) Satone Yoshida | 2080 | 6. 495 | 12. 300 | 11. 325 | 3. 690 | 13. 270* | (14. 260) |
| 7 | (Japan) Yoshiyuki Ogata | 2065 | (18. 185) | 17. 205 | 14. 260 | 4. 610 | 9. 380 | 4. 610 |
| 8 | (Switzerland) Sascha Lehmann | 1940 | 1. 1000 | 18. 185 | - | - | 12. 300 | 7. 455 |
| 9 | (Japan) Masahiro Higuchi | 1720 | 7. 455 | 21. 145 | (26. 84) | 6. 495 | 11. 325 | 12. 300 |
| 10 | (Austria) Jakob Schubert | 1690 | 3. 690 | 1. 1000 | - | - | - | - |

=== Women ===
The results of the ten most successful athletes of the Lead World Cup 2023:

| Rank | Name | Points | Innsbruck | Villars | Chamonix | Briançon | Koper | Wujiang |
|---|---|---|---|---|---|---|---|---|
| 1 | (Austria) Jessica Pilz | 3235 | 3. 690 | 2. 805 | 4. 610 | - | 11. 325 | 2. 805 |
| 2 | (Slovenia) Janja Garnbret | 3000 | 1. 1000 | 1. 1000 | - | - | 1. 1000 | - |
| 3 | (Slovenia) Vita Lukan | 2725 | (17. 205) | 13. 280 | 7. 455 | 1. 1000 | 3. 690 | 12. 300 |
| 4 | (Japan) Ai Mori | 2610 | 2. 805 | - | - | - | 2. 805 | 1. 1000 |
| 5 | (Japan) Natsuki Tanii | 2525 | (26. 84) | 6. 495 | 9. 380 | 8. 415 | 5. 545 | 3. 690 |
| 6 | (South Korea) Jain Kim | 2485 | 11. 325 | 7. 455 | 1. 1000 | 14. 250 | (20. 155) | 7. 455 |
| 7 | (South Korea) Seo Chae-hyun | 2430 | 5. 545 | 4. 610 | 8. 415 | 14. 250 | 4. 610 | - |
| 8 | (Slovenia) Mia Krampl | 2275 | 6. 495 | 5. 545 | 6. 495 | - | 8. 415 | 11. 325 |
| 9 | (Japan) Nonoha Kume | 2090 | - | 16. 220 | 2. 805 | 4. 610 | 7. 455 | - |
| 10 | (United Kingdom) Molly Thompson-Smith | 1885 | 9. 380 | 9. 380 | 12. 300 | 5. 545 | 13. 280 | - |

== Innsbruck, Austria (June, 14-18) ==
110 men and 89 women attended the event.

In the men's, Sascha Lehmann won the competition ahead of Alexander Megos. In the final, Lehmann and Megos received identical scores. Lehmann was awarded the gold by virtue of his better semi-final performance. Jakob Schubert won the bronze medal.

In women's, Slovenian Janja Garnbret won the competition — marking her third Lead World Cup win in Innsbruck. Japan's Ai Mori finished second. Austria's Jessica Pilz placed third.

| Men | | | | | | Women | | | | | |
| Rank | Name | Qualification | | Semi-Final | Final | Rank | Name | Qualification | | Semi-Final | Final |
| Rank | Name | R1 | R2 | Semi-Final | Final | Rank | Name | R1 | R2 | Semi-Final | Final |
|---|---|---|---|---|---|---|---|---|---|---|---|
| 1st place, gold medalist(s) | (Switzerland) Sascha Lehmann | 41 | TOP | 43+ | 44+ | 1st place, gold medalist(s) | (Slovenia) Janja Garnbret | TOP | 47+ | 46 | 39+ |
| 2nd place, silver medalist(s) | (Germany) Alexander Megos | 41 | TOP | 39+ | 44+ | 2nd place, silver medalist(s) | (Japan) Ai Mori | 49+ | 43+ | 46+ | 33+ |
| 3rd place, bronze medalist(s) | (Austria) Jakob Schubert | 39+ | TOP | 43 | 42+ | 3rd place, bronze medalist(s) | (Austria) Jessica Pilz | 49+ | 40+ | 40+ | 25+ |
| 4 | (Japan) Sorato Anraku | 41+ | TOP | 40 | 42+ | 4 | (United States) Brooke Raboutou | 43+ | 43 | 34+ | 25+ |
| 5 | (France) Mejdi Schalck | 39 | 39 | 40 | 42+ | 5 | (South Korea) Seo Chae-hyun | 49+ | 45 | 46+ | 25 |
| 6 | (Japan) Satone Yoshida | 41+ | 41+ | 39+ | 42+ | 6 | (Slovenia) Mia Krampl | 45+ | 39+ | 36+ | 25 |
| 7 | (Japan) Masahiro Higuchi | 39+ | 38+ | 42+ | 42 | 7 | (United States) Natalia Grossman | 46+ | 43+ | 34+ | 24+ |
| 8 | (Spain) Alberto Ginés López | 21 | 40+ | 40 | 42 | 8 | (France) Hélène Janicot | 37+ | 43+ | 32+ | 7+ |
| 9 | (Japan) Taisei Homma | 41 | 40+ | 42 | 40+ | | | | | | |

== Villars, Switzerland (June 30 - July 2) ==
94 men and 83 women attended the event.

In men's, Innsbruck winner Sascha Lehmann failed to advance past the semi-finals. Last year's winner Taisei Homma failed to advance past the semi-finals. Austrian Jakob Schubert won the competition — his first lead World Cup win since Innsbruck 2021. Czech Republic's Adam Ondra and Germany's Alexander Megos claimed silver and bronze respectively.

In women's, Slovenia's Janja Garnbret took the win, topping all routes in the qualification, semi-final and final rounds. This marked Garnbret's seventh consecutive Villars Lead World Cup win. Austria's Jessica Pilz and USA's Brooke Raboutou placed second and third respectively.

| Men | | | | | | Women | | | | | |
| Rank | Name | Qualification | | Semi-Final | Final | Rank | Name | Qualification | | Semi-Final | Final |
| Rank | Name | R1 | R2 | Semi-Final | Final | Rank | Name | R1 | R2 | Semi-Final | Final |
|---|---|---|---|---|---|---|---|---|---|---|---|
| 1st place, gold medalist(s) | (Austria) Jakob Schubert | 40+ | TOP | 36+ | 42+ | 1st place, gold medalist(s) | (Slovenia) Janja Garnbret | TOP | TOP | TOP | TOP |
| 2nd place, silver medalist(s) | (Czech Republic) Adam Ondra | 41 | 33 | 39+ | 41+ | 2nd place, silver medalist(s) | (Austria) Jessica Pilz | 41+ | TOP | 35+ | 43+ |
| 3rd place, bronze medalist(s) | (Germany) Alexander Megos | 40+ | 26+ | 36+ | 40 | 3rd place, bronze medalist(s) | (United States) Brooke Raboutou | TOP | 37+ | 45+ | 43 |
| 4 | (United Kingdom) Toby Roberts | 40+ | 35 | 36+ | 39+ | 4 | (South Korea) Seo Chae-hyun | 39+ | TOP | 45+ | 43 |
| 5 | (United States) Colin Duffy | 38 | 29+ | TOP | 37+ | 5 | (Slovenia) Mia Krampl | 36+ | 34+ | 37 | 40+ |
| 6 | (Japan) Sorato Anraku | 37 | 34 | TOP | 36+ | 6 | (Japan) Natsuki Tanii | 41+ | 20+ | 40+ | 36 |
| 7 | (China) Pan Yufei | 38+ | 30+ | 32+ | 34 | 7 | (South Korea) Jain Kim | 39+ | 34+ | 36 | 22+ |
| 8 | (Japan) Shion Omata | 37 | 34+ | 33+ | 24+ | 8 | (Austria) Mattea Pötzi | 34+ | 30+ | 37+ | 17+ |

== Chamonix, France (July, 7-9) ==
92 men and 83 women attended the event.

In men's, Great Britain's Toby Roberts secured the only top in the final climbed second in the final — claiming his first Lead World Cup win. France's Sam Avezou and Japan's Sorato Anraku won their first IFSC World Cup medals —silver and bronze respectively.

In women's, South Korean veteran Jain Kim claimed gold. Japan's Nonoha Kume claimed her first World Cup silver medal at her second World Cup ahead of France's Hélène Janicot due to countback to semi-finals.

| Men | | | | | | Women | | | | | |
| Rank | Name | Qualification | | Semi-Final | Final | Rank | Name | Qualification | | Semi-Final | Final |
| Rank | Name | R1 | R2 | Semi-Final | Final | Rank | Name | R1 | R2 | Semi-Final | Final |
|---|---|---|---|---|---|---|---|---|---|---|---|
| 1st place, gold medalist(s) | (United Kingdom) Toby Roberts | TOP | TOP | 50+ | TOP | 1st place, gold medalist(s) | (South Korea) Jain Kim | TOP | 35+ | 39+ | 43+ |
| 2nd place, silver medalist(s) | (France) Sam Avezou | 45+ | TOP | 39+ | 50 | 2nd place, silver medalist(s) | (Japan) Nonoha Kume | TOP | TOP | 43+ | 38+ |
| 3rd place, bronze medalist(s) | (Japan) Sorato Anraku | TOP | TOP | 50+ | 48 | 3rd place, bronze medalist(s) | (France) Hélène Janicot | 46+ | 32+ | 36 | 38+ |
| 4 | (Germany) Alexander Megos | 44+ | TOP | 40+ | 46+ | 4 | (Austria) Jessica Pilz | TOP | TOP | 44+ | 37+ |
| 5 | (Austria) Stefan Scherz | 37+ | TOP | 42 | 41 | 5 | (Japan) Miho Nonaka | 42+ | TOP | 36+ | 37+ |
| 6 | (United States) Colin Duffy | 44 | TOP | 46+ | 39+ | 6 | (Slovenia) Mia Krampl | TOP | 35+ | 35 | 33 |
| 7 | (Slovenia) Luka Potočar | 44 | TOP | 39+ | 39+ | 7 | (Slovenia) Vita Lukan | 42+ | 35+ | 35 | 29+ |
| 8 | (South Korea) Lee Do-hyun | 44+ | TOP | 40+ | 39 | 8 | (South Korea) Seo Chae-hyun | TOP | TOP | 46+ | 22 |

== Briançon, France (July, 14-15) ==
76 men and 67 women attended the event.

In men's, the Japanese team swept the podium. Sorato Anraku clinched his first lead World Cup win. Taisei Homma placed second, and Satone Yoshida placed third. There were no fewer than seven Japanese climbers in the men's final - a World Cup record. Homma and Yoshida had identical final scores but Homma claimed silver by virtue of his better semi-final performance.

In women's, Chamonix winner Jain Kim failed to advance past the semi-finals. In the final, Slovenia's Vita Lukan won her first lead World Cup ahead of Czechia's Eliska Adamovska and France's Manon Hily, who won her first World Cup bronze medal.

| Men | | | | | | Women | | | | | |
| Rank | Name | Qualification | | Semi-Final | Final | Rank | Name | Qualification | | Semi-Final | Final |
| Rank | Name | R1 | R2 | Semi-Final | Final | Rank | Name | R1 | R2 | Semi-Final | Final |
|---|---|---|---|---|---|---|---|---|---|---|---|
| 1st place, gold medalist(s) | (Japan) Sorato Anraku | TOP | TOP | TOP | TOP | 1st place, gold medalist(s) | (Slovenia) Vita Lukan | 41+ | 41+ | 44+ | 46 |
| 2nd place, silver medalist(s) | (Japan) Taisei Homma | 45+ | TOP | 45+ | 49+ | 2nd place, silver medalist(s) | (Czech Republic) Eliska Adamovska | 42+ | TOP | 49+ | 44+ |
| 3rd place, bronze medalist(s) | (Japan) Satone Yoshida | TOP | 40+ | 43+ | 49+ | 3rd place, bronze medalist(s) | (France) Manon Hily | 44+ | 41+ | 44+ | 44+ |
| 4 | (Japan) Yoshiyuki Ogata | 45+ | 36 | 43 | 49 | 4 | (Japan) Nonoha Kume | 49+ | 44+ | 49 | 43+ |
| 5 | (Japan) Shion Omata | 45+ | TOP | 43 | 44+ | 5 | (United Kingdom) Molly Thompson-Smith | 50+ | 42+ | 44+ | 35 |
| 6 | (Japan) Masahiro Higuchi | 45+ | 40 | TOP | 40+ | 6 | (France) Camille Pouget | 42+ | 38+ | 44+ | 34+ |
| 7 | (Sweden) Hannes Puman | 43+ | 36+ | 46 | 39 | 7 | (Germany) Martina Demmel | 40+ | 40 | 43+ | 34+ |
| 8 | (Japan) Haruki Uemura | 40+ | 36+ | 45+ | 37+ | 8 | (Japan) Natsuki Tanii | TOP | 43+ | 45+ | 12+ |

== Koper, Slovenia (September, 8-9) ==
59 men and 62 women attended the event.

In men's, the final route saw many athletes struggling low down the route with friction on a sloper, resulting in similar scores for 5 of the 8 climbers. Japan's Sorato Anraku, having just won the Briançon lead World Cup, topped the final route, securing the win and the overall 2023 lead World Cup title. USA's Jesse Grupper took second place and Olympic champion Alberto Ginés López took third, his first World Cup medal since 2019.

In women's, Olympic champion Janja Garnbret topped the final route to claim the win. Last year's Koper World Cup winner Ai Mori finished second and Slovenian Vita Lukan took third.

| Men | | | | | | Women | | | | | |
| Rank | Name | Qualification | | Semi-Final | Final | Rank | Name | Qualification | | Semi-Final | Final |
| Rank | Name | R1 | R2 | Semi-Final | Final | Rank | Name | R1 | R2 | Semi-Final | Final |
|---|---|---|---|---|---|---|---|---|---|---|---|
| 1st place, gold medalist(s) | (Japan) Sorato Anraku | TOP | 36+ | 45 | TOP | 1st place, gold medalist(s) | (Slovenia) Janja Garnbret | TOP | TOP | 35+ | TOP |
| 2nd place, silver medalist(s) | (United States) Jesse Grupper | TOP | 36+ | 32+ | 42+ | 2nd place, silver medalist(s) | (Japan) Ai Mori | 43+ | TOP | 35+ | 44+ |
| 3rd place, bronze medalist(s) | (Spain) Alberto Ginés López | TOP | TOP | 25+ | 23 | 3rd place, bronze medalist(s) | (Slovenia) Vita Lukan | 37+ | 33 | 33 | 40+ |
| 4 | (United Kingdom) Toby Roberts | TOP | 14+ | 37+ | 21+ | 4 | (South Korea) Seo Chae-hyun | 42 | 42+ | 34 | 38+ |
| 5 | (Germany) Alexander Megos | TOP | 35+ | 29+ | 21+ | 5 | (Japan) Natsuki Tanii | 43 | 34+ | 34 | 33+ |
| 6 | (France) Yannick Flohé | TOP | 35+ | 31+ | 21 | 6 | (Italy) Laura Rogora | 38 | 42+ | 31+ | 33+ |
| 7 | (France) Sam Avezou | TOP | 33+ | 29+ | 20+ | 7 | (Japan) Nonoha Kume | 33+ | 41 | 31+ | 31+ |
| 8 | (Slovenia) Luka Potočar | TOP | 13+ | 27 | 18+ | 8 | (Slovenia) Mia Krampl | 41+ | 42 | 31+ | 11+ |

== Wujiang, China (September, 22-24) ==
48 men and 45 women attended the event.

In men's, Japan's Sorato Anraku won the final lead World Cup of the 2023 season over compatriots Shion Omata and Taisei Homma.

In women's, Japan's Ai Mori won the gold. Austria's Jessica Pilz took silver, securing her win the 2023 lead World Cup series. Japan's Natsuki Tanii placed third, her first podium since 2019.

| Men | | | | | | Women | | | | | |
| Rank | Name | Qualification | | Semi-Final | Final | Rank | Name | Qualification | | Semi-Final | Final |
| Rank | Name | R1 | R2 | Semi-Final | Final | Rank | Name | R1 | R2 | Semi-Final | Final |
|---|---|---|---|---|---|---|---|---|---|---|---|
| 1st place, gold medalist(s) | (Japan) Sorato Anraku | 35+ | 40+ | TOP | 39+ | 1st place, gold medalist(s) | (Japan) Ai Mori | TOP | 39+ | TOP | 36+ |
| 2nd place, silver medalist(s) | (Japan) Shion Omata | 33+ | 36+ | 34+ | 30+ | 2nd place, silver medalist(s) | (Austria) Jessica Pilz | 37+ | 32 | 34 | 31+ |
| 3rd place, bronze medalist(s) | (Japan) Taisei Homma | 34 | TOP | TOP | 26+ | 3rd place, bronze medalist(s) | (Japan) Natsuki Tanii | TOP | 33+ | TOP | 26+ |
| 4 | (Japan) Yoshiyuki Ogata | 26+ | 31+ | 34+ | 26+ | 4 | (China) Zhang Yuetong | 33 | 26+ | 28+ | 22+ |
| 5 | (South Korea) Song Yunchan | 31 | 31 | 42+ | 24+ | 5 | (Japan) Futaba Ito | 33+ | 32+ | 28+ | 22 |
| 6 | (Japan) Ao Yurikusa | 31+ | 25+ | 38+ | 23+ | 6 | (Japan) Miho Nonaka | 33 | 33+ | 28+ | 21+ |
| 7 | (Switzerland) Sascha Lehmann | 29+ | 38+ | 38+ | 23 | 7 | (South Korea) Jain Kim | 36+ | 35+ | 34 | 20+ |
| 8 | (Belgium) Nicolas Collin | 26+ | 30+ | 37+ | 23 | 8 | (France) Manon Hily | 16+ | 28+ | 28+ | 17+ |
