= Lead Japan Cup 2023 =

Annual competition climbing event

- Venue: Matsuyamashita Park General Gymnasium
- Location: Inzai, Chiba, Japan
- Date: 25 – 26 February 2023
- Website: https://www.jma-climbing.org/competition/2023/ljc/

Medalists
gold medal	Shion Omata / Ai Mori
silver medal	Neo Suzuki / Natsuki Tanii
bronze medal	Satone Yoshida / Miho Nonaka

The 2023 Lead Japan Cup was the 36th edition of the annual competition lead climbing event organised by the Japan Mountaineering and Sport Climbing Association (JMSCA), held in Matsuyamashita Park General Gymnasium, Inzai.

LJC is the sole selection event for Japan's national lead team. Athletes who place highly at the LJC are eligible to compete in the Lead World Cups, subject to JMSCA's prevailing selection criteria. LJC 2023 was the first domestic lead competition of the 2023 season. 55 men and 54 women competed, with Shion Omata and Ai Mori winning the men's and women's titles respectively.

== Finals ==
=== Men ===
The men's lead finals took place on 26 February 2023.

Rank	Name	Final
1	Shion Omata	38+
2	Neo Suzuki	38+
3	Satone Yoshida	35+
4	Ao Yurikusa	34+
5	Taisei Homma	28+
6	Masahiro Higuchi	26+
7	Sorato Anraku	25+
8	Haruki Uemura	24+

=== Women ===
The women's lead finals took place on 26 February 2023.

Rank	Name	Final
1	Ai Mori	46+
2	Natsuki Tanii	43+
3	Miho Nonaka	36+
4	Futaba Ito	34+
5	Hana Koike	34+
6	Nonoha Kume	28+
7	Miu Kakizaki	1+
8	Hirano Natsumi	1+

== Semifinals ==
=== Men ===
The men's lead semifinals took place on 26 February 2023.

Rank	Name	Semifinal	Notes
1	Sorato Anraku	42+	Q
2	Shion Omata	42	Q
3	Satone Yoshida	42	Q
4	Ao Yurikusa	41+	Q
5	Taisei Homma	40+	Q
6	Masahiro Higuchi	39+	Q
7	Neo Suzuki	39+	Q
8	Haruki Uemura	39+	Q
9	Zento Murashita	39+	
10	Manato Kurashiki	39+	
11	Hidemasa Nishida	39	
12	Meichi Narasaki	37+	
13	Hiroto Shimizu	36+	
14	Tomoa Narasaki	35+	
15	Yoshiyuki Ogata	35+	
16	Ryohei Kameyama	35	
17	Yuji Fujiwaki	34	
18	Taito Nakagami	34	
19	Kaya Otaka	34	
19	Ritsu Kayotani	34	
19	Yuya Kitae	34	
22	Keita Dohi	34	
23	Mahiro Takami	34	
23	Yusuke Sugimoto	34	
25	Sohta Amagasa	33+	
26	Rikuto Inohana	19+	
27	Kisato Wada	18+	
28	Tomoaki Takata	16+	

=== Women ===
The women's lead semifinals took place on 26 February 2023.

Rank	Name	Semifinal	Notes
1	Ai Mori	TOP	Q
2	Natsuki Tanii	38	Q
3	Nonoha Kume	37	Q
4	Miu Kakizaki	34+	Q
5	Futaba Ito	33+	Q
6	Natsumi Hirano	32+	Q
7	Miho Nonaka	32	Q
8	Hana Koike	31+	Q
9	Melody Sekikawa	31+	
10	Risa Ota	31	
11	Ai Takeuchi	29+	
12	Ryu Nakagawa	29+	
13	Tomona Takao	28+	
14	Honoka Oda	28+	
15	Hatsune Takeishi	27	
16	Mashiro Kuzuu	26+	
17	Mei Kotake	24	
18	Miku Ishii	24	
19	Mao Nakamura	22	
20	Mia Aoyagi	21+	
21	Yuki Hiroshige	20	
22	Sana Ogura	16+	
23	Kanna Fujimura	16+	
24	Momoka Miyajima	15+	
25	Anon Matsufuji	15+	
26	Sora Kudo	15	

== Qualifications ==
=== Men ===
The men's lead qualifications took place on 25 February 2023.

Rank	Name	Qualification					Notes
Rank	Name	Route A		Route B		Points	Notes
Rank	Name	Score	Rank	Score	Rank	Points	Notes
1	Sorato Anraku	TOP	1	36+	1	1.94	Q
2	Shion Omata	TOP	1	35+	3	3.87	Q
3	Yuji Fujiwaki	31+	6	36+	1	5.48	Q
4	Taisei Homma	TOP	1	32+	15	6.80	Q
5	Meichi Narasaki	34+	5	34+	12	8.06	Q
6	Tomoa Narasaki	31+	6	35+	3	10.95	Q
6	Masahiro Higuchi	31+	6	35+	3	10.95	Q
6	Hiroto Shimizu	31+	6	35+	3	10.95	Q
6	Satone Yoshida	31+	6	35+	3	10.95	Q
6	Hidemasa Nishida	31+	6	35+	3	10.95	Q
11	Ryohei Kameyama	TOP	1	18	54	11.62	Q
12	Ao Yurikusa	31	35	35+	3	14.49	Q
12	Kisato Wada	31+	6	35	10	14.49	Q
12	Neo Suzuki	31+	6	35	10	14.49	Q
15	Taito Nakagami	31+	6	34+	12	16.12	Q
15	Haruki Uemura	31+	6	34+	12	16.12	Q
17	Zento Murashita	31+	6	32+	15	19.24	Q
17	Kaya Otaka	31+	6	32+	15	19.24	Q
17	Ritsu Kayotani	31+	6	32+	15	19.24	Q
17	Yuya Kitae	31+	6	32+	15	19.24	Q
17	Sohta Amagasa	31+	6	32+	15	19.24	Q
17	Manato Kurashiki	31+	6	32+	15	19.24	Q
17	Takata Tomoaki	31+	6	32+	15	19.24	Q
24	Keita Dohi	31+	6	31	23	21.45	Q
25	Yoshiyuki Ogata	31+	6	29	25	22.36	Q
26	Rikuto Inohana	31+	6	28+	26	23.66	Q
26	Mahiro Takami	31+	6	28+	26	23.66	Q
26	Yusuke Sugimoto	31+	6	28+	26	23.66	Q
29	Shuta Tanaka	31+	6	27	32	25.30	
30	Rei Sugimoto	31+	6	26+	33	26.65	
30	Kento Yamaguchi	31+	6	26+	33	26.65	
30	Isamu Kawabata	31+	6	26+	33	26.65	
30	Hayato Tsuru	31+	6	26+	33	26.65	
30	Ryoei Nukui	31+	6	26+	33	26.65	
35	Rei Kawamata	27	42	30+	24	31.94	
36	Katsura Konishi	29+	38	28+	26	32.83	
37	Kokoro Fujii	31+	6	12+	55	33.17	
38	Ryo Omasa	30	37	27+	31	33.87	
38	Mototaka Ishizu	28	41	28+	26	33.88	
40	Genbu Uehara	29+	38	26+	33	36.97	
41	Junta Sekiguchi	30+	36	25	40	37.95	
42	Reo Matsuoka	29	40	25+	39	39.50	
43	Yamato Suzuki	26+	44	24	42	43.71	
44	Yuichi Iwami	25+	48	24+	41	44.36	
45	Hayato Kobayashi	27	42	22	46	44.46	
46	Hiroto Nishio	26+	44	23	43	44.74	
47	Hiroki Kawakami	26+	44	22	46	46.00	
48	Toru Kofukuda	23+	50	23	43	47.14	
49	Eito Tamiya	26+	44	20	51	48.64	
50	Akihisa Kaji	18+	55	23	43	49.19	
51	Yo Masuda	22+	52	21+	48	50.22	
52	Shuma Yamane	25	49	20	51	50.48	
53	Tatsuhiro Yoshioka	22	53	21+	48	50.70	
54	Shota Furukawa	23+	50	20	51	51.24	
55	Akira Naiki	20+	54	20+	50	51.96	

=== Women ===
The women's lead qualifications took place on 25 February 2023.

Rank	Name	Qualification					Notes
Rank	Name	Route A		Route B		Points	Notes
Rank	Name	Score	Rank	Score	Rank	Points	Notes
1	Ai Mori	TOP	1	TOP	1	1.41	Q
2	Natsuki Tanii	35+	2	TOP	1	2.00	Q
3	Natsumi Hirano	31	7	TOP	1	3.87	Q
4	Nonoha Kume	33+	3	38	5	4.18	Q
5	Mao Nakamura	33+	3	37+	6	4.77	Q
6	Miho Nonaka	33	5	37+	6	5.98	Q
7	Futaba Ito	33	5	36+	10	7.78	Q
8	Ai Takeuchi	30+	9	37	8	8.99	Q
9	Risa Ota	25+	15	38+	4	9.06	Q
10	Ryu Nakagawa	31	7	35	14	10.61	Q
11	Mashiro Kuzuu	30+	9	35+	13	11.11	Q
12	Natsumi Hirano	25+	15	36+	10	15.02	Q
13	Momoka Miyajima	26	13	33+	18	15.80	Q
14	Miku Ishii	25+	15	35	14	17.54	Q
14	Miu Kakizaki	25+	15	35	14	17.54	Q
16	Tomona Takao	25	27	36+	10	17.86	Q
17	Sana Ogura	15+	43	37	8	19.12	Q
18	Yuki Hiroshige	25+	15	33	20	20.25	Q
19	Kanna Fujimura	27	12	26+	36	21.07	Q
20	Melody Sekikawa	25+	15	31	22	21.24	Q
21	Honoka Oda	18+	11	24+	41	21.62	Q
22	Mia Aoyagi	25+	15	30+	23	22.64	Q
22	Anon Matsufuji	25+	15	30+	23	22.64	Q
24	Hatsune Takeishi	25	27	33+	18	23.16	Q
25	Mao Nakamura	25+	15	29+	28	23.96	Q
26	Sora Kudo	25+	15	27+	30	25.81	Q
27	Kiki Matsuda	25	27	30+	23	26.93	
28	Yuno Harigae	26	13	9	54	27.00	
29	Nanako Kura	25+	15	26	39	28.28	
30	Michika Nagashima	13+	44	34+	17	28.71	
31	Nao Mori	25+	15	24+	41	29.52	
32	Serika Okawachi	23	36	30+	23	30.21	
32	Moe Takiguchi	23	36	30+	23	30.21	
34	Yuka Higuchi	25	27	27+	30	30.70	
35	Sawa Kakizawa	13+	44	31+	21	31.91	
36	Mio Nukui	24+	32	27+	30	32.50	
37	Yuna Suzuki	24	34	27+	30	33.24	
38	Miu Kurita	23+	35	27+	30	33.73	
39	Souka Hasegawa	24+	32	26+	36	34.68	
40	Ayane Kashiwa	25	27	24+	41	35.11	
41	Ichika Osawa	22	50	27+	30	36.06	
42	Kazuki Hagiwara	13+	44	28	29	37.50	
43	Nana Goto	21+	41	24+	41	41.74	
44	Miro Tsumashima	22+	38	23+	45	42.08	
45	Mishika Ishii	22+	38	21	48	42.99	
46	Minami Kondo	17	42	23+	45	43.95	
47	Kazune Kobayashi	13+	44	25	40	44.05	
48	Sora Ito	13	54	26+	36	44.70	
49	Tsukushi Yamauchi	13+	44	23+	45	47.23	
50	Kokoro Takata	13+	44	20	49	48.75	
51	Asami Harada	13+	44	18+	50	49.24	
52	Utaha Sasaki	13+	44	17+	51	49.98	
52	Kiho Nanba	13+	44	17+	51	49.98	
54	Haruka Nakano	13+	44	16+	53	50.70	
