= Lead climbing at the 2024 IFSC Climbing World Cup =

- Location: Wujiang, China; Innsbruck, Austria; Chamonix, France; Briançon, France; Koper, Slovenia; Seoul, South Korea
- Dates: 12 April – 6 October 2024

Champions
- Men: (United Kingdom) Toby Roberts
- Women: (Austria) Jessica Pilz

Competition lead climbing at the 2024 IFSC Climbing World Cup was held over six stages at six different locations, from 12 April to 6 October 2025. The top three in each competition received medals, and at the end of the season, the overall winners were awarded trophies. The overall winners were determined based upon points, which athletes were awarded for finishing in the top 40 of each event. Toby Roberts won the men's season title, Jessica Pilz won the women's season title, and Japan won the national team title.

== Overview ==
Date	Location	Routesetters*	Men	Women
April, 12-14	Wujiang, China	(Japan) **Hiroshi Okano**; (France) Vincent De Girolamo; (Italy) Stefan Scarperi	(United Kingdom) Toby Roberts	(Slovenia) Janja Garnbret
June, 26-30	Innsbruck, Austria	(United Kingdom) **Yann Genoux**; (Austria) Florian Murnig; (Italy) Jacopo Larcher	(Austria) Jakob Schubert	(Slovenia) Janja Garnbret
July, 12-14	Chamonix, France	(United Kingdom) **Yann Genoux**; (France) Romain Cabessut; (France) Vincent De Girolamo	(United States) Colin Duffy	(Japan) Ai Mori
July, 17-19	Briançon, France	(Germany) **Christian Bindhammer**; (Iran) Artimes Farshad Yeganeh; (United States) Ryan Sewell	(Japan) Zento Murashita	(Japan) Mei Kotake
September, 6-7	Koper, Slovenia	(Japan) **Hiroshi Okano**; (United Kingdom) Yann Genoux; (United States) Ryan Sewell	(United Kingdom) Toby Roberts	(Slovenia) Janja Garnbret
October, 2-6	Seoul, South Korea	(France) **Julien Gras**; (Austria) Matthias Woitzuck; (Italy) Jacopo Larcher	(Japan) Sorato Anraku	(Austria) Jessica Pilz
**OVERALL WINNERS**			(United Kingdom) **Toby Roberts**	(Austria) **Jessica Pilz**
**NATIONAL TEAM**			**Japan**	

* Chief routesetters are in bold.

== Overall ranking ==
The overall ranking is determined based upon points, which athletes are awarded for finishing in the top 40 of each individual event. There are six competitions in the season, but only the best five attempts are counted. The national ranking is the sum of the points of that country's three best male and female athletes. Results displayed in parentheses are not counted.

=== Men ===
The results of the twenty most successful athletes of the Lead World Cup 2024:

Rank	Name	Points	Wujiang	Innsbruck	Chamonix	Briançon	Koper	Seoul
1	(United Kingdom) Toby Roberts	3380	1. 1000	3. 690	3. 690	-	1. 1000	-
2	(Japan) Shion Omata	2915	9. 380	16. (220)	5. 545	3. 690	4. 610	3. 690
3	(Japan) Sorato Anraku	2845	3. 690	10. 350	-	-	2. 805	1. 1000
4	(Japan) Zento Murashita	2665	4. 610	11. 325	9. 380	1. 1000	10. 350	11. (325)
5	(France) Sam Avezou	2330	12. 290	-	2. 805	-	3. 690	5. 545
6	(Japan) Taisei Homma	2140	2. 805	6. 495	17. 205	16. 220	25. (95)	8. 415
7	(Japan) Satone Yoshida	2080	11. 325	12. 300	12. 300	2. 805	20. (155)	10. 350
8	(Switzerland) Sascha Lehmann	2040	5. 545	9. 380	7. 455	-	9. 380	13. 280
9	(Japan) Shuta Tanaka	1960	7. 455	5. 545	31. (42)	7. 455	17. 205	12. 300
10	(United States) Colin Duffy	1765	20. 155	4. 610	1. 1000	-	-	-
11	(Japan) Ao Yurikusa	1730	12. 290	17. (205)	11. 325	13. 280	7. 455	9. 380
12	(France) Max Bertone	1690	-	19. 170	14. 260	4. 610	6. 495	20. 155
13	(South Korea) Lee Dohyun	1440	16. 220	-	-	-	8. 415	2. 805
14	(Japan) Yuta Imaizumi	1420	21. 145	24. 105	28. 63	8. 415	12. 300	7. 455
15	(South Korea) Kibeom Kwon	1345	-	20. 155	13. 280	11. 325	11. 325	14. 260
16	(Japan) Yoshiyuki Ogata	1303	19. 170	35. (25.5)	27. 73	9. 380	18. 185	6. 495
17	(Italy) Filip Schenk	1095	18. 185	18. 185	24. (105)	17. 205	13. 280	15. 240
18	(Italy) Stefano Ghisolfi	1090	22. 130	14. 260	10. 350	10. 350	-	-
18	(Switzerland) Jonas Utelli	1090	23. 120	7. 455	23. 120	20. 155	15. 240	26. (84)
20	(Austria) Jakob Schubert	1090	-	1. 1000	-	-	-	-

=== Women ===
The results of the twenty most successful athletes of the Lead World Cup 2024:

Rank	Name	Points	Wujiang	Innsbruck	Chamonix	Briançon	Koper	Seoul
1	(Austria) Jessica Pilz	3220	-	4. 610	2. 805	-	2. 805	1. 1000
2	(Slovenia) Janja Garnbret	3000	1. 1000	1. 1000	-	-	1. 1000	-
3	(Japan) Ai Mori	2610	-	2. 805	1. 1000	-	-	2. 805
4	(South Korea) Seo Chae-hyun	2370	3. 690	3. 690	-	-	9. 380	4. 610
5	(Japan) Mei Kotake	2355	-	16. 220	3. 690	1. 1000	25. 95	10. 350
6	(United States) Anastasia Sanders	2330	-	6. 495	7. 455	-	3. 690	3. 690
7	(Austria) Mattea Pötzi	2315	20. 155	7. 455	6. 495	3. 690	7. 455	16. 220
8	(Italy) Laura Rogora	2235	6. 495	15. 240	-	2. 805	8. 415	13. 280
9	(France) Zelia Avezou	1625	12. 300	-	4. 610	-	5. 545	19. 170
10	(Slovenia) Mia Krampl	1600	8. 415	17. 205	8. 415	-	11. 325	15. 240
11	(Austria) Flora Oblasser	1590	-	10. 350	5. 545	8. 415	13. 280	-
12	(United Kingdom) Erin McNeice	1585	5. 545	-	-	-	6. 495	5. 545
13	(Japan) Natsumi Oda	1453	7. 455	22. 130	10. 350	7. 455	30. (48)	28. 63
14	(France) Hélène Janicot	1340	19. 170	-	13. 270	12. 300	16. 220	9. 380
15	(Japan) Natsuki Tanii	1305	4. 610	23. 120	13. 270	26. (84)	23. 120	18. 185
16	(Slovenia) Rosa Rekar	1291	-	-	29. 56	4. 610	22. 130	6. 495
17	(Bulgaria) Aleksandra Totkova	1280	-	5. 545	15. 240	6. 495	-	-
18	(Australia) Oceania Mackenzie	1272	-	32. 37	11. 325	-	4. 610	12. 300
19	(France) Camille Pouget	1265	-	13. 280	12. 300	15. 240	12. 300	21. 145
20	(China) Luo Zhilu	1220	2. 805	-	-	-	-	8. 415

== Wujiang, China (April, 12-14) ==
60 men and 59 women attended the event.

In the men's, Toby Roberts won the competition ahead of Taisei Homma. In the final, Roberts and Homma received identical scores. Roberts was awarded the gold by virtue of his better semi-final performance. Sorato Anraku won the bronze medal.

In women's, Slovenian Janja Garnbret won the competition — topping all the routes. China's Luo Zhilu finished second, claiming her first lead World Cup medal. South Korea's Seo Chae-hyun placed third.

Men						Women					
Rank	Name	Qualification		Semi-Final	Final	Rank	Name	Qualification		Semi-Final	Final
Rank	Name	R1	R2	Semi-Final	Final	Rank	Name	R1	R2	Semi-Final	Final
1st place, gold medalist(s)	(United Kingdom) Toby Roberts	TOP	TOP	45+	36+	1st place, gold medalist(s)	(Slovenia) Janja Garnbret	TOP	TOP	TOP	TOP
2nd place, silver medalist(s)	(Japan) Taisei Homma	TOP	TOP	31+	36+	2nd place, silver medalist(s)	(China) Luo Zhilu	TOP	TOP	40+	44+
3rd place, bronze medalist(s)	(Japan) Sorato Anraku	TOP	TOP	44+	32+	3rd place, bronze medalist(s)	(South Korea) Seo Chae-hyun	39+	TOP	38+	43+
4	(Japan) Zento Murashita	28+	38+	31	24+	4	(Japan) Natsuki Tanii	37+	41+	39+	40
5	(Switzerland) Sascha Lehmann	28+	38+	31+	24	5	(United Kingdom) Erin McNeice	37+	37+	37	39
6	(Belgium) Hannes Van Duysen	28+	37+	31+	24	6	(Italy) Laura Rogora	TOP	TOP	42+	34+
7	(Japan) Shuta Tanaka	27+	36	32+	23+	7	(Japan) Natsumi Oda	37+	41	40+	34+
8	(United Kingdom) Maximillian Milne	24+	33	32+	23+	8	(Slovenia) Mia Krampl	37+	35	34+	34+
9	(Japan) Shion Omata	28+	38+	31	21+						

== Innsbruck, Austria (June, 26-30) ==
88 men and 78 women attended the event.

In men's, last year's winner Sascha Lehmann failed to advance past the semi-finals. Austrian Jakob Schubert won the competition — his first Innsbruck lead World Cup win since 2021. Germany's Alexander Megos and Great Britain's Toby Roberts claimed silver and bronze respectively.

In women's, identical final and semi-final scores led to count-back to the qualifiers to determine first and second place. Eventually, Slovenia's Janja Garnbret took the win, clipping the final quickdraw to top the final route. Japan's Ai Mori and South Korea's Seo Chae-hyun placed second and third respectively.

Men						Women					
Rank	Name	Qualification		Semi-Final	Final	Rank	Name	Qualification		Semi-Final	Final
Rank	Name	R1	R2	Semi-Final	Final	Rank	Name	R1	R2	Semi-Final	Final
1st place, gold medalist(s)	(Austria) Jakob Schubert	40+	37+	49+	45	1st place, gold medalist(s)	(Slovenia) Janja Garnbret	TOP	48+	48+	TOP
2nd place, silver medalist(s)	(Germany) Alexander Megos	41+	34+	49+	42+	2nd place, silver medalist(s)	(Japan) Ai Mori	49+	48+	48+	TOP
3rd place, bronze medalist(s)	(United Kingdom) Toby Roberts	42	32+	46+	41+	3rd place, bronze medalist(s)	(South Korea) Seo Chae-hyun	43	42+	35+	36
4	(United States) Colin Duffy	31+	33+	44+	40+	4	(Austria) Jessica Pilz	39+	46+	43+	22+
5	(Japan) Shuta Tanaka	37+	35+	43	34+	5	(Bulgaria) Aleksandra Totkova	34	40	40+	22+
6	(Japan) Taisei Homma	40+	34+	46+	29	6	(United States) Anastasia Sanders	43	43+	35	22+
7	(Switzerland) Jonas Utelli	36+	36+	44+	29	7	(Austria) Mattea Pötzi	37+	42+	34+	22+
8	(Japan) Tomoa Narasaki	36+	32	43	28+	8	(China) Yuetong Zhang	37+	42	35+	21+

== Chamonix, France (July, 12-14) ==
68 men and 63 women attended the event.

In men's, USA's Colin Duffy climbed second in the final, setting the high point for the other finalists. The other finalists failed to match or surpass his high point, allowing Duffy to win ahead of France's Sam Avezou and Great Britain's Toby Roberts who won silver and bronze respectively.

In women's, Japan's Ai Mori and Austria's Jessica Pilz both topped the final route. First and second placed on the podium were determined by countback to the semi-finals. Mori won ahead of Pilz due to her superior semi-final performance. Japan's Mei Kotake claimed her first World Cup bronze medal.

Men						Women					
Rank	Name	Qualification		Semi-Final	Final	Rank	Name	Qualification		Semi-Final	Final
Rank	Name	R1	R2	Semi-Final	Final	Rank	Name	R1	R2	Semi-Final	Final
1st place, gold medalist(s)	(United States) Colin Duffy	38+	37+	35+	42+	1st place, gold medalist(s)	(Japan) Ai Mori	TOP	TOP	45+	TOP
2nd place, silver medalist(s)	(France) Sam Avezou	TOP	TOP	40+	41+	2nd place, silver medalist(s)	(Austria) Jessica Pilz	TOP	TOP	43+	TOP
3rd place, bronze medalist(s)	(United Kingdom) Toby Roberts	TOP	TOP	TOP	39	3rd place, bronze medalist(s)	(Japan) Mei Kotake	TOP	TOP	35+	44+
4	(Spain) Alberto Ginés López	TOP	TOP	41	38+	4	(France) Zélia Avezou	42+	43+	35+	44+
5	(Japan) Shion Omata	TOP	TOP	40+	38+	5	(Austria) Flora Oblasser	40+	35+	38	42+
6	(Czech Republic) Adam Ondra	TOP	TOP	40+	37+	6	(Austria) Mattea Pötzi	41+	TOP	35+	42+
7	(Switzerland) Sascha Lehmann	38+	38+	35+	36+	7	(United States) Anastasia Sanders	36+	TOP	40	41+
8	(Spain) Guillermo Peinado Franganillo	38+	TOP	34	31+	8	(Slovenia) Mia Krampl	39+	TOP	35+	41+

== Briançon, France (July, 17-19) ==
59 men and 60 women attended the event.

In men's, the Japanese team swept the podium. Zento Murashita claimed the win, Satone Yoshida placed second, and Shion Omata placed third. In the semi-final, Murashita, Yoshida and Omata all managed to top the men's lead route. Murashita had never been on a World Cup podium before.

In women's, Japan's Mei Kotake was the only athlete to top both qualification routes. Kotake's strong performance in the final allowed her to claim her first World Cup win 11 years after her World Cup debut. Italy's Laura Rogora placed second and Austria's Mattea Pötzi placed third, her first podium finish at the lead World Cup.

Men						Women					
Rank	Name	Qualification		Semi-Final	Final	Rank	Name	Qualification		Semi-Final	Final
Rank	Name	R1	R2	Semi-Final	Final	Rank	Name	R1	R2	Semi-Final	Final
1st place, gold medalist(s)	(Japan) Zento Murashita	35+	35	TOP	47+	1st place, gold medalist(s)	(Japan) Mei Kotake	TOP	TOP	39+	49+
2nd place, silver medalist(s)	(Japan) Satone Yoshida	35+	38+	TOP	45	2nd place, silver medalist(s)	(Italy) Laura Rogora	44+	41+	41+	45
3rd place, bronze medalist(s)	(Japan) Shion Omata	TOP	38+	TOP	42+	3rd place, bronze medalist(s)	(Austria) Mattea Pötzi	37+	8+	41+	42+
4	(France) Max Bertone	32+	33+	47	42+	4	(Slovenia) Rosa Rekar	34+	36+	39	41+
5	(Germany) Sebastian Halenke	32+	35	45	42+	5	(South Korea) Kim Ja-in	TOP	37+	40+	39+
6	(Japan) Mototaka Ishizu	32+	35	46+	41+	6	(Bulgaria) Aleksandra Totkova	34	37+	39+	39+
7	(Japan) Shuta Tanaka	33	30+	48+	39	7	(Japan) Natsumi Oda	37	26+	39+	29+
8	(Japan) Yuta Imaizumi	32+	33+	45+	38+	8	(Austria) Flora Oblasser	35+	35+	38+	27+

== Koper, Slovenia (September, 6-7) ==
58 men and 58 women attended the event.

In men's Great Britain's Toby Roberts, having just won the Olympic champion title in August, climbed closest to the top of the route, securing the win. Olympic silver medallist Sorato Anraku took second place and France's Sam Avezou took third.

In women's, 2-time Olympic champion Janja Garnbret topped the qualification and semi-final routes, dominated the final route — claiming the win. Olympic bronze medallist Jessica Pilz finished second and American Anastasia Sanders took third.

Men						Women					
Rank	Name	Qualification		Semi-Final	Final	Rank	Name	Qualification		Semi-Final	Final
Rank	Name	R1	R2	Semi-Final	Final	Rank	Name	R1	R2	Semi-Final	Final
1st place, gold medalist(s)	(United Kingdom) Toby Roberts	44+	38	40+	40	1st place, gold medalist(s)	(Slovenia) Janja Garnbret	TOP	TOP	TOP	46+
2nd place, silver medalist(s)	(Japan) Sorato Anraku	44+	41+	41+	35	2nd place, silver medalist(s)	(Austria) Jessica Pilz	42+	43+	43+	40+
3rd place, bronze medalist(s)	(France) Sam Avezou	42+	33	32	31+	3rd place, bronze medalist(s)	(United States) Anastasia Sanders	48+	45+	39	39+
4	(Japan) Shion Omata	44+	36+	33+	30+	4	(Australia) Oceania Mackenzie	41+	32+	40+	38+
5	(Germany) Yannick Flohé	36+	24+	33+	30+	5	(France) Zélia Avezou	37+	35	37+	37+
6	(France) Max Bertone	36	35+	28+	25+	6	(United Kingdom) Erin McNeice	41+	35	37+	34+
7	(Japan) Ao Yurikusa	40+	36+	28+	16	7	(Austria) Mattea Pötzi	35+	34+	38+	32+
8	(South Korea) Lee Dohyun	44+	35+	27	12+	8	(Italy) Laura Rogora	37+	45+	46+	19+

== Seoul, South Korea (October, 2-6) ==
55 men and 50 women attended the event.

In men's, Japan's Sorato Anraku won the final lead World Cup of the 2024 season over South Korea's Lee Dohyun. Anraku and Lee had identical scores in the final. Anraku placed higher than Lee by virtue of his better semi-final score. Shion Omata placed third.

In women's, Austria's Jessica Pilz won the gold. Pilz's win in Seoul also secured her win in the 2024 lead World Cup series. Japan's Ai Mori claimed second and USA's Anastasia Sanders placed third.

Men						Women					
Rank	Name	Qualification		Semi-Final	Final	Rank	Name	Qualification		Semi-Final	Final
Rank	Name	R1	R2	Semi-Final	Final	Rank	Name	R1	R2	Semi-Final	Final
1st place, gold medalist(s)	(Japan) Sorato Anraku	45+	34+	43+	45+	1st place, gold medalist(s)	(Austria) Jessica Pilz	TOP	TOP	37+	48
2nd place, silver medalist(s)	(South Korea) Lee Dohyun	45	33+	36	45+	2nd place, silver medalist(s)	(Japan) Ai Mori	TOP	TOP	44	46
3rd place, bronze medalist(s)	(Japan) Shion Omata	TOP	34+	36	35	3rd place, bronze medalist(s)	(United States) Anastasia Sanders	47	TOP	43	45
4	(France) Paul Jenft	43+	32	36	34+	4	(South Korea) Seo Chae-hyun	TOP	TOP	34+	44+
5	(France) Sam Avezou	45	35	35+	34+	5	(China) Erin McNeice	TOP	TOP	41	43
6	(Japan) Ogata Yoshiyuki	34+	33+	36	32+	6	(Slovenia) Rosa Rekar	41+	38+	35+	39
7	(Japan) Yuta Imaizumi	38+	34+	36	26+	7	(China) Yuetong Zhang	TOP	TOP	34+	30+
8	(Japan) Taisei Homma	41+	35	36+	23	8	(China) Luo Zhilu	42+	TOP	34+	30
