= Lead Japan Cup 2026 =

Annual competition climbing event

- Venue: DMG MORI Arena
- Location: Iga, Mie, Japan
- Date: 7 – 8 March 2026
- Website: https://www.jma-climbing.org/competition/2026/ljc/

Medalists
gold medal	Neo Suzuki / Ai Mori
silver medal	Shion Omata / Miho Nonaka
bronze medal	Sorato Anraku / Hana Koike

The 2026 Lead Japan Cup is the 39th edition of the annual competition lead climbing event organised by the Japan Mountaineering and Sport Climbing Association (JMSCA), held in DMG MORI Arena, Mie.

LJC is the sole selection event for Japan's national lead team. Athletes who place highly at the LJC are eligible to compete in the Lead World Cups, subject to JMSCA's prevailing selection criteria. LJC 2026 was the first domestic lead competition of the 2026 season. 54 men and 50 women competed, with Neo Suzuki and Ai Mori winning the men's and women's titles respectively. Neo Suzuki won his first LJC and Ai Mori secured her seventh consecutive LJC title.

== Finals ==
=== Men ===
The men's lead finals took place on 8 March 2026.

Rank	Name	Final
1	Neo Suzuki	34+
2	Shion Omata	34+
3	Sorato Anraku	33
4	Zento Murashita	28
5	Ao Yurikusa	26+
6	Hiroto Nishio	22+
7	Manato Kurashiki	22
8	Ryusei Hamada	5

=== Women ===
The women's lead finals took place on 8 March 2026.

Rank	Name	Final
1	Ai Mori	48+
2	Miho Nonaka	39+
3	Hana Koike	39
4	Natsumi Oda	35+
5	Ryu Nakagawa	27+
6	Mia Aoyagi	27+
7	Yuno Harigae	27+
8	Mei Kotake	27+

== Semifinals ==
=== Men ===
The men's lead semifinals took place on 8 March 2026.

Rank	Name	Semifinal	Notes
1	Sorato Anraku	40+	Q
2	Neo Suzuki	39+	Q
3	Shion Omata	35+	Q
4	Ryusei Hamada	34+	Q
5	Ao Yurikusa	34+	Q
6	Manato Kurashiki	34+	Q
7	Zento Murashita	32+	Q
8	Hiroto Nishio	31+	Q
9	Haru Funaki	30+	
10	Rikuto Inohana	29+	
11	Hiroto Shimizu	28	
12	Taisei Homma	26+	
13	Hareru Nagamori	26+	
14	Kokoro Fujii	25+	
15	Satoki Tanaka	25+	
16	Masahiro Higuchi	25+	
17	Ryota Toda	25+	
18	Satone Yoshida	25	
19	Rei Sasaki	24+	
20	Hidemasa Nishida	24+	
21	Yusuke Sugimoto	24+	
22	Genbu Uehara	24+	
23	Kaede Fujita	22+	
24	Yuta Imaizumi	17+	

=== Women ===
The women's lead semifinals took place on 8 March 2026.

Rank	Name	Semifinal	Notes
1	Ai Mori	39+	Q
2	Ryu Nakagawa	38+	Q
3	Hana Koike	36+	Q
4	Natsumi Oda	35	Q
5	Mia Aoyagi	29+	Q
6	Yuno Harigae	28+	Q
7	Mei Kotake	28+	Q
7	Miho Nonaka	28+	Q
9	Mai Kobayashi	28+	
10	Kohana Mugishima	27+	
11	Hirano Natsumi	26+	
11	Natsuki Tanii	26+	
13	Tomona Takao	26+	
14	Miu Kakizaki	26+	
15	Moka Mochizuki	25+	
16	Towako Nakata	25+	
17	Risa Ota	25+	
18	Nanako Kura	25+	
19	Shiori Murasugi	22+	
20	Karino Nagi	22+	
21	Manami Yama	21+	
22	Serika Okawachi	21	
23	Karin Yokomichi	20	
24	Ai Takeuchi	20	

== Qualifications ==
=== Men ===
The men's lead qualifications took place on 7 March 2026.

Rank	Name	Qualification					Notes
Rank	Name	Route A		Route B		Points	Notes
Rank	Name	Score	Rank	Score	Rank	Points	Notes
1	Neo Suzuki	35+	1	TOP	1	1.41	Q
2	Sorato Anraku	33+	3	TOP	1	3.32	Q
2	Shion Omata	33+	3	TOP	1	3.32	Q
4	Hiroto Shimizu	34	2	34+	7	4.36	Q
5	Ryusei Hamada	33+	3	35+	5	5.50	Q
6	Ao Yurikusa	32+	9	35+	6	7.04	Q
7	Zento Murashita	33+	3	34+	7	7.23	Q
7	Hiroto Nishio	33+	3	34+	7	7.23	Q
7	Yuta Imaizumi	33+	3	34+	7	7.23	Q
10	Manato Kurashiki	27+	18	36+	4	8.94	Q
11	Kokoro Fujii	28+	14	34+	7	12.13	Q
12	Taisei Homma	31	10	32+	15	12.55	Q
13	Satoki Tanaka	31	10	31+	16	13.75	Q
14	Satone Yoshida	28+	14	34	13	14.47	Q
15	Hareru Nagamori	29	13	31+	16	15.30	Q
16	Haru Funaki	29+	12	29+	21	16.25	Q
17	Rei Sasaki	27+	18	34	13	16.43	Q
18	Rikuto Inohana	22	33	34+	7	18.10	Q
19	Masahiro Higuchi	28+	14	29+	21	18.47	Q
20	Hidemasa Nishida	27+	18	31+	16	18.97	Q
21	Ryota Toda	27+	18	27+	25	23.02	Q
22	Kaede Fujita	23+	29	31+	16	23.24	Q
22	Yusuke Sugimoto	23+	29	31+	16	23.24	Q
24	Genbu Uehara	25	25	29+	21	23.45	Q
25	Yuji Fujiwaki	27+	18	27	29	24.08	
26	Akira Shimizu	24	28	28+	24	25.92	
27	Taito Nakagami	28+	14	21+	46	27.13	
28	Kota Miyagawa	24+	26	26+	30	28.20	
28	Shuto Matsusawa	23+	29	27+	25	28.20	
30	Kaya Otaka	24+	26	26	31	28.89	
31	Shuma Yamane	26+	23	23+	33	28.97	
32	Akira Tsunoda	25+	24	23+	33	29.60	
33	Rui Funakoshi	22	33	27+	25	30.24	
34	Kento Yamaguchi	23	32	23+	33	34.18	
35	Ryotaro Nakajima	18	39	26	31	35.27	
36	Sora Harada	22	33	23+	33	35.49	
37	Shoya Arakawa	19	38	23+	33	37.24	
38	Ikken Uehara	12+	51	27+	25	37.30	
39	Keisetsu Onishi	16+	42	23+	33	39.39	
40	Takumi Tsujimoto	15+	44	23+	33	40.30	
41	Kosei Aoyama	21	37	21+	46	41.92	
42	Mototaka Ishizu	13+	48	23+	33	42.29	
43	Miyake Soju	17+	41	22+	43	42.47	
44	Shuta Tanaka	22	33	11+	54	43.16	
45	Yoshioka Tatsuhiro	18	39	20	50	44.44	
46	Haryuoshi Morimoto	15	46	22+	43	44.99	
47	Toku Higashiguchi	13+	48	23	41	45.09	
48	Taisei Funaki	14+	47	22+	43	45.48	
49	Rinze Masuda	12+	51	23	41	46.68	
50	Yuki Takayanagi	16+	42	14+	52	47.01	
51	Arata Sakamoto	13+	48	21+	46	48.24	
52	Yuichi Iwami	15+	44	13+	53	48.56	
53	Shintaro Takeshita	12+	51	21+	46	49.94	
54	Kaede Koga	12+	51	15	51	51.74	

=== Women ===
The women's lead qualifications took place on 7 March 2026.

Rank	Name	Qualification					Notes
Rank	Name	Route A		Route B		Points	Notes
Rank	Name	Score	Rank	Score	Rank	Points	Notes
1	Ai Mori	TOP	1	TOP	1	1.22	Q
2	Hana Koike	38+	2	TOP	1	3.24	Q
3	Yuno Harigae	38+	2	36+	3	4.95	Q
4	Natsumi Hirano	38+	2	35+	5	7.94	Q
4	Natsuki Tanii	38+	2	35+	5	7.94	Q
4	Shiori Murasugi	38+	2	35+	5	7.94	Q
4	Kohana Mugishima	38+	2	35+	5	7.94	Q
8	Mia Aoyagi	37+	16	36+	3	8.26	Q
9	Moka Mochizuki	38+	2	34+	14	10.25	Q
10	Natsumi Oda	38+	2	33+	17	10.91	Q
11	Tomona Takao	38	13	35+	5	11.22	Q
11	Towako Nakata	38	13	35+	5	11.22	Q
13	Ryu Nakagawa	38+	2	32	22	12.83	Q
13	Miu Kakizaki	38+	2	32	22	12.83	Q
15	Mei Kotake	37+	16	35+	5	13.25	Q
15	Nagi Karino	37+	16	35+	5	13.25	Q
15	Miho Nonaka	37+	16	35+	5	13.25	Q
18	Mai Kobayashi	38+	2	28+	31	14.73	Q
19	Risa Ota	37+	16	34+	14	17.10	Q
20	Manami Yama	37	24	34+	14	18.97	Q
21	Karin Yokomichi	37+	16	32+	18	19.50	Q
21	Nanako Kura	37+	16	32+	18	19.50	Q
23	Ai Takeuchi	37+	16	32	22	21.41	Q
24	Serika Okawachi	38	13	25+	36	22.45	Q
25	Mitsu Yamada	34	29	32+	18	23.78	
26	Sora Kaneki	36+	25	31+	26	26.50	
26	Sawa Kakizaki	36+	25	31+	26	26.50	
26	Kiho Namba	36+	25	31+	26	26.50	
29	Miku Ishii	25	46	32+	18	29.95	
30	Mashiro Kuzuu	30+	39	32	22	30.66	
31	Chihiro Kaneko	33+	30	26+	33	32.48	
31	Akane Matsuura	33+	30	26+	33	32.48	
33	Yuri Horiuchi	31+	38	29+	30	33.76	
34	Kiki Matsuda	32+	34	26	35	34.75	
35	Kana Watanabe	33+	30	23+	38	34.82	
35	Suzu Matoba	33+	30	23+	38	34.82	
37	Sarii Saito	26	43	30	29	35.31	
38	Sumire Yamamoto	35+	28	19+	48	36.85	
39	Koko Masuda	32+	34	21+	44	39.18	
40	Ayaka Kaji	32	36	22	43	39.62	
41	Rin Ninomiya	21	50	27+	32	40.00	
42	Kazune Kobayashi	30+	39	22+	42	40.99	
43	Kokoro Takata	32	36	19+	48	42.07	
44	Airi Sano	20	48	24+	37	42.14	
45	Serina Koyama	25+	44	23	40	42.45	
45	Yuka Higuchi	25+	44	23	40	42.45	
47	Hina Sato	30+	39	20+	46	42.90	
48	Kawa Okawa	29+	42	18+	50	45.83	
49	Kazuki Hagiwara	22	49	21+	44	46.70	
50	Suzu Hasegawa	24+	47	20	47	47.00	
