= Hana Koike =

Japanese competition climber (born 2005)

Personal information
- Nationality: Japanese
- Born: July 5, 2005 (age 21) Saitama, Japan
- Height: 150 cm (4 ft 11 in)

Climbing career
- Type of climber: Competition lead climbing
Medal record
Women's competition climbing
Representing Japan
World Youth Championships
Silver medal – second place	2019 Arco	Lead
Bronze medal – third place	2019 Arco	Boulder

Hana Koike (小池 はな Koike Hana; born July 5, 2005) is a Japanese competition climber who specializes in competition lead climbing.

Koike started climbing on the IFSC Climbing World Cup circuit in 2022. She entered her first Lead semifinals in Innsbruck, placing 21st. Later in September, she narrowly missed the Lead finals in Jakarta, placing 9th.

In 2023, Koike progressed to the semifinals in 4 of the 6 Lead World Cups.

In 2026, Koike returned to Japan's national team and earned the right to compete in the World Climbing Series following a strong performance at the Lead Japan Cup where she won bronze. At the Asian Championships in Meishan, Koike placed 8th. In June 2026, She made her first World Climbing Series Lead final in Prague.

== Rankings ==
=== World Cup ===
Discipline	2022	2023	2026
Lead	27	31	13
Bouldering	59	56	-

=== World Championships ===
Discipline	Moscow 2021
Lead	44
Bouldering	45

=== World Youth Championships ===
Discipline	2019 Youth B
Lead	2
Bouldering	3

=== Asian Championships ===
Discipline	2026
Lead	8

=== Japan Cup ===
Discipline	2019	2020	2021	2022	2023	2025	2026
Lead	8	6	17	9	5	15	3
Bouldering	13	8	13	8	15	-	-

=== Japan Youth Championships ===
Discipline	2017	2018	2019	2020	2021
Lead	2	1	1	3	1
Bouldering	5	1	2	1	-
