= Lead climbing at the 2026 World Climbing Series =

- Location: Wujiang, China; Prague, Czechia; Innsbruck, Austria; Chamonix, France; Koper, Slovenia; Santiago, Chile
- Dates: 8 May – 25 October 2026

Champions
- Men: (Japan) Neo Suzuki
- Women: (United States) Annie Sanders

Competition lead climbing at the 2026 World Climbing Series was held over six stages at six different locations, from 8 May to 25 October. The top three in each competition received medals, and at the end of the season, the overall winners were awarded trophies. The overall winners were determined based upon points, which athletes were awarded for finishing in the top 40 of each event.

== Overview ==
Date	Location	Routesetters*	Men	Women
May, 8-10	Wujiang, China	(Austria) **Martin Hammerer**; (Japan) Akito Matsushima; (France) Julien Gras	(Japan) Neo Suzuki	(United States) Annie Sanders
June, 3-7	(Czech Republic) Prague, Czechia	(Germany) **Christian Bindhammer**; (Poland) Olga Niemiec; (Austria) Jacopo Larcher	(Indonesia) Putra Tri Ramadani	(United States) Annie Sanders
June, 17-21	Innsbruck, Austria	(Poland) **Adam Pustelnik**; (France) Helene Janicot; (China) Ma Zida	(Japan) Neo Suzuki	(Slovenia) Janja Garnbret
July, 10-12	Chamonix, France	(Germany) **Jan Zbranek**; (Spain) Sergio Verdasco; (United States) Brad Weaver	(Spain) Alberto Ginés López	(United States) Annie Sanders
September, 4-5	Koper, Slovenia	(Spain) **Sergio Verdasco**; (United States) Ryan Sewell; (Poland) Adam Pustelnik	(Japan) Neo Suzuki	(Slovenia) Janja Garnbret
October, 23-25	Santiago, Chile	(France) **Romain Cabessut**; (United Kingdom) Yann Genoux; (United States) Ryan Sewell	(Switzerland) Jonas Utelli	(Slovenia) Janja Garnbret
**OVERALL WINNERS**			(Japan) Neo Suzuki	(United States) Annie Sanders
**NATIONAL TEAM**			**Japan**	

* Chief routesetters are in bold.

== Overall ranking ==
The overall ranking is determined based upon points, which athletes are awarded for finishing in the top 40 of each individual event. There are six competitions in the season, but only the best five attempts are counted. The national ranking is the sum of the points of that country's three best male and female athletes. Results displayed in parentheses are not counted.

=== Men ===
The results of the twenty most successful athletes of the Lead World Cup 2026

Rank	Name	Points	Wujiang	Prague	Innsbruck	Chamonix	Koper	Santiago
1	(Japan) Neo Suzuki	4820	1. 1000	2. 805	1. 1000	11. 325	1. 1000	3. 690
2	(Indonesia) Putra Tri Ramadani	4175	9. 380	1. 1000	4. 610	3. 690	3. 690	2. 805
3	(Spain) Alberto Ginés López	3455	2. 805	12. 300	2. 805	1. 1000	22. 130	8. 415
4	(Japan) Satone Yoshida	3155	4. 610	8. 415	14. 260	7. 455	2. 805	4. 610
5	(Japan) Sorato Anraku	2870	5. 545	4. 610	7. 455	8. 415	10. 350	6. 495
6	(France) Sam Avezou	2675	6. 495	9. 380	15. 240	6. 495	4. 610	7. 455
7	(Slovenia) Luka Potočar	2510	10. 350	6. 495	6. 495	2. 805	24. 105	14. 260
8	(South Korea) Lee Dohyun	2415	3. 690	15. 240	9. 380	4. 610	6. 495	-
9	(Italy) Filip Schenk	1910	7. 455	7. 455	20. 155	12. 300	5. 545	-
10	(Austria) Jakob Schubert	1760	-	3. 690	3. 690	9. 380	-	-
11	(Italy) Giovanni Placci	1605	24. 105	13. 280	8. 415	10. 350	7. 455	-
12	(Switzerland) Jonas Utelli	1453	-	27. 73	-	-	9. 380	1. 1000
13	(Japan) Zento Murashita	1399	16. 220	10. 350	36. 24	5. 545	14. 260	-
14	(United States) Jesse Grupper	1189	-	26. 84	12. 300	15. 240	11. 325	15. 240
15	(Switzerland) Sascha Lehmann	1130	20. 155	23. 120	17. 205	21. 145	12. 300	17. 205
16	(Czech Republic) Adam Ondra	1090	-	5. 545	5. 545	-	-	-
17	(United States) Sergey Lakhno	981	26. 84	31. 39.5	10. 350	26. 73.3	26. 84	10. 350
18	(South Korea) Hyunseung Noh	903	13. 280	20. 155	16. 220	49. 8	15. 240	-
19	(Japan) Shion Omata	860	11. 325	16. 220	18. 185	22. 130	-	-
20	(Japan) Ao Yurikusa	841	12. 300	14. 260	37. 21	14. 260	-	-

=== Women ===
The results of the twenty most successful athletes of the Lead World Climbing Series 2026:

Rank	Name	Points	Wujiang	Prague	Innsbruck	Chamonix	Koper	Santiago
1	(United States) Annie Sanders	4415	1. 1000	1. 1000	2. 805	1. 1000	4. 610	-
2	(Slovenia) Janja Garnbret	3805	2. 805	-	1. 1000	-	1. 1000	1. 1000
3	(South Korea) Seo Chae-hyun	3565	3. 690	2. 805	3. 690	3. 690	3. 690	-
4	(Slovenia) Rosa Rekar	2881	5. 545	44. 10.66	5. 545	5. 545	5. 545	3. 690
5	(Austria) Jessica Pilz	2395	12. 300	4. 610	6. 495	6. 495	6. 495	-
6	(France) Zélia Avezou	1900	11. 325	3. 690	19. 170	14. 260	7. 455	-
7	(United Kingdom) Erin McNeice	1830	4. 610	-	4. 610	4. 610	-	-
8	(South Korea) Kim Ja In	1805	16. 220	8. 415	9. 365	7. 455	10. 350	-
9	(Japan) Ryu Nakagawa	1760	10. 350	14. 260	12. 300	23. 120	18. 185	5. 545
10	(United States) Ella Fisher	1739	9. 380	5. 545	22. 130	27. 64	17. 205	8. 415
11	(Slovenia) Lučka Rakovec	1720	17. 205	13. 280	11. 325	20. 155	21. 145	4. 610
12	(Bulgaria) Aleksandra Totkova	1662	-	7. 455	9. 365	2. 805	32. 37	-
13	(Japan) Hana Koike	1559	26. 84	6. 495	17. 205	10. 325	13. 280	19. 170
14	(Czech Republic) Tereza Siruckova	1351	32. 37	9. 380	13. 280	22. 130	26. 69	7. 455
15	(Czech Republic) Michaela Smetanova	1339	18. 185	15. 240	23. 120	27. 64	9. 380	10. 350
16	(Belgium) Heloïse Doumont	1286	28. 63	27. 73	16. 220	17. 205	15. 230	6. 495
17	(Italy) Laura Rogora	1220	8. 415	-	-	-	-	2. 805
17	(Austria) Mattea Pötzi	1220	20. 155	22. 130	20. 155	15. 240	14. 260	13. 280
19	(United States) Brooke Raboutou	1185	-	-	-	9. 380	2. 805	-
20	(South Korea) Chaeyeong Kim	1178	24. 105	12. 300	33. 33	10. 325	8. 415	-

== Wujiang, China (May, 8-10) ==
58 men and 59 women attended the event.

In the men's, last year's winner Sorato Anraku advanced to the final but did not podium at the event. Neo Suzuki entered the finals in 8th, finishing ahead of the finalists to secure victory in the first lead World Climbing series stop of the 2026 season. Alberto Ginés López claimed silver - his fifth overall. Lee Dohyun placed third.

In women's, last year's winner Janja Garnbret finished in second place behind Annie Sanders, falling on the same move in the final round. Countback to the semifinal round differentiated the top two spots. Seo Chae-hyun placed third.

Men						Women					
Rank	Name	Qualification		Semi-Final	Final	Rank	Name	Qualification		Semi-Final	Final
Rank	Name	R1	R2	Semi-Final	Final	Rank	Name	R1	R2	Semi-Final	Final
1st place, gold medalist(s)	(Japan) Neo Suzuki	TOP	TOP	36+	44+	1st place, gold medalist(s)	(United States) Annie Sanders	TOP	TOP	TOP	43+
2nd place, silver medalist(s)	(Spain) Alberto Ginés López	40+	33+	39+	39+	2nd place, silver medalist(s)	(Slovenia) Janja Garnbret	TOP	TOP	38+	43+
3rd place, bronze medalist(s)	(South Korea) Lee Dohyun	37+	36	37+	39+	3rd place, bronze medalist(s)	(South Korea) Seo Chae-hyun	TOP	TOP	40+	30
4	(Japan) Satone Yoshida	TOP	TOP	TOP	38+	4	(United Kingdom) Erin McNeice	TOP	40+	38+	29
5	(Japan) Sorato Anraku	37+	34+	37+	38+	5	(Slovenia) Rosa Rekar	42	39	36	26+
6	(France) Sam Avezou	35+	35+	39+	35+	6	(Australia) Oceania Mackenzie	38+	38+	35+	24+
7	(Italy) Filip Schenk	34+	35+	39+	34+	7	(Slovenia) Lucija Tarkus	39+	40+	38+	22
8	(France) Victor Guillermin	34+	31	38	30	8	(Italy) Laura Rogora	TOP	40+	40+	22

== Prague, Czechia (June, 3-7) ==
76 men and 75 women attended the event.

In men's, Indonesia's Putra Tri Ramadani ascended higher than anyone else on the final route to secure his first World Climbing Series win, becoming the first Indonesian to do so in Lead. Neo Suzuki claimed a second-consecutive podium place while Austria's Jakob Schubert took third.

In women's, USA's Annie Sanders narrowly edged South Korea's Seo Chae-hyun to take the gold. With her double-wins in boulder and lead in Prague, Sanders became only the fourth climber in history to win both boulder and lead at the same World Cup event. Only France's Sandrine Levet, American Colin Duffy and Slovenia's Janja Garnbret had achieved this feat. France's Zélia Avezou took her first podium in Lead, finishing third.

Men						Women					
Rank	Name	Qualification		Semi-Final	Final	Rank	Name	Qualification		Semi-Final	Final
Rank	Name	R1	R2	Semi-Final	Final	Rank	Name	R1	R2	Semi-Final	Final
1st place, gold medalist(s)	(Indonesia) Putra Tri Ramadani	43+	42	37+	43	1st place, gold medalist(s)	(United States) Annie Sanders	TOP	TOP	46+	37
2nd place, silver medalist(s)	(Japan) Neo Suzuki	40+	40+	38+	39	2nd place, silver medalist(s)	(South Korea) Seo Chae-hyun	TOP	TOP	46+	35
3rd place, bronze medalist(s)	(Austria) Jakob Schubert	TOP	40+	37+	37	3rd place, bronze medalist(s)	(France) Zélia Avezou	37+	40+	43+	31+
4	(Japan) Sorato Anraku	TOP	40+	38+	34+	4	(Austria) Jessica Pilz	31	TOP	40+	30
5	(Czech Republic) Adam Ondra	37+	32+	36	30+	5	(United States) Ella Fisher	31	TOP	43+	24+
6	(Slovenia) Luka Potočar	27	35	34	30+	6	(Japan) Hana Koike	37+	37+	41+	24+
7	(Italy) Filip Schenk	33+	37+	33+	29+	7	(Bulgaria) Aleksandra Totkova	TOP	40+	44	18+
8	(Japan) Satone Yoshida	40+	37+	33	2	8	(South Korea) Jain Kim	36+	37	42	14+

== Innsbruck, Austria (June, 17-21) ==
79 men and 80 women attended the event.

In men's, last year's winner Neo Suzuki repeated his win over Spain's Alberto Ginés López, with countback to the semifinal round separating the two medallists. Austria's Jakob Schubert took third, his second podium of the season.

In women's, Janja Garnbret was the only athlete to top a qualification route. In the final, Garnbret surpassed Annie Sanders's high point to claim a convincing victory. This marked Garnbret's 50th gold medal of her career at the World Climbing Series level. Her first being in Chamonix, France, in 2016. Seo Chae-hyun placed third.

Men						Women					
Rank	Name	Qualification		Semi-Final	Final	Rank	Name	Qualification		Semi-Final	Final
Rank	Name	R1	R2	Semi-Final	Final	Rank	Name	R1	R2	Semi-Final	Final
1st place, gold medalist(s)	(Japan) Neo Suzuki	44+	36+	52	42+	1st place, gold medalist(s)	(Slovenia) Janja Garnbret	TOP	44+	43	44
2nd place, silver medalist(s)	(Spain) Alberto Ginés López	47	33+	48	42+	2nd place, silver medalist(s)	(United States) Annie Sanders	46+	34	41	38+
3rd place, bronze medalist(s)	(Austria) Jakob Schubert	47+	36+	39+	42	3rd place, bronze medalist(s)	(South Korea) Seo Chae-hyun	46+	34+	42+	36+
4	(Indonesia) Putra Tri Ramadani	47	36+	39+	40+	4	(United Kingdom) Erin McNeice	36+	34	35+	35+
5	(Czech Republic) Adam Ondra	TOP	36+	37	40+	5	(Slovenia) Rosa Rekar	38+	31+	35+	33
6	(Slovenia) Luka Potočar	47+	43+	36+	38+	6	(Austria) Jessica Pilz	38	35+	42+	25+
7	(Japan) Sorato Anraku	TOP	42	47+	37+	7	(China) Zhang Yuetong	32+	33	35+	20+
8	(Italy) Giovanni Placci	43+	36+	46+	32+	8	(France) Manon Hily	35+	31	35+	12+

== Chamonix, France (July, 10-12) ==
73 men and 81 women attended the event.

In men's, last year's winner Sorato Anraku made it into the final and placed eighth. Spain's Alberto Ginés López claimed his first World Climbing Series gold medal of his career, ending a streak of silver and bronze places. Slovenia's Luka Potočar placed second, his first medal in 4 years. Indonesia's Putra Tri Ramadani claimed bronze.

In women's, USA's Annie Sanders took her third Lead win of the 2026 season, topping both qualification routes and finishing ahead of the field on the final route. Bulgaria's Aleksandra Totkova took silver, her first podium finish since Chamonix in 2021. Seo Chae-hyun placed third, by virtue of her stronger semi-final performance.

Men						Women					
Rank	Name	Qualification		Semi-Final	Final	Rank	Name	Qualification		Semi-Final	Final
Rank	Name	R1	R2	Semi-Final	Final	Rank	Name	R1	R2	Semi-Final	Final
1st place, gold medalist(s)	(Spain) Alberto Ginés López	34+	TOP	37+	39+	1st place, gold medalist(s)	(United States) Annie Sanders	TOP	TOP	48+	52+
2nd place, silver medalist(s)	(Slovenia) Luka Potočar	29+	23+	38+	38+	2nd place, silver medalist(s)	(Bulgaria) Aleksandra Totkova	44+	43+	49+	48
3rd place, bronze medalist(s)	(Indonesia) Putra Tri Ramadani	34+	21+	37+	38+	3rd place, bronze medalist(s)	(South Korea) Seo Chae-hyun	TOP	TOP	51+	47+
4	(South Korea) Lee Dohyun	31+	27+	37+	36+	4	(United Kingdom) Erin McNeice	45+	TOP	45+	47+
5	(Japan) Zento Murashita	29+	32+	35+	35+	5	(Slovenia) Rosa Rekar	45+	40+	45+	47+
6	(France) Sam Avezou	33+	TOP	38	34	6	(Austria) Jessica Pilz	44+	42+	46+	44+
7	(Japan) Satone Yoshida	31	33+	37+	34	7	(South Korea) Jain Kim	41+	TOP	46+	42+
8	(Japan) Sorato Anraku	37+	27+	36+	34	8	(France) Manon Hily	44+	43+	45+	41

== Koper, Slovenia (September, 4-5) ==
71 men and 68 women attended the event.

In the men's, a tough finals route saw slips from medal contenders due to clipping errors. Japan's Neo Suzuki won his third lead World Climbing Series of the season, his fourth overall. Satone Yoshida won silver, marking his first medal of the season. Putra Tri Ramadani claimed bronze, his third podium of the season.

In women's, Janja Garnbret was the only one to top both qualification routes. In the final, a hand slip on a reachy and friction-dependent move nearly handed the victory to Brooke Raboutou. However, Garnbret regain her composure to fight her way up to hold 42+ for the win. Raboutou claimed silver, her first podium at the World Climbing Series level since 2022. Seo Chae-hyun earned her fifth-consecutive medal of the season.

Men						Women					
Rank	Name	Qualification		Semi-Final	Final	Rank	Name	Qualification		Semi-Final	Final
Rank	Name	R1	R2	Semi-Final	Final	Rank	Name	R1	R2	Semi-Final	Final
1st place, gold medalist(s)	(Japan) Neo Suzuki	33+	33+	34+	33+	1st place, gold medalist(s)	(Slovenia) Janja Garnbret	TOP	TOP	45+	42+
2nd place, silver medalist(s)	(Japan) Satone Yoshida	31+	34+	32+	30+	2nd place, silver medalist(s)	(United States) Brooke Raboutou	40+	27+	44+	33
3rd place, bronze medalist(s)	(Indonesia) Putra Tri Ramadani	35+	28	33	28+	3rd place, bronze medalist(s)	(South Korea) Seo Chae-hyun	TOP	35+	45+	32+
4	(France) Sam Avezou	35	31+	32+	23+	4	(United States) Annie Sanders	40+	40	44	32+
5	(Italy) Filip Schenk	33	31+	38+	23	5	(Slovenia) Rosa Rekar	40+	31+	44+	30
6	(South Korea) Lee Dohyun	32+	37+	37+	23	6	(Austria) Jessica Pilz	42+	29+	43+	27
7	(Italy) Giovanni Placci	32	31+	33+	22+	7	(France) Zélia Avezou	39+	30	40+	25
8	(South Korea) Chanjin Jung	31	31	30	22	8	(South Korea) Chaeyeong Kim	39	25+	37+	13+

== Santiago, Chile (October, 23-25) ==
53 men and 48 women attended the event.

In the men's final, Switzerland's Jonas Utelli won his first World Climbing Series, having made finals in previous seasons but never podiumed. Indonesia's Putra Tri Ramadani won silver, marking his fourth podium out of the six World Climbing Series competitions in the season. Japan's Neo Suzuki claimed third and the 2026 lead season title. With his overall victory, Suzuki becomes the fourth Japanese climber to win the Lead Series title, following Yuji Hirayama, Sachi Amma and Sorato Anraku.

In the women's, Janja Garnbret was the only one to top both qualification routes. In the final, Garnbret was the only climber to top the route to claim her 34th Lead World Cup gold. Italy's Laura Rogora claimed silver, her first podium since Koper in 2025. Lead World Championship silver medallist Rosa Rekar took third.

Men						Women					
Rank	Name	Qualification		Semi-Final	Final	Rank	Name	Qualification		Semi-Final	Final
Rank	Name	R1	R2	Semi-Final	Final	Rank	Name	R1	R2	Semi-Final	Final
1st place, gold medalist(s)	(Switzerland) Jonas Utelli	TOP	29+	31+	52	1st place, gold medalist(s)	(Slovenia) Janja Garnbret	TOP	TOP	49+	TOP
2nd place, silver medalist(s)	(Indonesia) Putra Tri Ramadani	40	36+	33+	49	2nd place, silver medalist(s)	(Italy) Laura Rogora	46	34	48	48+
3rd place, bronze medalist(s)	(Japan) Neo Suzuki	47+	36+	32+	47+	3rd place, bronze medalist(s)	(Slovenia) Rosa Rekar	45	40+	48	46+
4	(Japan) Satone Yoshida	36+	34+	31+	41+	4	(Slovenia) Lucka Rakovec	44+	44+	41+	46+
5	(Japan) Ryusei Hamada	8	43+	31+	40+	5	(Japan) Ryu Nakagawa	45+	33	38+	46+
6	(Japan) Sorato Anraku	41	33+	31+	35	6	(Belgium) Heloïse Doumont	46	35+	42	44+
7	(France) Sam Avezou	40+	35+	31+	34+	7	(Czech Republic) Tereza Siruckova	44+	30	37+	38
8	(Spain) Alberto Ginés López	44+	36+	31+	25	8	(United States) Ella Fisher	45	28	38+	37+
