= Neo Suzuki =

Japanese climber

Personal information
- Nationality: Japanese
- Born: 2004 (age 21–22) Shizuoka, Japan
- Height: 163 cm (5 ft 4 in)

Climbing career
- Type of climber: Competition lead climbing
- Known for: 2026 Asian Games Lead Winner
Medal record
Event / 1st / 2nd / 3rd; World Cup / 4 / 2 / 1
Men's competition climbing
Representing Japan
World Cup
Winner	2026	Lead
World Cup (Event)
Gold medal – first place	2026 Koper	Lead
Gold medal – first place	2026 Innsbruck	Lead
Gold medal – first place	2026 Wujiang	Lead
Gold medal – first place	2025 Innsbruck	Lead
Silver medal – second place	2026 Prague	Lead
Silver medal – second place	2025 Wujiang	Lead
Bronze medal – third place	2026 Santiago	Lead
Asian Championships
Gold medal – first place	2026 Meishan	Lead
Asian Games
Gold medal – first place	2026 Aichi-Nagoya	Lead

Neo Suzuki (鈴木 音生 Suzuki Neo) is a Japanese competition climber, specializing in competition lead climbing.

== Competition climbing ==
Suzuki began climbing on the IFSC Climbing World Cup circuit in 2023, advancing to all the lead world cup semifinals in his debut season.

In August 2023, Suzuki won the silver medal at the IFSC Climbing World Youth Championships in Seoul. He continued to have success in the youth competition climbing scene, winning three titles at the IFSC Climbing Asian Youth Championships in the Junior category.

In 2025, Suzuki finished on the podium at the Lead World Cup in Wujiang, collecting a silver medal in his first World Cup final. He won his first Lead World Cup title in Innsbruck.

Suzuki began the 2026 season by winning the Lead Japan Cup. He subsequently claimed the gold medal at the Asian Championship, which also secured his qualification for the 2026 Asian Games. In May, he won his second World Climbing Series title in Wujiang, despite advancing to the final in eighth. He followed this up with a silver medal in Prague in June. At the Innsbruck World Climbing Series, Suzuki secured his third career gold medal, finishing on the podium for the third consecutive time.

In October 2026, he competed at the 2026 Asian Games and won a gold medal in the lead event.

Suzuki finished on the podium in five of the six World Climbing Series Lead events in 2026, winning three gold medals. He secured the overall Lead title, becoming the fourth Japanese man to win the title.

== Rankings ==
=== World Cup ===
Discipline	2023	2025	2026
Lead	19	4	1

=== World Championships ===
Discipline	Seoul 2025
Lead	5

=== World Youth Championships ===
Discipline	2023 Juniors
Lead	2

=== Japan Cup ===
Discipline	2023	2025	2026
Lead	2	2	1
