= Toby Roberts =

British rock climber (born 2005)

Toby Roberts MBE
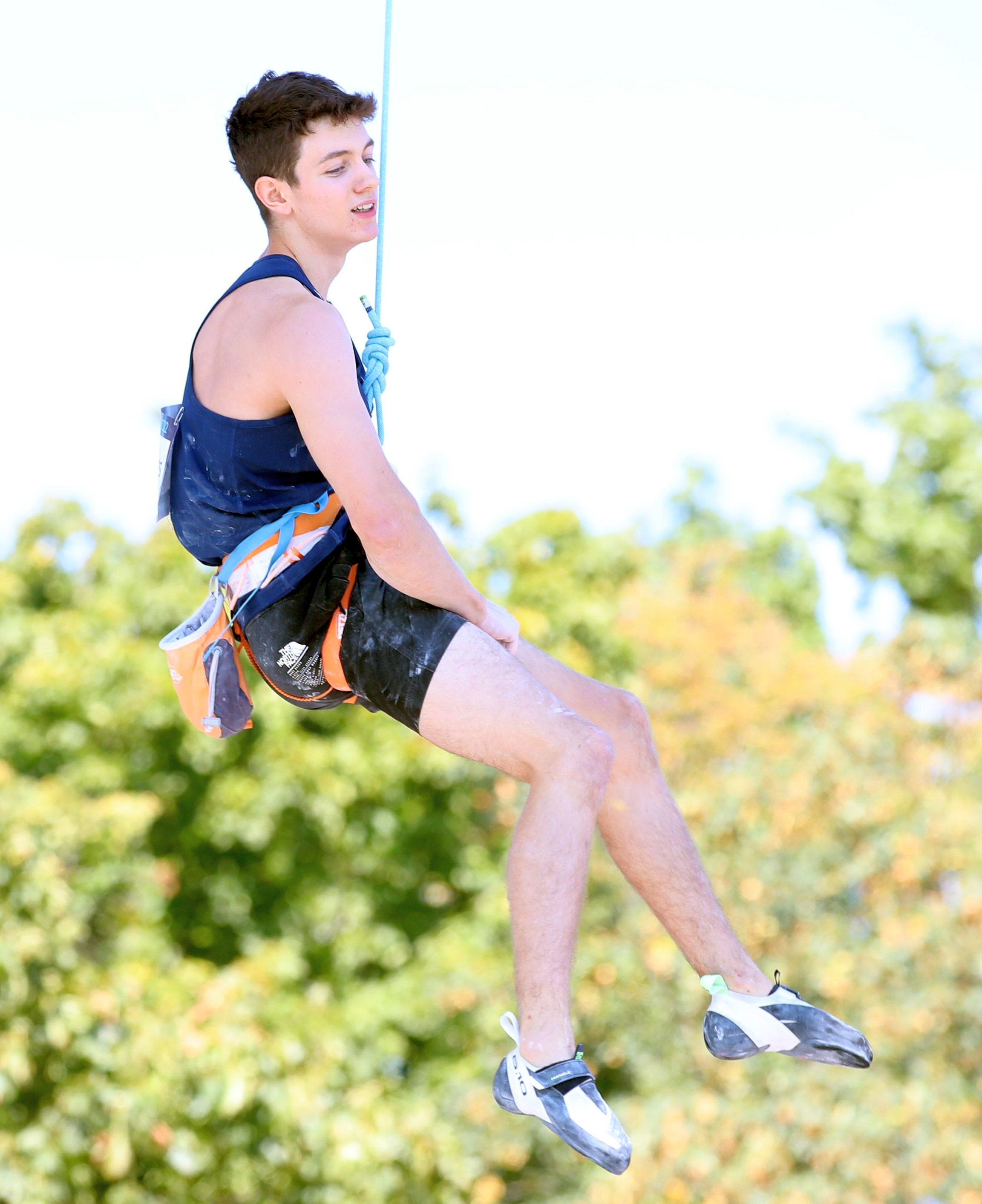
- Roberts in 2022

Personal information
- Full name: Toby Alexander Roberts
- Nationality: English
- Born: 15 March 2005 (age 21) Elstead, Surrey, England
- Education: Edgeborough School, Surrey; King Edward's School, Surrey
- Height: 177 cm (5 ft 10 in)
- Website: tobyroberts.co.uk

Climbing career
- Type of climber: Competition climbing; Sport climbing; Bouldering
- Ape index: +10 cm (4 in)
- Highest grade: Redpoint: 9a+ (5.15a)
- Known for: Youngest Briton to redpoint 8b, 9a, and 9a+; Olympic gold medallist
Medal record
Men's competition climbing
Representing Great Britain
Olympic Games
Gold medal – first place	2024 Paris	Combined
World Cup (Overall)
Winner	2024	Lead
World Cup
Gold medal – first place	2025 Innsbruck	Boulder
Gold medal – first place	2024 Koper	Lead
Gold medal – first place	2024 Wujiang	Lead
Gold medal – first place	2023 Chamonix	Lead
Gold medal – first place	2023 Brixen	Boulder
Silver medal – second place	2025 Innsbruck	Lead
Bronze medal – third place	2025 Koper	Lead
Bronze medal – third place	2024 Prague	Boulder
Bronze medal – third place	2024 Chamonix	Lead
Bronze medal – third place	2024 Innsbruck	Lead
Bronze medal – third place	2023 Salt Lake City	Boulder
Bronze medal – third place	2022 Edinburgh	Lead

Toby Alexander Roberts (born 15 March 2005) is an English rock climber who specialises in competition climbing and outdoor sport climbing. He is the youngest British climber to redpoint a 9a (5.14d)-graded sport climbing route. He is the 2024 Olympic champion in the combined boulder and lead discipline in sport climbing and the 2024 World Cup champion in both lead and combined.

== Early life and education ==
Roberts comes from Elstead, Surrey, the son of Tristian and Marina Roberts.

Roberts attended Edgeborough School, an independent coeducational day preparatory school in Frensham (a village near Farnham) in Surrey, where he was introduced to climbing in 2013, followed by King Edward's School, an independent boarding and day school in Wormley (a village near Witley), also in Surrey.

== Climbing career ==
=== Rock climbing ===
In 2015, at only ten years of age, Roberts redpointed the historic 8a (5.13b) graded British sport climbing route, Raindogs, at Malham Cove in North Yorkshire. In 2020, aged 15, Roberts became the youngest British climber to climb a 9a (5.14d) graded sport route when he redpointed Steve McClure's Rainshadow, also at Malham Cove. In 2021, Roberts became the 12th climber to redpoint Ben Moon's historic sport route, Hubble, at Raven Tor (the world's first 8c+-graded route).

=== Competition climbing ===
Roberts first started competing in international youth competition climbing events in 2019. In 2022, Roberts began his transition towards the international senior competition circuit, winning a bronze medal in lead climbing at the IFSC Climbing World Cup in Edinburgh in September 2022.

In May 2023, Roberts won his first World Cup medal in bouldering with a third-place finish in Salt Lake City. He went on to win his first World Cup gold medal in bouldering with a victory in Brixen in June 2023 followed by his first World Cup gold medal in lead climbing with a victory in Chamonix in July 2023, becoming the first British climber to win a gold medal in both the bouldering and lead climbing disciplines. In October 2023, he became the first male British climber–and the second British climber after Shauna Coxsey–to secure a spot in the Olympics for climbing by winning the 2023 European Qualifier in Laval.

At the 2024 Summer Olympics in Paris, Roberts won a gold medal in the combined bouldering and lead climbing event, becoming the first British climber to win an Olympic medal related to climbing since members of the 1922 British Mount Everest expedition in 1924. Subsequently, he finished first overall in the 2024 Lead World Cup series and first overall in the 2024 Lead rankings and Combined rankings.

Roberts was appointed Member of the Order of the British Empire (MBE) in the 2026 New Year Honours for services to sport climbing.

== Rankings ==
=== IFSC Climbing World Cup ===
Discipline	2022	2023	2024	2025
Boulder		4	5	12
Lead	20	5	1	8
Combined			1	

=== IFSC Climbing World Championships ===
==== Youth ====
Discipline	2022 Youth A
Boulder	2
Lead	2

==== Senior ====
Discipline	2023	2025
Boulder	19	17
Lead	9	25
Boulder & Lead	5	-

== Number of medals at the IFSC Climbing World Cup ==
=== Lead ===
Season	Gold	Silver	Bronze	Total
2022			1	1
2023	1			1
2024	2		2	4
2025		1	1	2
Total	3	1	4	8

=== Bouldering ===
Season	Gold	Silver	Bronze	Total
2023	1		1	2
2024			1	1
2025	1			1
Total	2	0	2	4

== Number of medals at the Summer Olympics ==
=== Combined ===
Olympics	Gold	Silver	Bronze	Total
2024	1			1
Total	1	0	0	1

== Notable ascents ==
=== Redpointed routes ===
9a+ (5.15a):

- Gancho Perfecto – Margalef (Spain) – 2024. Months after winning his Olympic gold medal, Roberts repeated the popular Chris Sharma route, marking his hardest send to date.

9a (5.14d):

- Batman – Malham Cove (United Kingdom) – 2021. Became the youngest British climber to redpoint a 9a/+-graded route at age 16.

- Rainshadow – Malham Cove (United Kingdom) – 2020. Became the youngest British climber to redpoint a 9a-graded route at age 15.

8c+ (5.14c):

- Hubble – Raven Tor (United Kingdom) – 2021. Repeat of Ben Moon's historic sport climb.

Other:

- Revelations 8b (5.13d) – Raven Tor (United Kingdom) – October 2016. Became the youngest British climber to redpoint an 8b-graded route at age 11 by repeating Jerry Moffatt's historic sport climbing route.

- Raindogs 8a (5.13b) – Malham Cove (United Kingdom) – October 2015. Became the youngest British climber to redpoint an 8a-graded route at age 10 by repeating the historic sport climbing route.

== See also ==
- History of rock climbing
- List of grade milestones in rock climbing
