= Hiroto Shimizu =

Japanese climber

Personal information
- Nationality: Japanese
- Born: 1996 (age 29–30) Osaka, Japan
- Height: 165 cm (5 ft 5 in)

Climbing career
- Type of climber: Competition lead climbing
Medal record
Men's competition climbing
Representing Japan
World Cup
Gold medal – first place	Inzai 2019	Lead
Silver medal – second place	Briançon 2019	Lead
Asian Championships
Silver medal – second place	Riyadh 2023	Lead
Asian Cup
Bronze medal – third place	Almaty 2025	Lead

Hiroto Shimizu (清水 裕登 Shimizu Hiroto) is a Japanese competition climber, specializing in competition lead climbing.

== Competition climbing ==
Shimizu began climbing on the IFSC Climbing World Cup circuit in 2014, advancing to all the lead world cup semifinals in his debut season.

In December 2015, Shimizu won a gold and bronze medal in the Lead and Bouldering disciplines respectively at the Asian Youth Championships in Putrajaya.

In July 2019, Shimizu earned his first World Cup medal, taking silver at the Lead World Cup in Briançon, completing an all-Japanese podium.

In October 2019, Shimizu won his first Lead World Cup in Inzai, becoming the fifth Japanese man to win a Lead World Cup.

In 2023, he claimed silver in the Lead discipline at the Asian Championships in Riyadh.

In 2025, Shimizu's fourth place finish at the Lead Japan Cup earned him a spot on Japan’s national team after six years. He won a bronze medal in the Lead discipline at the 2025 Asian Cup in Almaty.

== Rankings ==
=== World Cup ===
Discipline	2019	2025
Lead	6	32

=== World Youth Championships ===
Discipline	2012 Youth A	2014 Juniors	2015 Juniors
Lead	6	7	-
Bouldering	-	-	11

=== Japan Cup ===
Discipline	2013	2014	2015	2017	2018	2019	2020	2021	2022	2023	2024	2025	2026
Lead	20	2	16	5	-	3	25	-	20	13	10	4	11
Bouldering	31	23	39	-	21	33	21	14	29	17	39	22	19
