= Natsuki Tanii =

Japanese competition climber

Personal information
- Nationality: Japanese
- Born: September 23, 2003 (age 23) Kashihara, Nara, Japan
- Height: 152 cm (5 ft 0 in)

Climbing career
- Type of climber: Competition lead climbing
- Known for: 2024 Asian Championships Lead Winner
Medal record
Event / 1st / 2nd / 3rd; World Cup / / / 2
Women's competition climbing
Representing Japan
World Games
Silver medal – second place	Birmingham 2022	Lead
World Cup (Overall)
Third place	2019	Lead
World Cup (Event)
Bronze medal – third place	Wujiang 2023	Lead
Bronze medal – third place	Briançon 2019	Lead
Asian Championships
Gold medal – first place	Tai'an 2024	Lead

Natsuki Tanii (谷井 菜月 Tanii Natsuki; born September 23, 2003) is a Japanese competition climber who specializes in competition lead climbing.

== Climbing career ==
In 2019, Tanii finished on the podium at the World Cup event in Briançon, France, collecting the bronze medal in her third-ever World Cup final. Tanii was a consistent finalist for the majority of the season, securing third place in the overall 2019 Lead World Cup ranking in her first senior year.

In 2022, Tanii won the silver medal in the women's lead final at the World Games.

In 2023, Tanii placed third at the final 2023 Lead World Cup event in Wujiang, China.

In 2024, Tanii won her first senior title in the women's lead final at the Asian Championships.

== Rankings ==
=== World Cup ===
Discipline	2019	2021	2022	2023	2024	2025
Lead	3	9	6	5	15	16

=== World Championships ===
Discipline	Moscow 2021	Seoul 2025
Lead	6	15

=== World Youth Championships ===
Discipline	2017 Youth B	2018 Youth B	2022 Juniors
Lead	2	1	2
Bouldering	2	1	8
Combined	1	-	-

=== Japan Cup ===
Discipline	2015	2019	2020	2021	2022	2023	2024	2025	2026
Lead	23	6	5	4	3	2	8	6	11
