= Mei Kotake =

Japanese rock climber

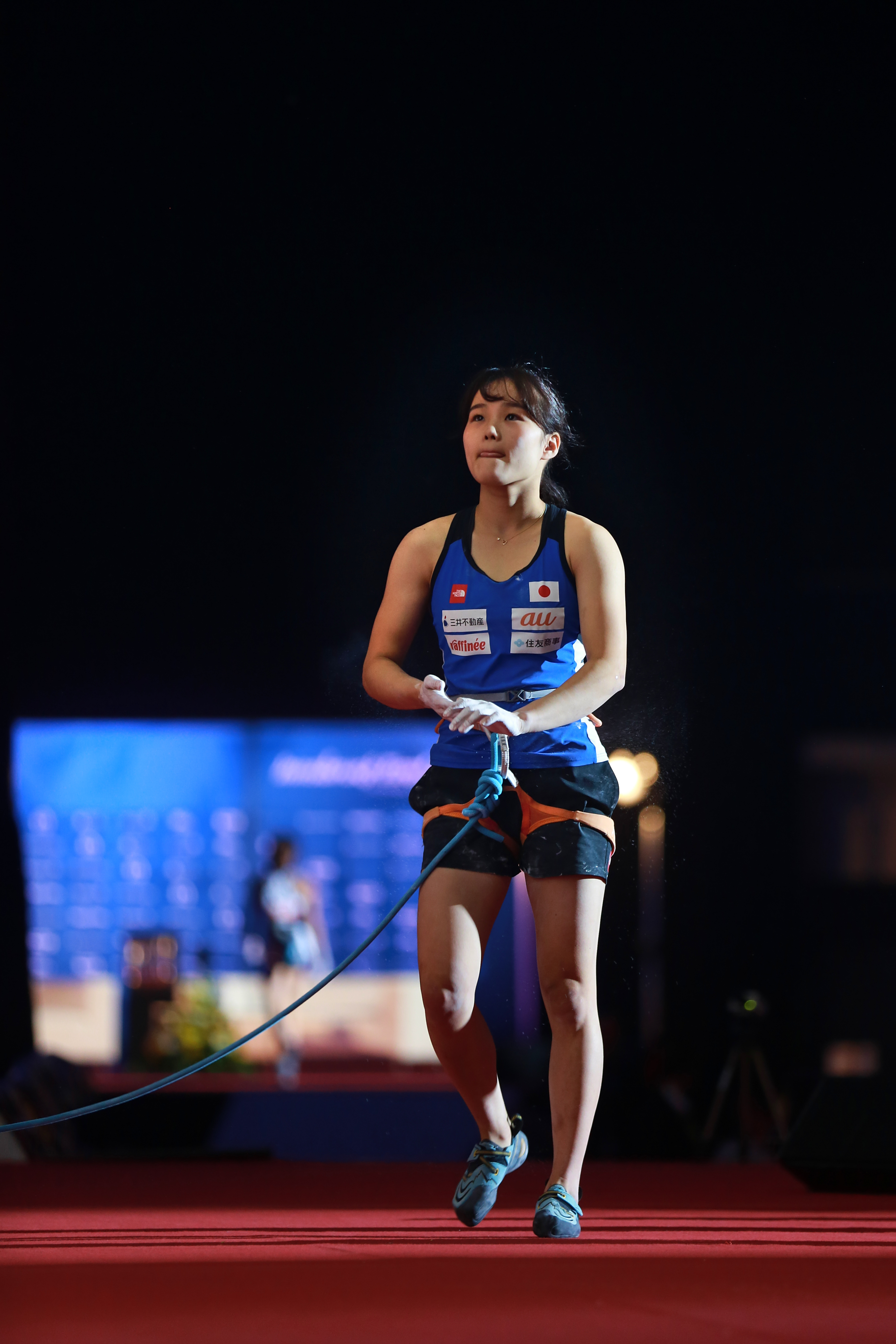
- Climbing World Championships 2018

Personal information
- Born: 18 May 1997 (age 29) Sapporo, Japan
- Occupation: Professional competition climber
- Height: 154 cm (5 ft 1 in)

Climbing career
- Type of climber: Competition climbing; Bouldering; Sport climbing
- Highest grade: Redpoint: 8c+/9a; Bouldering: 8B+ (V14)
Medal record
Women's competition climbing
World Cup
Gold medal – first place	Briancon 2024	Lead
Bronze medal – third place	Chamonix 2024	Lead
Asian Championships
Silver medal – second place	2024 Tai'an	Lead
Bronze medal – third place	2017 Tehran	Lead
Bronze medal – third place	2018 Kurajoši	Lead
Asian Cup
Gold medal – first place	2018 Hong Kong	Bouldering
- Updated on July 5, 2019

Mei Kotake (小武 芽生, Kotake Mei; born May 18, 1997 Sapporo) is a Japanese professional rock climber who specializes in competition climbing. She participates in competition lead climbing, competition bouldering and competition speed climbing disciplines.

== Early life and education ==
Kotake was born on May 18, 1997, in Sapporo, Hokkaido. She started bouldering in the fifth grade of elementary school.

Kotake acquired a degree at a women's college for nutrition and food science.

== Climbing career ==
=== Competition climbing ===
In 2014 she won the All Japan Climbing Youth Championship in the category Lead.

=== Rock climbing ===
In 2022, Kotake sent Era Vella, an 8c+/9a -graded sport climbing route in Margalef, in Spain.

== Rankings ==
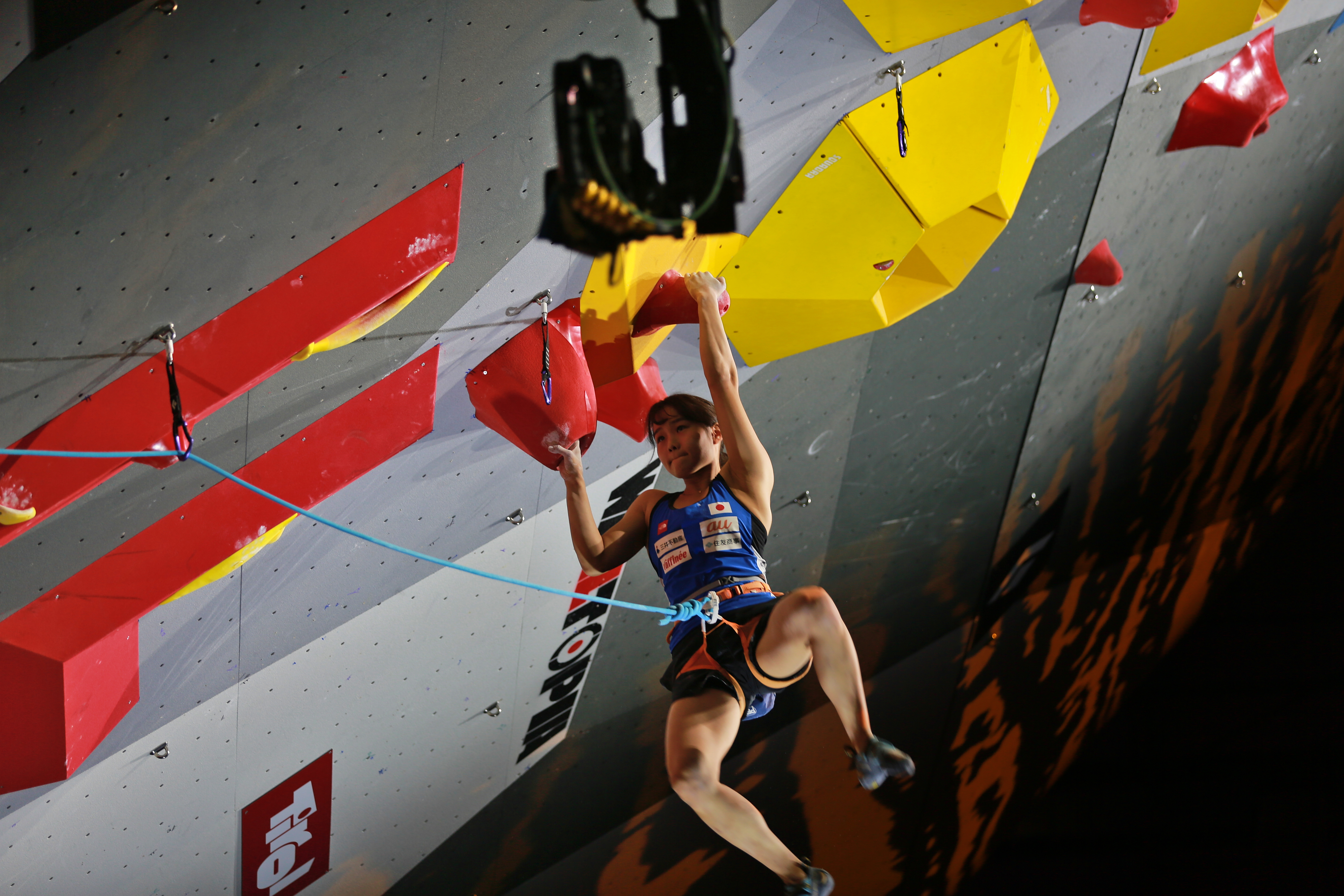
Mei Kotake in the Climbing World Championships 2018 Lead Final

=== IFSC Climbing World Championships ===
	2018	2019	2025
Lead	4	11	10
Bouldering	25	39	-
Speed	59	57	-

=== IFSC Climbing World Cup ===
	2014	2016	2017	2018	2019	2021	2022	2024	2025
Lead	-	37	27	5	15	52	22	5	17
Bouldering	46	22	11	21	-	-	-	-	-
Combined	-	8	22	-	-	-	-	-	-

=== Asian Championships ===
	2016	2017	2018	2024
Lead	5	3	3	2
Bouldering	6	7	8	-
Speed	-	23	33	-

=== Asian Cup ===
	2018
Bouldering	1

== Notable ascents ==
=== Boulder problems ===
8C (V15):

- P.I.G. - Gotthard Pass (SUI) - 2026

8B+ (V14):

- Tigris Sit - Magic Wood (SUI) - 2026
- Hazel Grace - Gotthard Pass (SUI) - 2026
- Quiet Storm - Gotthard Pass (SUI) - 2026
- New Base Line - Magic Wood (SUI) - 2024

=== Redpointed routes ===
9a (5.14d):

- Era Vella - Margalef (ESP) - 2022

8c (5.14b):

- Fish Eye - Oliana (ESP) - 2022

- Mind Control - Oliana (ESP) - 2022
