= Satone Yoshida =

Japanese competition climber

Personal information
- Nationality: Japanese
- Born: May 22, 2004 (age 22) Nara, Japan
- Education: Setsunan University
- Height: 168 cm (5 ft 6 in)

Climbing career
- Type of climber: Competition climbing; Bouldering; Sport climbing
- Highest grade: Redpoint: 9a+ (5.15a); Bouldering: 8B+ (V14)
Medal record
Men's competition climbing
Representing Japan
World Championships
Silver medal – second place	2025 Seoul	Lead
World Cup (Overall)
Third place	2025	Lead
World Cup (Event)
Gold medal – first place	2025 Bali	Lead
Silver medal – second place	2026 Koper	Lead
Silver medal – second place	2024 Briançon	Lead
Bronze medal – third place	2025 Madrid	Lead
Bronze medal – third place	2023 Briançon	Lead
Asian Championships
Bronze medal – third place	2024 Tai'an	Lead
Asian Games
Silver medal – second place	2026 Aichi-Nagoya	Lead
- Updated on September 7, 2025

Satone Yoshida (Japanese: 吉田 智音, Hepburn: Yoshida Satone) is a Japanese competition climber who specializes in competition lead climbing.

== Climbing career ==
=== Competition climbing ===
Yoshida made his senior international competition climbing debut in 2021. He placed sixth at the World Cup event in Kranj, Slovenia. Yoshida won his first IFSC international senior-level medal in July 2023 as part of the all-Japanese podium.

In July 2024, Yoshida collected a silver medal at the World Cup event in Briançon, France.

In 2025, Yoshida won his first World Cup gold medal in the men's lead final in Bali. He maintained his consistency as a finalist, securing bronze at the Madrid Lead World Cup. In September, Yoshida secured the silver medal in the lead discipline at the 2025 World Championships, thereby becoming only the third Japanese male climber to accomplish this distinction.

In 2026, Yoshida finished in the top eight in five of the six Lead events of the World Climbing Series, with a season-best second-place finish in Koper. He also won the silver medal in the lead event at the 2026 Asian Games.

== Rankings ==
=== World Cup ===
Discipline	2021	2022	2023	2024	2025
Lead	17	7	6	7	3

=== World Championships ===
Discipline	Moscow 2021	Seoul 2025
Lead	12	2

=== Japan Cup ===
Discipline	2019	2020	2021	2022	2023	2025	2026
Lead	57	2	1	2	3	6	18

== Notable ascents ==
=== Redpointed routes ===
9a+ (5.15a):

- Three Degrees of Separation, July 2026
- Biographie, August 2025

9a (5.14d):

- Action Directe, October 2025

=== Boulder problems ===
8B+ (V14):

- Utsushiyo – Mount Kasagi (JPN) – December 2025.
- Kage – Shikoku (JPN) – November 2025.
- Emotion – Mount Kasagi (JPN) – 2024.
- Tokoyo – Mount Kasagi (JPN) – 2024.
