= Masahiro Higuchi =

Japanese climber

Personal information
- Nationality: Japanese
- Born: September 30, 1992 (age 34) Saga Prefecture, Japan
- Height: 167 cm (5 ft 6 in)

Climbing career
- Type of climber: Competition lead climbing
Medal record
Event / 1st / 2nd / 3rd; World Cup / 1 / 1 / 1
Men's competition climbing
Representing Japan
World Cup (Overall)
Third place	2021	Lead
World Cup (Event)
Gold medal – first place	Kranj 2021	Lead
Silver medal – second place	Jakarta 2022	Lead
Bronze medal – third place	Kranj 2018	Lead
World Games
Silver medal – second place	Birmingham 2022	Lead

Masahiro Higuchi (樋口 純裕, Higuchi Masahiro, born September 30, 1992) is a Japanese rock climber specializing in competition lead climbing.

Higuchi began competing on the IFSC Climbing World Cup circuit in 2010. He made his first final at the 2015 Puurs Lead World Cup, placing 7th. In 2018, Higuchi made his first Lead World Cup podium, placing third at the World Cup in Kranj.

Higuchi won his First World Cup event in Lead at the Kranj World Cup in 2021.

In 2022, Higuchi won a silver medal at the Jakarta Lead World Cup.

== Rankings ==
=== World Cup ===
Discipline	2010	2011	2012	2014	2015	2016	2017	2018	2021	2022	2023	2024
Lead	47	116	27	32	19	9	19	14	3	10	9	21

=== World Youth Championships ===
Discipline	2007 Youth B
Lead	2

=== Japan Cup ===
Discipline	2008	2009	2010	2011	2012	2013	2014	2015	2017	2019	2020	2021	2022	2023	2024	2025	2026
Lead	7	2	6	2	1	9	3	1	4	24	7	2	31	6	2	5	16
