= Taisei Homma =

Japanese competition climber

Personal information
- Nationality: Japanese
- Born: October 1, 1999 (age 26) Kawaguchi, Saitama, Japan
- Occupation: Professional sport climber
- Height: 179 cm (5 ft 10 in)
- Website: https://taisei-homma.com/; https://ameblo.jp/taiseihomma/

Climbing career
- Type of climber: Sport Climbing; Competition lead climbing
- Highest grade: Redpoint: 9a+ (5.15a); Onsight/Flash: 8c (5.14b)
Medal record
Event / 1st / 2nd / 3rd; World Cup / 1 / 5 / 1
Men's competition climbing
Representing Japan
World Championships
Bronze medal – third place	Seoul 2025	Lead
World Cup (Overall)
Second place	2022	Lead
Third place	2023	Lead
World Cup (Event)
Gold medal – first place	Villars 2022	Lead
Silver medal – second place	Wujiang 2024	Lead
Silver medal – second place	Briançon 2023	Lead
Silver medal – second place	Briançon 2022	Lead
Silver medal – second place	Chamonix 2022	Lead
Silver medal – second place	Xiamen 2019	Lead
Bronze medal – third place	Wujiang 2023	Lead
Asian Championships
Bronze medal – third place	2019	Lead

Taisei Homma (本間 大晴, Homma Taisei, born October 1, 1999) is a Japanese professional rock climber, specializing in competition climbing.

== Climbing career ==
=== Competition climbing ===
In 2022, Homma won multiple World Cup medals, collecting his first gold medal and two silver medals in the Lead World Cup.

In 2023, Homma won the silver and bronze medals at the Briançon 2023 Lead World Cup and Wujiang 2023 Lead World Cup respectively.

In 2024, Homma won the silver medal at the Wujiang 2024 Lead World Cup.

In 2025, Homma advanced to the semifinal round at the Lead World Cups in Wujiang and Bali. He was unable to participate in the four remaining Lead World Cups of the season due to Japan's national team selection criteria. At the 2025 IFSC Climbing World Championships, Homma made a successful return to the finals, securing the bronze medal in the Lead discipline.

== Rankings ==
=== World Cup ===
Discipline	2018	2019	2022	2023	2024
Lead	7	15	2	3	6

=== World Championships ===
Discipline	Seoul 2025
Lead	3

=== Japan Cup ===
Discipline	2015	2017	2019	2020	2021	2022	2023	2024	2025	2026
Lead	50	1	16	20	15	1	5	11	8	12

== Notable ascents ==
=== Redpoint ===
9a+ (5.15a)

- La Rambla - Siurana (ESP) - December 2024

=== On-sight ===
8c (5.14b)

- Fish Eye - Oliana (ESP) - December 2023

8b+ (5.14a)

- Paper mullat - Oliana (ESP) - December 2023
