= Ao Yurikusa =

Japanese competition climber (born 2002)

Personal information
- Nationality: Japanese
- Born: September 21, 2002 (age 24) Aichi, Japan
- Occupation: Professional sport climber
- Height: 175 cm (5 ft 9 in)

Climbing career
- Type of climber: Sport Climbing; Competition lead climbing
Medal record
Men's competition climbing
Representing Japan
World Cup
Gold medal – first place	Jakarta 2022	Lead
Silver medal – second place	Innsbruck 2022	Lead
Asian Cup
Gold medal – first place	Almaty 2025	Lead

Ao Yurikusa (百合草 碧皇, Yurikusa Ao, born September 21, 2002) is a Japanese professional rock climber, specializing in competition climbing.

== Climbing career ==
=== Competition climbing ===
In August 2019, Yurikusa won the gold medals in the boulder and combined disciplines at the World Youth Championships in Arco. He also claimed the silver medal in the boulder discipline at the 2019 Asian Youth Championships.

The 2022 season saw Yurikusa win multiple Lead World Cup medals — silver at the Innsbruck Lead World Cup and his first World Cup gold medal in Jakarta. Yurikusa finished the season in 4th place in the overall Lead World Cup ranking.

In 2023, Yurikusa was a finalist at the 2023 IFSC Climbing World Championships, placing 5th in Lead.

In 2025, Yurikusa won the Lead gold medal at the 2025 Asian Cup held in Almaty.

== Rankings ==
=== World Cup ===
Discipline	2021	2022	2023	2024	2026
Lead	22	4	12	11	20

=== World Championships ===
Discipline	Bern 2023
Lead	5
Bouldering	49
Boulder & Lead	10

=== World Youth Championships ===
Discipline	2019 Youth A
Lead	4
Bouldering	1
Combined	1
