= 2017 in sport climbing =

This article lists the main competition climbing events and their results for 2017.

== World Championships ==
Date	Location	Competition	Discipline	Men	Women
August 30 – September 10	(Austria) Innsbruck	World Youth Championship	Junior Lead	(Japan) Yoshiyuki Ogata	(United States) Claire Buhrfeind
August 30 – September 10	(Austria) Innsbruck	World Youth Championship	Youth A Lead	(Japan) Shuta Tanaka	(United States) Ashima Shiraishi
August 30 – September 10	(Austria) Innsbruck	World Youth Championship	Youth B Lead	(United States) Colin Duffy	(Japan) Ai Mori
August 30 – September 10	(Austria) Innsbruck	World Youth Championship	Junior Speed	(Ecuador) Carlos Granja	(Russia) Daria Kan
August 30 – September 10	(Austria) Innsbruck	World Youth Championship	Youth A Speed	(Russia) Sergey Rukin	(Poland) Aleksandra Kalucka
August 30 – September 10	(Austria) Innsbruck	World Youth Championship	Youth B Speed	(Italy) Jacopo Stefani	(Russia) Polina Kulagina
August 30 – September 10	(Austria) Innsbruck	World Youth Championship	Junior Bouldering	(Japan) Yoshiyuki Ogata	(United States) Claire Buhrfeind
August 30 – September 10	(Austria) Innsbruck	World Youth Championship	Youth A Bouldering	(Italy) Filip Schenk	(United States) Ashima Shiraishi
August 30 – September 10	(Austria) Innsbruck	World Youth Championship	Youth B Bouldering	(Japan) Rei Kawamata	(Japan) Futaba Ito
August 30 – September 10	(Austria) Innsbruck	World Youth Championship	Junior Combined	(Japan) Meichi Narasaki	(Austria) Laura Stöckler
August 30 – September 10	(Austria) Innsbruck	World Youth Championship	Youth A Combined	(France) Sam Avezou	(Austria) Sandra Lettner
August 30 – September 10	(Austria) Innsbruck	World Youth Championship	Youth B Combined	(Russia) Semen Ovchinnikov	(Japan) Natsuki Tanii

== Continental Championships ==
Date	Location	Competition	Discipline	Men	Women
June 30 – July 1	(Italy) Campitello di Fassa	European Championships	Lead	(France) Romain Desgranges	(Belgium) Anak Verhoeven
June 30 – July 1	(Italy) Campitello di Fassa	European Championships	Speed	(Poland) Marcin Dzienski	(Russia) Iuliia Kaplina
August 18–19	(Germany) Munich	European Championships	Bouldering	(Germany) Jan Hojer	(Serbia) Staša Gejo
August 18–19	(Germany) Munich	European Championships	Combined	(Germany) Jan Hojer	(Slovenia) Janja Garnbret
September 18–21	(Iran) Tehran	Asian Championships	Bouldering	(Japan) Kokoro Fujii	(Japan) Akiyo Noguchi
September 18–21	(Iran) Tehran	Asian Championships	Lead	(Japan) Kokoro Fujii	(Japan) Aya Onoe
September 18–21	(Iran) Tehran	Asian Championships	Speed	(Iran) Reza Alipourshena	(Indonesia) Puji Lestari
