= Sport climbing at the 2022 World Games – Men's lead =

Men's lead at the 2022 World Games
- Venue: Sloss Furnaces, Birmingham, United States
- Dates: 16 July
- Competitors: 12 from 9 nations

Medalists
| gold medal | Sascha Lehmann | Switzerland |
| silver medal | Masahiro Higuchi | Japan |
| bronze medal | Mejdi Schalck | France |

The men's lead competition in sport climbing at the 2022 World Games took place on 16 July 2022 at the Sloss Furnaces in Birmingham, United States.

== Results ==
| Rank | Athlete | Qualification | | Final | |
| Rank | Athlete | HR | Rank | HR | Rank |
|---|---|---|---|---|---|
| 1st place, gold medalist(s) | Sascha Lehmann (SUI) | 33+ | 8 | Top | 1 |
| 2nd place, silver medalist(s) | Masahiro Higuchi (JPN) | 33+ | 8 | 32+ | 2 |
| 3rd place, bronze medalist(s) | Mejdi Schalck (FRA) | 34 | 7 | 24+ | 3 |
| 4 | Jesse Grupper (USA) | 38+ | 1 | 22+ | 4 |
| 5 | Martin Bergant (SLO) | 37 | 2 | 22+ | 5 |
| 6 | Nicolas Collin (BEL) | 36+ | 3 | 22+ | 6 |
| 7 | Paul Jenft (FRA) | 35+ | 4 | 22+ | 7 |
| 7 | Yoshiyuki Ogata (JPN) | 35+ | 4 | 22+ | 7 |
| 9 | Mathias Posch (AUT) | 35 | 6 | 18+ | 9 |
| 10 | Anže Peharc (SLO) | 29+ | 10 | did not advance | |
| 11 | Benjamín Vargas (CHI) | 23+ | 11 | did not advance | |
| 12 | Mel Janse van Rensburg (RSA) | 19+ | 12 | did not advance | |
