= 2018 IFSC Climbing World Championships =

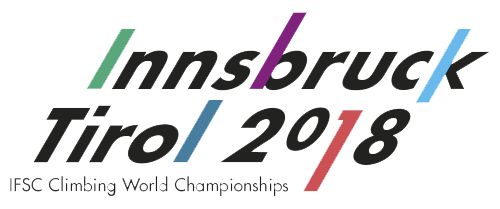
- Venue: Olympiaworld Innsbruck, Kletterzentrum Innsbruck, Marktplatz
- Location: Innsbruck, Austria
- Date: 6–16 September 2018
- Competitors: 834 from 58 nations
- Website: https://www.innsbruck2018.com/

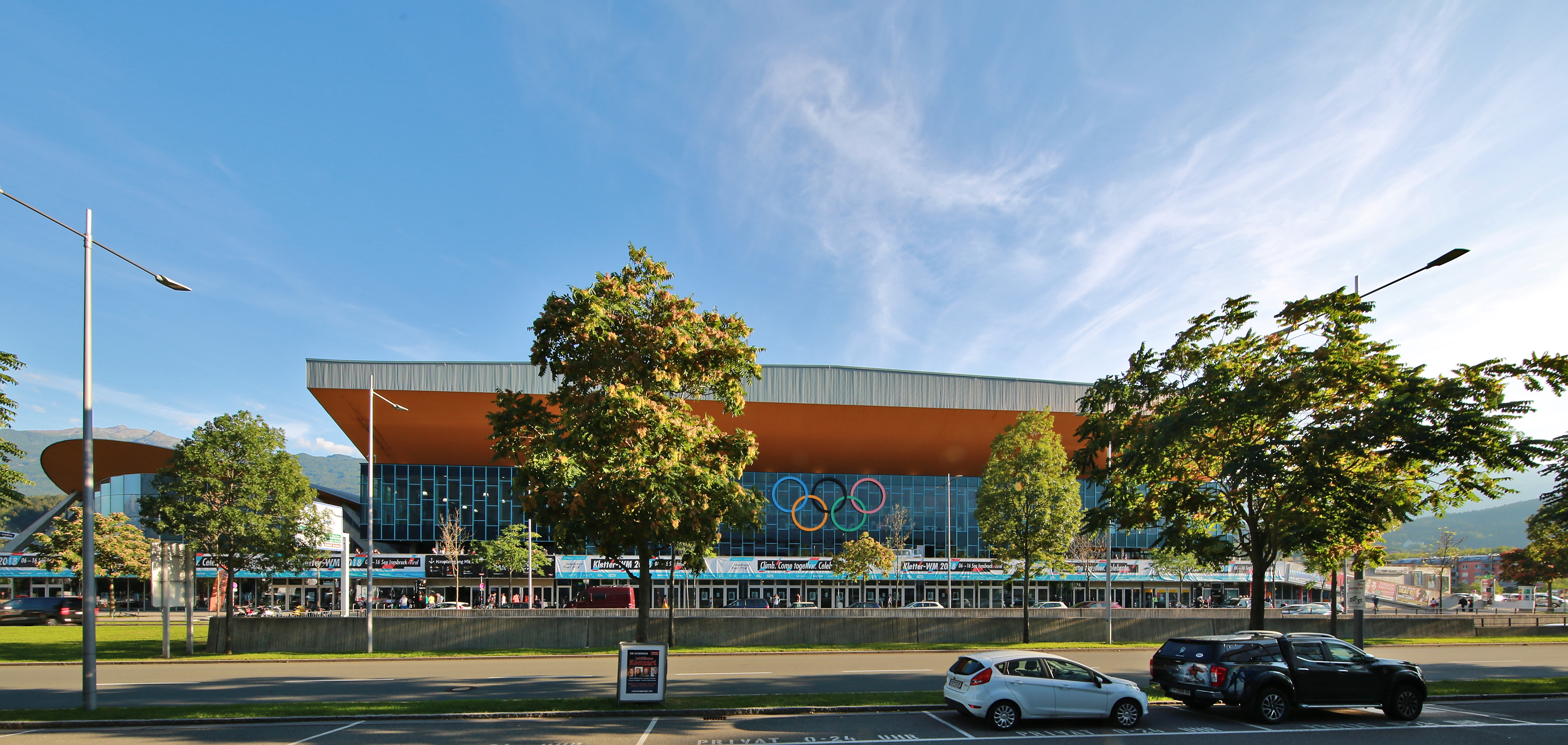
Olympiahalle in September 2018

The 2018 IFSC Climbing World Championships, the 15th edition, were held in Innsbruck, Austria from 6 to 16 September 2018. The championships consisted of lead, speed, bouldering, paraclimbing, and combined events.

== Medal summary ==
=== Medalists ===
Event	Gold	Silver	Bronze
Men's Lead	Jakob Schubert (AUT)	Adam Ondra (CZE)	Alexander Megos (GER)
Men's Speed	Reza Alipour (IRI)	Bassa Mawem (FRA)	Stanislav Kokorin (RUS)
Men's Bouldering	Kai Harada (JPN)	Jongwon Chon (KOR)	Gregor Vezonik (SLO)
Men's Combined	Jakob Schubert (AUT)	Adam Ondra (CZE)	Jan Hojer (GER)
Women's Lead	Jessica Pilz (AUT)	Janja Garnbret (SLO)	Kim Ja-in (KOR)
Women's Speed	Aleksandra Rudzinska (POL)	Anna Brozek (POL)	Mariia Krasavina (RUS)
Women's Bouldering	Janja Garnbret (SLO)	Akiyo Noguchi (JPN)	Staša Gejo (SRB)
Women's Combined	Janja Garnbret (SLO)	Sol Sa (KOR)	Jessica Pilz (AUT)

=== Medal table ===
Rank	Nation	Gold	Silver	Bronze	Total
1	Austria (AUT)	3	0	1	4
2	Slovenia (SLO)	2	1	1	4
3	Japan (JPN)	1	1	0	2
3	Poland (POL)	1	1	0	2
5	Iran (IRI)	1	0	0	1
6	South Korea (KOR)	0	2	1	3
7	Czech Republic (CZE)	0	2	0	2
8	France (FRA)	0	1	0	1
9	Germany (GER)	0	0	2	2
9	Russia (RUS)	0	0	2	2
11	Serbia (SRB)	0	0	1	1
Totals (11 entries)		8	8	8	24

== Lead ==
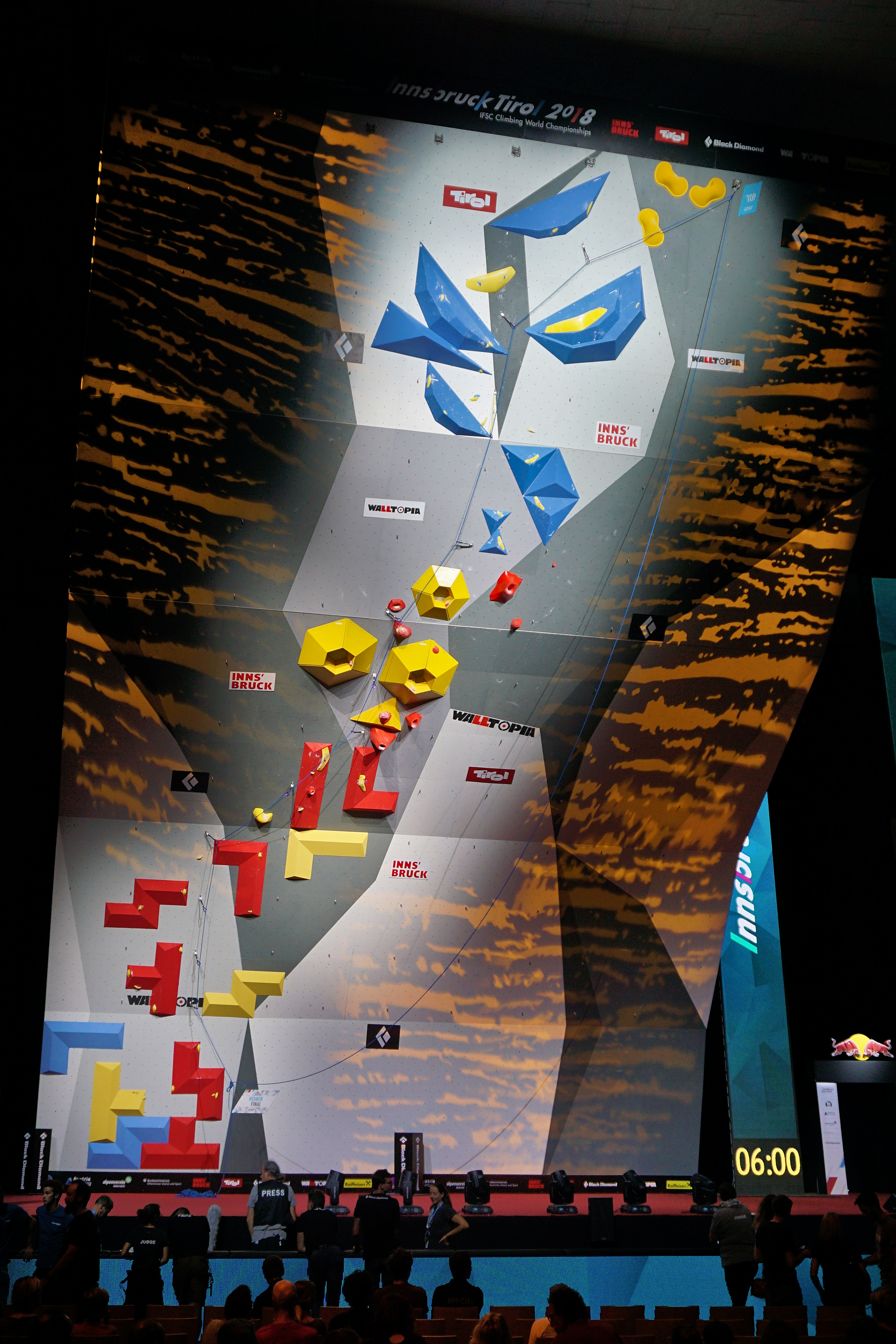
Women's Lead Final route

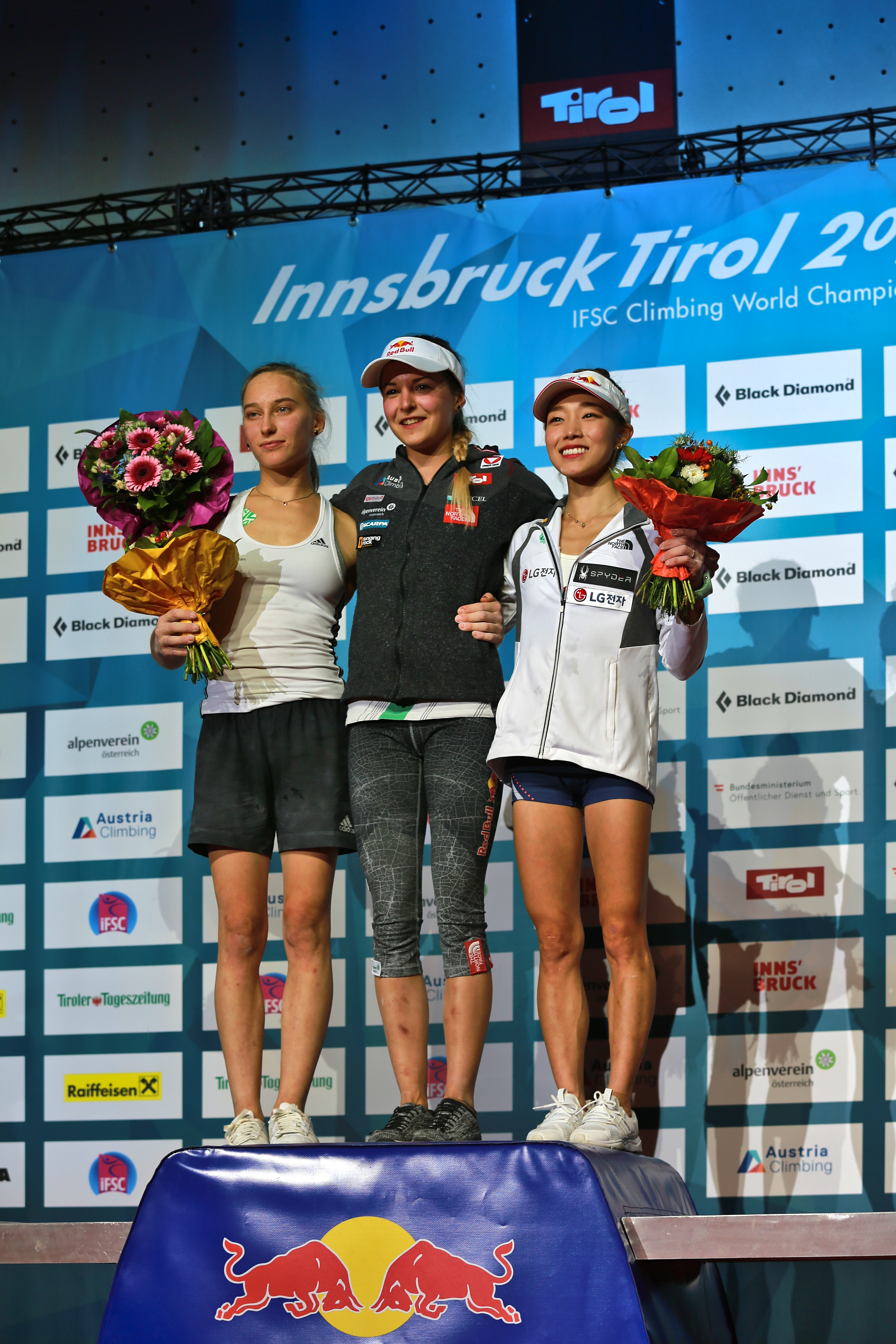
Women's Lead winners

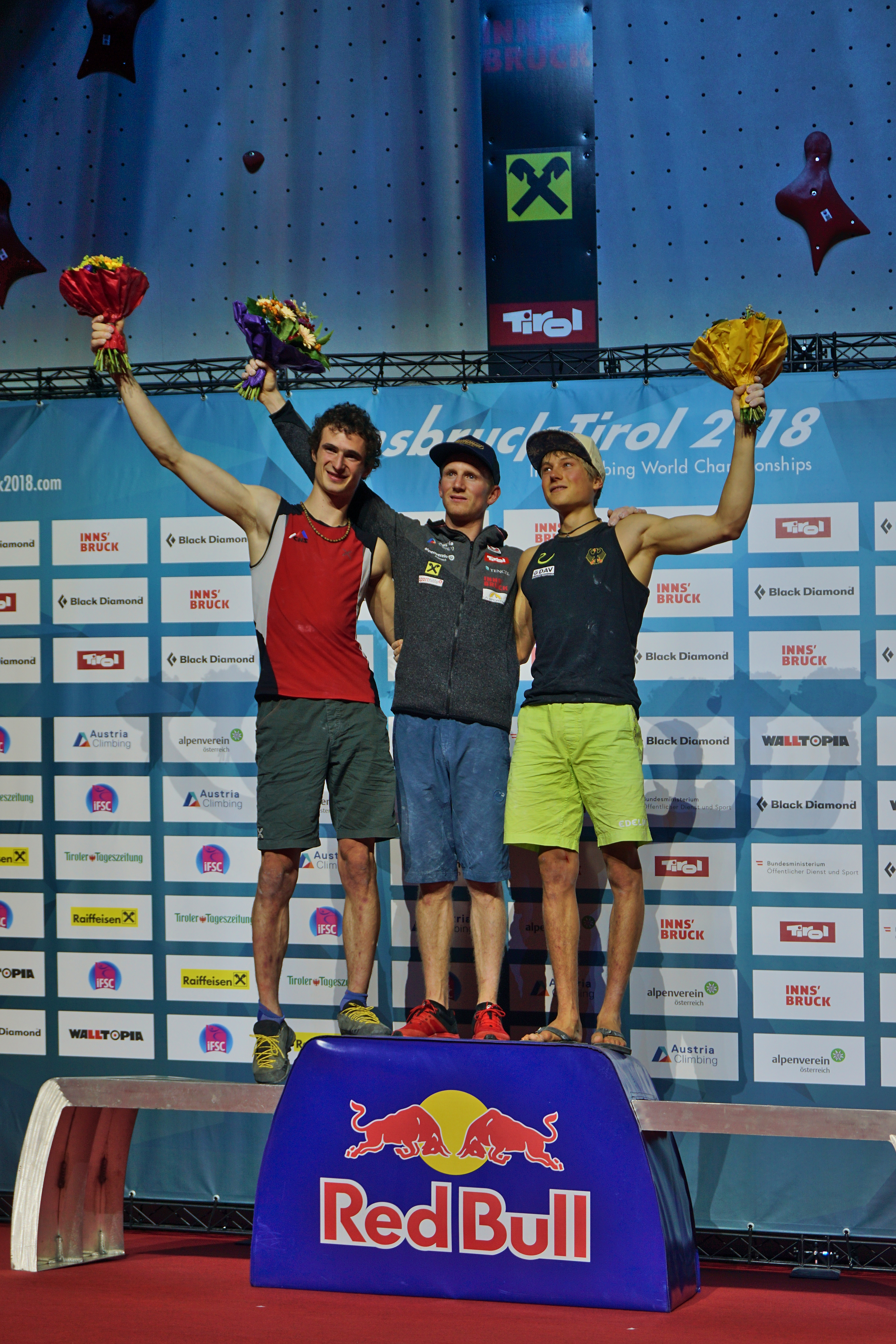
Men's Lead winners

The lead competition was the first event held at the 2018 World Championships. The women's qualification took place on the opening day, 6 September, at the Kletterzentrum, and the men's was held the following day at the same location. Women's semi-final and final were held on 8 September and the respective men's competitions the next day both at the Olympiaworld.

=== Women ===
101 athletes attended the women's lead competition. In the final penultimate climber Jessica Pilz was the first to top the route. Janja Garnbret came out as the last climber and topped the route as well. As both climbers had the same first tiebreaker by virtue of having topped the semi-final route the ranking was decided by their time on the final route, which Pilz had climbed faster and thus was awarded the gold medal. Bronze went to Kim Ja-in.

Rank	Name	Score
1	(Austria) Jessica Pilz	Top
2	(Slovenia) Janja Garnbret	Top
3	(South Korea) Kim Ja-in	34+
4	(Japan) Mei Kotake	33+
5	(United States) Ashima Shiraishi	32
6	(Belgium) Anak Verhoeven	31+
7	(Slovenia) Mia Krampl	31+
8	(Japan) Akiyo Noguchi	31+
9	(Austria) Hannah Schubert	31+
10	(Italy) Laura Rogora	24+

=== Men ===
124 athletes attended the men's lead competition. Adam Ondra and Jakob Schubert achieved the same score (36+) on the final route. Innsbruck-born Schubert won the gold medal due to his better tie-breaker, having achieved the better score in the semi-final. The bronze medal went to Alex Megos (33.5)

Rank	Name	Score
1	(Austria) Jakob Schubert	36+
2	(Czech Republic) Adam Ondra	36+
3	(Germany) Alex Megos	33.5
4	(Japan) Meichi Narasaki	31+
5	(Slovenia) Domen Škofic	29+
6	(Czech Republic) Jakub Konečný	29+
6	(Japan) Tomoaki Takata	29+
8	(Switzerland) Sascha Lehmann	23
9	(Italy) Marcello Bombardi	20+
10	(Japan) Kai Harada	16+

== Speed ==
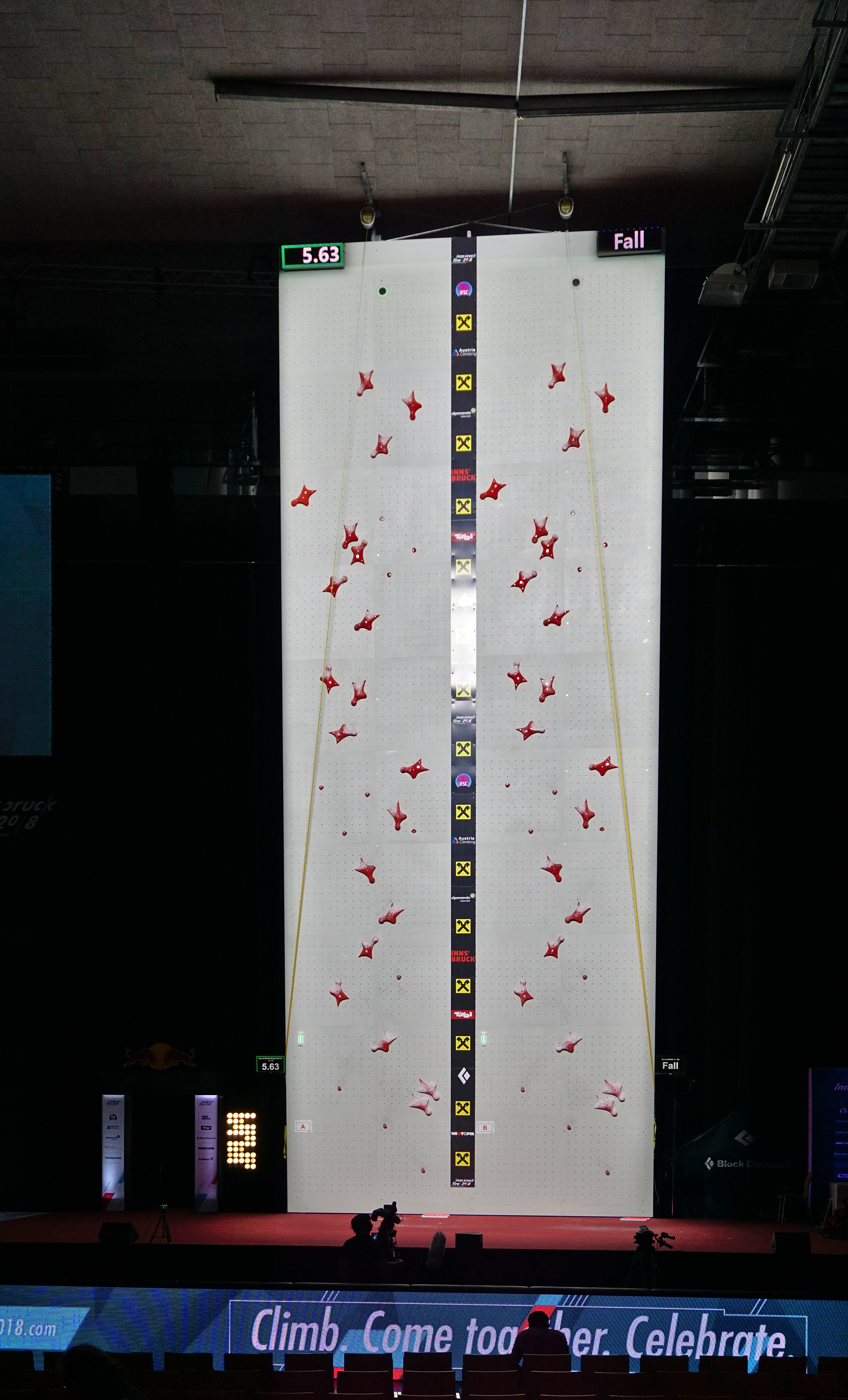
Speed's route

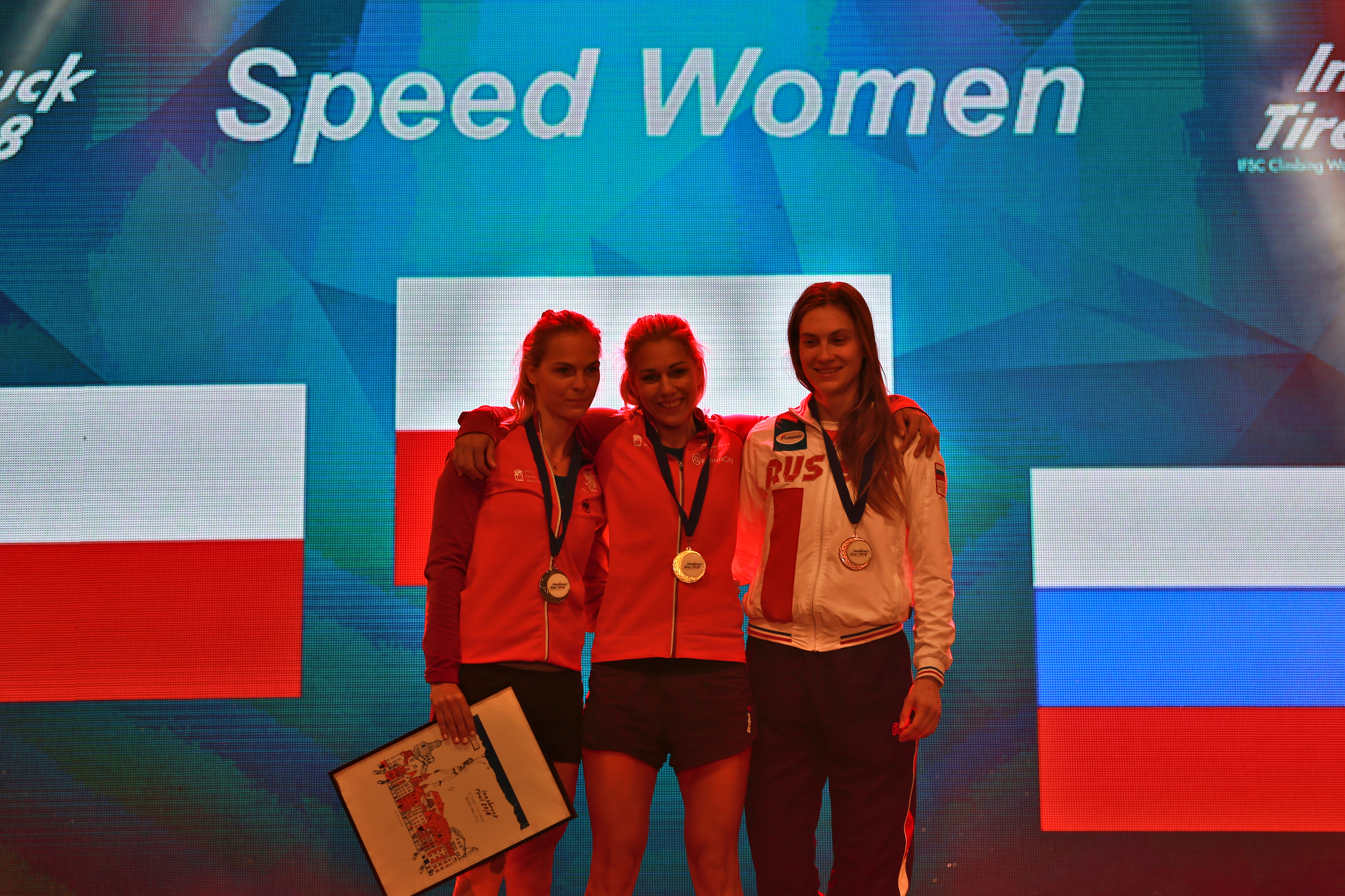
Women's Speed winners

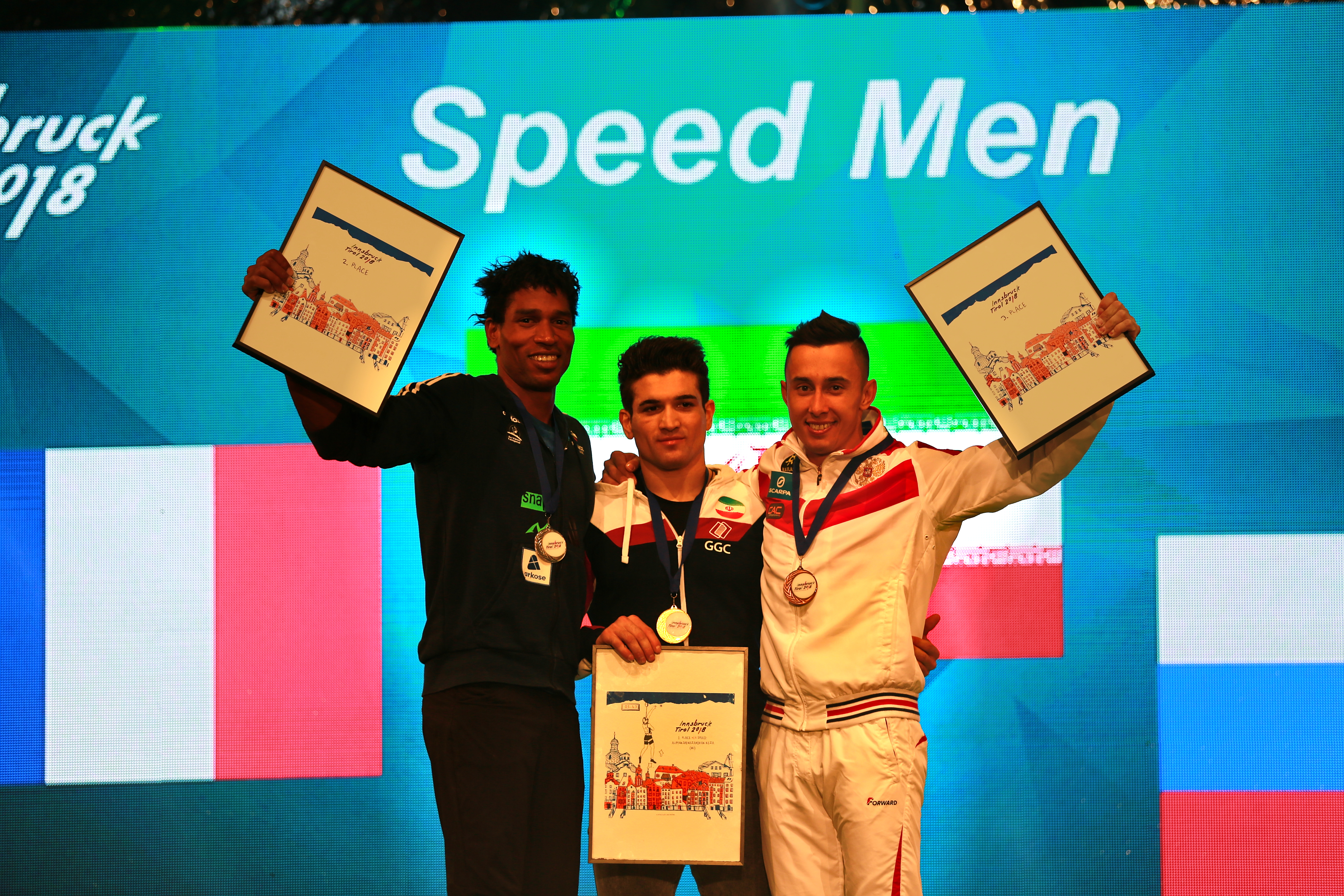
Men's Speed winners

The speed competitions took place in the Olympiaworld with the qualification rounds and the finals both being held on 13 September.

=== Women ===
94 athletes competed in the women's speed climbing event. Aleksandra Rudzinska (7.56s) won the final of the speed competition over her Polish countrywoman Anna Brozek (7.91s). Mariia Krasavina won the bronze medal in the small final against Aleksandra Kalucka, who false started.

Round of 16
Aleksandra Rudzinska (POL)	8.162
CuiLian He (CHN)	10.367
Elizaveta Ivanova (RUS)	8.304
Patrycja Chudziak (POL)	8.159
Aleksandra Kalucka (POL)	8.038
Natalia Kalucka (POL)	8.274
Anna Tsyganova (RUS)	7.978
Di Niu (CHN)	8.037
Anouck Jaubert (FRA)	FL
Alla Marenych (UKR)	8.395
Anna Brozek (POL)	7.908
Yulia Kaplina (RUS)	8.437
Mariia Krasavina (RUS)	8.264
Ekaterina Barashchuck (RUS)	8.302
YiLing Song (CHN)	8.362
Victoire Andrier (FRA)	FL

Quarter-finals
Aleksandra Rudzinska (POL)	7.830
Patrycja Chudziak (POL)	7.880
Aleksandra Kalucka (POL)	WC
Anna Tsyganova (RUS)	FS
Alla Marenych (UKR)	8.174
Anna Brozek (POL)	7.961
Mariia Krasavina (RUS)	7.713
YiLing Song (CHN)	8.906

Semi-finals
Aleksandra Rudzinska (POL)	7.775
Aleksandra Kalucka (POL)	11.971
Anna Brozek (POL)	WC
Mariia Krasavina (RUS)	FS

Final
Aleksandra Rudzinska (POL)	7.650
Anna Brozek (POL)	7.910

=== Men ===
125 athletes competed in the men's speed competition. Reza Alipour (5.630s) won the final against Bassa Mawem (fell). In the small final Stanislav Kokorin (6.028s) won against QiXin Zhong (fell) and thus claimed the bronze medal.

Round of 16
Reza Alipour (IRI)	6.144
Jordan Fishman (USA)	8.977
Kostiantyn Pavlenko (UKR)	6.228
Leonardo Gontero (ITA)	fell
Vladislav Deulin (RUS)	6.053
Dmitrii Timofeev (RUS)	12.236
Stanislav Kokorin (RUS)	5.953
Aleksandr Shilov (RUS)	6.438
Bassa Mawem (FRA)	WC
Amir Maimuratov (KAZ)	FS
Ludovico Fossali (ITA)	FS
Jan Kriz (CZE)	WC
Aleksandr Shikov (RUS)	5.851
PengHui Lin (CHN)	6.044
QiXin Zhong (CHN)	5.993
Marcin Dzieński (POL)	6.428

Quarter-finals
Reza Alipour (IRI)	5.808
Kostiantyn Pavlenko (UKR)	6.021
Vladislav Deulin (RUS)	5.904
Stanislav Kokorin (RUS)	5.832
Bassa Mawem (FRA)	5.714
Jan Kriz (CZE)	6.466
Aleksandr Shikov (RUS)	6.354
QiXin Zhong (CHN)	5.609

Semi-finals
Reza Alipour (IRI)	5.709
Stanislav Kokorin (RUS)	5.836
Bassa Mawem (FRA)	5.638
QiXin Zhong (CHN)	7.540

Final
Reza Alipour (IRI)	5.630
Bassa Mawem (FRA)	FL

== Bouldering ==
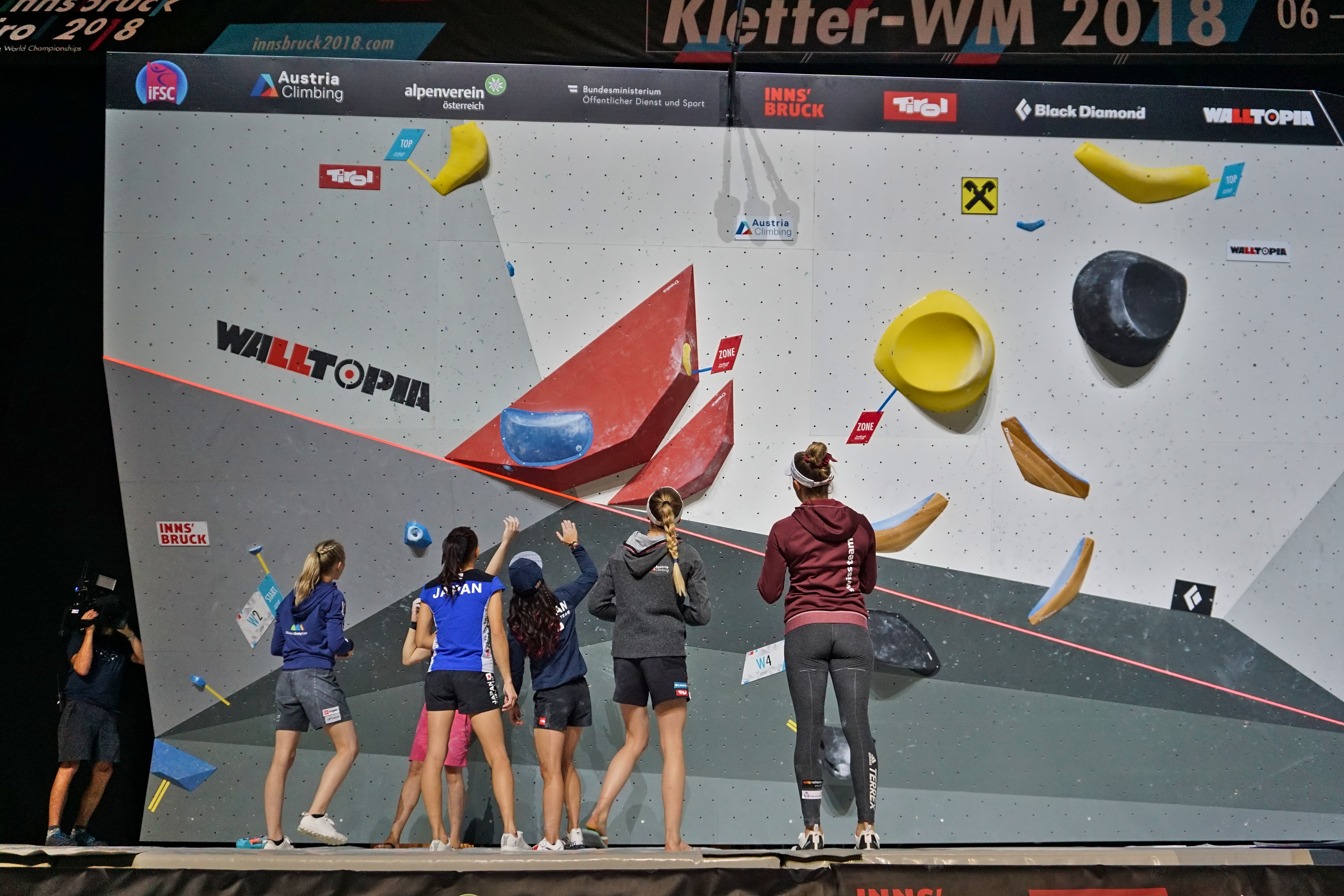
Women's Boulder Final observation

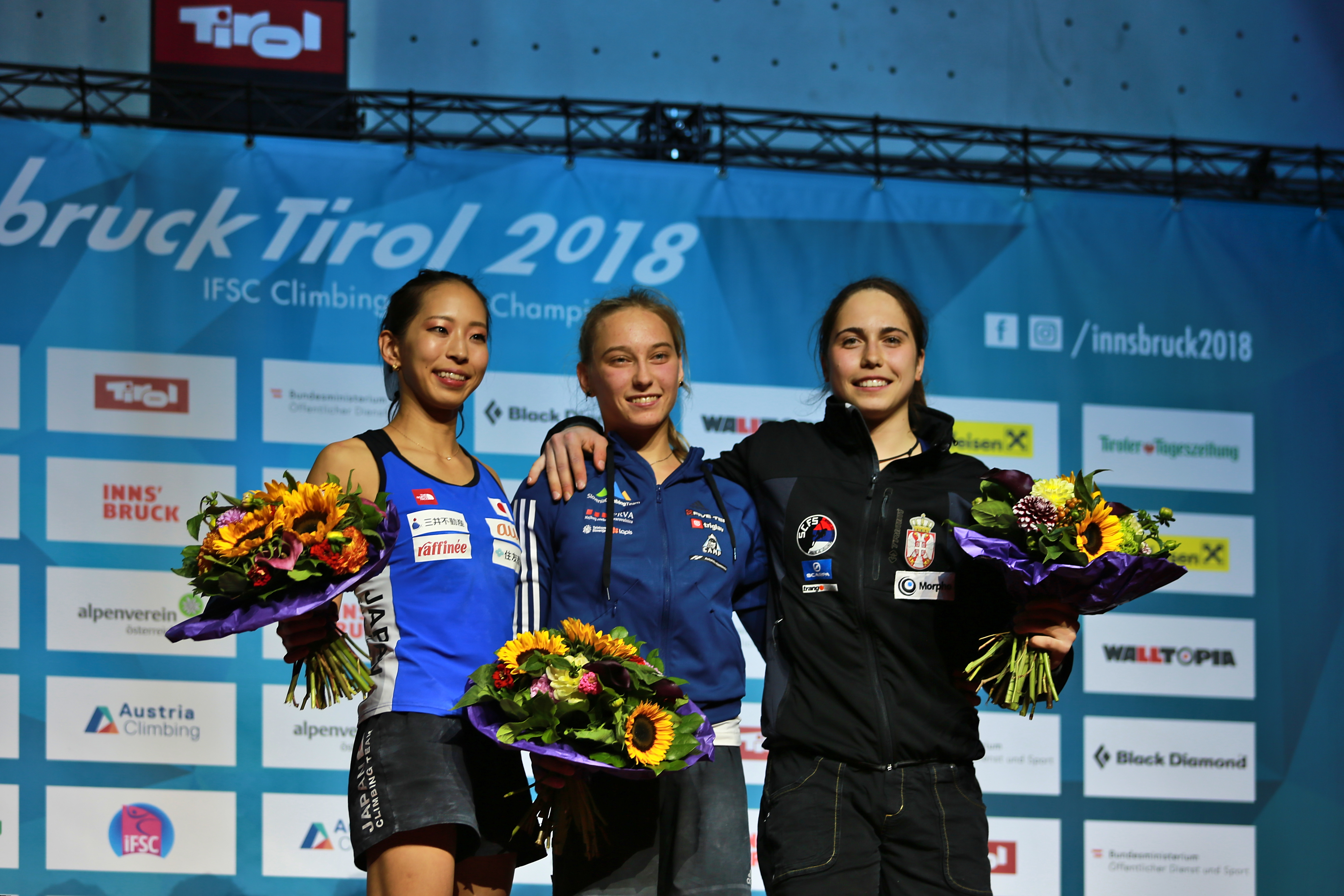
Women's Boulder winners

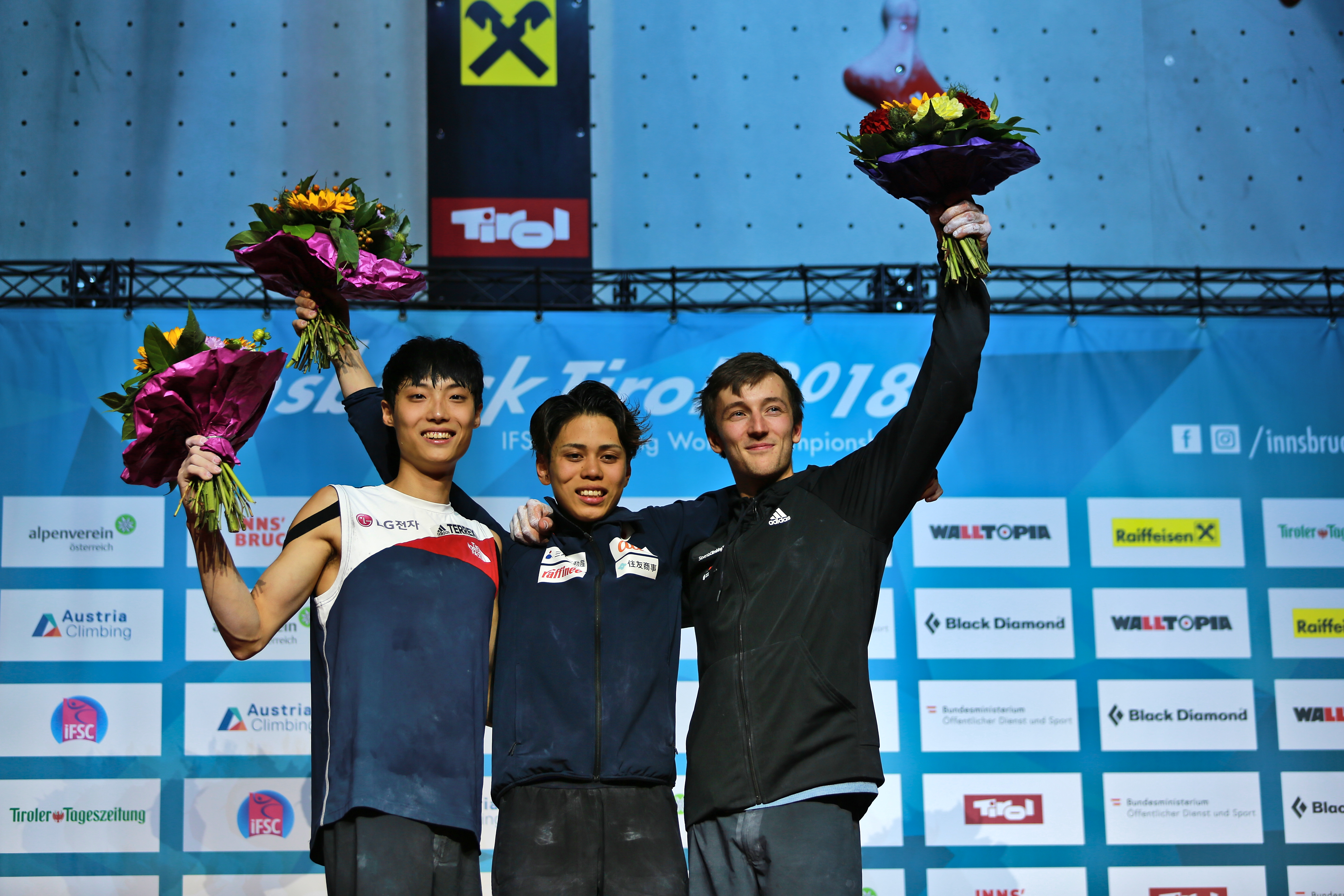
Men's Boulder winners

The bouldering event was held over four days. The qualifying took place at Kletterzentrum with the women's qualification held on 11 September and the men's on 12 September. Semi-finals and finals were held at the Olympiaworld on 14 September for the women and 15 September for the men.

=== Women ===
112 athletes attended the women's bouldering competition. In the bouldering final lead finalists Janja Garnbret, Akiyo Noguchi, and Jessica Pilz made another appearance. The World Cup bouldering seasonal winner Miho Nonaka, reigning world champion Petra Klingler, and Staša Gejo completed the final. Garnbret won gold over Noguchi and Gejo won bronze.

Rank	Name	Score
1	(Slovenia) Janja Garnbret	2T3z 7 7
2	(Japan) Akiyo Noguchi	2T2z 4 3
3	(Serbia) Staša Gejo	1T2z 1 6
4	(Austria) Jessica Pilz	0T2z 0 4
5	(Japan) Miho Nonaka	0T2z 0 4
6	(Switzerland) Petra Klingler	0T0z 0 0

=== Men ===
150 athletes attended the men's bouldering competition, making it the largest individual event at the World Championship. Kai Harada (4T4z 7 6) won the Gold medal over Jongwon Chon (3T4z 9 10) and Gregor Vezonik (3T4z 9 17). The reigning champion, Tomoa Narasaki, and the World Cup seasonal winner, Jernej Kruder, missed the cut to the final.

Rank	Name	Score
1	(Japan) Kai Harada	4T4z 7 6
2	(South Korea) Jongwon Chon	3T4z 9 10
3	(Slovenia) Gregor Vezonik	3T4z 9 17
4	(Japan) Keita Watabe	2T4z 6 10
5	(Japan) Kokoro Fujii	2T2z 5 4
6	(United Kingdom) Nathan Phillips	1T2z 5 6

== Combined ==
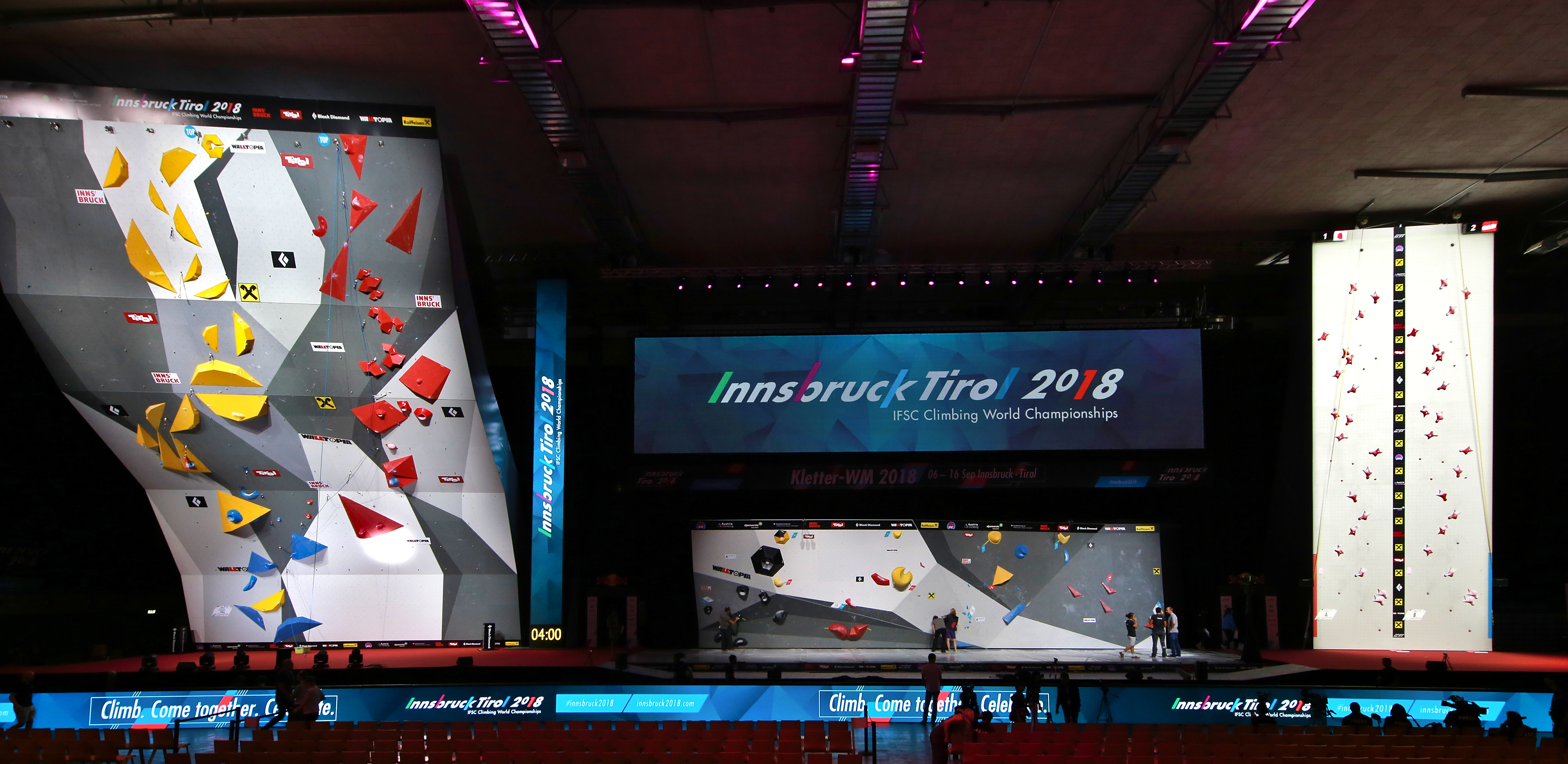
Combined Final

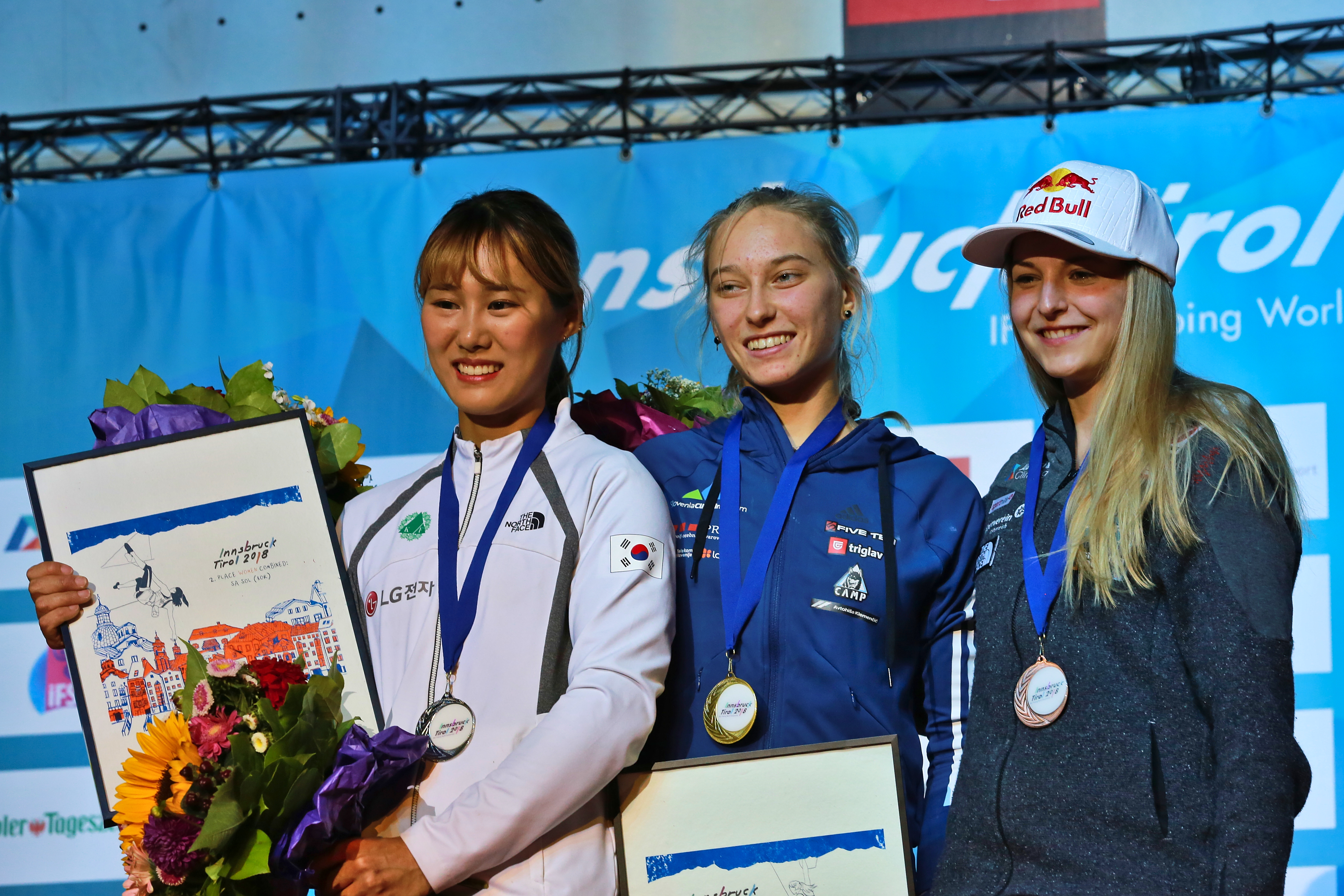
Women's Combined Final winners

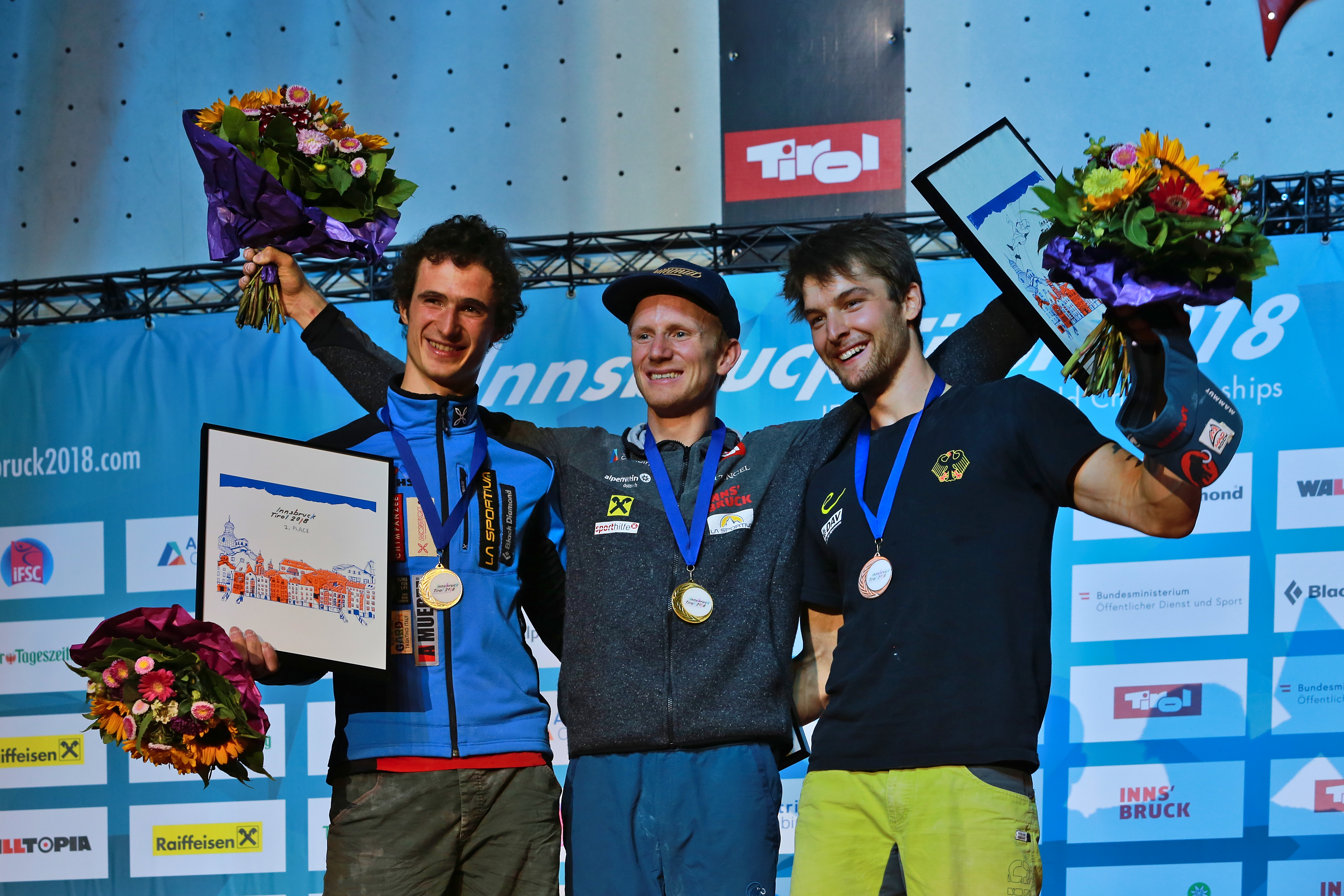
Men's Combined Final winners

In the Combined competition the six most successful athletes of the previous competitions competed against each other in Speed, Bouldering and Lead. The athletes were selected by multiplying each athletes rank from the three individual competitions. The six climbers with the lowest scores determined by this method were invited to compete in the Combined final. In the final itself the athletes were again ranked by multiplying their rank in the Speed, Bouldering and Lead portion with a lower score leading to a better Combined rank.

The women's and men's combined final were both held at the Olympiaworld, the women's on 15 September and the men's on 16 September.

=== Women ===
Rank	Name	Score	Speed	Bouldering	Lead
1	(Slovenia) Janja Garnbret	5.00	5	1 (4T4z 7 7)	1 (Top)
2	(South Korea) Sol Sa	12.00	1	2 (2T4z 9 18)	6 (23+)
3	(Austria) Jessica Pilz	24.00	2	6 (1T2z 2 7)	2 (Top)
4	(Japan) Akiyo Noguchi	54.00	6	3 (2T2z 6 6)	3 (31+)
5	(Japan) Miho Nonaka	64.00	4	4 (2T2z 10 8)	4 (26+)
6	(Switzerland) Petra Klingler	75.00	3	5 (2T2z 12 12)	5 (26+)

=== Men ===
Rank	Name	Score	Speed	Bouldering	Lead
1	(Austria) Jakob Schubert	4.00	2	1 (4T4z 8 4)	2 (37+)
2	(Czech Republic) Adam Ondra	10.00	5	2 (4T4z 11 6)	1 (42+)
3	(Germany) Jan Hojer	24.00	1	4 (3T4z 8 6)	6 (26+)
4	(Japan) Kai Harada	60.00	4	5 (3T3z 7 4)	3 (34+)
5	(Japan) Tomoa Narasaki	72.00	6	3 (3T4z 6 5)	4 (34)
6	(Japan) Kokoro Fujii	90.00	3	6 (2T4z 2 5)	5 (30+)
