= Andrew Earl (climber) =

British rock climber

Personal information
- Nationality: British
- Born: 1976 (age 49–50)
- Education: Sunderland University
- Website: www.andrewearl.co.uk

Climbing career
- Type of climber: Traditional climbing, bouldering
- Highest grade: Bouldering: 8B+ (V14)
- Retired from competition: 2008
Medal record
IFSC European Championships
Silver medal – second place	2007 Birmingham	Bouldering
- Updated on 20 May 2013

Andrew Earl, or Andy Earl (born 1976), is a professional climber and coach from the north-east of England. He performs in both traditional climbing and bouldering, having ascended both E9 and 8B+ (V14) graded problems in Europe. He was British bouldering champion from 2003 to 2006. In 2004, he won the silver medal in bouldering at the European Championships in Birmingham. In 2007, he won the fourth stage of the Bouldering World Cup in Réunion.

== Notable ascents ==
=== Bouldering ===
- Monk Life, 8B+, Northumberland. (Second ascent)
- Blood Sport, 8A+, Shaftoe Crags, Northumberland. (First ascent)
- The Bitch, 8A+, Northumberland. (First ascent)
- Desperado, 8A+, Northumberland. (First ascent)
- Cypher, 8B, UK.
- High Fidelity, 8B, UK.
- The Ace, 8B, UK.
- Careless Torque, 8A, UK.

=== Traditional climbing ===
- The Dark Side, E9, Back Bowden Doors, Northumberland. (First ascent)
- The Prow, E9, Northumberland. (First ascent)
- The Young, E8, Northumberland. (First ascent)
- Endless Flight Direct, E8, Northumberland. (First ascent)
