= Jessica Pilz =

Austrian rock climber (born 1996)

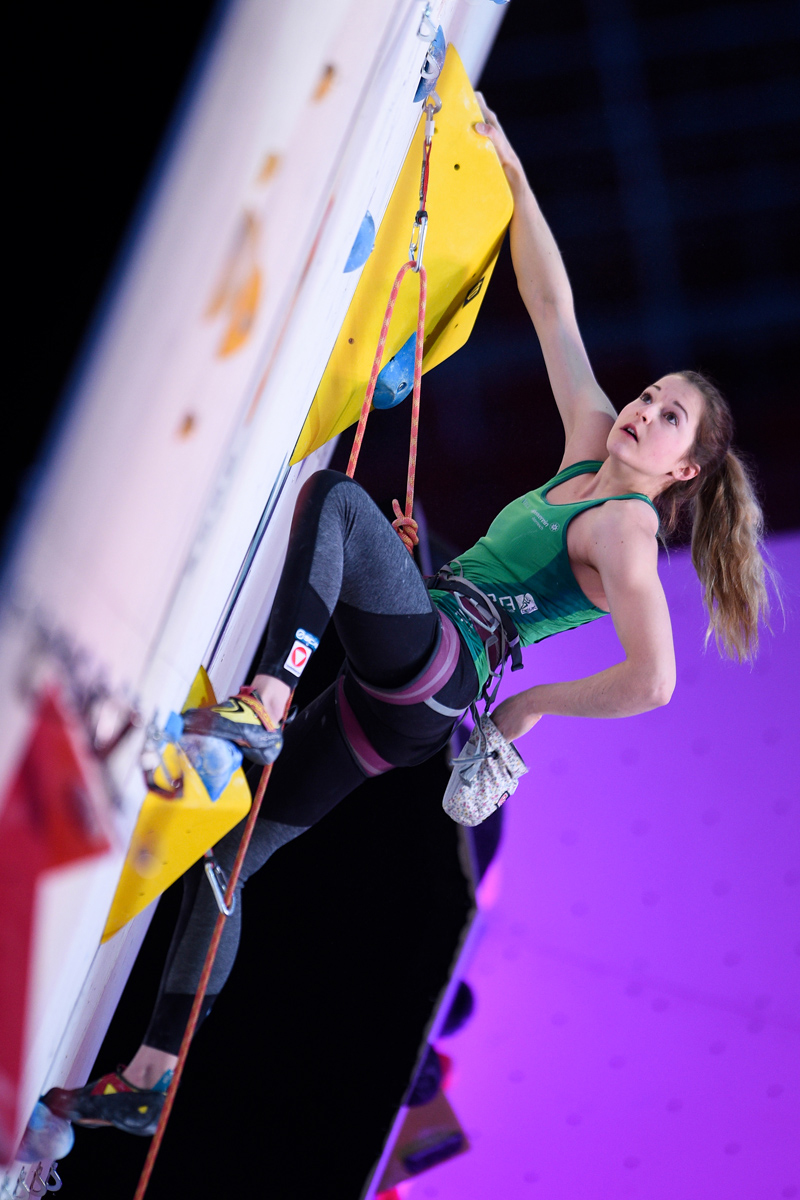
- Pilz competing in 2017

Personal information
- Nationality: Austrian
- Born: 22 November 1996 (age 29) Haag, Austria
- Height: 165 cm (5 ft 5 in)
- Weight: 52 kg (115 lb)

Climbing career
- Type of climber: Competition climbing; Sport climbing; Bouldering
- Highest grade: Redpoint: 9a+ (5.15a)
- Known for: Bronze Medalist at Paris Olympics 2024; World Champion in 2018 (Lead); Won 6 international youth competitions in competition lead climbing; Won 2 international youth competitions in competition bouldering
Medal record
Women's competition climbing
Representing Austria
Event	1st	2nd	3rd
Olympic Games	0	0	1
World Championships	2	1	1
World Cup	3	8	6
Olympic Games
Bronze medal – third place	2024 Paris	Combined
World Championships
Gold medal – first place	2018 Innsbruck	Lead
Gold medal – first place	2021 Moscow	Combined
Silver medal – second place	2023 Bern	Combined
Bronze medal – third place	2018 Innsbruck	Combined
World Cup (Overall)
Winner	2023	Lead
Winner	2024	Lead
Second place	2018	Lead
Third place	2015	Lead
Third place	2016	Combined
Third place	2019	Combined
European Championships
Silver medal – second place	2022 Munich	Lead
Bronze medal – third place	2015 Chamonix	Lead
Bronze medal – third place	2017 Campitello di Fassa	Lead
Bronze medal – third place	2022 Munich	Combined
Winter Military World Games
Gold medal – first place	2017	Lead
Gold medal – first place	2017	Bouldering
Silver medal – second place	2017	Speed
- Updated on 28 April 2019

Jessica Pilz (born 22 November 1996) is an Austrian professional rock climber who specializes in competition climbing. She won the bronze medal in the combined bouldering and lead climbing event at the 2024 Summer Olympics.

== Climbing career ==
=== Competition climbing ===
Pilz started competing in 2010, both in competition lead climbing and competition bouldering. From 2011 to 2015, she won six international youth competitions in lead climbing. In 2014, she also won both the European Youth Cup and Youth Championships in bouldering.

In 2017, Pilz won the Winter Military World Games both in lead climbing and bouldering.

In 2018, Pilz won the lead climbing event at the 2018 IFSC Climbing World Championships in Innsbruck by climbing the route a few seconds faster than the former World Champion, Janja Garnbret. She won the bronze medal in the combined event at the same World Championships.

In 2019, Pilz placed 10th in the combined event at the 2019 IFSC Climbing World Championships, qualifying her for the 2020 Olympics, where she finished 7th.

In 2021, Pilz won the combined event at the 2021 IFSC Climbing World Championships.

In 2023, Pilz qualified to compete in the combined event at the 2024 Summer Olympics in Paris by placing second in the combined event at the 2023 IFSC Climbing World Championships. Pilz won the overall title in lead climbing in the 2023 IFSC Climbing World Cup series.

In 2024, Pilz won the bronze medal in the combined event at the 2024 Summer Olympics.

In 2024, Pilz won the overall Lead world cup title for the second time. Besides 2 silvers in the lead world cups in Chamonix and Koper she won the gold medal in Seoul.

Pilz and fellow Austrian climber Jakob Schubert, competed as a duo and took the Gold title in the Red Bull Dual Ascent.

=== Rock climbing ===
In November 2024, she redpointed Papichulo, a 9a+ (5.15a) graded sport climbing route in Spain. Pilz also redpointed Paint it Black, an 8c (5.14b) graded sport route in the Zillertal Valley, Austria.

In November 2023, she completed the following routes in Antalya, Turkey:

- Imhotep 8a (flash)
- Paluze (1l.) 8a (OS)
- American Airlines 8a+
- Nothing Else Matters 8b (hard)
- Catch the Rainbow 8b+/c
- Panic Room 8c
- Aaron 8c (without knee pads)
- Kaos 8c
- Beastmaker 8c
- Andreas Blues 8c+

In January 2016, during a short trip to the famous crag of Oliana in Spain, she redpointed two 8c+ (5.14c) graded sport climbing routes.

== Rankings ==
=== IFSC Climbing World Cup ===
Discipline	2012	2013	2014	2015	2016	2017	2018	2019	2021	2022	2023	2024
Lead	33	19	13	3	9	4	2	10	-	10	1	1
Bouldering	–	–	–	–	25	58	11	5	12	7	17	11
Speed	–	–	–	–	–	57	63	-	-	-	-	-
Combined	–	–	–	–	3	10	4	3	-	-	4	

=== IFSC Climbing World Championships ===
Youth

Discipline	2010 Youth B	2011 Youth B	2012 Youth A	2013 Youth A	2014 Junior	2015 Junior
Lead	16	1	1	1	2	2
Bouldering	–	–	–	–	–	3
Speed	–	–	–	–	–	21

Adult

Discipline	2016	2018	2019	2023
Lead	5	1	6	6
Bouldering	-	4	33	8
Speed	-	59	43	-
Combined	-	3	10	2

=== Climbing European Championships ===
Youth

Discipline	2012 Youth A	2013 Youth A	2014 Junior	2015 Junior
Lead	1	1	2	1
Bouldering	–	2	1	2

Adult

Discipline	2013	2015	2017
Lead	11	3	3
Bouldering	–	5	12
Speed	–	31	41

=== Sport climbing at the Winter Military World Games ===
Discipline	2017
Lead	1
Bouldering	1
Speed	2

=== European Youth Cup ===
Discipline	2010 Youth B	2011 Youth B	2012 Youth A	2013 Youth A	2014 Junior	2015 Junior
Lead	5	2	2	6	2	–
Bouldering	–	3	5	12	1	2

== Number of medals in the IFSC Climbing World Cup ==
=== Lead ===
Season	Gold	Silver	Bronze	Total
2014			1	1
2015		3	3	6
2016		1		1
2017		1		1
2018	2	3	1	6
2019		1	1	2
2020				0
2021				0
2022				0
2023		2	1	3
2024	1	1		1
Total	3	12	7	22

=== Bouldering ===
Season	Gold	Silver	Bronze	Total
2019			1	1
Total	0	0	1	1

== Gallery ==
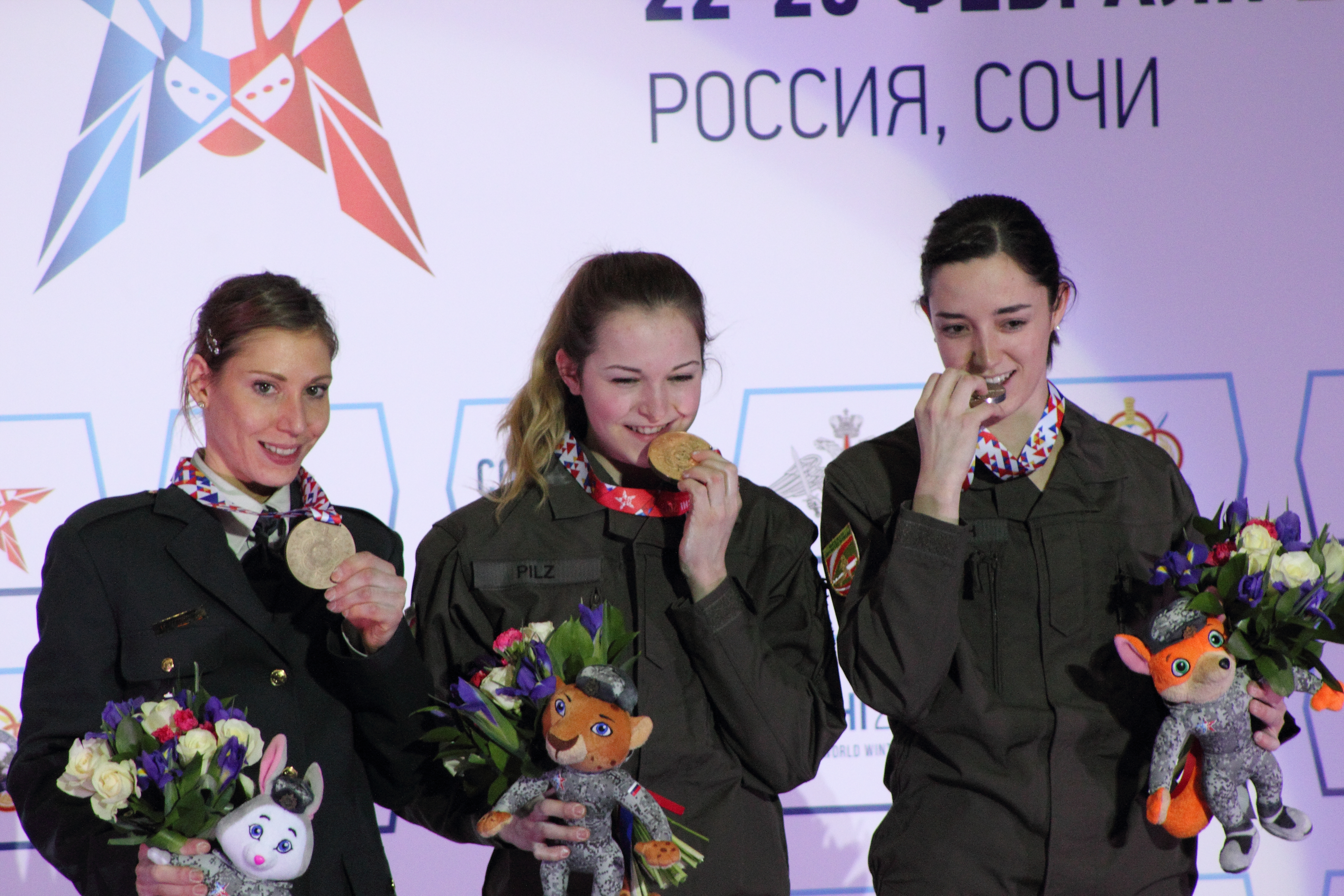
Pilz receiving gold medal in lead climbing at the 2017 Winter Military World Games

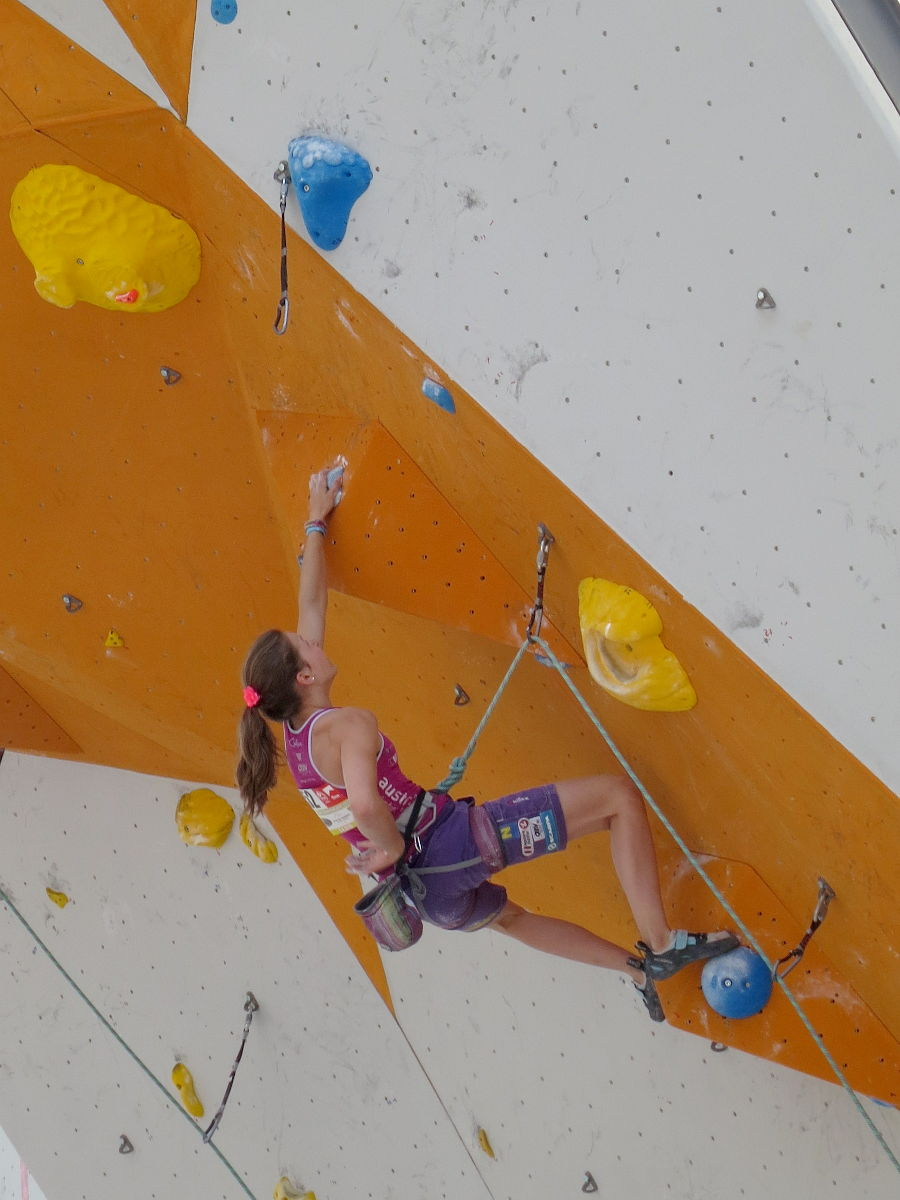
Pilz competing at the European Championships in Chamonix, 2013

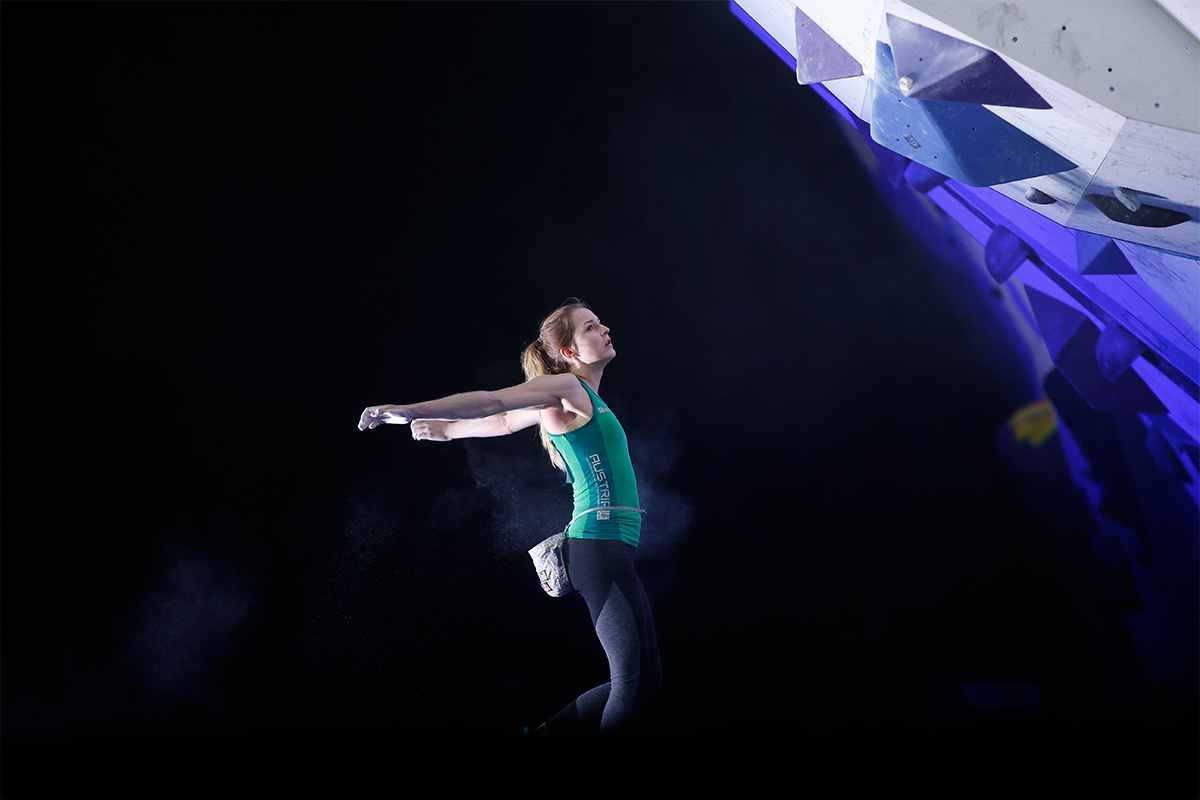
Pilz competing at the Winter Military World Games in Sochi, 2017

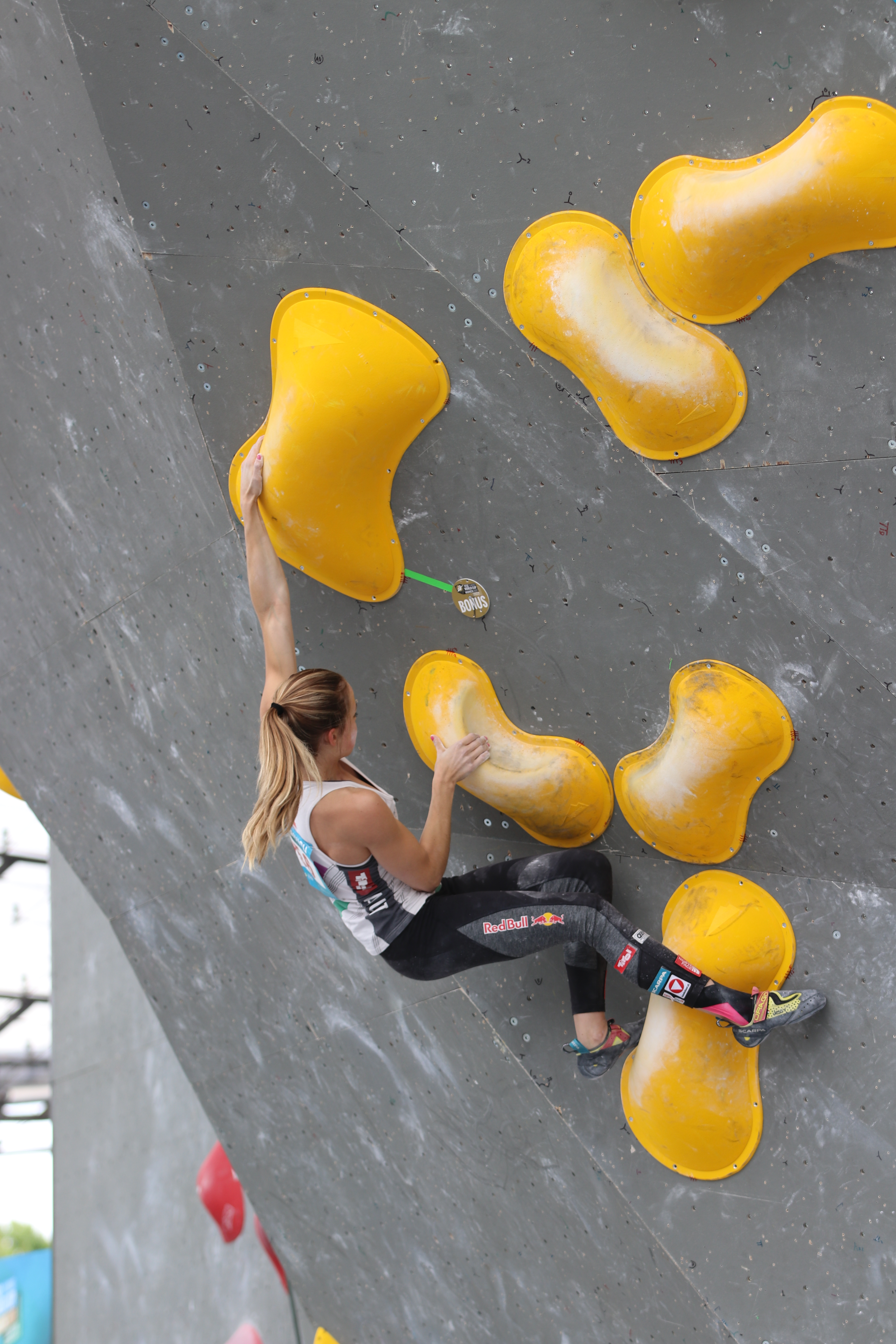
Pilz competing at the Bouldering World Cup in Munich, 2017
