= Viktoriia Meshkova =

Russian rock climber

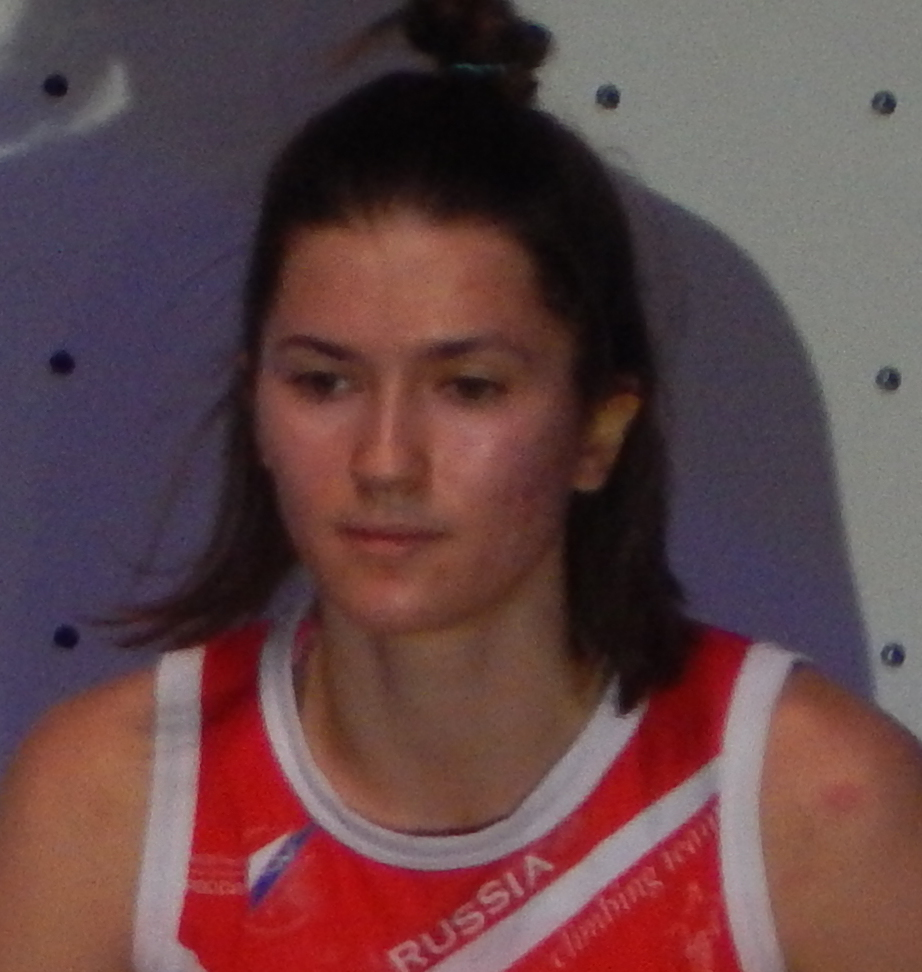

Personal information
- Nationality: Russian
- Born: September 20, 2000 (age 25) Ekaterinburg, Russia

Climbing career
- Type of climber: Competition climbing
- Known for: European triple champion (2020)
Medal record
Women's competition climbing
Representing (Individual Neutral Athletes) Individual Neutral Athlete
Event / 1st / 2nd / 3rd; European Championship / 3 / – / –
European Championships
Gold medal – first place	2020 Moscow	Bouldering
Gold medal – first place	2020 Moscow	Lead
Gold medal – first place	2020 Moscow	Combined
World Youth Championships
Silver medal – second place	2018 Brussels	Junior Bouldering

Viktoriia Vladislavovna Meshkova (Russian: Виктория Владиславовна Мешкова; born 20 September 2000) is a Russian rock climber who specializes in competition climbing, competing in competition lead climbing, competition bouldering and the combined event. She is best known for her three victories at the 2020 European Championships in the lead, bouldering, and combined. Winning the combined event gave her the right to compete at the 2020 Summer Olympics, where competition climbing was debuted.

== Rankings ==
=== Climbing World Championships ===
Youth

Discipline	2015 Youth B	2016 Youth A	2017 Youth A	2018 Junior
Lead	6	9	10	4
Bouldering	–	–	–	–
Speed	–	-	-	-
Combined	–	-	-	-

=== Climbing European Championships ===
Youth

Discipline	2016 Youth A	2017 Youth A	2018 Junior
Lead	9	13	5
Bouldering	–	12	2
Speed	-	-	-
Combined	-	-	-

Adult

Discipline	2020
Lead	1
Bouldering	1
Speed	16
Combined	1
