= Sport climbing at the 2022 World Games – Men's boulder =

Men's boulder at the 2022 World Games
- Venue: Sloss Furnaces, Birmingham, United States
- Dates: 15 July
- Competitors: 11 from 8 nations

Medalists
| gold medal | Nicolas Collin | Belgium |
| silver medal | Kokoro Fujii | Japan |
| bronze medal | Yoshiyuki Ogata | Japan |

The men's boulder competition in sport climbing at the 2022 World Games took place on 15 July 2022 at the Sloss Furnaces in Birmingham, United States.

== Results ==
=== Qualification ===
| Rank | Athlete | Boulder | | | | Result | Notes |
| Rank | Athlete | 1 | 2 | 3 | 4 | Result | Notes |
|---|---|---|---|---|---|---|---|
| 1 | Kokoro Fujii (JPN) | T | T | T | T | 4T4z 11 9 | Q |
| 2 | Anže Peharc (SLO) | z | T | T | T | 3T4z 3 7 | Q |
| 3 | Nimrod Marcus (ISR) | T | z | T | T | 3T4z 6 6 | Q |
| 4 | Nicolai Uznik (AUT) | T | T | z | T | 3T4z 7 8 | Q |
| 5 | Yoshiyuki Ogata (JPN) | T | z | z | T | 2T4z 10 11 | Q |
| 6 | Nicolas Collin (BEL) | – | z | T | T | 2T3z 4 11 | Q |
| 7 | Hannes Van Duysen (BEL) | z | z | z | T | 1T4z 1 4 | |
| 8 | Paul Jenft (FRA) | – | z | z | T | 1T3z 1 5 | |
| 9 | Mejdi Schalck (FRA) | – | z | z | T | 1T3z 3 5 | |
| 10 | Christopher Cosser (RSA) | z | z | z | z | 0T4z 0 14 | |
| 11 | Joe Goodacre (USA) | – | – | z | z | 0T2z 0 6 | |

=== Final ===
| Rank | Athlete | Boulder | | | | Result |
| Rank | Athlete | 1 | 2 | 3 | 4 | Result |
|---|---|---|---|---|---|---|
| 1st place, gold medalist(s) | Nicolas Collin (BEL) | T | T | T | T | 4T4z 6 4 |
| 2nd place, silver medalist(s) | Kokoro Fujii (JPN) | T | T | T | T | 4T4z 8 5 |
| 3rd place, bronze medalist(s) | Yoshiyuki Ogata (JPN) | z | T | T | T | 3T4z 4 5 |
| 4 | Nicolai Uznik (AUT) | T | T | z | T | 3T4z 5 5 |
| 5 | Anže Peharc (SLO) | z | T | T | T | 3T4z 6 6 |
| 6 | Nimrod Marcus (ISR) | T | T | z | T | 3T4z 8 6 |
