= 2020 IFSC Climbing European Championships =

Climbing championships

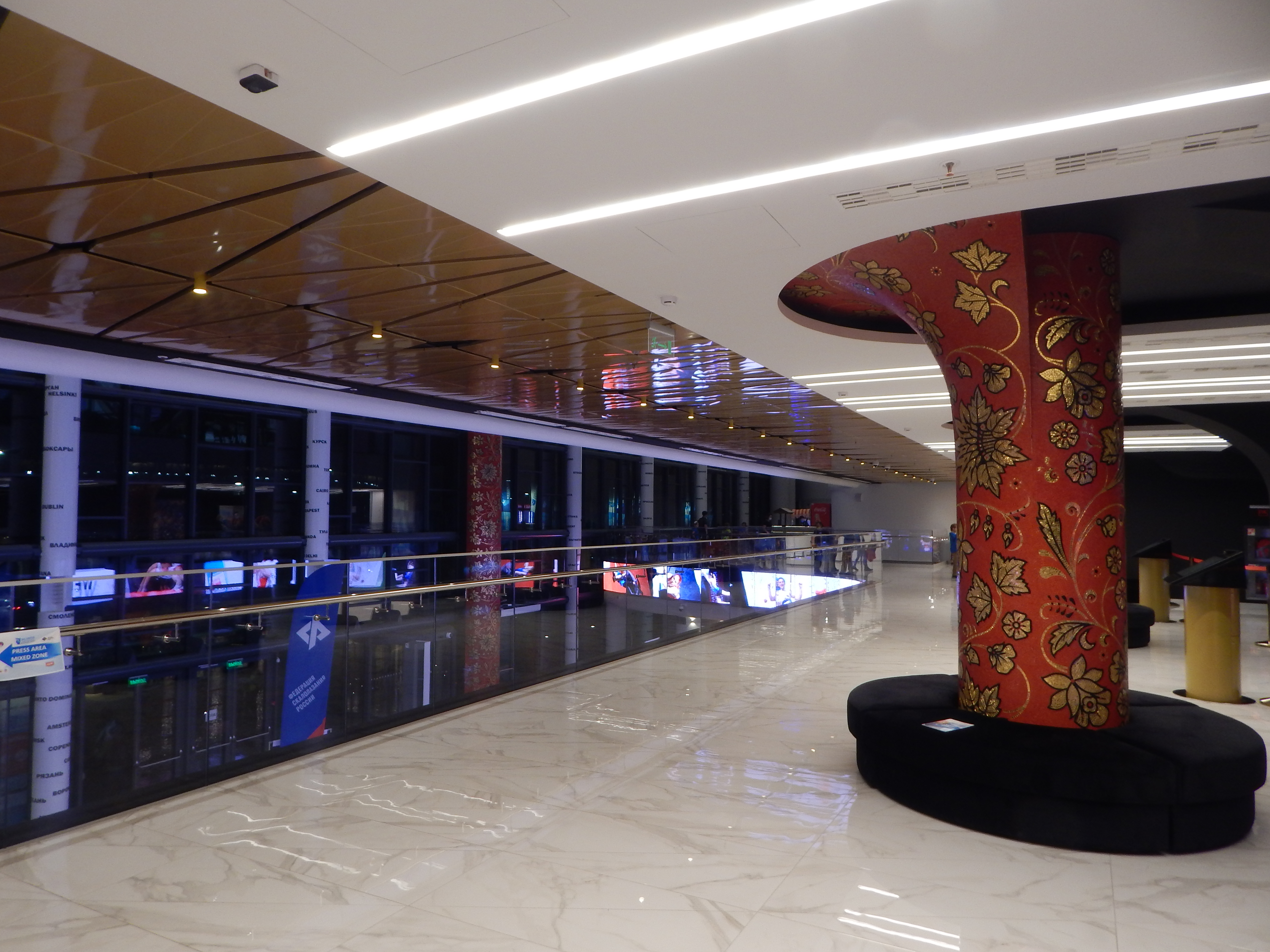
- Luzhniki Gymnastics Palace was held the competition
- Venue: Irina Viner-Usmanova Gymnastics Palace
- Location: Moscow, Russia
- Date: 20 – 28 November 2020
- Competitors: 95 athletes from 16 nations

The 2020 IFSC Climbing European Championships, the 13th edition, were held in Moscow, Russia from 20 to 28 November 2020. The championships consisted of lead, speed, bouldering, and combined events. The winners of the last event will automatically qualify for the 2020 Summer Olympics in Tokyo, Japan, where climbing will make its debut.

== Medals ==
* Host nation (Russia)

Rank	Nation	Gold	Silver	Bronze	Total
1	Russia (RUS)*	5	3	4	12
2	Switzerland (SUI)	1	1	0	2
3	Slovenia (SLO)	1	0	0	1
3	Ukraine (UKR)	1	0	0	1
5	Belgium (BEL)	0	2	0	2
6	Czech Republic (CZE)	0	1	1	2
6	Serbia (SRB)	0	1	1	2
8	Great Britain (GBR)	0	0	1	1
8	Poland (POL)	0	0	1	1
Totals (9 entries)		8	8	8	24

== Schedule ==
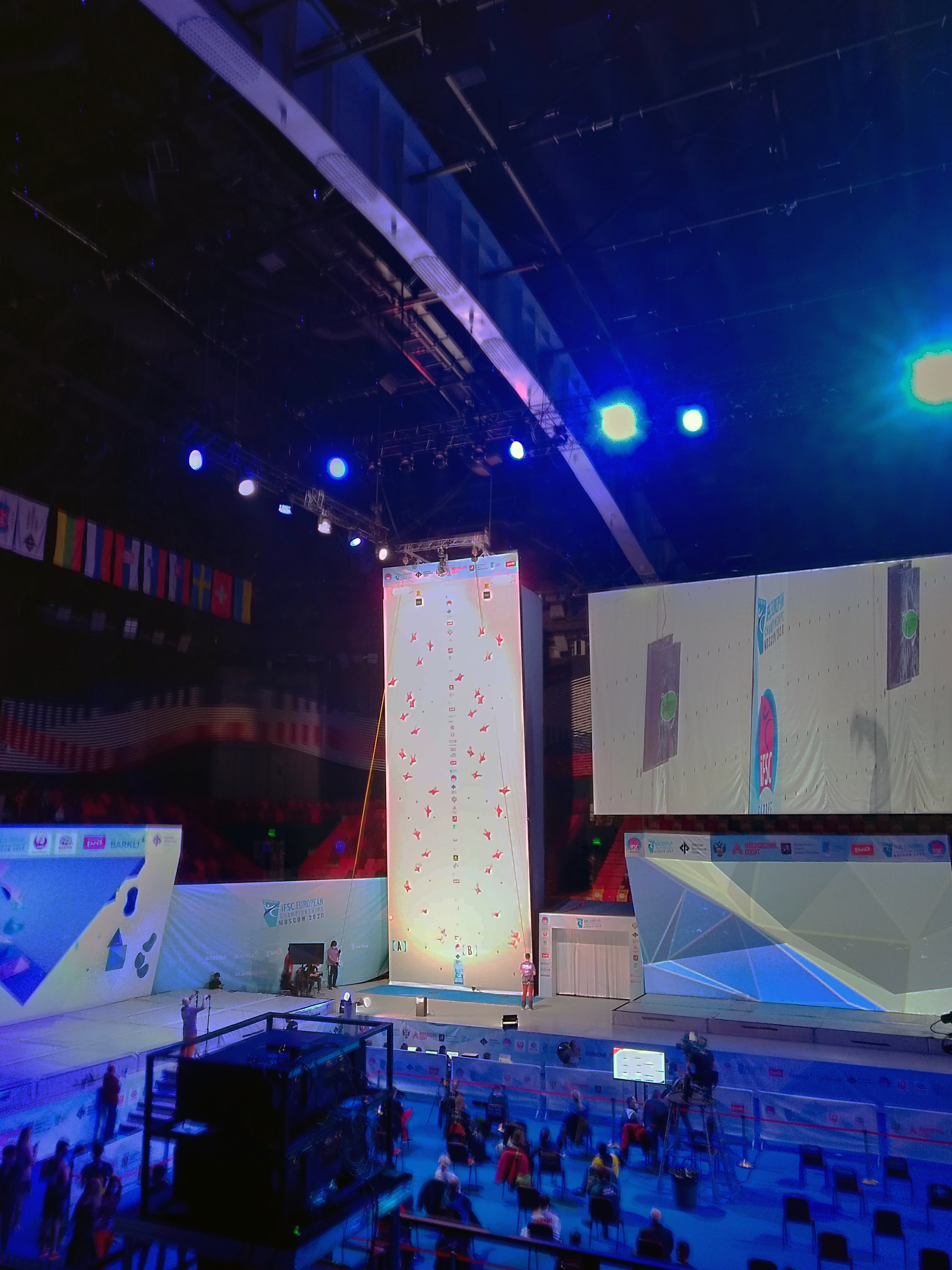
A competition stage, the speed climbing wall

A total of 16 Medal events were held across four disciplines.

●	Other competitions	●	Finals	M	Men's matches	W	Women's matches

November	21	22	23	24	25	26	27	28	Total
Speed	2								2
Boulder		●	2						2
Lead				●	2				2
Combined							●	2	2

== Qualification for the 2020 Summer Olympics ==
The best climber of the combined event automatically qualifies for the 2020 Summer Olympics, where sport climbing will make its debut.

The qualifiers for the 2020 Summer Olympics from the 2020 Championships Combined events are:

2020 Summer Olympic qualification
Men	Women
Alexey Rubtsov (RUS)	Viktoria Meshkova (RUS)

== Bouldering ==
=== Women ===
Rank	Name	Score
1	(Russia) Viktoria Meshkova	4T4z 6 5
2	(Belgium) Chloé Caulier	4T4z 6 6
3	(Serbia) Staša Gejo	2T4z 4 4
4	(Germany) Lucia Dörffel	2T3z 3 3
5	(Germany) Alma Bestvater	1T4z 2 9
6	(Germany) Afra Hönig	1T3z 4 4

=== Men ===
Rank	Name	Score
1	(Slovenia) Jernej Kruder	2T3z 2 3
2	(Russia) Sergey Luzhetsky	1T4z 3 8
3	(Russia) Nikolay Yerilovets	1T3z 2 7
4	(Israel) Ram Levin	1T3z 2 7
5	(Belgium) Nicolas Collin	1T3z 3 8
6	(Russia) Sergey Skorodumov	0T3z 0 4

== Lead ==
=== Women ===
Rank	Name	Score
1	(Russia) Viktoria Meshkova	36+ (3:53)
2	(Czech Republic) Eliška Adamovská	36+ (4:35)
3	(United Kingdom) Molly Thompson-Smith	31
4	(Germany) Hannah Meul	30+
5	(Russia) Olesya Prosekova	30
6	(Russia) Daria Mezentseva	28+
7	(Ukraine) Nika Potapova	18+
8	(Czech Republic) Markéta Janošová	11

=== Men ===
Rank	Name	Score
1	(Switzerland) Sascha Lehmann	41+
2	(Belgium) Nicolas Collin	38+
3	(Russia) Dmitry Fakiryanov	37+
4	(Israel) Nimrod Marcus	32+
5	(Sweden) Hannes Puman	34+
6	(Czech Republic) Martin Stráník	33+
7	(Slovenia) Anže Peharc	32+
8	(Russia) Vladislav Shevchenko	32+

== Speed ==
=== Women ===
Score Included are climbers who reached at least the quarterfinals. Yulia Kaplina set a new World Record in women's speed climbing (6.964).

Rank	Name	Last Score
1	(Russia) Ekaterina Barashchuk	7.37
2	(Russia) Elizaveta Ivanova	7.44
3	(Russia) Yulia Kaplina	7.05
4	(Poland) Aleksandra Kałucka	8.30
5	(Poland) Natalia Kałucka	7.82
6	(Poland) Patrycja Chudziak	7.87
7	(Switzerland) Petra Klingler	8.59
8	(Poland) Aleksandra Mirosław	FALL

=== Men ===
Score Included are climbers who reached at least the quarterfinals.

Rank	Name	Last Score
1	(Ukraine) Danyil Boldyrev	5.69
2	(Russia) Lev Rudatskiy	5.74
3	(Poland) Marcin Dzieński	5.59
4	(Russia) Vladislav Deulin	5.73
5	(Ukraine) Yaroslav Tkach	5.84
6	(Russia) Sergey Luzhetsky	6.33
7	(Russia) Dmitry Timofeev	FALL
8	(Russia) Aleksandr Shikov	FS

WC - Wildcard
FS – False start

== Combined ==
In combined competition, scoring is based on a multiplication formula, with points awarded by calculating the product of the three finishing ranks achieved in each discipline within the combined event. A competitor finishing with a first, a second and a sixth would thus be awarded 1 x 2 x 6 = 12 points, with the lowest scoring competitor winning.

=== Women ===
Rank	Name	Points	Speed		Bouldering		Lead	
Rank	Name	Points	Rank	Time	Rank	Score	Rank	Holds
1	(Russia) Viktoria Meshkova	12	2	fall	6	1t2z 1 5	1	top (4:00)
2	(Serbia) Staša Gejo	15	3	9.42	1	2t3z 3 5	5	25+
3	(Czech Republic) Eliška Adamovská	64	8	13.83	4	2t3z 5 8	2	top (5:03)
4	(Poland) Patrycja Chudziak	64	1	8.12	8	0t0z 0 0	8	13+
5	(Belgium) Chloé Caulier	70	5	10.45	2	2t3z 4 5	7	21+
6	(Russia) Elena Krasovskaia	72	4	10.30	3	2t3z 5 6	6	23+
7	(Germany) Hannah Meul	120	6	fall	5	2t2z 3 3	4	28+
8	(United Kingdom) Molly Thompson-Smith	147	7	12.79	7	1t1z 1 1	3	36+

=== Men ===
Rank	Name	Points	Speed		Bouldering		Lead	
Rank	Name	Points	Rank	Time	Rank	Score	Rank	Holds
1	(Russia) Alexey Rubtsov	20	5	7.37	1	3T3Z	4	35+
2	(Switzerland) Sascha Lehmann	24	4	7.36	3	2T3Z	2	Top (2:31)
3	(Russia) Sergey Luzhetsky	30	2	8.30	5	2T3Z	3	Top (2:51)
4	(Russia) Nikolay Yerilovets	36	3	6.69	2	2T3Z	6	33+
5	(Israel) Yuval Shemla	48	8	8.45	6	1T3Z	1	Top (2:20)
6	(Poland) Marcin Dzieński	64	1	5.85	8	0T0Z	8	8
7	(Israel) Alex Khazanov	196	7	8.15	4	2T3Z	7	26
8	(United Kingdom) William Bosi	210	6	7.91	7	0T3Z	5	35+

== See also ==
- IFSC Paraclimbing World Championships
- Sport climbing at the 2020 Summer Olympics
- 2021 IFSC Climbing World Championships
