= Nicolas Collin =

Belgian rock climber

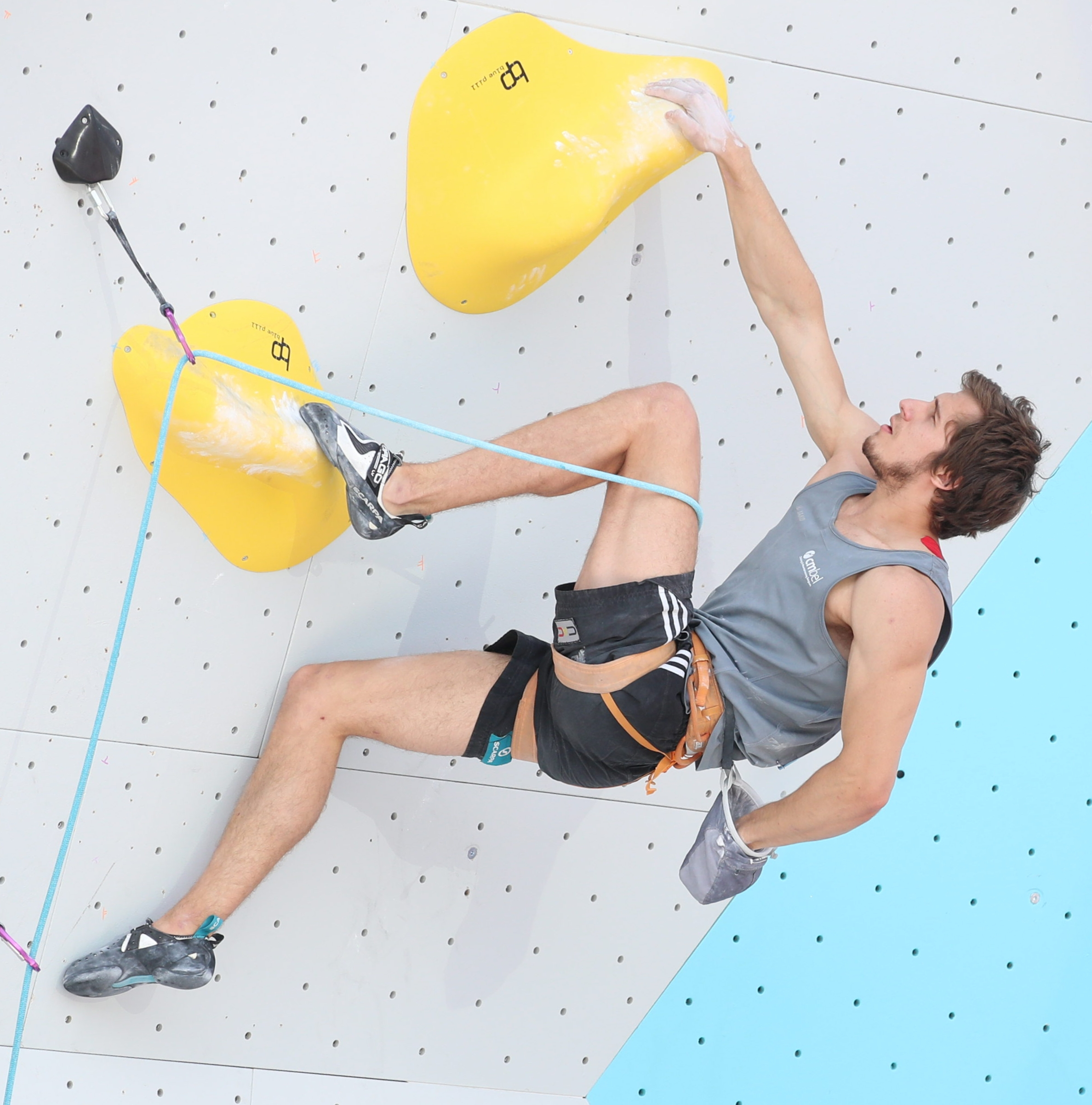

Personal information
- Born: 1998 (age 27–28)

Climbing career
- Type of climber: Competition climbing; Bouldering; Sport climbing
Medal record
World Games
Gold medal – first place	2022 Birmingham	Boulder
European Championships
Silver medal – second place	2020 Moscow	Lead

Nicolas Collin (born 1998) is a Belgian rock climber who specialises in competition climbing. He participated at the 2020 IFSC Climbing European Championships, being awarded the silver medal in the lead climbing event. At the 2022 World Games, he won the gold medal in the competition bouldering discipline.

== See also ==
- List of grade milestones in rock climbing
- History of rock climbing
- Rankings of most career IFSC gold medals
