= Sascha Lehmann =

Swiss rock climber

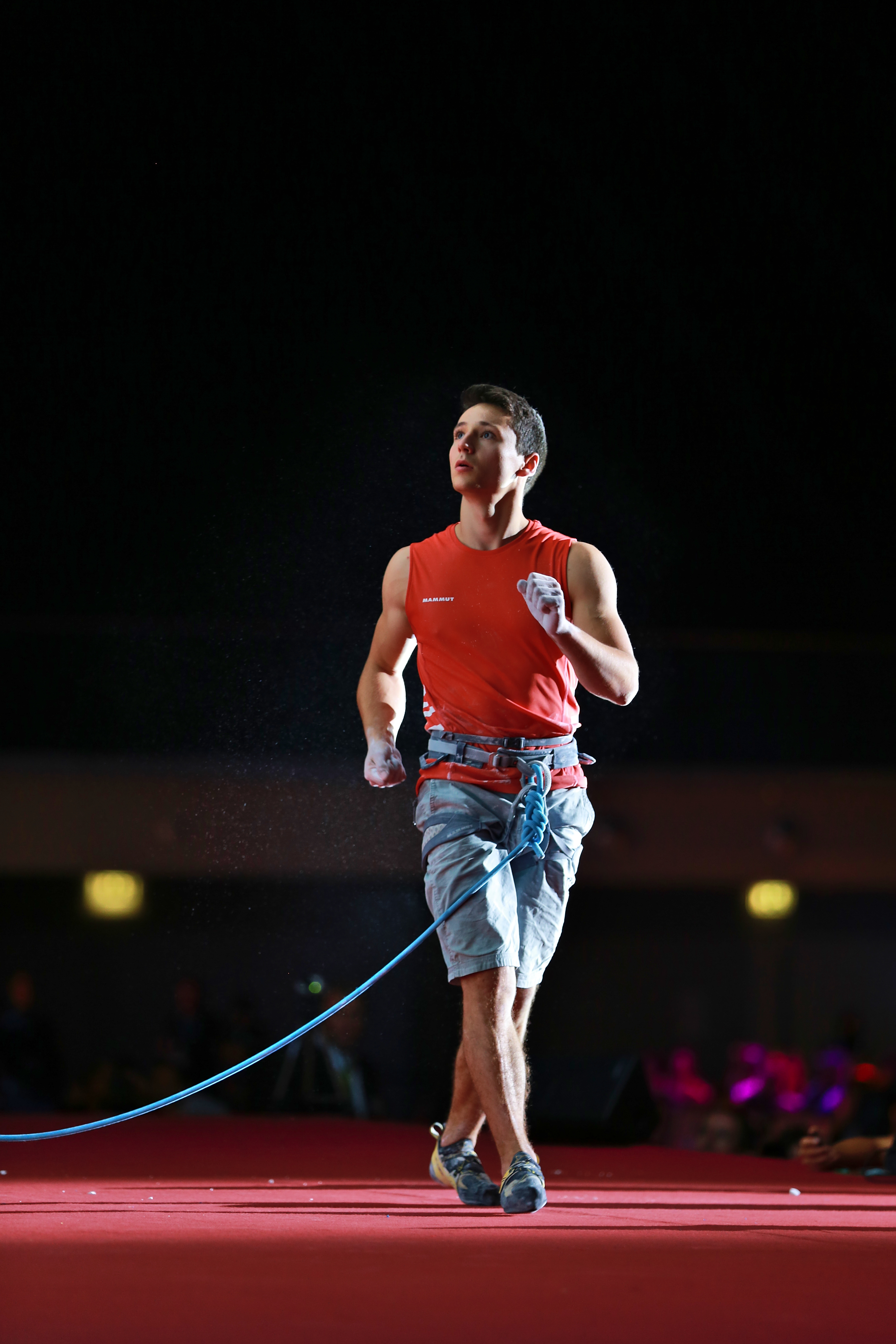
- Lehmann in 2018

Personal information
- Nationality: Switzerland
- Born: 3 February 1998 (age 28)
- Height: 164 cm (5 ft 5 in)

Climbing career
- Type of climber: Competition climbing

Sport
- Club: Schweizer Alpen-Club
Medal record
Men's competition climbing
Representing Switzerland
World Cup
Gold medal – first place	Villars 2019	Lead
Gold medal – first place	Innsbruck 2023	Lead
Silver medal – second place	Koper 2022	Lead
Bronze medal – third place	Innsbruck 2021	Lead
World Games
Gold medal – first place	Birmingham 2022	Lead
European Championships
Gold medal – first place	Moscow 2020	Lead
Gold medal – first place	Villars 2024	Lead
Silver medal – second place	Moscow 2020	Combined
Silver medal – second place	Villars 2024	Combined
Bronze medal – third place	Edinburgh 2019	Lead

Sascha Lehmann (born 3 February 1998) is a Swiss rock climber who specialises in competition climbing. He won the gold medal in the men's lead event at the 2022 World Games. He also won the lead event and finished second in the combined at the 2020 IFSC Climbing European Championships. He qualified for the boulder and lead combined event at the 2024 Summer Olympics through his results in the Olympic Qualifying Series.
