= World Climbing Europe Championship =

Biennial European championships for competitive climbing

- Status: active
- Genre: sporting event
- Date: mid-year
- Frequency: biennial
- Country: varying
- Inaugurated: 1992

The World Climbing Europe Championship, known until 2025 as the IFSC Climbing European Championships, are the biennial European championship for competition climbing organized by World Climbing. The first competition was held in Frankfurt in 1992.

== Championships ==
Number	Year	Location	Date(s)	Disciplines				Notes	Results
Number	Year	Location	Date(s)	lead	speed	boulder	combined	Notes	Results
1	1992	(Germany) Frankfurt	September 18	•	•	-	-		
2	1996	(France) Paris	January 28	•	•	-	-		
3	1998	(Germany) Nuremberg	April 3	•	•	-	-		
4	2000	(Germany) Munich	October 7	•	•	-	-		
5	2002	(France) Chamonix	July 11–14	•	•	•	-		
6	2004	(Italy) Lecco	June 21–27	•	•	•	-		
7	2006	(Russia) Yekaterinburg	June 29 – July 3	•	•	canceled	-		
7	2007^{1}	(United Kingdom) Birmingham	March 16–18	-	-	•	-		
8	2008	(France) Paris	October 15–18	•	•	•	-		
9	2010	(Austria) Imst/Innsbruck	September 14–18	•	•	•	-		
10	2013	(France) Chamonix	July 12–13	•	•	-	-		
10	2013	(Netherlands) Eindhoven	August 31 – September 1	-	-	•	-		
11	2015	(Austria) Innsbruck	May 14–16	-	-	•	-		
11	2015	(France) Chamonix	July 10–12	•	•	-	-		
12	2017	(Italy) Campitello di Fassa	June 30 – July 1	•	•	-	-		
12	2017	(Germany) Munich	August 18–19	-	-	•	-		
13	2019	(Poland) Zakopane	September 5–7	-	-	•	-		
13	2019	(United Kingdom) Edinburgh	October 4–6	•	•	-	-		
14	2020	(Russia) Moscow	November 21–28	•	•	•	•		
15	2022	(Germany) Munich	August 11–21	•	•	•	•		
16	2024	(Switzerland) Villars-sur-Ollon	August 27 – September 1	•	•	•	•		
17	2026	(Spain) Barcelona	July 17–19	-	-	•	-		
17	2026	(France) Laval	August 28–30	•	•	-	-		

^{1} EC 2007 Birmingham was the replacement for the canceled EC 2006 Yekaterinburg (boulder)

== Men's results ==
=== Lead ===
Year	Gold	Silver	Bronze
1992	(France) François Legrand	(France) François Petit	(Russia) Salavat Rakhmetov
1996	(France) Arnaud Petit	(France) François Petit	(France) François Lombard
1998	(United Kingdom) Ian Vickers	(Italy) Cristian Brenna	(Germany) Christian Bindhammer
2000	(France) Alexandre Chabot	(Italy) Cristian Brenna	(Russia) Evgeny Ovchinnikov
2002	(France) Alexandre Chabot	(Czech Republic) Tomáš Mrázek	(Spain) Ramón Julián Puigblanqué
2004	(Spain) Ramón Julián Puigblanqué	(France) Alexandre Chabot	(France) François Auclair
2006	(Austria) David Lama	(Switzerland) Cédric Lachat	(Russia) Dmitri Sarafutdinov
2008	(Spain) Patxi Usobiaga Lakunza	(Czech Republic) Tomáš Mrázek	(France) Manuel Romain
2010	(Spain) Ramón Julián Puigblanqué	(Czech Republic) Adam Ondra	(Austria) Jakob Schubert
2013	(France) Romain Desgranges	(Spain) Ramón Julián Puigblanque	(Netherlands) Jorg Verhoeven
2015	(Spain) Ramón Julián Puigblanque	(Czech Republic) Adam Ondra	(Germany) Sebastian Halenke
2017	(France) Romain Desgranges	(Czech Republic) Adam Ondra	(Austria) Jakob Schubert
2019	(Czech Republic) Adam Ondra	(Spain) Alberto Ginés López	(Switzerland) Sasha Lehmann
2020	(Switzerland) Sasha Lehmann	(Belgium) Nicolas Collin	(Russia) Dmitrii Fakirianov
2022	(Czech Republic) Adam Ondra	(Slovenia) Luka Potočar	(Spain) Alberto Ginés López
2024	(Switzerland) Sasha Lehmann	(France) Sam Avezou	(Spain) Guillermo Peinado Franganillo
2026	(Spain) Alberto Ginés López	(Italy) Giovanni Placci	(France) Sam Avezou

=== Bouldering ===
Year	Gold	Silver	Bronze
2002	(Italy) Christian Core	(Italy) Mauro Calibani	(Russia) Salavat Rakhmetov
2004	(France) Daniel Dulac	(United Kingdom) Andrew Earl	(Italy) Gabriele Moroni
2007	(Austria) David Lama	(Finland) Nalle Hukkataival	(Czech Republic) Tomáš Mrázek
2008	(France) Jérôme Meyer	(Austria) Kilian Fischhuber	(Switzerland) Cédric Lachat
2010	(Switzerland) Cédric Lachat	(Czech Republic) Adam Ondra	(Austria) Kilian Fischhuber
2013	(Austria) Kilian Fischhuber	(Russia) Dmitri Sarafutdinov	(Austria) Jakob Schubert
2015	(Germany) Jan Hojer	(Czech Republic) Adam Ondra	(Italy) Stefan Scarperi
2017	(Germany) Jan Hojer	(Germany) Alexander Megos	(Slovenia) Anže Peharc
2019	(France) Mickaël Mawem	(Russia) Sergei Skorodumov	(Russia) Vadim Timonov
2020	(Slovenia) Jernej Kruder	(Russia) Sergei Luzhetskii	(Russia) Nikolai Iarilovets
2022	(Austria) Nicolai Uznik	(France) Sam Avezou	(Czech Republic) Adam Ondra
2024	(France) Sam Avezou	(United Kingdom) Maximillian Milne	(United Kingdom) Dayan Akhtar
2026	(United Kingdom) Maximillian Milne	(Belgium) Hannes Van Duysen	(France) Samuel Richard

=== Speed ===
Year	Gold	Silver	Bronze
1992	(Kazakhstan) Kairat Rakhmetov	(Italy) Cristian Brenna	(Poland) Andrzej Marcisz
1996	(Ukraine) Andrey Vedenmeer	(France) Mathieu Dutray	(Russia) Pavel Samoiline
1998	(Poland) Tomasz Oleksy	(Ukraine) Alexander Paukaev	(Ukraine) Vladimir Zakharov
2000	(Ukraine) Maksym Styenkovyy	(Russia) Iakov Soubbotine	(Russia) Alexander Chaoulsky
2002	(Ukraine) Maksym Styenkovyy	(Russia) Sergey Sinitcyn	(Russia) Alexei Gadeev
2004	(Russia) Alexander Peshekhonov	(Ukraine) Maksym Styenkovyy	(Russia) Alexander Chaoulsky
2006	(Russia) Evgeny Vaitcekhovsky	(Russia) Sergey Sinitcyn	(Russia) Alexander Peshekhonov
2008	(Russia) Evgeny Vaitcekhovsky	(Ukraine) Maksym Osipov	(Ukraine) Maksym Styenkovyy
2010	(Russia) Sergey Abdrakhmanov	(Russia) Stanislav Kokorin	(Czech Republic) Libor Hroza
2013	(Czech Republic) Libor Hroza	(Poland) Marcin Dzieński	(Ukraine) Danyil Boldyrev
2015	(Czech Republic) Libor Hroza	(Ukraine) Danyil Boldyrev	(Poland) Marcin Dzieński
2017	(Poland) Marcin Dzieński	(Ukraine) Danyil Boldyrev	(Russia) Stanislav Kokorin
2019	(Russia) Vladislav Deulin	(Ukraine) Danyil Boldyrev	(Russia) Dimitrii Timofeev
2020	(Ukraine) Danyil Boldyrev	(Russia) Lev Rudatskiy	(Poland) Marcin Dzieński
2022	(Ukraine) Danyil Boldyrev	(Poland) Marcin Dzieński	(France) Guillaume Moro
2024	(Italy) Ludovico Fossali	(Italy) Matteo Zurloni	(Spain) Erik Noya Cardona
2026	(Individual Neutral Athletes) Petr Zemliakov	(France) Marceau Garnier	(Individual Neutral Athletes) Ivan Zemliakov

=== Overall ===
Year	Gold	Silver	Bronze
2015	(Austria) Jakob Schubert	(Italy) Stefano Ghisolfi	(Spain) Javier Cano Blázquez
2017	(Germany) Jan Hojer	(Austria) Jakob Schubert	(Italy) Michael Piccolruaz
2020	(Russia) Alexey Rubtsov	(Switzerland) Sascha Lehmann	(Russia) Sergey Luzhetsky
2022	(Austria) Jakob Schubert	(Czech Republic) Adam Ondra	(Spain) Alberto Ginés López
2024	(France) Sam Avezou	(Switzerland) Sasha Lehmann	(Switzerland) Jonas Utelli

== Women's results ==
=== Lead ===
Year	Gold	Silver	Bronze
1992	(Switzerland) Susi Good	(France) Isabelle Patissier	(France) Laurence Guyon
1996	(France) Liv Sansoz	(France) Laurence Guyon	(France) Stéphanie Bodet (Russia) Venera Chereshneva
1998	(Belgium) Muriel Sarkany	(Russia) Venera Chereshneva	(France) Liv Sansoz
2000	(Germany) Katrin Sedlmayer	(France) Stéphanie Bodet	(Germany) Marietta Uhden
2002	(France) Chloé Minoret	(Slovenia) Martina Čufar	(France) Sandrine Levet (Belgium) Muriel Sarkany
2004	(Austria) Bettina Schöpf	(Slovenia) Natalija Gros	(Austria) Katharina Saurwein
2006	(France) Charlotte Durif	(France) Sandrine Levet	(Slovenia) Maja Vidmar
2008	(Austria) Johanna Ernst	(Slovenia) Maja Vidmar	(Slovenia) Mina Markovič
2010	(Austria) Angela Eiter	(Austria) Johanna Ernst	(France) Alizée Dufraisse
2013	(Russia) Dinara Fakhritdinova	(Slovenia) Mina Markovič	(France) Hélène Janicot
2015	(Slovenia) Mina Markovič	(Slovenia) Janja Garnbret	(Austria) Jessica Pilz
2017	(Belgium) Anak Verhoeven	(Slovenia) Mina Markovič	(Austria) Jessica Pilz
2019	(Slovenia) Lučka Rakovec	(Italy) Laura Rogora	(France) Luce Douady
2020	(Russia) Viktoriia Meshkova	(Czech Republic) Eliška Adamovská	(United Kingdom) Molly Thompson-Smith
2022	(Slovenia) Janja Garnbret	(Austria) Jessica Pilz	(France) Manon Hily
2024	(Italy) Laura Rogora	(Ukraine) Ievgeniia Kazbekova	(Netherlands) Lynn Van Der Meer
2026	(United Kingdom) Erin McNeice	(Belgium) Heloïse Doumont	(Slovenia) Lučka Rakovec

=== Bouldering ===
Year	Gold	Silver	Bronze
2002	(France) Sandrine Levet	(France) Fanny Rogeaux	(Czech Republic) Vera Kotasova-Kostruhova
2004	(Russia) Olga Bibik	(Austria) Anna Stöhr	(France) Corinne Theroux
2007	(France) Juliette Danion	(Ukraine) Olga Shalagina	(Ukraine) Olga Bezhko
2008	(Slovenia) Natalija Gros	(Austria) Anna Stöhr	(Norway) Hannah Midtboe
2010	(Austria) Anna Stöhr	(Germany) Juliane Wurm	(Ukraine) Olga Shalagina
2013	(Austria) Anna Stöhr	(Slovenia) Mina Markovič	(France) Mélanie Sandoz
2015	(Germany) Juliane Wurm	(Austria) Anna Stöhr	(Austria) Katharina Saurwein
2017	(Serbia) Staša Gejo	(Slovenia) Janja Garnbret	(Switzerland) Petra Klingler
2019	(Slovenia) Urska Repusic	(Slovenia) Vita Lukan	(Russia) Irina Kuzmenko
2020	(Russia) Viktoriia Meshkova	(Belgium) Chloe Caulier	(Serbia) Staša Gejo
2022	(Slovenia) Janja Garnbret	(Germany) Hannah Meul	(France) Oriane Bertone
2024	(France) Naïlé Meignan	(Israel) Ayala Kerem	(France) Agathe Calliet
2026	(France) Oriane Bertone	(France) Zélia Avezou	(Italy) Camilla Moroni

=== Speed ===
Year	Gold	Silver	Bronze
1992	(Russia) Yelena Ovchinnikova	(Russia) Yulia Inozemtseva	(France) Claudine Trecourt
1996	(France) Cecile Avezou	(Germany) Ameli Haager	(Belgium) Kim Anthoni
1998	(France) Cecile Avezou	(Ukraine) Olena Ryepko	(Russia) Zosia Podgorbounskikh
2000	(Ukraine) Olena Ryepko	(Russia) Tatiana Ruyga	(Russia) Zosia Podgorbounskikh
2002	(Ukraine) Olena Ryepko	(Ukraine) Olga Zakharova	(Russia) Svetlana Sutkina
2004	(Russia) Anna Stenkovaya	(Russia) Valentina Yurina	(Russia) Maya Piratinskaya
2006	(Russia) Anna Stenkovaya	(Russia) Kseniia Alekseeva	(Russia) Valentina Yurina
2008	(Poland) Edyta Ropek	(Russia) Olga Morozkina	(Russia) Anna Stenkovaya
2010	(Poland) Edyta Ropek	(Russia) Kseniia Alekseeva	(Russia) Natalia Titova
2013	(Russia) Anna Tsyganova	(Poland) Aleksandra Rudzińska	(Russia) Yulia Levochkina
2015	(France) Anouck Jaubert	(Russia) Yulia Kaplina	(Russia) Maria Krasavina
2017	(Russia) Yulia Kaplina	(Russia) Anna Tsyganova	(Russia) Elena Remizova
2019	(Poland) Aleksandra Mirosław	(Russia) Mariia Krasavina	(France) Anouck Jaubert
2020	(Russia) Ekaterina Barashchuk	(Russia) Elizaveta Ivanova	(Russia) Yulia Kaplina
2022	(Poland) Aleksandra Mirosław	(Poland) Aleksandra Kałucka	(Poland) Natalia Kałucka
2024	(Poland) Natalia Kałucka	(Poland) Patrycja Chudziak	(Italy) Giulia Randi
2026	(Italy) Beatrice Colli	(Individual Neutral Athletes) Elizaveta Ivanova	(Poland) Aleksandra Mirosław

=== Overall ===
Year	Gold	Silver	Bronze
2015	(Austria) Jessica Pilz	(Slovenia) Mina Markovič	(France) Charlotte Durif
2017	(Slovenia) Janja Garnbret	(Switzerland) Petra Klingler	(Serbia) Staša Gejo
2020	(Russia) Viktoria Meshkova	(Serbia) Staša Gejo	(Czech Republic) Eliska Adamovska
2022	(Slovenia) Janja Garnbret	(Slovenia) Mia Krampl	(Austria) Jessica Pilz
2024	(Italy) Laura Rogora	(Ukraine) Ievgeniia Kazbekova	(France) Zélia Avezou

== Medals (1992–2026) ==
Rank	Nation	Gold	Silver	Bronze	Total
1	France	21	13	22	56
2	Russia	17	19	28	64
3	Austria	12	7	9	28
4	Slovenia	9	12	4	25
5	Ukraine	7	11	5	23
6	Poland	7	5	5	17
7	Italy	5	8	5	18
8	Germany	5	4	3	12
9	Spain	5	2	6	13
10	Czech Republic	4	9	5	18
11	Switzerland	4	4	4	12
12	Great Britain	3	2	2	7
13	Belgium	2	4	2	8
14	Serbia	1	1	2	4
15	Individual Neutral Athletes	1	1	1	3
16	Kazakhstan	1	0	0	1
17	Finland	0	1	0	1
17	Israel	0	1	0	1
19	Netherlands	0	0	2	2
20	Norway	0	0	1	1
Totals (20 entries)		104	104	106	314

- 1996 and 2002 two bronze were shared in women lead.

== See also ==
- World Climbing Series
- World Climbing Championship
- IFSC Paraclimbing World Championships
- IFSC Climbing World Youth Championships
- Nordic Bouldering and Lead Climbing Championships
