= Staša Gejo =

Serbian rock climber

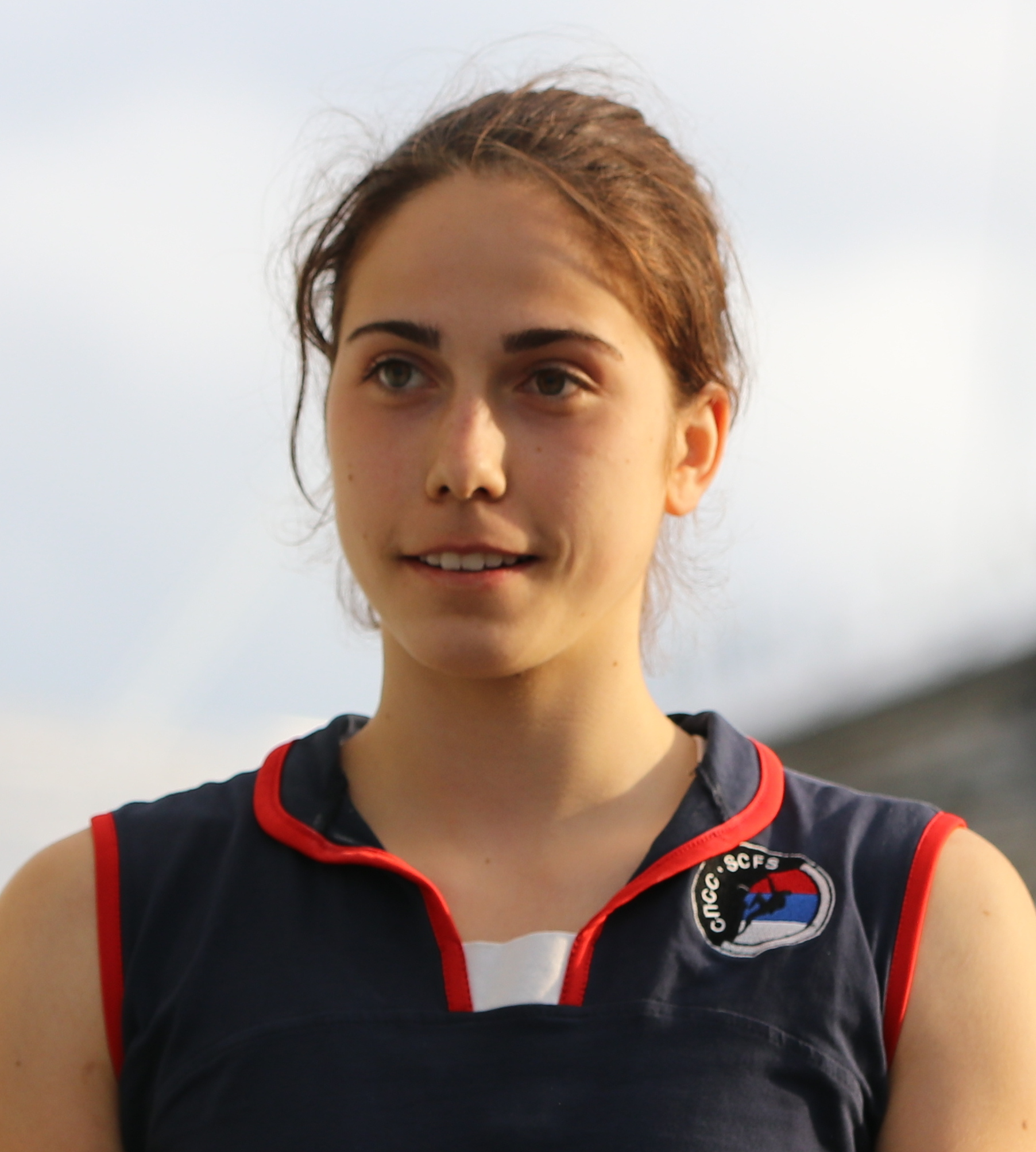
- Gejo at the 2017 Boulder Worldcup in Munich

Personal information
- Nationality: Serbian
- Born: November 25, 1997 (age 28) Niš, FR Yugoslavia
- Height: 175 cm (5 ft 9 in)
- Weight: 57–69 kg (126–152 lb)

Climbing career
- Type of climber: Competition bouldering
- Known for: 2015 World Junior Champion Bouldering and Combined; 2017 World Games Champion Bouldering; 2017 European Champion Bouldering
Medal record
Women's competition climbing
Representing Serbia
Event	1st	2nd	3rd
World Games	1	-	-
World Championship	-	-	2
European Championship	1	1	2
World Games
Gold medal – first place	2017 Wrocław	Bouldering
World Championships
Bronze medal – third place	2018 Innsbruck	Bouldering
Bronze medal – third place	2021 Moscow	Bouldering
European Championships
Gold medal – first place	2017 Munich	Bouldering
Silver medal – second place	2020 Moscow	Combined
Bronze medal – third place	2017 Munich	Combined
Bronze medal – third place	2020 Moscow	Bouldering
World Youth Championships
Gold medal – first place	2015 Arco	Junior Combined
Gold medal – first place	2015 Arco	Junior Bouldering
European Youth Championships
Gold medal – first place	2016 Langenfeld	Junior Bouldering
Gold medal – first place	2015 L'Argentière- la-Bessée	Junior Bouldering
Silver medal – second place	2014 Edinburgh	Youth A Bouldering
Bronze medal – third place	2013 Grindelwald	Youth A Bouldering
Silver medal – second place	2012 Gémozac	Youth B Lead

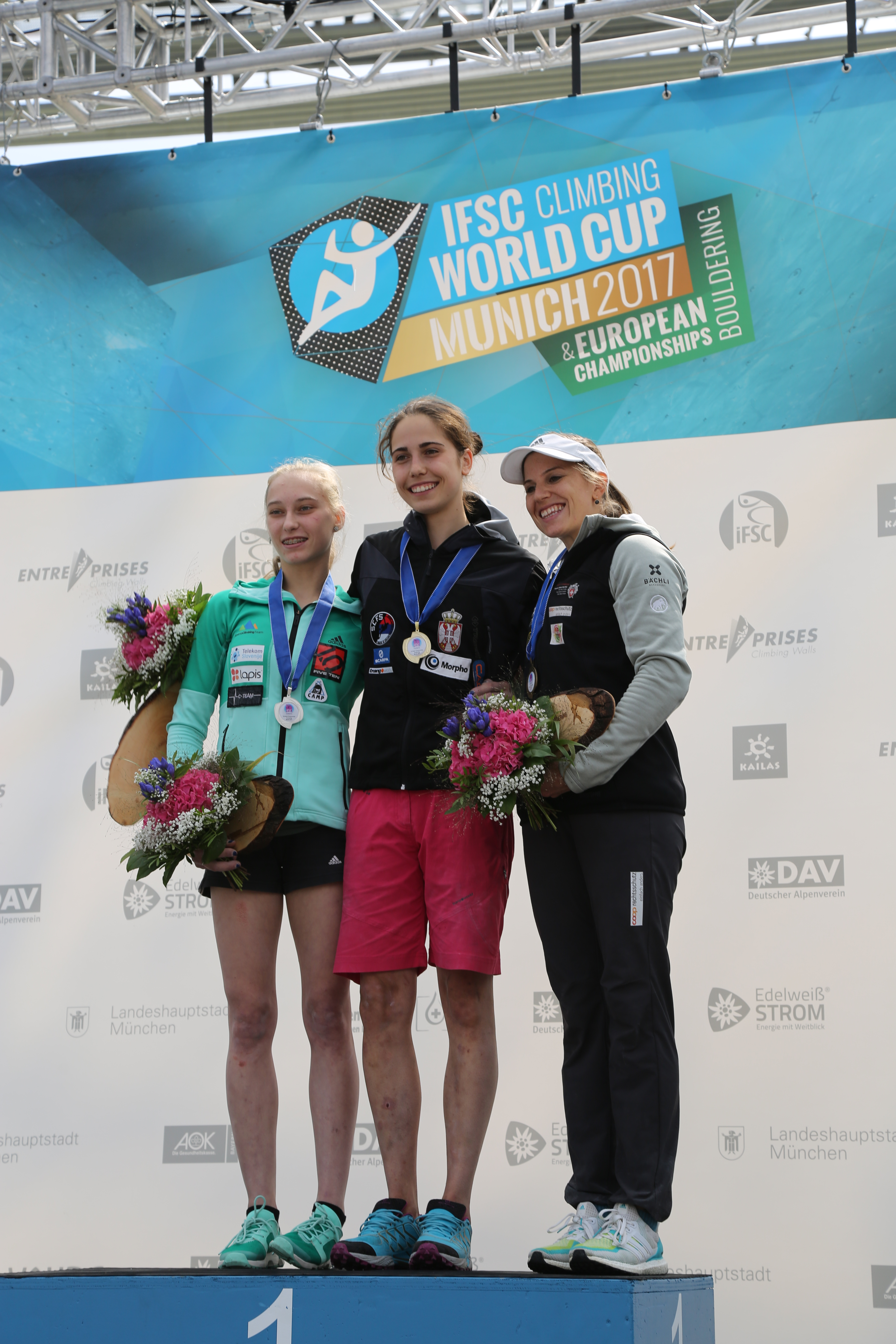
Gejo at the 2017 European Champion in Bouldering – with Janja Garnbret in second and Petra Klingler in third place

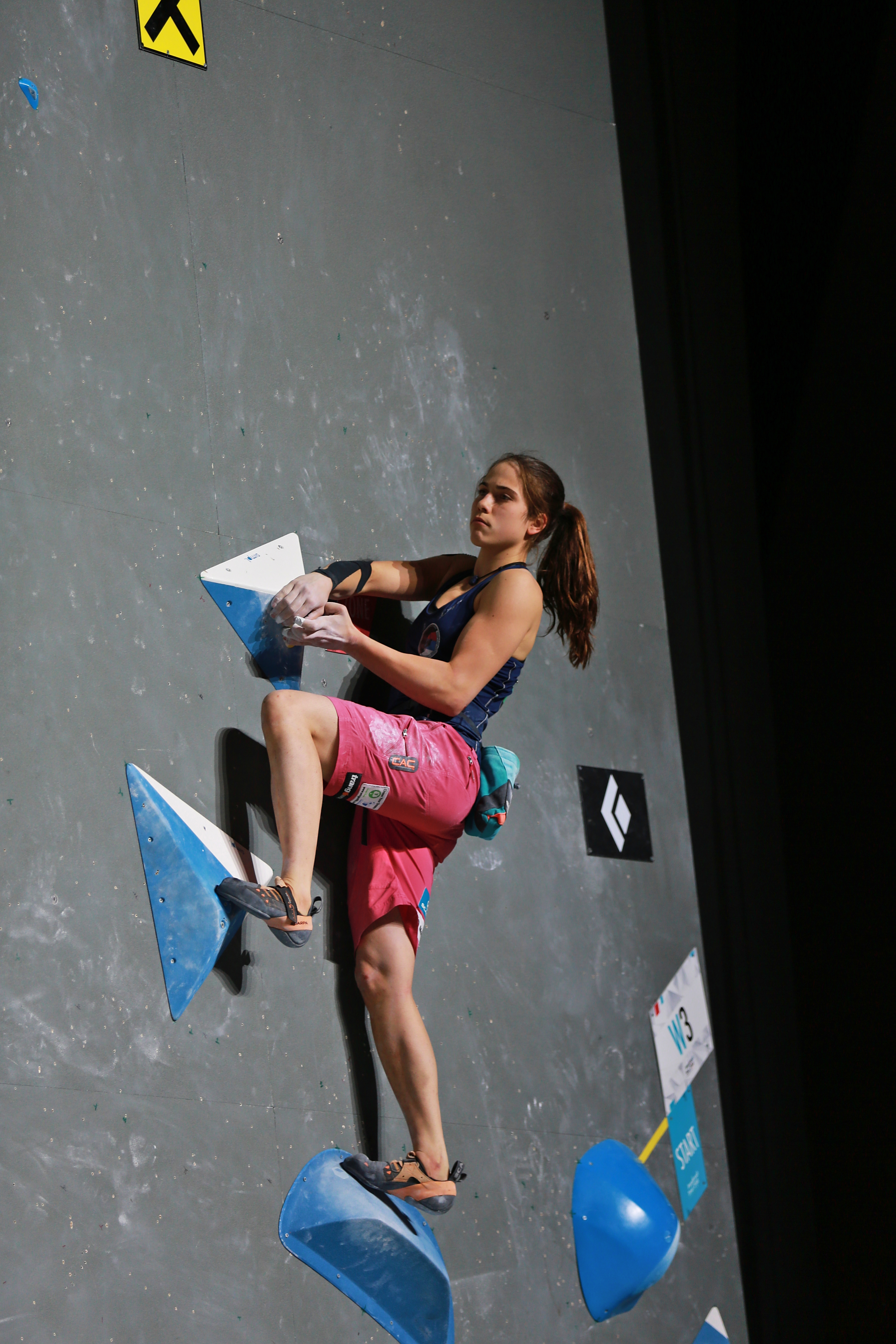
Climbing at the finals of the 2018 Boulder Climbing World Championship

Staša Gejo (Serbian Cyrillic: Сташа Гејо; born 25 November 1997) is a Serbian rock climber who specializes in competition climbing. She was the 2015 World Junior Champion in both competition bouldering and the combined event. In the senior category, she won the 2017 World Games in bouldering. She was the 2017 European champion in bouldering and came in third in combined scoring. In 2018 and 2021, she came in third at the World Championships in bouldering.

== Rankings ==
=== Climbing World Cup ===
Discipline	2015	2016	2017	2018
Lead	-	-	42	35
Bouldering	24	18	6	6
Speed	-	-	-	63
Combined	-	-	19	5

=== Climbing World Championships ===
Youth

Discipline	2012 Youth B	2013 Youth A	2015 Junior	2016 Junior
Lead	4	20	10	-
Bouldering	-	-	1	7
Speed	10	-	13	-
Combined	-	-	1	-

Adult

Discipline	2014	2016	2018	2021
Lead	-	-	38	-
Bouldering	49	7	3	3
Speed	-	-	35	-
Combined	-	-	7	-

=== Climbing European Championships ===
Youth

Discipline	2012 Youth B	2013 Youth A	2014 Youth A	2015 Junior	2016 Junior
Lead	2	19	6	-	-
Bouldering	-	3	2	1	1
Speed	5	10	5	-	-
Combined	-	-	-	-	-

Adult

Discipline	2015	2017	2020
Lead	-	30	11
Bouldering	14	1	3
Speed	-	41	11
Combined	-	3	2
