= Boulder & Lead Japan Cup 2023 =

Annual competition climbing event

- Venue: Tottori Prefectural Kurayoshi Sports and Culture Hall
- Location: Kurayoshi, Tottori, Japan
- Date: 8 – 9 April 2023
- Website: https://www.jma-climbing.org/competition/2023/bljc/

Medalists
gold medal	Sorato Anraku / Ai Mori
silver medal	Ao Yurikusa / Anon Matsufuji
bronze medal	Yoshiyuki Ogata / Miho Nonaka

The 2023 Boulder & Lead Japan Cup (BLJC2023) was a competition combined climbing event organised by the Japan Mountaineering and Sport Climbing Association (JMSCA), held at the Tottori Prefectural Kurayoshi Sports and Culture Hall, Tottori.

BLJC2023 served as a selection event for Japan's Paris Olympics training athlete group for Sport Climbing, with the top 2 athletes securing their berths for the 2023 IFSC Climbing World Championships in the boulder & lead discipline. BLJC2023 was the first domestic combined competition of the 2023 season. 32 men and 33 women competed, with Sorato Anraku and Ai Mori winning the men's and women's titles respectively.

== Results ==
=== Finals ===
The men's Boulder & Lead finals took place on 9 April 2023.

Rank	Name	Boulder					Lead	Total		
Rank	Name	1	2	3	4	Σ	Lead	Total		
Rank	Name	1st place, gold medalist(s)	Sorato Anraku	25.0	0.0	25.0	24.8	74.8	100.0	174.8
2nd place, silver medalist(s)	Ao Yurikusa	24.8	0.0	24.8	24.9	74.5	92.0	166.5		
3rd place, bronze medalist(s)	Yoshiyuki Ogata	25.0	24.7	10.0	24.9	84.6	64.1	148.7		
4	Ritsu Kayotani	24.9	0.0	24.8	25.0	74.7	64.0	138.7		
5	Kokoro Fujii	24.7	0.0	24.9	24.9	74.5	64.0	138.5		
6	Satone Yoshida	24.9	0.0	10.0	9.7	44.6	92.0	136.6		
7	Yuji Fujiwaki	24.7	0.0	25.0	24.6	74.3	57.1	131.4		
8	Katsura Konishi	3.8	0.0	10.0	10.0	23.8	64.0	87.8		

The women's Boulder & Lead finals took place on 9 April 2023.

Rank	Name	Boulder					Lead	Total		
Rank	Name	1	2	3	4	Σ	Lead	Total		
Rank	Name	1st place, gold medalist(s)	Ai Mori	25.0	24.7	4.7	24.8	79.2	100.0	179.2
2nd place, silver medalist(s)	Ryu Nakagawa	25.0	24.9	24.9	25.0	99.8	39.1	138.9		
3rd place, bronze medalist(s)	Miho Nonaka	25.0	10.0	24.8	24.9	84.7	48.1	132.8		
4	Futaba Ito	25.0	24.9	4.8	24.9	79.6	48.1	127.7		
5	Hana Koike	24.9	9.5	0.0	24.9	59.3	64.0	123.3		
6	Ryu Nakagawa	25.0	9.3	4.8	24.8	58.9	60.1	119.0		
7	Nonoha Kume	25.0	3.8	0.0	24.7	53.5	51.1	104.6		
8	Michika Nagashima	25.0	5.0	4.7	10.0	44.7	48.1	92.8		

=== Qualifications ===
The men's Boulder & Lead qualifications took place on 8 April 2023.

Rank	Name	Boulder					Lead	Total	Notes			
Rank	Name	1	2	3	4	Σ	Lead	Total	Notes			
Rank	Name	1	Yoshiyuki Ogata	24.7	25.0	25.0	10.0	84.7	Notes	100.0	184.7	Q
2	Sorato Anraku	25.0	24.8	9.6	24.9	84.3	100.0	184.3	Q			
3	Ritsu Kayotani	25.0	9.2	24.9	25.0	84.1	100.0	184.1	Q			
4	Kokoro Fujii	24.9	24.7	24.6	9.7	83.9	100.0	183.9	Q			
5	Ao Yurikusa	25.0	24.6	9.7	4.9	64.2	96.0	160.2	Q			
6	Yuji Fujiwaki	25.0	24.5	9.6	4.6	63.7	96.1	159.8	Q			
7	Satone Yoshida	24.4	9.6	24.9	0.0	58.9	100.0	158.9	Q			
8	Katsura Konishi	25.0	9.3	25.0	0.0	59.3	92.1	151.4	Q			
9	Meichi Narasaki	24.7	0.0	25.0	4.6	54.3	96.1	150.4				
10	Tomoa Narasaki	25.0	9.1	25.0	0.0	59.1	88.0	147.1				
11	Sohta Amagasa	25.0	10.0	9.8	4.3	44.1	100.0	144.1				
12	Shion Omata	24.9	4.4	4.2	0.0	33.5	100.0	133.5				
13	Tomoaki Takata	25.0	10.0	0.0	4.9	39.9	92.1	132.0				
14	Keita Dohi	24.8	25.0	24.9	0.0	74.7	54.0	128.7				
15	Rei Sugimoto	24.9	4.0	24.7	9.9	63.5	64.0	127.5				
16	Hiroto Shimizu	24.9	4.3	4.9	0.0	34.1	92.1	126.2				
17	Manato Kurashiki	10.0	9.8	8.9	0.0	28.7	96.1	124.8				
18	Masahiro Higuchi	25.0	9.6	24.9	0.0	59.5	60.1	119.6				
19	Zento Murashita	10.0	4.5	0.0	0.0	14.5	100.0	114.5				
20	Rei Kawamata	24.8	10.0	25.0	0.0	59.8	54.1	113.9				
21	Ryohei Kameyama	25.0	9.6	24.8	4.6	64.0	48.0	112.0				
22	Kento Yamaguchi	25.0	9.8	9.4	0.0	44.2	64.1	108.3				
23	Yusuke Sugimoto	25.0	9.8	9.5	4.6	49.0	54.1	103.3				
24	Reo Matsuoka	25.0	4.5	9.3	0.0	38.8	60.1	98.9				
25	Junta Sekiguchi	10.0	0.0	24.9	0.0	34.9	60.1	95.0				
26	Mahiro Takami	25.0	0.0	4.1	0.0	29.1	60.1	89.2				
27	Taito Nakagami	10.0	4.5	0.0	0.0	14.5	68.1	82.6				
28	Yuya Kitae	10.0	9.4	9.4	0.0	28.8	51.1	79.9				
29	Hayato Tsuru	24.8	0.0	4.9	0.0	29.7	45.1	74.8				
30	Ryoei Nukui	9.9	0.0	9.2	0.0	19.1	48.1	67.2				
31	Yo Masuda	9.5	4.5	4.8	0.0	18.8	33.1	51.9				
32	Toru Kofukuda	10.0	0.0	10.0	0.0	20.0	20.1	40.1				

The women's Boulder & Lead qualifications took place on 8 April 2023.

Rank	Name	Boulder					Lead	Total	Notes			
Rank	Name	1	2	3	4	Σ	Lead	Total	Notes			
Rank	Name	1	Ai Mori	25.0	24.8	24.6	24.9	99.3	Notes	96.1	195.3	Q
2	Ryu Nakagawa	25.0	24.7	24.8	24.9	99.4	84.1	183.5	Q			
3	Miho Nonaka	25.0	24.9	25.0	25.0	99.9	80.1	180.0	Q			
4	Nonoha Kume	25.0	24.8	25.0	24.9	99.7	80.1	179.8	Q			
5	Michika Nagashima	24.9	9.4	24.9	24.8	84.0	84.1	168.1	Q			
6	Anon Matsfuji	25.0	24.8	25.0	24.9	99.7	60.1	159.8	Q			
7	Hana Koike	24.9	10.0	25.0	5.0	64.9	84.1	149.0	Q			
8	Futaba Ito	25.0	24.8	25.0	25.0	99.8	42.1	141.9	Q			
9	Mia Aoyagi	25.0	24.8	25.0	24.9	99.7	42.1	141.8				
10	Yuno Harigae	25.0	9.9	24.9	24.7	84.5	57.1	141.6				
11	Melody Sekikawa	24.8	24.6	25.0	24.7	99.1	42.0	141.1				
12	Hirano Natsumi	25.0	4.2	24.9	24.7	78.8	57.1	135.9				
13	Natsuki Tanii	25.0	9.3	10.0	4.8	49.1	84.1	133.2				
14	Miku Ishii	25.0	24.7	24.9	4.9	79.5	42.1	121.6				
15	Serika Okawachi	25.0	0.0	25.0	24.9	74.9	42.1	117.0				
16	Mei Kotake	24.8	0.0	4.9	4.8	34.5	80.1	114.6				
17	Tomona Takao	25.0	0.0	5.0	4.9	34.9	76.1	111.0				
18	Souka Hasegawa	10.0	0.0	24.8	4.9	39.3	64.1	103.4				
19	Mashiro Kuzuu	24.9	10.0	4.7	4.9	44.5	57.1	101.6				
20	Ai Takeuchi	25.0	4.1	25.0	4.9	59.0	42.1	101.1				
21	Mao Nakamura	9.8	9.8	25.0	9.9	54.5	42.1	96.6				
22	Nanako Kura	10.0	9.9	24.8	4.8	49.5	42.1	91.6				
23	Mio Nukui	4.9	4.0	25.0	4.6	38.5	48.1	86.6				
24	Sana Ogura	10.0	9.8	9.5	4.3	33.6	42.1	75.7				
25	Sora Ito	9.9	9.4	9.5	4.3	29.2	42.1	71.3				
26	Ichika Osawa	9.7	0.0	25.0	4.7	39.4	30.1	69.5				
27	Kanna Fujimura	10.0	0.0	9.8	0.0	19.8	42.1	61.9				
28	Hatsune Takeishi	0.0	4.6	4.7	9.9	19.0	42.1	61.1				
29	Yuka Higuchi	5.0	0.0	5.0	4.1	19.1	36.1	55.2				
30	Nana Goto	5.0	3.9	4.6	4.9	18.4	36.1	54.5				
31	Honoka Oda	4.5	0.0	4.6	4.6	13.7	36.1	49.8				
32	Yuna Suzuki	10.0	0.0	25.0	4.4	24.4	7.0	41.4				
33	Kiki Matsuda	9.5	0.0	4.7	4.6	18.8	22.1	40.9				
