= Boulder Japan Cup 2022 =

Annual competition climbing event

- Venue: Yokkaichi Dome
- Location: Yokkaichi, Mie Prefecture, Japan
- Date: 5 – 6 February 2022
- Website: https://www.jma-climbing.org/competition/2022/bjc/

Medalists
gold medal	Tomoa Narasaki / Nanako Kura
silver medal	Keita Dohi / Miho Nonaka
bronze medal	Kokoro Fujii / Futaba Ito

The 2022 Boulder Japan Cup (Japanese: ボルダージャパンカップ2022, Hepburn: Borudā Japan Kappu 2022; or BJC 2022) was the 17th edition of the annual competition bouldering event organised by the Japan Mountaineering and Sport Climbing Association (JMSCA), held in Yokkaichi Dome, Mie.

BJC is the sole selection event for Japan's national bouldering team. Athletes who place highly at the BJC are eligible to compete in the Boulder World Cups, subject to JMSCA's prevailing selection criteria. BJC 2022 was the first domestic competition of the 2022 season. 53 men and 43 women competed. Tomoa Narasaki and Nanako Kura claimed the men's and women's titles respectively, with both athletes securing their first BJC titles.

== Finals ==
=== Men ===
The men's bouldering finals took place on 6 February 2022.

Rank	Athlete	Boulder				Total
Rank	Athlete	1	2	3	4	Total
1	Tomoa Narasaki	T2 z2	T5 z4	T2 z2	T2 z1	4T 4z 11 9
2	Keita Dohi	z7	z3	T1 z1	T2 z2	2T 4z 3 13
3	Kokoro Fujii	T3 z3	-	z3	T2 z1	2T 3z 5 7
4	Kento Yamaguchi	-	z8	T3 z1	T4 z2	2T 3z 7 11
5	Yuji Fujiwaki	z2	-	z5	T2 z2	1T 3z 2 9
6	Rei Kawamata	-	z10	-	T2 z2	1T 2z 2 12

=== Women ===
The women's bouldering finals took place on 6 February 2022.

Rank	Athlete	Boulder				Total
Rank	Athlete	1	2	3	4	Total
1	Nanako Kura	T3 z2	T4 z4	T5 z5	T1 z1	4T 4z 13 12
2	Miho Nonaka	T2 z2	z3	T1 z1	T1 z1	3T 4z 4 7
3	Futaba Ito	z1	-	T4 z4	T2 z2	2T 3z 6 7
4	Ai Mori	-	T1 z1	-	T8 z7	2T 2z 9 8
5	Mia Aoyagi	-	T1 z1	-	z2	1T 2z 1 3
6	Saki Kikuchi	z7	z4	-	z6	0T 3z—17

== Semifinals ==
=== Men ===
The men's bouldering semifinals took place on 6 February 2022.

Rank	Athlete	Boulder				Total	Notes
Rank	Athlete	1	2	3	4	Total	Notes
1	Keita Dohi	T1 z1	T1 z1	T4 z4	T2 z1	4T 4z 8 7	Q
2	Rei Kawamata	T5 z3	T6 z2	T3 z3	z2	3T 4z 14 10	Q
3	Kento Yamaguchi	T2 z1	T1 z1	z2	z3	2T 4z 3 7	Q
4	Kokoro Fujii	T1 z1	T2 z1	z3	z3	2T 4z 3 8	Q
5	Yuji Fujiwaki	T1 z1	z2	z6	T3 z2	2T 4z 4 11	Q
6	Tomoa Narasaki	T2 z2	T3 z1	z2	z1	2T 4z 5 6	Q
7	Satone Yoshida	T1 z1	T4 z3	z5	z4	2T 4z 5 13	
8	Taisei Ishimatsu	T2 z2	z1	z4	T4 z2	2T 4z 6 9	
9	Meichi Narasaki	T2 z2	z1	z2	z1	1T 4z 2 6	
10	Toru Kofukuda	T3 z1	z3	z2	z3	1T 4z 3 9	
11	Keita Watabe	T1 z1	z1	-	z1	1T 3z 1 3	
12	Ritsu Kayotani	T1 z1	z2	z4	-	1T 3z 1 7	
13	Yuya Kitae	T4 z2	z1	-	z1	1T 3z 4 4	
14	Junta Sekiguchi	z1	z2	-	z2	0T 3z 0 5	
15	Ryohei Kameyama	z3	z1	-	z1	0T 3z—5	
16	Ryoga Tsukuda	z2	z4	-	z2	0T 3z—8	
17	Yoshiyuki Ogata	z2	z1	-	z6	0T 3z—9	
18	Ryo Omasa	-	z2	z3	z4	0T 3z—9	
19	Yuki Hoshi	z4	z1	-	z7	0T 3z—12	
20	Taisei Homma	-	z2	-	-	0T 1z—2	

=== Women ===
The women's bouldering semifinals took place on 6 February 2022.

Rank	Athlete	Boulder				Total	Notes
Rank	Athlete	1	2	3	4	Total	Notes
1	Miho Nonaka	T1 z1	-	T1 z1	T1 z1	3T 3z 3 3	Q
2	Ai Mori	T2 z1	-	T1 z1	T1 z1	3T 3z 4 3	Q
3	Futaba Ito	T1 z1	-	T1 z1	T2 z2	3T 3z 4 4	Q
4	Mia Aoyagi	T1 z1	-	T2 z2	T1 z1	3T 3z 4 4	Q
5	Nanako Kura	T3 z1	-	T1 z1	T1 z1	3T 3z 5 3	Q
6	Saki Kikuchi	T2 z1	-	T5 z5	T1 z1	3T 3z 8 7	Q
7	Anon Matsufuji	T4 z1	-	T2 z2	T3 z1	3T 3z 9 4	
8	Hana Koike	T1 z1	-	T6 z6	T2 z2	3T 3z 9 9	
9	Serika Okawachi	T1 z1	-	T8 z8	T1 z1	3T 3z 10 10	
10	Nonoha Kume	T2 z1	-	T1 z1	z2	2T 3z 3 4	
11	Mashiro Kuzuu	z2	-	T3 z2	T1 z1	2T 3z 4 5	
12	Mao Nakamura	z1	-	T3 z3	T1 z1	2T 3z 4 5	
13	Yuno Harigae	z5	-	T2 z2	T2 z2	2T 3z 4 9	
14	Kiki Matsuda	z4	-	T5 z2	T3 z3	2T 3z 8 9	
15	Natsuki Tanii	T2 z1	-	T3 z3	-	2T 2z 5 4	
16	Moe Takiguchi	z1	-	T1 z1	z1	1T 3z 1 3	
17	Ryo Nakajima	z3	-	-	T3 z1	1T 2z 3 4	
18	Michika Nagashima	z2	-	T3 z3	-	1T 2z 3 5	
19	Mei Kotake	z1	-	-	z1	0T 2z—2	
--	Miku Ishii					DNS	

== Qualifications ==
=== Men ===
The men's bouldering qualifications took place on 5 February 2022.

Rank	Athlete	Boulder					Total	Notes
Rank	Athlete	1	2	3	4	5	Total	Notes
1	Kokoro Fujii	T1 z1	T1 z1	T2 z2	T3 z1	T1 z1	5T 5z 8 6	Q
2	Taisei Ishimatsu	T1 z1	T1 z1	T3 z3	T2 z2	T1 z1	5T 5z 8 8	Q
2	Meichi Narasaki	T1 z1	T2 z2	T3 z3	T1 z1	T3 z3	5T 5z 8 8	Q
4	Keita Dohi	T1 z1	T1 z1	T1 z1	T3 z3	T4 z1	5T 5z 10 7	Q
5	Tomoa Narasaki	T1 z1	T4 z1	T3 z1	T4 z1	T1 z1	5T 5z 13 5	Q
6	Yuji Fujiwaki	T1 z1	T1 z1	z3	T2 z1	T1 z1	4T 5z 5 7	Q
7	Yoshiyuki Ogata	T1 z1	T2 z2	T1 z1	z1	T4 z2	4T 5z 8 7	Q
8	Yuki Hoshi	T2 z1	T1 z1	T5 z5	z6	T2 z1	4T 5z 9 14	Q
9	Rei Kawamata	z1	T1 z1	T6 z6	T3 z2	T1 z1	4T 5z 11 11	Q
10	Yuya Kitae	T2 z1	T1 z1	T7 z3	z1	T2 z1	4T 5z 12 7	Q
11	Ryo Omasa	T1 z1	T2 z1	T10 z8	z1	T1 z1	4T 5z 14 12	Q
12	Toru Kofukuda	T1 z1	T1 z1	z4	z2	T1 z1	3T 5z 3 9	Q
13	Junta Sekiguchi	T1 z1	T1 z1	T2 z2	z2	z2	3T 5z 4 8	Q
14	Keita Watabe	T1 z1	T1 z1	z7	z1	T2 z2	3T 5z 4 12	Q
15	Kento Yamaguchi	T1 z1	T3 z1	z5	z1	T1 z1	3T 5z 5 9	Q
16	Ritsu Kayotani	T4 z3	T1 z1	z13	z8	T1 z1	3T 5z 6 26	Q
17	Satone Yoshida	z1	T5 z1	T1 z1	z1	T1 z1	3T 5z 7 5	Q
18	Ryoga Tsukada	T2 z2	T2 z1	z3	z1	T3 z1	3T 5z 7 8	Q
19	Ryohei Kameyama	T3 z3	T1 z1	T3 z3	z1	z1	3T 5z 7 9	Q
20	Taisei Homma	T1 z1	T5 z4	T6 z5	z1	z1	3T 5z 12 12	Q
21	Ao Yurikusa	z1	T3 z1	T6 z4	z3	T5 z5	3T 5z 14 14	
22	Masahiro Higuchi	T3 z2	T2 z2	-	z1	T1 z1	3T 4z 6 6	
23	Taiga Sakamoto	T2 z1	T5 z1	-	z1	T2 z1	3T 4z 9 4	
24	Jun Yasukawa	T3 z2	T2 z1	-	T4 z1	z2	3T 4z 9 6	
25	Sohta Amagasa	z1	z1	T1 z1	z1	T3 z3	2T 5z 4 7	
26	Yuta Imaizumi	T3 z1	T1 z1	z8	z1	z1	2T 5z 4 12	
27	Mahiro Takami	z2	z1	z8	T3 z2	T1 z1	2T 5z 4 12	
28	Tomoaki Takata	z2	T3 z2	T2 z1	z1	z2	2T 5z 5 8	
29	Hiroto Shimizu	z2	T4 z1	z3	z1	2T z2	2T 5z 6 9	
30	Katsura Konishi	T1 z1	T5 z5	z5	z1	z3	2T 5z 6 15	
31	Bansho Daiju	z1	T6 z3	z5	T1 z1	z1	2T 5z 7 11	
32	Kotaro Hirasawa	z2	T2 z1	T6 z4	z4	z3	2T 5z 8 14	
33	Sorato Anraku	T2 z1	-	z8	z4	T1 z1	2T 4z 3 14	
34	Akihisa Kaji	z1	T1 z1	-	z2	T4 z2	2T 4z 5 6	
35	Haruyoshi Morimoto	T2 z1	T4 z2	z1	z1	-	2T 4z 6 5	
36	Keiichiro Korenaga	T3 z2	T3 z1	-	z2	z1	2T 4z 6 6	
37	Isamu Kawabata	T7 z6	-	-	z1	T3 z3	2T 3z 10 10	
38	Yusuke Sugimoto	z1	T3 z3	z15	z7	z8	1T 5z 3 34	
39	Masaki Saito	T3 z1	-	z2	z1	z7	1T 4z 3 11	
40	Mizuki Tajima	z2	T4 z1	-	z5	z2	1T 4z 4 10	
41	Aki Shinozawa	z1	T6 z3	-	z2	z8	1T 4z 6 14	
42	Reo Matsuoka	z1	z3	-	-	T1 z1	1T 3z 1 5	
43	Naoki Kawahara	z1	-	-	z6	T1 z1	1T 3z 1 8	
44	Soma Ito	T3 z1	-	-	z3	-	1T 2z 3 4	
45	Kai Kiyomiya	T3 z1	z4	-	-	-	1T 2z 3 5	
46	Ryoga Nakadake	T4 z4	-	-	-	z3	1T 2z 4 7	
47	Hayato Tsuru	z1	z3	z5	z2	-	0T 4z—11	
48	Masayoshi Shimane	z1	-	z6	z2	z4	0T 4z—13	
49	Yuki Ikeda	z2	-	z7	z2	-	0T 3z—11	
50	Taito Nakagami	z2	z1	-	-	-	0T 2z—3	
51	Ryusei Miyamoto	z1	-	-	-	z3	0T 2z—4	
52	Shuhei Yukimaru	z1	z4	-	-	-	0T 2z—5	
53	Taga Tsukasa	-	-	-	z1	-	0T 1z—1	

=== Women ===
The women's bouldering qualifications took place on 5 February 2022.

Rank	Athlete	Boulder					Total	Notes
Rank	Athlete	1	2	3	4	5	Total	Notes
1	Serika Okawachi	T5 z2	T8 z8	T2 z2	z1	T1 z1	4T 5z 16 14	Q
2	Futaba Ito	-	T1 z1	T1 z1	T2 z1	T1 z1	4T 4z 5 4	Q
3	Anon Matsufuji	T2 z2	T1 z1	T1 z1	-	T1 z1	4T 4z 5 5	Q
4	Ai Mori	-	T3 z3	T6 z5	T1 z1	T1 z1	4T 4z 11 10	Q
5	Nonoha Kume	T8 z8	T1 z1	T1 z1	-	T2 z1	4T 4z 12 11	Q
6	Miho Nonaka	T2 z2	T1 z1	z1	z2	T1 z1	3T 5z 4 7	Q
7	Mashiro Kuzuu	z10	T2 z2	z6	T3 z2	T2 z1	3T 5z 7 21	Q
8	Nanako Kura	z4	T2 z2	T4 z1	z1	T6 z2	3T 5z 12 10	Q
9	Mao Nakamura	T7 z7	T1 z1	z2	z2	T4 z1	3T 5z 12 13	Q
10	Mia Aoyagi	T4 z4	T1 z1	z1	-	T1 z1	3T 4z 6 7	Q
11	Saki Kikuchi	T4 z4	T1 z1	z6	-	T2 z1	3T 4z 7 12	Q
12	Kiki Matsuda	T6 z6	T3 z2	z2	-	T3 z1	3T 4z 12 11	Q
13	Moe Takiguchi	-	T1 z1	T1 z1	-	T1 z1	3T 3z 3 3	Q
14	Hana Koike	T4 z4	T1 z1	-	-	T3 z1	3T 3z 8 6	Q
15	Natsuki Tanii	T7 z7	T1 z1	-	-	T3 z1	3T 3z 11 9	Q
16	Mei Kotake	-	T1 z1	z2	z2	T1 z1	2T 4z 2 6	Q
17	Miku Ishii	-	T3 z3	z1	z3	T3 z1	2T 4z 6 8	Q
18	Yuno Harigae	-	T1 z1	T1 z1	-	z3	2T 3z 2 5	Q
19	Ryo Nakajima	T4 z4	T1 z1	-	-	z2	2T 3z 5 7	Q
20	Michika Nagashima	T5 z5	T1 z1	-	-	z1	2T 3z 6 7	Q
21	Sana Ogura	T8 z8	T1 z1	z1	-	-	2T 3z 9 10	
22	Momoka Abe	-	T1 z1	-	-	T2 z1	2T 2z 3 2	
23	Yui Suezawa	T1 z1	T2 z2	-	-	-	2T 2z 3 3	
24	Ryu Nakagawa	z8	T2 z2	z1	-	z2	1T 4z 2 13	
25	Homare Toda	-	T1 z1	z1	-	z1	1T 3z 1 3	
26	Natsumi Hirano	-	T1 z1	-	z2	z4	1T 3z 1 7	
27	Yuki Hiroshige	-	T1 z1	z4	-	z6	1T 3z 1 11	
28	Aya Sugawara	-	T2 z2	z1	-	z1	1T 3z 2 4	
29	Hatsune Takeishi	-	T1 z1	z2	-	-	1T 2z 1 3	
30	Hana Kudo	-	T1 z1	-	-	z6	1T 2z 1 7	
31	Mishika Ishii	-	T2 z2	-	-	z1	1T 2z 2 3	
31	Ai Takeuchi	-	T2 z2	-	-	z1	1T 2z 2 3	
33	Junko Kitawaki	-	T2 z2	-	-	z2	1T 2z 2 4	
34	Hanao Inoue	-	T3 z2	-	-	z6	1T 2z 3 8	
35	Honoka Oda	-	T10 z10	-	-	z9	1T 2z 10 19	
36	Risa Ota	-	-	-	-	T1 z1	1T 1z 1 1	
36	Momoka Kaneko	-	T1 z1	-	-	-	1T 1z 1 1	
38	Rin Ninomiya	-	T2 z2	-	-	-	1T 1z 2 2	
38	Yuka Higuchi	-	T2 z2	-	-	-	1T 1z 2 2	
38	Katsuki Bamba	-	T2 z2	-	-	-	1T 1z 2 2	
41	Momoka Nagashima	-	T4 z4	-	-	-	1T 1z 4 4	
42	Ichika Osawa	-	T7 z7	-	-	-	1T 1z 7 7	
43	Souka Hasegawa	-	-	-	-	z4	0T 1z—4	
