= Boulder Japan Cup 2020 =

Annual competition climbing event

- Venue: Komazawa Olympic Park
- Location: Tokyo, Japan
- Date: 8 – 9 February 2020
- Website: https://www.jma-climbing.org/competition/2020/bjc/

Medalists
gold medal	Kai Harada / Futaba Ito
silver medal	Tomoa Narasaki / Akiyo Noguchi
bronze medal	Yuji Fujiwaki / Miho Nonaka

The 2020 Boulder Japan Cup (Japanese: ボルダージャパンカップ2020, Hepburn: Borudā Japan Kappu 2020; or BJC 2020) was the 15th edition of the annual competition bouldering event organised by the Japan Mountaineering and Sport Climbing Association (JMSCA), held in Komazawa Olympic Park, Tokyo.

BJC is the sole selection event for Japan's national bouldering team. Athletes who place highly at the BJC are eligible to compete in the Boulder World Cups, subject to JMSCA's prevailing selection criteria. BJC 2020 was the first domestic competition of the 2020 season. 60 men and 47 women competed. Kai Harada and Futaba Ito claimed the men's and women's titles respectively, with Kai Harada securing his first BJC title.

== Finals ==
=== Men ===
The men's bouldering finals took place on 9 February 2020.

Rank	Athlete	Boulder				Total
Rank	Athlete	1	2	3	4	Total
1	Kai Harada	z2	T1 z1	z2	T4 z1	2T 4z 5 6
2	Tomoa Narasaki	T1 z1	-	z1	T3 z1	2T 3z 4 3
3	Yuji Fujiwaki	T6 z6	-	z2	z1	1T 3z 6 9
4	Rei Kawamata	T2 z2	z3	-	-	1T 2z 2 5
5	Katsura Konishi	T7 z7	-	-	-	1T 1z 7 7
6	Daiki Sano	z6	-	-	-	0T 1z—6

=== Women ===
The women's bouldering finals took place on 9 February 2020.

Rank	Athlete	Boulder				Total
Rank	Athlete	1	2	3	4	Total
1	Futaba Ito	T1 z1	z3	T2 z2	T3 z3	3T 4z 6 9
2	Akiyo Noguchi	T1 z1	T1 z1	-	T2 z2	3T 3z 4 4
3	Miho Nonaka	z1	T2 z1	-	T1 z1	2T 3z 3 3
4	Ai Mori	T1 z1	T2 z2	-	-	2T 2z 3 3
5	Natsuki Tanii	z1	z2	-	-	0T 2z—3
6	Anon Matsufuji	z5	z1	-	-	0T 2z—6

== Semifinals ==
=== Men ===
The men's bouldering semifinals took place on 9 February 2020.

Rank	Athlete	Boulder				Total	Notes
Rank	Athlete	1	2	3	4	Total	Notes
1	Rei Kawamata	T4 z4	-	T4 z4	T2 z2	3T 3z 10 10	Q
2	Yuji Fujiwaki	T3 z1	-	T4 z4	T4 z3	3T 3z 11 8	Q
3	Kai Harada	T2 z2	-	T5 z4	z3	2T 3z 7 9	Q
4	Tomoa Narasaki	-	T6 z6	T2 z2	z2	2T 3z 8 10	Q
5	Katsura Konishi	T2 z2	-	T8 z8	z1	2T 3z 10 11	Q
6	Daiki Sano	-	T8 z8	T3 z2	z2	2T 3z 11 12	Q
7	Taisei Ishimatsu	-	-	T1 z1	T3 z1	2T 2z 4 2	
8	Rei Sugimoto	-	-	T2 z2	T7 z7	2T 2z 9 9	
9	Keita Dohi	z2	z10	T1 z1	z2	1T 4z 1 15	
10	Keita Watabe	z2	-	T2 z2	z1	1T 3z 2 5	
11	Kokoro Fujii	z1	-	T4 z4	z1	1T 3z 4 6	
12	Meichi Narasaki	-	z4	T2 z1	-	1T 2z 2 5	
13	Yuya Kitae	-	-	T4 z3	z3	1T 2z 4 7	
14	Yuta Imaizumi	-	-	T6 z6	z1	1T 2z 6 7	
15	Yuki Hada	z1	z3	z3	z4	0T 4z—11	
16	Hibiki Yamauchi	-	-	z2	z3	0T 2z—5	
17	Tomoaki Takata	z2	-	-	-	0T 1z—2	
18	Yuki Hoshi	-	-	z8	-	0T 1z—8	
19	Makoto Yamauchi	-	-	z9	-	0T 1z—9	
20	Kento Yamaguchi	-	-	-	-	0T 0z——	

=== Women ===
The women's bouldering semifinals took place on 9 February 2020.

Rank	Athlete	Boulder				Total	Notes
Rank	Athlete	1	2	3	4	Total	Notes
1	Miho Nonaka	T1 z1	T1 z7	T3 z1	T1 z1	4T 4z 12 10	Q
2	Futaba Ito	T2 z2	T1 z1	T3 z1	T1 z1	4T 4z 7 5	Q
3	Miho Nonaka	T2 z1	T1 z1	z1	T1 z1	3T 4z 4 5	Q
4	Anon Matsufuji	T7 z5	T2 z2	z1	T2 z2	3T 4z 11 10	Q
5	Ai Mori	-	T3 z3	T1 z1	T1 z1	3T 3z 5 5	Q
6	Natsuki Tanii	-	T5 z5	T4 z1	T4 z1	3T 3z 13 7	Q
7	Serika Okawachi	z5	T4 z2	z4	T7 z7	2T 4z 11 18	
8	Hana Koike	-	T4 z4	z5	T1 z1	3T 3z 5 10	
9	Hirano Natsumi	-	T3 z2	T4 z2	z1	2T 3z 7 5	
10	Mao Nakamura	z3	z5	z9	T1 z1	1T 4z 1 18	
11	Nanami Nobe	T6 z6	z3	z1	z3	1T 4z 6 13	
12	Mia Aoyagi	T7 z4	z2	z11	z7	1T 4z 7 24	
13	Hana Kudo	T8 z8	z2	z2	z1	1T 4z 8 13	
14	Ryu Nakagawa	T9 z9	-	z3	z1	1T 3z 9 13	
15	Nanako Kura	z3	z2	z1	z1	0T 4z—7	
16	Saki Kikuchi	z7	z4	z1	z1	0T 4z—13	
17	Risa Ota	-	z7	z1	z3	0T 3z—11	
18	Aya Sugawara	z8	z6	z2	-	0T 3z—16	
19	Kokoro Takada	-	z1	z2	-	0T 2z—3	
20	Mei Kotake	-	-	z4	z1	0T 2z—5	
21	Mio Nukui	-	z4	z8	-	0T 2z—12	

== Qualifications ==
=== Men ===
The men's bouldering qualifications took place on 8 February 2020.

Rank	Athlete	Boulder					Total	Notes
Rank	Athlete	1	2	3	4	5	Total	Notes
1	Kai Harada	T1 z1	T1 z1	T1 z1	T2 z2	T1 z1	5T 5z 6 6	Q
2	Keita Dohi	T4 z3	T2 z2	T2 z2	T1 z1	T1 z1	5T 5z 10 9	Q
3	Tomoa Narasaki	T1 z1	T4 z4	T5 z4	T1 z1	T3 z1	5T 5z 14 11	Q
4	Taisei Ishimatsu	T1 z1	T3 z2	T1 z1	z1	T3 z1	4T 5z 8 6	Q
5	Keita Watabe	T2 z1	T2 z2	T4 z3	T1 z1	z1	4T 5z 9 8	Q
6	Katsura Konishi	T1 z1	T1 z1	T4 z4	z1	T3 z3	4T 5z 9 10	Q
7	Kokoro Fujii	T1 z1	z7	T5 z5	T2 z2	T1 z1	4T 5z 9 16	Q
8	Makoto Yamauchi	T2 z1	T2 z2	-	T3 z3	T2 z2	4T 4z 9 8	Q
9	Hibiki Yamauchi	T2 z2	T1 z1	T3 z3	T4 z4	-	4T 4z 10 10	Q
10	Rei Kawamata	T2 z2	T5 z2	T3 z1	T3 z3	-	4T 4z 13 8	Q
11	Daiki Sano	T3 z3	T4 z3	T8 z8	T6 z6	-	4T 4z 21 20	Q
12	Yuji Fujiwaki	T1 z1	T3 z3	T1 z1	z7	z2	3T 5z 5 14	Q
13	Tomoaki Takata	T4 z4	T3 z3	T3 z3	z1	z2	3T 5z 10 13	Q
14	Rei Sugimoto	T2 z2	z6	T2 z2	T7 z7	z3	3T 5z 11 20	Q
15	Yuya Kitae	T1 z1	T3 z1	T4 z3	-	z2	3T 4z 8 7	Q
16	Meichi Narasaki	T4 z2	T1 z1	z4	T6 z6	-	3T 4z 11 13	Q
17	Yuta Imaizumi	T4 z4	z4	T3 z3	T5 z1	-	3T 4z 12 12	Q
18	Yuki Hoshi	T1 z1	T6 z4	T3 z3	-	-	3T 3z 10 8	Q
19	Kento Yamaguchi	T2 z2	T3 z3	-	T5 z5	-	3T 3z 10 10	Q
20	Yuki Hada	T1 z1	T4 z4	T7 z6	-	-	3T 3z 12 11	Q
21	Hiroto Shimizu	T1 z1	T7 z7	T6 z6	-	-	3T 3z 14 14	
22	Haruki Nishiura	T7 z7	T5 z3	T5 z5	-	-	3T 3z 17 15	
23	Ryo Omasa	T1 z1	z3	z7	-	T5 z5	2T 4z 6 16	
24	Yoshiyuki Ogata	T5 z5	T2 z2	z1	-	z1	2T 4z 7 9	
25	Ryuichi Murai	T4 z4	z2	T5 z5	-	z2	2T 4z 9 13	
26	Sohta Amagasa	T2 z2	z1	T2 z2	-	-	2T 3z 4 5	
27	Haruyoshi Morimoto	T1 z1	T3 z2	z9	-	z1	2T 3z 4 12	
28	Taisei Homma	T2 z2	T3 z3	-	-	z1	2T 3z 5 6	
29	Tatsuma Yamaguchi	T1 z1	T4 z3	-	z5	-	2T 3z 5 9	
30	Ao Yurikusa	T1 z1	z4	T10 z10	-	-	2T 3z 11 15	
31	Ryoei Nukui	T3 z3	T9 z4	z7	-	-	2T 3z 12 14	
32	Masaki Saito	T6 z5	z2	T9 z8	-	-	2T 3z 15 15	
33	Hayato Tsuru	T16 z16	z10	T6 z6	-	-	2T 3z 22 32	
34	Toru Kofukuda	T3 z3	T4 z3	-	-	-	2T 2z 7 6	
35	Ritsu Kayotani	T5 z5	T3 z3	-	-	-	2T 2z 8 8	
36	Ryohei Kameyama	T1 z1	z2	-	z1	z1	1T 4z 1 5	
37	Reo Yoshii	T1 z1	z5	z1	-	-	1T 3z 1 7	
38	Mizuki Tajima	T1 z1	z8	z8	-	-	1T 3z 1 17	
39	Hajime Takeda	T3 z3	z1	z5	-	-	1T 3z 3 9	
40	Masayoshi Shimane	-	T3 z3	z5	z5	-	1T 3z 3 13	
41	Hiroki Kobayashi	T4 z3	z4	z8	-	-	1T 3z 4 15	
42	Yuki Ikeda	T4 z3	z5	-	-	z10	1T 3z 4 18	
43	Taito Nakagami	T1 z1	z6	-	-	-	1T 2z 1 7	
44	Kantaro Ito	T2 z2	z3	-	-	-	1T 2z 2 5	
45	Naoki Kawahara	-	T2 z2	-	z5	-	1T 2z 2 7	
46	Masahiro Higuchi	T2 z2	-	-	-	z6	1T 2z 2 8	
47	Yuta Watanabe	z10	T2 z2	-	-	-	1T 2z 2 12	
48	Soya Shimada	T3 z3	z3	-	-	-	1T 2z 3 6	
49	Jun Yasukawa	T4 z2	z5	-	-	-	1T 2z 4 7	
50	Yuki Ito	z5	T8 z3	-	-	-	1T 2z 8 8	
51	Isamu Kawabata	-	T1 z1	-	-	-	1T 1z 1 1	
52	Keita Mineoi	T5 z3	-	-	-	-	1T 1z 5 3	
53	Kaya Otaka	z9	z1	z6	-	-	0T 3z—16	
54	Hiroki Kawakami	-	z1	-	-	z5	0T 2z—6	
55	Akihisa Kaji	-	z5	z7	-	-	0T 2z—12	
56	Hisui Shirasaka	-	z3	z12	-	-	0T 2z—15	
57	Toshiyuki Yoshinaga	-	z6	-	-	-	0T 1z—6	
58	Daichi Nakajima	-	z7	-	-	-	0T 1z—7	
59	Junta Sekiguchi	-	z8	-	-	-	0T 1z—8	
60	Kotaro Hirazawa	-	z9	-	-	-	0T 1z—9	

=== Women ===
The women's bouldering qualifications took place on 8 February 2020.

Rank	Athlete	Boulder					Total	Notes
Rank	Athlete	1	2	3	4	5	Total	Notes
1	Anon Matsufuji	T1 z1	T1 z1	T1 z1	z2	T1 z1	4T 5z 4 6	Q
2	Ai Mori	T1 z1	T1 z1	T1 z1	z7	T1 z1	4T 5z 4 11	Q
3	Futaba Ito	T1 z1	T1 z1	T1 z1	z9	T1 z1	4T 5z 4 13	Q
4	Nanami Nobe	T1 z1	T1 z1	T1 z1	z4	T2 z2	4T 4z 5 9	Q
4	Akiyo Noguchi	T1 z1	T1 z1	T2 z1	z5	T1 z1	4T 5z 5 9	Q
6	Mei Kotake	T1 z1	T1 z1	T1 z1	z11	T2 z1	4T 5z 5 15	Q
7	Saki Kikuchi	T1 z1	T3 z1	T1 z1	z4	T1 z1	4T 5z 6 8	Q
8	Natsuki Tanii	T3 z3	T1 z1	T1 z1	z16	T1 z1	4T 5z 6 22	Q
9	Natsumi Hirano	T2 z1	T1 z1	T2 z1	z3	T2 z1	4T 5z 7 8	Q
10	Nanako Kura	T4 z1	T3 z1	T1 z1	z6	T2 z2	4T 5z 10 11	Q
11	Ryu Nakagawa	T1 z1	T1 z1	T1 z1	-	T1 z1	4T 4z 4 4	Q
12	Serika Okawachi	T1 z1	T1 z1	T2 z2	-	T1 z1	4T 4z 5 5	Q
12	Miho Nonaka	T1 z1	T1 z1	T2 z2	-	T1 z1	4T 4z 5 5	Q
14	Risa Ota	T3 z1	T1 z1	T2 z2	-	T1 z1	4T 4z 9 7	Q
15	Mio Nukui	T2 z1	T3 z1	T1 z1	-	T9 z8	4T 4z 15 11	Q
16	Hana Kudo	T2 z1	T1 z1	T2 z2	-	T10 z10	4T 4z 15 14	Q
17	Mao Nakamura	z1	T1 z1	T1 z1	z8	T2 z1	3T 5z 4 12	Q
18	Hana Koike	z1	T3 z1	T1 z1	z6	T4 z1	3T 5z 8 10	Q
19	Aya Sugawara	T1 z1	T3 z1	z4	-	T1 z1	3T 4z 5 7	Q
20	Kokoro Takada	z2	T1 z1	T3 z3	-	T3 z2	3T 4z 7 8	Q
20	Mia Aoyagi	T1 z1	z1	T1 z1	-	T5 z5	3T 4z 7 8	Q
22	Mashiro Kuzuu	z3	T1 z1	T1 z1	-	T5 z4	3T 4z 7 9	
23	Saari Watanabe	T2 z2	T4 z1	z4	-	T2 z2	3T 4z 8 9	
24	Miku Ishii	z3	T3 z3	T2 z2	-	T4 z4	3T 4z 9 12	
25	Honoka Moriwaki	z1	T3 z2	T6 z3	-	T4 z3	3T 4z 13 9	
26	Yuno Harigae	z1	T2 z1	T1 z1	z5	z5	2T 5z 3 13	
27	Kiki Matsuda	z2	z1	T2 z2	z5	T2 z1	2T 5z 4 11	
28	Hana Kogure	z1	z1	T5 z5	z4	T4 z3	2T 5z 9 14	
29	Momoka Kaneko	T1 z1	z1	T1 z1	-	z7	2T 4z 2 10	
30	Moeka Niitaka	z1	T1 z1	T2 z2	-	z1	2T 4z 3 5	
31	Homare Toda	z1	T1 z1	z2	-	T3 z3	2T 4z 4 7	
32	Miu Kurita	z1	T3 z1	T1 z1	-	z5	2T 4z 4 8	
32	Miu Kakizaki	z1	T1 z1	T3 z3	-	z3	2T 4z 4 8	
34	Momoka Mitashima	z3	T1 z1	T3 z2	-	z4	2T 4z 4 10	
35	Shioi Tani	T1 z1	z1	T3 z3	-	z11	2T 4z 4 16	
36	Asuka Tubono	z2	T4 z1	T4 z4	-	z4	2T 4z 8 11	
37	Kaoru Iwasaki	z1	T4 z1	T5 z4	-	z4	2T 4z 9 10	
38	Momoko Abe	z2	T2 z1	T4 z2	-	-	2T 3z 6 5	
39	Ryo Nakajima	-	T5 z1	T3 z3	-	z1	2T 3z 8 5	
40	Moe Takiguchi	z4	T1 z1	-	-	z2	1T 3z 1 7	
41	Yuka Higuchi	z2	T2 z1	z1	-	z4	1T 3z 2 4	
42	Akane Kinoshita	-	T1 z1	-	-	z4	1T 2z 1 5	
43	Yurina Honda	-	z1	T2 z2	-	-	1T 2z 2 3	
44	Maya Fukino	z1	z1	-	-	z1	0T 3z—3	
45	Kouran Fuchi	z1	z2	-	-	z2	0T 3z—5	
46	Suzu Miyashita	-	z2	z6	-	-	0T 2z—8	
47	Hina Morimoto	z5	z4	-	-	-	0T 2z—9	
