= Boulder Japan Cup 2024 =

Annual competition climbing event

- Venue: Kyushu Climbing Base SAGA
- Location: Taku, Saga, Japan
- Date: 10 – 12 February 2024
- Website: https://www.jma-climbing.org/competition/2024/bjc/

Medalists
| gold medal | Yoshiyuki Ogata / Mao Nakamura |
| silver medal | Tomoa Narasaki / Miho Nonaka |
| bronze medal | Yuji Fujiwaki / Anon Matsufuji |

The 2024 Boulder Japan Cup (BJC) was the 19th edition of the annual competition bouldering event organised by the Japan Mountaineering and Sport Climbing Association (JMSCA), held in Kyushu Climbing Base, Saga.

BJC is the sole selection event for Japan's national bouldering team. Athletes who place highly at the BJC are eligible to compete in the Boulder World Cups, subject to JMSCA's prevailing selection criteria. BJC 2024 was the first domestic competition of the 2024 season. 60 men and 54 women competed, with Yoshiyuki Ogata and Mao Nakamura winning the men's and women's titles respectively.

== Finals ==
=== Men ===
The men's bouldering finals took place on 12 February 2024.

| Rank | Athlete | Boulder | | | | Total |
| Rank | Athlete | 1 | 2 | 3 | 4 | Total |
|---|---|---|---|---|---|---|
| 1 | Yoshiyuki Ogata | T2 z1 | z1 | T6 z2 | - | 2T 3z 8 4 |
| 2 | Tomoa Narasaki | z1 | z1 | T1 z1 | z1 | 1T 4z 1 4 |
| 3 | Yuji Fujiwaki | T2 z1 | z4 | - | z1 | 1T 3z 2 6 |
| 4 | Meichi Narasaki | z5 | - | T2 z2 | z1 | 1T 3z 2 8 |
| 5 | Ritsu Kayotani | T1 z1 | - | - | z2 | 1T 2z 1 3 |
| 6 | Sorato Anraku | T1 z1 | - | - | z3 | 1T 2z 1 4 |

=== Women ===
The women's bouldering finals took place on 12 February 2024.

| Rank | Athlete | Boulder | | | | Total |
| Rank | Athlete | 1 | 2 | 3 | 4 | Total |
|---|---|---|---|---|---|---|
| 1 | Mao Nakamura | T1 z1 | z1 | T1 z1 | T2 z2 | 3T 4z 4 5 |
| 2 | Miho Nonaka | T1 z1 | T2 z2 | z5 | T2 z2 | 3T 4z 5 10 |
| 3 | Anon Matsufuji | - | T2 z1 | T1 z1 | T7 z7 | 3T 3z 10 9 |
| 4 | Futaba Ito | T1 z1 | T2 z1 | z2 | z6 | 2T 4z 3 10 |
| 5 | Ai Mori | T1 z1 | T2 z1 | - | z6 | 2T 3z 3 8 |
| 6 | Miku Ishii | T4 z4 | z1 | - | - | 1T 2z 4 5 |

== Semifinals ==
=== Men ===
The men's bouldering semifinals took place on 11 February 2024.

| Rank | Athlete | Boulder | | | | Total | Notes |
| Rank | Athlete | 1 | 2 | 3 | 4 | Total | Notes |
|---|---|---|---|---|---|---|---|
| 1 | Tomoa Narasaki | T7 z7 | z4 | T2 z2 | T8 z2 | 3T 4z 17 15 | Q |
| 2 | Ritsu Kayotani | z3 | z4 | T7 z6 | T3 z3 | 2T 4z 10 16 | Q |
| 3 | Meichi Narasaki | T6 z2 | - | T1 z1 | z1 | 2T 3z 7 4 | Q |
| 4 | Yoshiyuki Ogata | T4 z2 | z1 | z7 | z7 | 1T 4z 4 17 | Q |
| 5 | Sorato Anraku | z1 | z8 | T12 z11 | z12 | 1T 4z 12 32 | Q |
| 6 | Yuji Fujiwaki | z6 | z8 | T6 z6 | - | 1T 3z 6 20 | Q |
| 7 | Sohta Amagasa | z4 | - | T4 z4 | - | 1T 2z 4 8 | |
| 8 | Satone Yoshida | z2 | - | T6 z5 | - | 1T 2z 6 7 | |
| 9 | Kodai Yamada | - | - | - | T4 z3 | 1T 1z 4 3 | |
| 10 | Ritsu Kayotani | z2 | z5 | z7 | - | 0T 3z 0 14 | |
| 11 | Yuta Imaizumi | - | z2 | z5 | - | 0T 2z 0 7 | |
| 12 | Mahiro Takami | z7 | z1 | - | - | 0T 2z 0 8 | |
| 13 | Ao Yurikusa | z2 | - | z8 | - | 0T 2z 0 10 | |
| 14 | Rei Kawamata | - | z2 | - | - | 0T 1z 0 2 | |
| 15 | Tomoaki Takata | z3 | - | - | - | 0T 1z 0 3 | |
| 16 | Kento Yamaguchi | - | z4 | - | - | 0T 1z 0 4 | |
| 17 | Haruyoshi Morimoto | z4 | - | - | - | 0T 1z 0 4 | |
| 18 | Rei Sugimoto | - | z5 | - | - | 0T 1z 0 5 | |
| 19 | Eito Tamiya | z5 | - | - | - | 0T 1z 0 5 | |
| 20 | Hareru Nagamori | - | - | - | - | 0T 0z 0 0 | |

=== Women ===
The women's bouldering semifinals took place on 12 February 2024.

| Rank | Athlete | Boulder | | | | Total | Notes |
| Rank | Athlete | 1 | 2 | 3 | 4 | Total | Notes |
|---|---|---|---|---|---|---|---|
| 1 | Mao Nakamura | T1 z1 | T6 z6 | T2 z1 | z1 | 3T 4z 9 9 | Q |
| 2 | Anon Matsufuji | T4 z2 | T2 z2 | T5 z1 | - | 3T 3z 11 5 | Q |
| 3 | Futaba Ito | T5 z4 | T3 z2 | z2 | z2 | 2T 4z 8 10 | Q |
| 4 | Miku Ishii | z1 | T9 z5 | z1 | T1 z1 | 2T 4z 10 8 | Q |
| 5 | Miho Nonaka | T1 z1 | z8 | z4 | z2 | 1T 4z 1 15 | Q |
| 6 | Ai Mori | z5 | z3 | T2 z1 | z7 | 1T 4z 2 16 | Q |
| 7 | Melody Sekikawa | z2 | T2 z2 | - | z2 | 1T 3z 2 6 | |
| 8 | Natsumi Hirano | - | z4 | T3 z3 | z1 | 1T 3z 3 8 | |
| 9 | Ai Takeuchi | - | T8 z8 | z2 | z1 | 1T 3z 8 11 | |
| 10 | Kaho Murakoshi | z4 | z1 | z5 | z1 | 0T 4z 0 11 | |
| 11 | Nanami Nobe | z9 | z5 | z2 | z2 | 0T 4z 0 18 | |
| 12 | Nanako Kura | z3 | z3 | - | z4 | 0T 3z 0 10 | |
| 13 | Sana Ogura | z5 | z1 | - | z6 | 0T 3z 0 12 | |
| 14 | Mashiro Kuzuu | z8 | z4 | - | z2 | 0T 3z 0 14 | |
| 15 | Mia Aoyagi | z4 | - | z8 | z6 | 0T 3z 0 18 | |
| 16 | Manami Yama | z15 | z7 | z7 | - | 0T 3z 0 29 | |
| 17 | Ryo Nakajima | - | z3 | z1 | - | 0T 2z 0 4 | |
| 18 | Yui Suezawa | z2 | - | z2 | - | 0T 2z 0 4 | |
| 19 | Sora Ito | - | z4 | z5 | - | 0T 2z 0 9 | |
| 20 | Serika Okawachi | z8 | - | z2 | - | 0T 2z 0 10 | |

== Qualifications ==
=== Men ===
The men's bouldering qualifications took place on 10 February 2024.

| Rank | Athlete | Boulder | | | | | Total | Notes |
| Rank | Athlete | 1 | 2 | 3 | 4 | 5 | Total | Notes |
|---|---|---|---|---|---|---|---|---|
| 1 | Meichi Narasaki | T1 z1 | T2 z2 | T2 z1 | T1 z1 | T2 z1 | 5T 5z 8 6 | Q |
| 2 | Kento Yamaguchi | T2 z2 | T2 z2 | T1 z1 | T1 z1 | T2 z1 | 5T 5z 8 7 | Q |
| 3 | Tomoa Narasaki | T2 z2 | T2 z2 | T1 z1 | T1 z1 | T4 z3 | 5T 5z 10 9 | Q |
| 4 | Rei Sugimoto | T1 z1 | T7 z7 | T2 z1 | T1 z1 | T2 z2 | 5T 5z 13 12 | Q |
| 5 | Mahiro Takami | T1 z1 | T3 z3 | T5 z5 | T5 z5 | T1 z1 | 5T 5z 15 15 | Q |
| 6 | Ritsu Kayotani | T1 z1 | T3 z3 | T4 z4 | T6 z6 | T3 z2 | 5T 5z 17 16 | Q |
| 7 | Taiga Sakamoto | T2 z1 | T3 z3 | T4 z4 | T1 z1 | z1 | 4T 5z 10 10 | Q |
| 8 | Ao Yurikusa | T2 z2 | T9 z9 | z5 | T6 z6 | T3 z2 | 4T 5z 20 24 | Q |
| 9 | Yoshiyuki Ogata | T1 z1 | - | T2 z2 | T1 z1 | T2 z1 | 4T 4z 6 5 | Q |
| 10 | Rei Kawamata | T1 z1 | T3 z1 | T2 z2 | - | T2 z1 | 4T 4z 8 5 | Q |
| 11 | Sorato Anraku | T2 z2 | T6 z2 | - | T1 z1 | T3 z1 | 4T 4z 12 6 | Q |
| 12 | Yuji Fujiwaki | T1 z1 | - | T4 z4 | T4 z4 | T3 z1 | 4T 4z 12 10 | Q |
| 13 | Sohta Amagasa | T1 z1 | T1 z1 | z2 | T2 z2 | z1 | 3T 5z 4 7 | Q |
| 14 | Haruyoshi Morimoto | T2 z1 | T1 z1 | z3 | T6 z6 | z2 | 3T 5z 9 13 | Q |
| 15 | Tomoaki Takata | T1 z1 | z5 | T2 z2 | T7 z7 | z1 | 3T 5z 10 16 | Q |
| 16 | Yuta Imaizumi | T1 z1 | T2 z1 | T4 z1 | - | z1 | 3T 4z 7 4 | Q |
| 17 | Satone Yoshida | T2 z1 | T4 z3 | T3 z1 | - | z3 | 3T 4z 9 8 | Q |
| 18 | Kodai Yamada | T1 z1 | - | z4 | T5 z5 | T3 z1 | 3T 4z 9 11 | Q |
| 19 | Hareru Nagamori | T1 z1 | z4 | T3 z3 | T6 z6 | - | 3T 4z 10 14 | Q |
| 20 | Eito Tamiya | T1 z1 | T2 z2 | - | T8 z8 | z1 | 3T 4z 11 12 | Q |
| 21 | Mizuki Tajima | T1 z1 | T3 z3 | - | T1 z1 | - | 3T 3z 5 5 | |
| 22 | Junta Sekiguchi | T3 z2 | T4 z3 | - | - | T3 z2 | 3T 3z 10 7 | |
| 23 | Taito Nakagami | z2 | z5 | T4 z4 | T1 z1 | z4 | 2T 5z 5 16 | |
| 24 | Reo Matsuoka | z1 | z3 | T1 z1 | T2 z2 | 2T 4z 3 7 | | |
| 25 | Hayato Tsuru | T1 z1 | z7 | z4 | T2 z2 | - | 2T 4z 3 14 | |
| 26 | Kokoro Fujii | T1 z1 | z3 | z4 | - | T3 z1 | 2T 4z 4 9 | |
| 27 | Ryo Omasa | T1 z1 | z7 | z4 | - | T4 z3 | 2T 4z 5 15 | |
| 28 | Ryoei Nukui | T3 z2 | T4 z2 | z2 | - | z1 | 2T 4z 7 7 | |
| 29 | Yusuke Sugimoto | T1 z1 | - | z2 | T6 z6 | z2 | 2T 4z 7 11 | |
| 30 | Haruto Imai | z7 | T6 z4 | - | T2 z2 | z2 | 2T 4z 8 15 | |
| 31 | Yosui Sashara | T5 z2 | z3 | z9 | T7 z7 | - | 2T 4z 12 21 | |
| 32 | Kei Hommyo | T1 z1 | T2 z2 | z1 | - | - | 2T 3z 3 4 | |
| 33 | Aki Shinozawa | T2 z2 | - | T4 z1 | - | z2 | 2T 3z 6 5 | |
| 34 | Toru Kofukuda | z3 | T4 z3 | - | - | T2 z1 | 2T 3z 6 7 | |
| 35 | Rei Sasaki | T2 z1 | z3 | T4 z4 | - | - | 2T 3z 6 8 | |
| 36 | Yuki Hoshi | T2 z2 | T4 z4 | z3 | - | - | 2T 3z 6 9 | |
| 37 | Shion Omata | T7 z3 | - | z6 | - | T2 z1 | 2T 3z 9 10 | |
| 38 | Katsura Konishi | T3 z2 | T6 z4 | z6 | - | - | 2T 3z 9 12 | |
| 39 | Hiroto Shimizu | T2 z2 | - | T2 z1 | - | - | 2T 2z 4 3 | |
| 40 | Keisetsu Onishi | T1 z1 | z4 | - | - | z4 | 1T 3z 1 9 | |
| 41 | Keita Dohi | T2 z2 | z3 | - | - | z1 | 1T 3z 2 6 | |
| 42 | Isamu Kawabata | T2 z2 | z5 | - | - | z2 | 1T 3z 2 9 | |
| 43 | Manato Kurashiki | T3 z1 | z3 | - | - | z1 | 1T 3z 3 5 | |
| 44 | Yuta Kayotani | T5 z4 | z9 | - | - | z3 | 1T 3z 5 16 | |
| 45 | Mirei Sasaki | T7 z7 | z5 | z3 | - | - | 1T 3z 7 15 | |
| 46 | Masahiro Higuchi | T1 z1 | - | - | - | z3 | 1T 2z 1 4 | |
| 47 | Kisato Wada | T1 z1 | - | - | - | z4 | 1T 2z 1 5 | |
| 48 | Hinata Terakawa | T2 z1 | z5 | - | - | - | 1T 2z 2 6 | |
| 49 | Ema Kurita | T3 z1 | z9 | - | - | - | 1T 2z 3 10 | |
| 50 | Takumi Takayanagi | z1 | - | - | T4 z4 | - | 1T 2z 4 5 | |
| 51 | Hidemasa Nishida | T5 z2 | z2 | - | - | - | 1T 2z 5 4 | |
| 52 | Masaya Ogata | z1 | z2 | - | - | z6 | 0T 3z 0 9 | |
| 53 | Soma Ito | z1 | z1 | - | - | z8 | 0T 3z 0 10 | |
| 54 | Shuhei Yukimura | z4 | z7 | - | - | z3 | 0T 3z 0 14 | |
| 55 | Haruto Tanno | z1 | - | z2 | - | - | 0T 2z 0 3 | |
| 56 | Junnosuke Hashiyama | z1 | z5 | - | - | - | 0T 2z 0 6 | |
| 56 | Shota Furukawa | - | z3 | - | - | z3 | 0T 2z 0 6 | |
| 58 | Atsushi Komiyama | z8 | - | - | - | z1 | 0T 2z 0 9 | |
| 59 | Fuya Goto | z7 | - | - | - | z6 | 0T 2z 0 13 | |
| 60 | Simone Lombardo | z1 | - | - | - | - | 0T 1z 0 1 | |

=== Women ===
The women's bouldering qualifications took place on 11 February 2024.

| Rank | Athlete | Boulder | | | | | Total | Notes |
| Rank | Athlete | 1 | 2 | 3 | 4 | 5 | Total | Notes |
|---|---|---|---|---|---|---|---|---|
| 1 | Mao Nakamura | T1 z1 | T1 z1 | T3 z1 | T1 z1 | T1 z1 | 5T 5z 7 5 | Q |
| 2 | Miho Nonaka | T1 z1 | T4 z1 | T2 z2 | T1 z1 | T1 z1 | 5T 5z 9 6 | Q |
| 3 | Anon Matsufuji | T1 z1 | T1 z1 | T1 z1 | T1 z1 | T6 z6 | 5T 5z 10 10 | Q |
| 4 | Melody Sekikawa | T1 z1 | z7 | T1 z1 | T2 z1 | T1 z1 | 4T 5z 5 11 | Q |
| 5 | Ai Takeuchi | T1 z1 | z4 | T2 z1 | T1 z1 | T4 z4 | 4T 5z 8 11 | Q |
| 6 | Natsumi Hirano | T1 z1 | T4 z3 | z2 | T2 z1 | T3 z2 | 4T 5z 10 9 | Q |
| 7 | Sana Ogura | T1 z1 | T2 z2 | z1 | T2 z1 | T5 z5 | 4T 5z 10 10 | Q |
| 8 | Kaho Murakoshi | T1 z1 | z1 | z7 | T1 z1 | T1 z1 | 3T 5z 3 11 | Q |
| 8 | Ryo Nakajima | T1 z1 | T1 z1 | z6 | T1 z1 | z2 | 3T 5z 3 11 | Q |
| 10 | Mia Aoyagi | T1 z1 | z1 | z8 | T2 z2 | T2 z2 | 3T 5z 5 14 | Q |
| 11 | Manami Yama | T1 z1 | z1 | z2 | T4 z1 | T3 z2 | 3T 5z 8 7 | Q |
| 12 | Serika Okawachi | T1 z1 | z2 | z4 | T3 z1 | T5 z2 | 3T 5z 9 10 | Q |
| 13 | Futaba Ito | T1 z1 | - | z3 | T1 z1 | T2 z2 | 3T 4z 4 7 | Q |
| 14 | Mashiro Kuzuu | T1 z1 | - | z3 | T2 z1 | T2 z2 | 3T 4z 5 7 | Q |
| 15 | Miku Ishii | T1 z1 | - | z6 | T2 z2 | T3 z3 | 3T 4z 6 12 | Q |
| 16 | Ai Mori | T1 z1 | T1 z1 | T5 z2 | z1 | - | 3T 4z 7 5 | Q |
| 17 | Nanami Nobe | T1 z1 | - | z5 | T3 z2 | T3 z3 | 3T 4z 7 11 | Q |
| 18 | Nanako Kura | T1 z1 | - | z2 | T2 z1 | T6 z1 | 3T 4z 9 5 | Q |
| 19 | Yui Suezawa | T1 z1 | T4 z4 | - | z2 | T5 z3 | 3T 4z 10 10 | Q |
| 20 | Sora Ito | T1 z1 | - | - | T3 z2 | T6 z6 | 3T 3z 10 9 | Q |
| 21 | Saki Kikuchi | T1 z1 | z1 | z4 | T1 z1 | z1 | 2T 5z 2 8 | |
| 22 | Mio Nukui | T1 z1 | z5 | z1 | T3 z1 | z2 | 2T 5z 4 10 | |
| 23 | Hina Sato | T1 z1 | z2 | z4 | T3 z1 | z5 | 2T 5z 4 13 | |
| 24 | Natsumi Oda | T1 z1 | z3 | z6 | z1 | T4 z4 | 2T 5z 5 15 | |
| 25 | Kanna Fujimura | T1 z1 | z4 | z3 | T1 z1 | - | 2T 4z 2 9 | |
| 26 | Kiki Matsuda | T1 z1 | z2 | z2 | T4 z4 | - | 2T 4z 5 9 | |
| 27 | Ryu Nakagawa | T1 z1 | - | z3 | T3 z1 | - | 2T 3z 4 5 | |
| 27 | Michika Nagashima | T1 z1 | - | z2 | T3 z2 | - | 2T 3z 4 5 | |
| 27 | Miu Ito | T1 z1 | - | z2 | T3 z2 | - | 2T 3z 4 5 | |
| 30 | Souka Hasegawa | T1 z1 | - | - | T4 z1 | z3 | 2T 3z 5 5 | |
| 31 | Moe Takiguchi | T2 z2 | - | - | - | T6 z6 | 2T 2z 8 8 | |
| 32 | Saaya Ishikuro | T1 z1 | - | - | - | T8 z8 | 2T 2z 9 9 | |
| 33 | Asuka Tubono | T2 z2 | z10 | z6 | z3 | z9 | 1T 5z 2 30 | |
| 34 | Natsuki Tanii | T1 z1 | z1 | z6 | z1 | - | 1T 4z 1 9 | |
| 35 | Mitsu Yamada | T1 z1 | z2 | z5 | z3 | - | 1T 4z 1 11 | |
| 35 | Riru Ueda | T1 z1 | - | z1 | z3 | z6 | 1T 4z 1 11 | |
| 37 | Hanao Inoue | T1 z1 | z2 | - | z5 | z9 | 1T 4z 1 17 | |
| 38 | Kohana Mugishima | T1 z1 | - | z10 | z3 | z7 | 1T 4z 1 21 | |
| 39 | Mai Kobayashi | T1 z1 | - | z1 | z5 | z15 | 1T 4z 1 22 | |
| 40 | Hatsune Takeishi | T2 z2 | - | z4 | z1 | z10 | 1T 4z 2 17 | |
| 41 | Risa Ota | T1 z1 | z2 | z2 | - | - | 1T 3z 1 5 | |
| 42 | Ichika Osawa | T1 z1 | - | - | z3 | z4 | 1T 3z 1 8 | |
| 42 | Chihiro Kaneko | T1 z1 | - | - | z2 | z5 | 1T 3z 1 8 | |
| 44 | Ayaka Kaji | T1 z1 | - | z1 | - | z7 | 1T 3z 1 9 | |
| 45 | Honoka Oda | T1 z1 | - | z6 | z3 | - | 1T 3z 1 10 | |
| 46 | Kokoro Takata | T1 z1 | - | z2 | z8 | - | 1T 3z 1 11 | |
| 47 | Nana Goto | T1 z1 | - | z2 | - | z13 | 1T 3z 1 16 | |
| 48 | Yuka Higuchi | T1 z1 | - | - | z2 | - | 1T 2z 1 3 | |
| 48 | Tsukushi Yamauchi | T1 z1 | - | z2 | - | - | 1T 2z 1 3 | |
| 50 | Shioi Tani | T1 z1 | - | z6 | - | - | 1T 2z 1 7 | |
| 51 | Utaha Sasaki | T2 z2 | - | - | z2 | - | 1T 2z 2 4 | |
| 52 | Aori Fukumitsu | T1 z1 | - | - | - | - | 1T 1z 1 1 | |
| 53 | Natsuki Sodeyama | z1 | - | - | - | z2 | 0T 2z 0 3 | |
| 54 | Sae Takahashi | z1 | - | - | - | - | 0T 1z 0 1 | |
