= Bouldering at the 2025 IFSC Climbing World Cup =

- Location: Keqiao, China; Curitiba, Brazil Salt Lake City, United States; Prague, Czech Republic; Bern, Switzerland Innsbruck, Austria
- Dates: 18 April – 29 June 2025

Champions
- Men: (Japan) Sorato Anraku
- Women: (France) Oriane Bertone

The 2025 season of the IFSC Climbing World Cup was the 26th season of the competition. Bouldering competitions were held at six stops of the IFSC Climbing World Cup. The bouldering season began on April 18 at the World Cup in Keqiao, and concluded on June 29 with the World Cup in Innsbruck. At each stop a qualifying was held on the first day of the competition, and the semi-final and final rounds were conducted on the second day of the competition. The winners were awarded trophies, and the best three finishers received medals. At the end of the season an overall ranking was determined based upon points, which athletes were awarded for finishing in the top 40 of each individual event.

Oriane Bertone won the women's season title. The men's season title went to Sorato Anraku while Japan defended its title in the national teams competition.

== Overview ==
Date	Location	Routesetters*	Men	Women
April, 18-20	Keqiao, China	(Spain) **Sergio Verdasco**; (Italy) Anna Borella; (France) Pierre Broyer	(Japan) Sorato Anraku	(United States) Anastasia Sanders
May, 16-18	Curitiba, Brazil	(France) **Remi Samyn**; (Argentina) Mauro Schwaszta; (Italy) Anna Borella	(Japan) Sorato Anraku	(France) Naïlé Meignan
May, 23-25	Salt Lake City, United States	(Japan) **Gen Hirashima**; (Italy) Stefan Scarperi; (Japan) Tsukasa Mizuguchi	(Japan) Sorato Anraku	(Japan) Mao Nakamura
June, 6-8	Prague, Czech Republic	(Switzerland) **Manuel Hassler**; (France) Pierre Broyer; (Argentina) Mauro Schwaszta	(France) Mejdi Schalck	(France) Oriane Bertone
June, 13-15	Bern, Switzerland	(France) **Remi Samyn**; (Spain) Sergio Verdasco; (China) Cai Luyan	(China) Pan Yufei	(United Kingdom) Erin McNeice
June, 25-29	Innsbruck, Austria	(Japan) **Tsukuru Hori**; (United Kingdom) Max Ayrton; (France) Maelys Agrapart	(United Kingdom) Toby Roberts	(Slovenia) Janja Garnbret
**OVERALL WINNERS**			(Japan) **Sorato Anraku**	(France) **Oriane Bertone**
**NATIONAL TEAM**			**Japan**	

* Chief routesetters are in bold.

== Overall ranking ==
The overall ranking is determined based upon points, which athletes are awarded for finishing in the top 40 of each individual event. The national ranking is the sum of the points of that country's three best male and female athletes. Results displayed (in brackets) are not counted.

=== Men ===
The results of the twenty most successful athletes of the Bouldering World Cup 2025:

Rank	Name	Points	Keqiao	Curitiba	Salt Lake City	Prague	Bern	Innsbruck
1	(Japan) Sorato Anraku	5300	1. 1000	1. 1000	1. 1000	2. 805	3. 690	2. 805
2	(France) Mejdi Schalck	4145	5. 545	2. 805	6. 495	1. 1000	2. 805	6. 495
3	(Japan) Sohta Amagasa	3240	9. 380	4. 610	2. 805	4. 610	9. 380	7. 455
4	(South Korea) Lee Dohyun	3105	2. 805	-	3. 690	7. 455	4. 610	5. 545
5	(Belgium) Hannes Van Duysen	2355	24. 105	15. 240	13. 280	6. 495	5. 545	3. 690
6	(France) Paul Jenft	1965	7. 455	7. 455	14. 260	-	6. 495	12. 300
7	(Japan) Tomoa Narasaki	1941	4. 610	3. 690	10. 337.5	41. 13.5	12. 290	-
8	(Slovenia) Anže Peharc	1925	16. 220	6. 495	18. 185	8. 415	15. 230	9. 380
9	(Japan) Meichi Narasaki	1875	3. 690	9. 380	5. 545	-	-	14. 260
10	(China) Pan Yufei	1764	36. 24	-	-	5. 545	1. 1000	17. 195
11	(United States) Colin Duffy	1504	18. 178	32. 33	4. 610	47. 9	7. 455	16. 220
12	(United Kingdom) Toby Roberts	1402	15. 240	-	-	20. 155	51. 7	1. 1000
13	(United Kingdom) Dayan Akhtar	1384	10. 350	-	12. 300	31. 39.5	8. 415	13. 280
14	(Japan) Yuji Fujiwaki	1155	20. 155	5. 545	7. 455	-	-	-
15	(Austria) Jan-Luca Posch	1028	17. 205	8. 415	31. 39	19. 170	18. 185	41. 13
16	(United Kingdom) Jack MacDougall	991	-	-	10. 337	9. 380	25. 78	17. 195
17	(United Kingdom) Maximillian Milne	950	-	-	16. 220	23. 120	-	4. 610
18	(Israel) Oren Prihed	906	8. 415	-	-	39. 16	10. 350	22. 125
19	(Japan) Rei Sugimoto	870	11. 325	22. 130	8. 415	-	-	-
20	(Germany) Elias Arriagada Krüger	768	27. 68	16. 220	20. 150	11. 325	-	53. 5

=== Women ===
The results of the twenty most successful athletes of the Bouldering World Cup 2025:

Rank	Name	Points	Keqiao	Curitiba	Salt Lake City	Prague	Bern	Innsbruck
1	(France) Oriane Bertone	4375	2. 805	2. 805	4. 610	1. 1000	10. 350	2. 805
2	(Japan) Mao Nakamura	3480	4. 610	4. 610	1. 1000	19. 170	5. 545	5. 545
3	(United States) Anastasia Sanders	3290	1. 1000	-	3. 690	12. 300	2. 805	6. 495
4	(Japan) Melody Sekikawa	2880	6. 495	5. 545	13. 280	3. 690	8. 415	7. 455
5	(Japan) Anon Matsufuji	2670	11. 270.83	7. 455	14. 260	5. 520	6. 475	3. 690
6	(United Kingdom) Erin McNeice	2512	3. 690	-	-	4. 610	1. 1000	16. 212.5
7	(Japan) Miho Nonaka	2370	5. 545	-	6. 495	9. 380	3. 690	13. 260
8	(Italy) Camilla Moroni	2213	27. 68	3. 690	11. 325	16. 220	12. 300	4. 610
9	(France) Agathe Calliet	2116	17. 178.75	14. 260	12. 300	2. 805	14. 260	11. 312.5
10	(France) Zélia Avezou	2035	-	15. 240	2. 805	-	4. 610	9. 380
11	(Australia) Oceania Mackenzie	1670	8. 415	-	7. 455	11. 325	6. 475	-
12	(France) Naïlé Meignan	1545	-	1. 1000	5. 545	-	-	-
13	(United States) Kyra Condie	1375	11. 270	13. 280	15. 240	17. 205	9. 380	-
14	(United Kingdom) Emma Edwards	1375	35. 25.5	-	10. 350	5. 520	16. 220	13. 260
15	(Italy) Giorgia Tesio	1147	31. 39	10. 350	20. 155	45. 10	18. 178	8. 415
16	(Slovenia) Jennifer Eucharia Buckley	1069	10. 350	-	-	7. 455	29. 52	16. 212
17	(Japan) Futaba Ito	1055	21. 145	6. 495	8. 415	-	-	-
18	(Slovenia) Janja Garnbret	1000	-	-	-	-	-	1. 1000
19	(United States) Cloe Coscoy	938	11. 270	9. 380	18. 185	39. 14	29. 52	31. 35
20	(South Korea) Seo Chae-hyun	904	7. 455	-	-	24. 100	25. 89	13. 260

* = Joint place with another athlete

=== National Teams ===
The results of the ten most successful countries of the Bouldering World Cup 2025:

Country names as used by the IFSC

Rank	Name	Points	Keqiao	Curitiba	Salt Lake City	Prague	Bern	Innsbruck
1	Japan	21812.5	3950	3950	4260	3295	3070	3287.5
2	France	18465.75	2478.75	3675	2920	4195	2815	2382
3	United Kingdom	9182.75	1441.5	241	1446	1956.5	1721.75	2376
4	United States	8535.98	1994.16	1144.33	2100.5	666.33	1699	931.66
5	Slovenia	5427.53	970.83	745	300	1010	478.7	1923
6	(South Korea) Korea	5035.82	1431.5	300	862	619.5	983.16	839.66
7	Italy	4818.83	162.3	1402	602	535.5	702.2	1414.83
8	Belgium	3791.15	171.5	740	524	889	705.25	761.4
9	Germany	3785.82	848.83	940	428	669	645	254.99
10	Austria	3264.18	417.75	978.33	351.5	631.75	396.75	488.1

== Keqiao, China (18-20 April) ==
=== Women ===
58 athletes attended the World Cup in Keqiao. Last year's winner Janja Garnbret did not compete. Anastasia Sanders (54.7) won in front of Oriane Bertone (44.9) as the only athlete to get 1 top and 3 zones. Miho Nonaka was the only athlete to top boulder 1 in the final. Erin McNeice (44.8) finished third.

Rank	Name	Score
1	(United States) Anastasia Sanders	54.7
2	(France) Oriane Bertone	44.9
3	(United Kingdom) Erin McNeice	44.8
4	(Japan) Mao Nakamura	44.4
5	(Japan) Miho Nonaka	44.1
6	(Japan) Melody Sekikawa	29.6
7	(South Korea) Seo Chae-hyun	19.6
8	(Australia) Oceania Mackenzie	9.9

=== Men ===
67 athletes attended the World Cup in Keqiao. Last year's winner Tomoa Narasaki did not achieve a podium place. Last year's overall World Cup winner Sorato Anraku (99.7) won the competition, being one of two athletes to top all problems in the final. Only 4 attempts separated him from silver medallist Lee Dohyun (99.3). The Japanese team finished with four athletes in the Top 5 including Tomoa Narasaki (69.6) and Meichi Narasaki (83.9), who rounded out the podium.

Rank	Name	Score
1	(Japan) Sorato Anraku	99.7
2	(South Korea) Lee Dohyun	99.3
3	(Japan) Meichi Narasaki	83.9
4	(Japan) Tomoa Narasaki	69.6
5	(France) Mejdi Schalck	69.5
6	(France) Sam Avezou	69.5
7	(France) Paul Jenft	44.6
8	(Israel) Oren Prihed	29.7

== Curitiba, Brazil (16-18 May) ==
=== Women ===
44 athletes attended the World Cup in Curitiba — the first World Cup held in South America. The final round saw few tops on the fourth boulder — only the medallists topped it. Naïlé Meignan (99.6) won the competition, flashing 3 of the 4 final boulders. Oriane Bertone (99.5) came in second by virtue of having used one attempt more than Meignan in the final. Curitiba 2025 marked Meignan's first World Cup win.

Rank	Name	Score
1	(France) Naïlé Meignan	99.6
2	(France) Oriane Bertone	99.5
3	(Italy) Camilla Moroni	83.8
4	(Japan) Mao Nakamura	69.7
5	(Japan) Melody Sekikawa	69.5
6	(Japan) Futaba Ito	69.4
7	(Japan) Anon Matsufuji	49.5
8	(United States) Nekaia Sanders	34.8

=== Men ===
56 athletes attended the World Cup in Curitiba. Keqiao winner Sorato Anraku dominated the semi-final, topping all four boulders and getting the only top on the technical fourth boulder. A low-scoring final round saw only Sorato Anraku (69.7) and Mejdi Schalck (58.9) topping boulders. Anraku won the competition, earning his second consecutive gold medal in the 2025 Boulder season. He was the only athlete to make it to the top of the third boulder. Schalck was the only athlete to top the fourth boulder. However, missing the crucial zone on the third boulder and making more attempts than Anraku left him to settle for silver.

Rank	Name	Score
1	(Japan) Sorato Anraku	69.7
2	(France) Mejdi Schalck	58.9
3	(Japan) Tomoa Narasaki	39.0
4	(Japan) Sohta Amagasa	29.5
5	(Japan) Yuji Fujiwaki	19.6
6	(Slovenia) Anže Peharc	19.3
7	(France) Paul Jenft	19.2
8	(Austria) Jan-Luca Posch	9.3

== Salt Lake City, United States (23-25 May) ==
=== Women ===
50 athletes attended the World Cup in Salt Lake City. Last year's winner Natalia Grossman did not compete in the World Cup due to a torn ACL. Mao Nakamura (84.7) won her first World Cup after finishing fourth on three occasions in previous World Cups. Zélia Avezou (70.0) won Silver over Anastasia Sanders (70.0) by virtue of her better semi-final score. The women's final was criticised for poor separation of scores — only 6 attempts (0.6) separated 2nd place from 6th place.

Rank	Name	Score
1	(Japan) Mao Nakamura	84.7
2	(France) Zélia Avezou	70.0
3	(United States) Anastasia Sanders	70.0
4	(France) Oriane Bertone	70.0
5	(France) Naïlé Meignan	69.9
6	(Japan) Miho Nonaka	69.4
7	(Australia) Oceania Mackenzie	44.8
8	(Japan) Futaba Ito	44.3

=== Men ===
61 athletes attended the World Cup in Salt Lake City. In the final Sorato Anraku (84.4) was the only athlete to top 3 of the 4 boulders, winning his third consecutive Boulder World Cup of the 2025 season. Sohta Amagasa (69.6) came in second and Lee Dohyun (69.5) finished in third place. Salt Lake City also marked Japanese veteran Rei Sugimoto's final World Cup in his 14 year IFSC World Cup career.

Rank	Name	Score
1	(Japan) Sorato Anraku	84.4
2	(Japan) Sohta Amagasa	69.6
3	(South Korea) Lee Dohyun	69.5
4	(United States) Colin Duffy	59.6
5	(Japan) Meichi Narasaki	54.8
6	(France) Mejdi Schalck	54.4
7	(Japan) Yuji Fujiwaki	44.3
8	(Japan) Rei Sugimoto	29.5

== Prague, Czech Republic (6-8 June) ==
=== Women ===
77 athletes attended the World Cup in Prague. The women's final in Prague was cancelled due to windy weather conditions and the inability to ensure the safety of the athletes and spectators. The final results were based on semi-final standings instead. Oriane Bertone (84.8) won the competition, repeating her win in Prague last year. Agathe Calliet (69.7) and Melody Sekikawa (69.5) completed the podium, earning their first IFSC World Cup medals.

Rank	Name	Score
1	(France) Oriane Bertone	84.8
2	(France) Agathe Calliet	69.7
3	(Japan) Melody Sekikawa	69.5
4	(United Kingdom) Erin McNeice	69.3
5	(United Kingdom) Emma Edwards	54.5
5	(Japan) Anon Matsufuji	54.5
7	(Slovenia) Jennifer Eucharia Buckley	54.1
8	(Spain) Geila Macià Martín	53.8

=== Men ===
89 athletes attended the World Cup in Prague. None of the previous medallists at the 2024 Prague World Cup managed to reach the podium this year. Mejdi Schalck (99.1) won the competition in front of Sorato Anraku (84.1). The men's final received significant backlash from netizens for its parkour style, achieving little separation, particularly on the first and third boulders — all finalists topped the first boulder and only Peharc did not top the third boulder. Anraku and Samuel Richard (84.1) had identical final scores. Anraku was awarded the silver medal by virtue of his better semi-final performance.

Rank	Name	Score
1	(France) Mejdi Schalck	99.1
2	(Japan) Sorato Anraku	84.1
3	(France) Samuel Richard	84.1
4	(Japan) Sohta Amagasa	69.5
5	(China) Pan Yufei	69.2
6	(Belgium) Hannes Van Duysen	69.0
7	(South Korea) Lee Dohyun	59.9
8	(Slovenia) Anze Peharc	44.2

== Bern, Switzerland (13-15 June) ==
=== Women ===
67 athletes attended the World Cup in Bern. A tough semi-finals round saw only thirteen boulder tops spread amongst the semi-finalists. Erin McNeice (99.5) won her first World Cup, topping all 4 boulders in the final. Anastasia Sanders (84.4) took the silver. Miho Nonaka won bronze, making her first podium since her bronze in Innsbruck two years before.

Rank	Name	Score
1	(United Kingdom) Erin McNeice	99.5
2	(United States) Anastasia Sanders	84.4
3	(Japan) Miho Nonaka	84.3
4	(France) Zélia Avezou	74.3
5	(Japan) Mao Nakamura	69.7
6	(Japan) Anon Matsufuji	69.6
6	(Australia) Oceania Mackenzie	69.6
8	(Japan) Melody Sekikawa	54.0

=== Men ===
87 athletes attended the World Cup in Bern. Lee Dohyun was the only athlete to top all 4 boulders in the low-scoring semi-finals round where half of the semi-finalists could not get a boulder top. In the final Pan Yufei (84.2) topped three of the four boulders, winning his first World Cup in front of Mejdi Schalck (84.1) and Sorato Anraku (83.7). All three medallists secured three tops and a zone, with attempts deciding the podium places.

Rank	Name	Score
1	(China) Pan Yufei	84.2
2	(France) Mejdi Schalck	84.1
3	(Japan) Sorato Anraku	83.7
4	(South Korea) Lee Dohyun	54.5
5	(Belgium) Hannes Van Duysen	54.4
6	(France) Paul Jenft	29.4
7	(United States) Colin Duffy	19.8
8	(United Kingdom) Dayan Akhtar	19.4

== Innsbruck, Austria (25-29 June) ==
=== Women ===
79 athletes attended the World Cup in Innsbruck. This marked Janja Garnbret's first World Cup appearance since Koper last year. Bern winner Erin McNeice failed to advance past the semi-final round. Going into the third boulder of the final, Garnbret and Anon Matsufuji topped boulders one and two while the other finalists had all failed to top the second boulder. Garnbret had fallen behind on number of attempts, however. As Matsufuji could not find a zone or top on the third boulder Garnbret seized the chance to take the lead, flashing the final two boulders. Oriane Bertone (69.8) came in second and Matsufuji (59.5) finished third, her first podium since Hachioji two years before.

Rank	Name	Score
1	(Slovenia) Janja Garnbret	99.3
2	(France) Oriane Bertone	69.8
3	(Japan) Anon Matsufuji	59.5
4	(Italy) Camilla Moroni	53.8
5	(Japan) Mao Nakamura	53.6
6	(United States) Anastasia Sanders	44.6
7	(Japan) Melody Sekikawa	29.3
8	(Italy) Giorgia Tesio	10.0

=== Men ===
109 athletes attended the World Cup in Innsbruck. Bern winner Pan Yufei failed to advance past the semi-final round. Olympic champion Toby Roberts made it to his first final of the 2025 boulder season after failing to advance past the qualifiying round in Bern. Roberts (69.8) went on to win the competition over Sorato Anraku (69.6) who could not top the fourth boulder, allowing Roberts to overtake him on attempts. Hannes Van Duysen (54.6) won the bronze medal.

Rank	Name	Score
1	(United Kingdom) Toby Roberts	69.8
2	(Japan) Sorato Anraku	69.6
3	(Belgium) Hannes Van Duysen	54.6
4	(United Kingdom) Maximillian Milne	54.5
5	(South Korea) Lee Dohyun	44.9
6	(France) Mejdi Schalck	44.3
7	(Japan) Sohta Amagasa	39.9
8	(Austria) Nicolai Uznik	19.3
