= Hannes Van Duysen =

Belgian rock climber

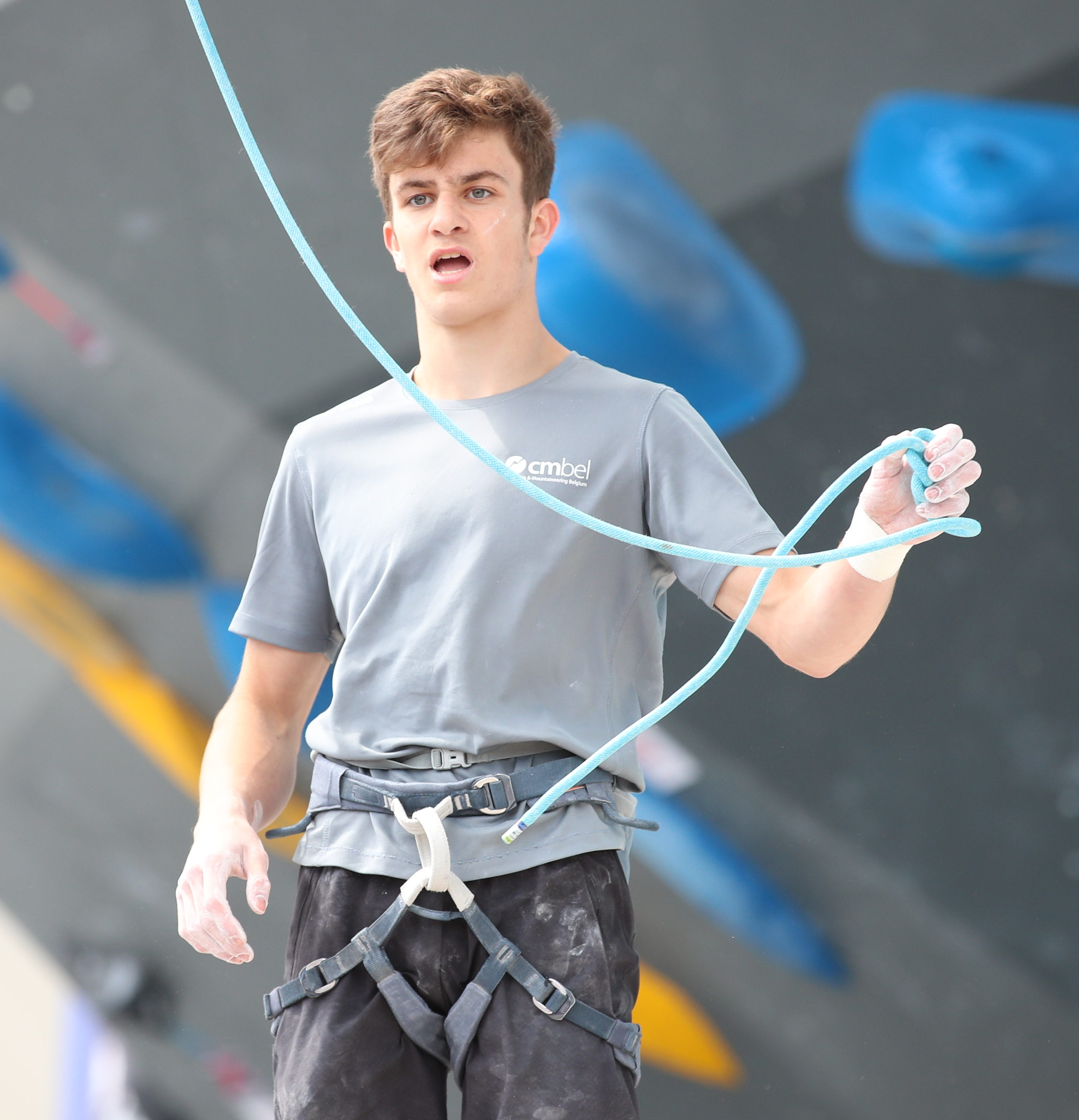

Personal information
- Born: 4 September 2004 (age 21) Vinderhoute, Belgium
- Height: 173 cm (5 ft 8 in)

Climbing career
- Type of climber: Competition climbing; Bouldering; Sport climbing
- Highest grade: Bouldering: 8B+ (V14)
Medal record
Men's competition climbing
Representing Belgium
World Cup (Event)
Silver medal – second place	Hachioji 2023	Boulder
Bronze medal – third place	Bern 2026	Boulder
Bronze medal – third place	Innsbruck 2025	Boulder
Bronze medal – third place	Keqiao 2024	Boulder
European Championships
Silver medal – second place	Barcelona 2026	Boulder

Hannes Van Duysen (born 2004) is a Belgian rock climber who specialises in competition climbing, competition in both the lead climbing and bouldering events.

== Climbing career ==
=== Competition climbing ===
==== Youth ====
Van Duysen began competing at IFSC Climbing World Youth Championships in 2018. At age 16, he won the boulder title at the 2021 Youth World Championships. He won a second consecutive boulder title at the 2022 Youth World Championships. In 2023, he placed third in boulder and first in Lead respectively at the Youth World Championships in Seoul.

==== Senior ====
Van Duysen began competing in senior competitions at age 16, entering the World Cups in 2021. In 2023, Van Duysen made his first IFSC World Cup bouldering final in Hachioji, finishing in second place. In 2024, he won the bronze medal at the Keqiao bouldering World Cup. Van Duysen secured his berth to the 2024 Summer Olympics in Paris through the Olympic Qualifier Series. At the Olympics, he finished in fourteenth place in the semifinals of the combined event and did not advance to the finals. In 2025, he advanced to the finals in three of the six bouldering World Cups, notably placing third in Innsbruck.

=== Rock climbing ===
In 2024, Van Duysen made the 6th ascent of the famous 9a+ (5.15a) graded deep-water soloing route, Es Pontàs.

== Rankings ==
=== IFSC Olympic Qualification ===
Discipline	Shanghai 2024	Budapest 2024
Boulder & Lead	6	4

=== World Championships ===
Discipline	Bern 2023	Seoul 2025
Boulder	25	15
Lead	29	-
Boulder & Lead	32	-

=== World Cup Overall Ranking ===
Discipline	2022	2023	2024	2025
Boulder	72	8	21	5
Lead	70	70	35	17

=== World Youth Championships ===
Discipline	2021 Youth A	2022 Juniors	2023 Juniors
Boulder	1	1	3
Lead	6	10	1

== Notable ascents ==
=== Boulder problems ===
8B+ (V14):

- La Force du Destin - Fontainebleau (FRA) - 2022
- Mécanique Élémentaire - Recloses (FRA) - 2022

=== Redpointed routes ===
9a+ (5.15a):

- Es Pontàs - Mallorca (ESP) - October 2024

== See also ==
- List of grade milestones in rock climbing
- History of rock climbing
