= World Climbing Asia Series =

Competition climbing event

The World Climbing Asia Series, formerly known as the IFSC Climbing Asian Cup, is a series of Asian climbing competitions organized by World Climbing.

== Asian Cups/Asia Series ==
Edition	Year	Location	Date(s)	Disciplines
1	2001	(China) Kunming	14 September 2001	L + S
	2004	(India) Uttarkashi	19 - 21 November 2004	L + S
	2007	(China) Changsha	5 - 6 November 2007	L + S
	2009	(Thailand) Krabi	17 - 18 April 2009	B
	2012	(China) Chengdu	3 - 4 November 2012	L + S
	2017	(China) Wanxianshan	27 - 29 October 2017	L + S + B
	2018	Hong Kong	10 - 11 March 2018	B
	2018	(Thailand) Bangkok	15 - 17 June 2018	B + S
	2019	Hong Kong	9 - 10 March 2019	B
	2022	(Philippines) Manila	5 - 6 November 2022	B
	2023	(Saudi Arabia) Riyadh	12 - 16 December 2023	L + S + B
	2025	Hong Kong	8 - 9 March 2025	B
	2025	(Kazakhstan) Almaty	29 - 31 August 2025	L + S
	2026	(South Korea) Gunsan	31 October - 1 November 2026	B + S

== Men's results ==
=== Lead ===
Year	Gold	Silver	Bronze
2001	(South Korea) Sangwon Son	(South Korea) Jae-Yong Lee	(South Korea) Kyu-Bog Cho
2004	(South Korea) Janghyuk Kim	(Iran) Mohammad Jafari Mahmoudabadi	(Hong Kong) Ka-Wai Chu
2007	(Japan) Kazuma Watanabe	(China) Changzhong Liu	(South Korea) Janghyuk Kim (Japan) Keita Mogaki
2012	(South Korea) Hyunbin Min	(South Korea) Jabee Kim	(China) ZiDa Ma
2017	(Japan) Yoshiyuki Ogata	(Japan) Kokoro Fujii	(Japan) Takuma Numajiri
2023	(Japan) Hidemasa Nishida	(Japan) Hiroto Shimizu	(Japan) Manato Kurashiki
2025	(Japan) Ao Yurikusa	(Japan) Hareru Nagamori	(Japan) Hiroto Shimizu

=== Speed ===
Year	Gold	Silver	Bronze
2001	(Indonesia) Ronald Mamarimbing	(Singapore) Bin Mohd Yusof Mohd Yazid	(South Korea) Kyu-Bog Cho
2004	(China) Xiaojie Chen	(Hong Kong) Chi-Wai Lai	(Malaysia) Hafzanizam Bokhari
2007	(China) QiXin Zhong	(China) Xiaojie Chen	(China) Hetai Ma
2012	(China) QiXin Zhong	(China) Lincai Zhong	(Indonesia) Aspar Jaelolo
2017	(Kazakhstan) Amir Maimuratov	(Kazakhstan) Artyom Devyaterikov	(China) JinXin Li
2018 (THA)	(China) QiXin Zhong	(Kazakhstan) Alimzhan Myrzabekov	(Kazakhstan) Amir Maimuratov
2023	(Iran) Reza Alipour	(Kazakhstan) Alisher Murat	(Kazakhstan) Matvey Yessipov
2025	(Kazakhstan) Rishat Khaibullin	(Japan) Tsukika Onishi	(Japan) Ryo Omasa
2026	(China) Wang Ruifeng	(China) Li Xue	(China) Huang Jingjie

=== Bouldering ===
Year	Gold	Silver	Bronze
2017	(Japan) Kokoro Fujii	(China) HaiBin Qu	(Singapore) Chua Dennis
2018 (HKG)	(Philippines) Gerald Verosil	(China) DiChong Huang	(China) YuFei Pan
2018 (THA)	(Hong Kong) Ka-chun Yau	(Hong Kong) Cheung-chi Shoji Chan	(Hong Kong) Chi-fung AU
2019	(Hong Kong) Cheung-chi Shoji Chan	(Hong Kong) Ka-chun Yau	(Singapore) Chua Dennis
2022	(Japan) Yuji Fujiwaki	(Japan) Keita Watabe	(Singapore) Luke Goh Wen Bin
2023	(Japan) Tomoaki Takata	(Japan) Manato Kurashiki	(Japan) Yusuke Sugimoto
2025	(Japan) Ritsu Kayotani	(Japan) Keita Dohi	(Hong Kong) Cheung-chi Shoji Chan
2026	(South Korea) Lee Jihoo	(South Korea) Jung Chanjin	(Japan) Kento Yamaguchi

== Women's results ==
=== Lead ===
Year	Gold	Silver	Bronze
2001	(Hong Kong) Hiu Ying Liu	(Hong Kong) Shun-Yuk Choi	(South Korea) Hyun-Jung Kim
2004	(Hong Kong) Hiu Ying Liu	(Japan) Yasve Minamiura	(China) Chunhua Li
2007	(China) Li-Ping Huang	(Indonesia) Ilmawaty Labanu	(Japan) Rie Kimura
2012	(China) LaMu RENQING	(China) Xuhua PAN	(Hong Kong) Hiu Ying Liu
2017	(Japan) Aya Onoe	(South Korea) Lan Kim	(Iran) Elnaz Rekabi
2023	(Japan) Risa Ota	(Japan) Mashiro Kuzuu	(Japan) Honoka Oda
2025	(Japan) Natsumi Hirano	(Iran) Sarina Ghaffari	(Japan) Sana Ogura

=== Speed ===
Year	Gold	Silver	Bronze
2001	(Indonesia) Agung Ethi Hendrawati	(South Korea) Joung-Mi Kim	(Hong Kong) Shun-Yuk Choi
2004	(China) Chunhua Li	(India) Archana B.S.	(India) Dashini Dev
2007	(Indonesia) Evi Neliwati	(China) Chunhua Li	(China) CuiLian He
2012	(China) yang wang	(China) LaMu RENQING	(China) Xuhua PAN
2017	(China) CuiLian He	(Kazakhstan) Assel Marlenova	(China) Xuhua PAN
2018 (THA)	(China) MingWei NI	(Thailand) Narada Disyabut	(Kazakhstan) Margarita Agambayeva
2023	(Chinese Taipei) Hung Ying Lee	(India) Anisha Verma	(India) Shivpreet Pannu
2025	(Kazakhstan) Anna Balarshina	(Kazakhstan) Tamara Ulzhabayeva	(Kazakhstan) Adeliya Utesheva
2026	(South Korea) Jeong Jimin	(China) Fan Jingyue	(Japan) Ren Koyamatsu

=== Bouldering ===
Year	Gold	Silver	Bronze
2017	(Iran) Elnaz Rekabi	(Singapore) Vanessa Si Yinn Teng	(Kazakhstan) Tamara Ulzhabayeva
2018 (HKG)	(Japan) Mei Kotake	(South Korea) Sol Sa	(Singapore) Vanessa Si Yinn Teng
2018 (THA)	(South Korea) Heeyeon Park	(Singapore) Mingxin, Judith Sim	(Thailand) Pankaew Plypoolsup
2019	(Chinese Taipei) Hung Ying Lee	(Chinese Taipei) Hsiu-Ju Lin	(Thailand) Puntarika Tunyavanich
2022	(Japan) Anon Matsufuji	(Japan) Mashiro Kuzuu	(Hong Kong) Tseng-Shun Wong
2023	(Japan) Ai Takeuchi	(Japan) Mashiro Kuzuu	(Iran) Elnaz Rekabi
2025	(Japan) Manami Yama	(Japan) Kaho Murakoshi	(Japan) Yui Suezawa
2026	(Japan) Manami Yama	(South Korea) Seo Chae-hyun	(South Korea) Oh Gayeong
