= Rei Sugimoto =

Japanese competition climber

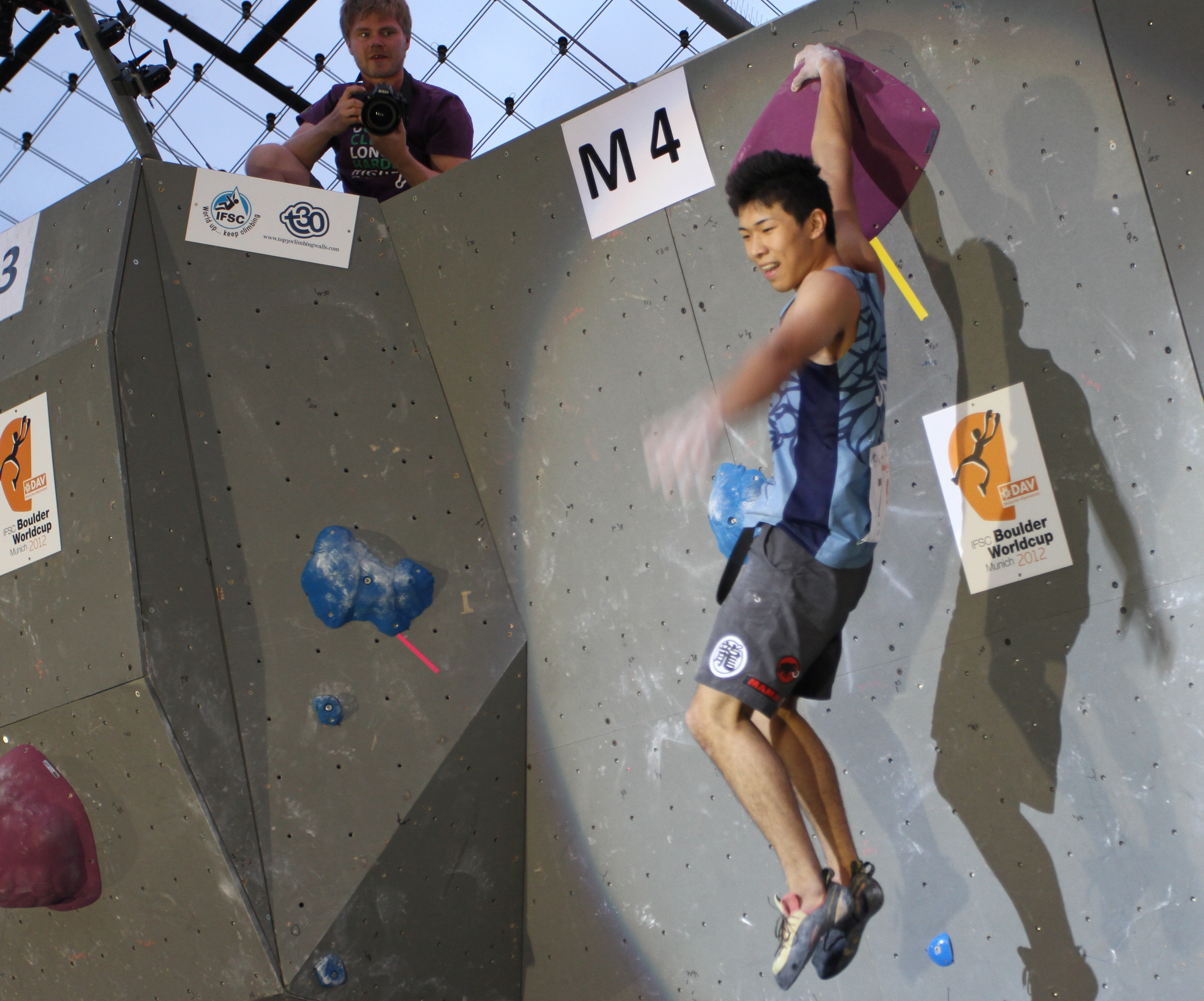

Personal information
- Nationality: Japanese
- Born: November 13, 1991 (age 35) Sapporo, Japan
- Occupation: Professional sport climber
- Height: 170 cm (5 ft 7 in)

Climbing career
- Type of climber: Sport Climbing; Competition bouldering
- Known for: Winner of multiple world cup medals
Medal record
Event / 1st / 2nd / 3rd; World Cup / 2 / 1 / 2
Men's competition climbing
Representing Japan
World Cup (Overall)
Third place	2018	Bouldering
World Cup
Gold medal – first place	Vail 2018	Bouldering
Gold medal – first place	Munich 2013	Bouldering
Silver medal – second place	Navi Mumbai 2017	Bouldering
Bronze medal – third place	Meiringen 2019	Bouldering
Bronze medal – third place	Hachioji 2018	Bouldering
Asian Championships
Silver medal – second place	Kurayoshi 2018	Combined
Silver medal – second place	Ningbo 2015	Bouldering

Rei Sugimoto (杉本 怜, Sugimoto Rei, born November 13, 1991) is a Japanese professional rock climber, specializing in competition climbing.

== Climbing career ==
=== Competition climbing ===
Sugimoto started competing on the IFSC Climbing World Cup circuit in 2009.

In 2011, Sugimoto reached his first bouldering final at the Vail World Cup, placing fourth.

In 2012, Sugimoto was a finalist in three of the six Bouldering World Cups. He rounded out the 2012 season by finishing sixth at the World Championships in Paris.

In 2013, Sugimoto won his first Bouldering World Cup in Munich.

In 2015, Sugimoto won the silver medal in the bouldering discipline at the Asian Championships held in Ningbo.

In 2017, he won the silver medal at the bouldering World Cup in Navi Mumbai.

In 2018, he won the bronze medal at the bouldering World Cup in Hachioji and won his second career World Cup gold medal later in Vail. He won the silver medal in the combined event at the 2018 Asian Championships held in Kurayoshi.

In 2019, Sugimoto won the bronze medal at the Bouldering World Cup in Meiringen. In 2021, he did not advance to the finals at the Bouldering World Cups. In 2023, he competed at the Hachioji Bouldering World Cup but did not advance past the qualification round.

In 2025, Sugimoto placed third in his final Boulder Japan Cup, successfully returning to Japan's national team after 2 years. He reached the finals at the 2025 Salt Lake City World Cup, placing eighth in the final World Cup event of his career.

== Rankings ==
=== Climbing World Cup ===
Discipline	2009	2010	2011	2012	2013	2014	2015	2016	2017	2018	2019	2021
Bouldering	67	37	28	7	10	23	9	34	6	3	11	17

=== Climbing World Championships ===
Discipline	2009	2012	2014	2018	2019	2025
Bouldering	23	6	18	27	7	33
Lead	–	–	–	73	–	–
Speed	–	–	–	47	–	–
Combined	–	–	–	31	–	–

=== Japan Cup ===
Discipline	2009	2010	2011	2012	2013	2014	2015	2016	2017	2018	2019	2020	2021	2022	2023	2024	2025
Bouldering	3	-	12	6	4	2	1	2	4	6	5	8	7	-	8	18	3
