= Mizugaki =

Climbing area of Yamanashi Prefecture, Japan

Mizugaki is a climbing area in Japan, located in the northern part of the Yamanashi Prefecture. The forest of Mizugaki is owned by the Emperor of Japan.

It is known for highball bouldering and long trad lines. The rock consists of granite with many natural pockets. Because of the higher altitude it is also possible to climb in Mizugaki during the summer.

Jason Kehl can be seen climbing in Mizugaki in the movie Big in Japan.
