= Yokkaichi Dome =

Indoor sporting arena in Yokkaichi, Mie, Japan

Coordinates: 34°58′59″N 136°38′51″E

Yokkaicchi Dome
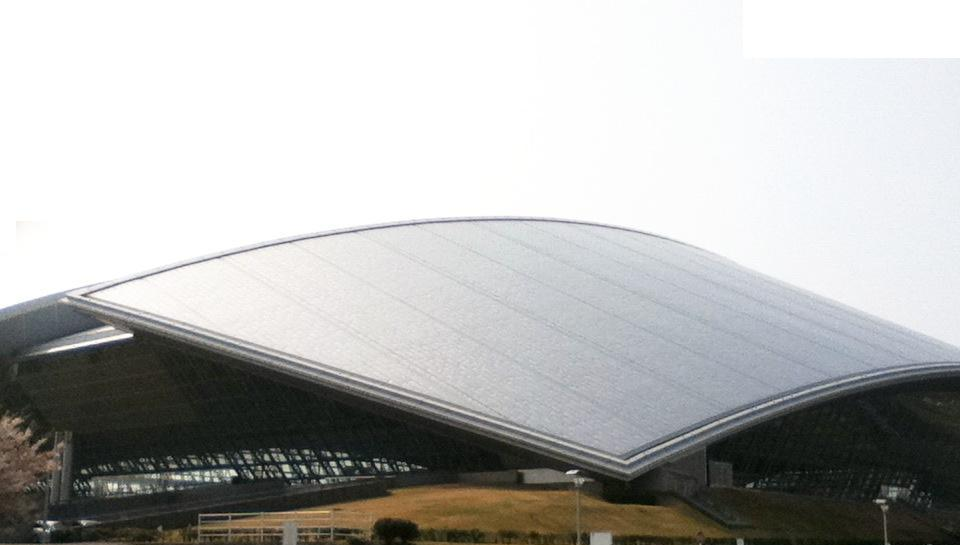
- Interactive map of Yokkaicchi Dome
- Location: Yokkaichi, Mie, Japan
- Capacity: 4,704
- Surface: Short Pile Artificial turf
- Field size: 124.45 meters × 78.00 meters (9,707m^{2})

Construction
- Opened: August 1, 1997

Yokkaichi Dome is a multi-purpose indoor sporting arena located in Yokkaichi, Mie Prefecture, Japan. The capacity of the arena is 4,704 people. It was built in 1997 as one of the events commemorating the 100th anniversary of the establishment of Yokkaichi as a city.

Adjacent to the Dome is Kasumigaura Ryokuchi Park.
