= Keita Watabe =

Japanese climber

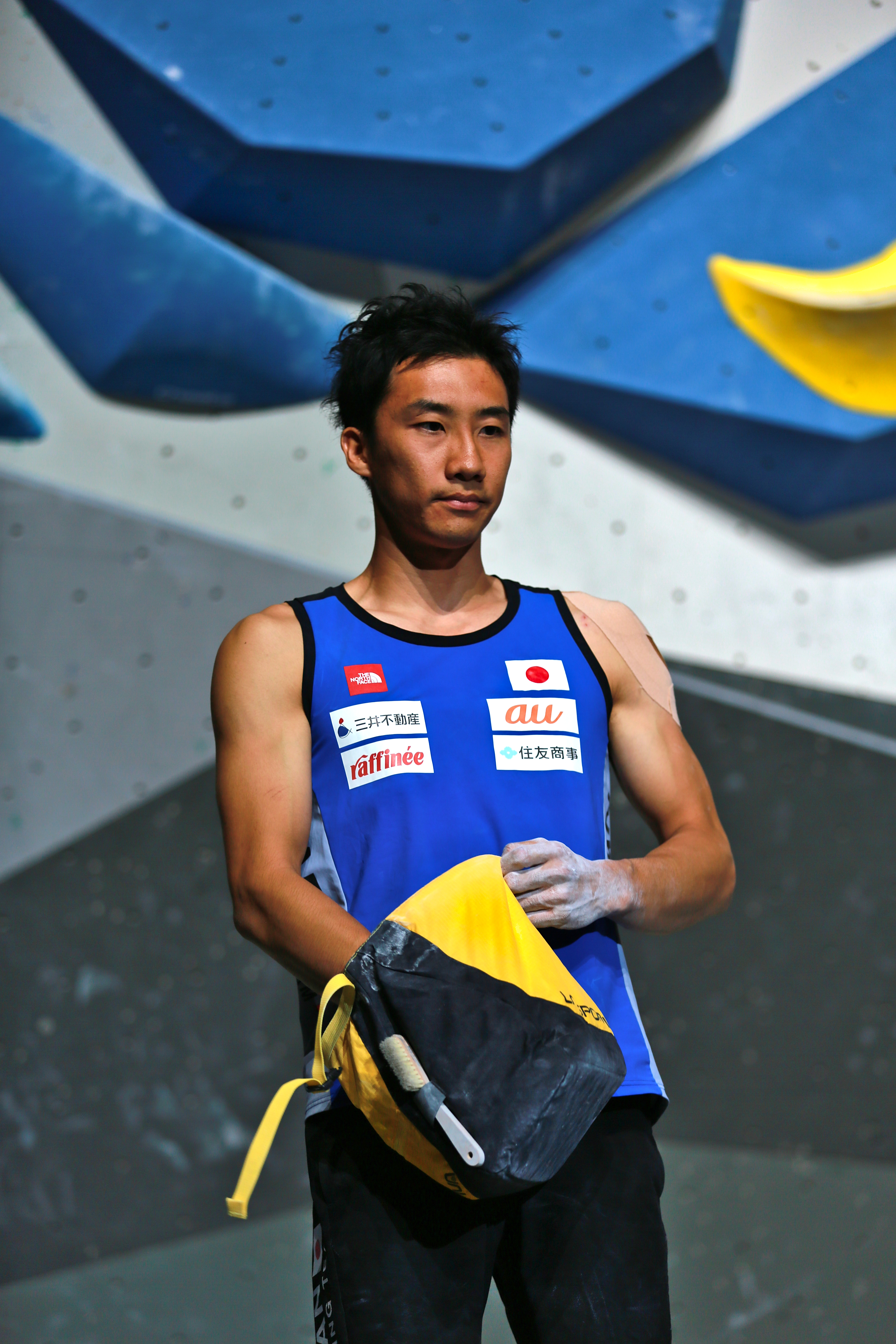
- Watabe at the 2018 IFSC Climbing World Championships

Personal information
- Nationality: Japanese
- Born: August 30, 1993 (age 33) Yokkaichi, Mie, Japan

Climbing career
- Type of climber: Competition bouldering
Medal record
Men's competition climbing
Representing Japan
World Cup (Event)
Gold medal – first place	Nanjing 2017	Boulder
Bronze medal – third place	Hachioji 2017	Boulder
Bronze medal – third place	Meiringen 2017	Boulder
Asian Championships
Silver medal – second place	2018	Boulder
Bronze medal – third place	2017	Boulder
Asian Cup
Silver medal – second place	Manila 2022	Boulder

Keita Watabe (渡部 桂太 Watabe Keita, born August 30, 1993) is a Japanese professional rock climber, specializing in competition bouldering.

== Competition climbing ==
Watabe began climbing on the IFSC Climbing World Cup circuit in 2015.

In 2017, Watabe reached the boulder final at the IFSC World Cup in Meiringen, winning a bronze medal in his first World Cup final.

At the 2017 IFSC Climbing World Cup in Nanjing, he won his first gold in an IFSC World Cup, followed by a bronze medal at the Hachioji World Cup later in May.

At the 2017 Asian Championships in Tehran, Watabe placed third in the boulder discipline, completing the all-Japanese podium behind compatriots Kokoro Fujii and Yoshiyuki Ogata.

In 2018, Watabe advanced to the final at the 2018 IFSC Climbing World Championships, finishing fourth in the boulder discipline. He won the silver medal at the 2018 Asian Championships held in Kurayoshi later in November.

In 2019, Watabe won the silver medal at the 2019 World Beach Games.

In 2022, he placed second at the Asian Cup in Manila.

== Rankings ==
=== World Cup ===
Discipline	2017
Boulder	4

=== World Championships ===
Discipline	Innsbruck 2018
Boulder	4

=== Japan Cup ===
Discipline	2015	2016	2017
Boulder	2	5	2

== Notable ascents ==
=== Boulder problems ===
8B+ (V14):

- The Globalist – Sipoo (FIN) – October 2025 – Fifth ascent.
- Circus Elephant Syndrome – Sipoo (FIN) – October 2025 – Third ascent.
