= Yuji Fujiwaki =

Japanese competition climber (born 1995)

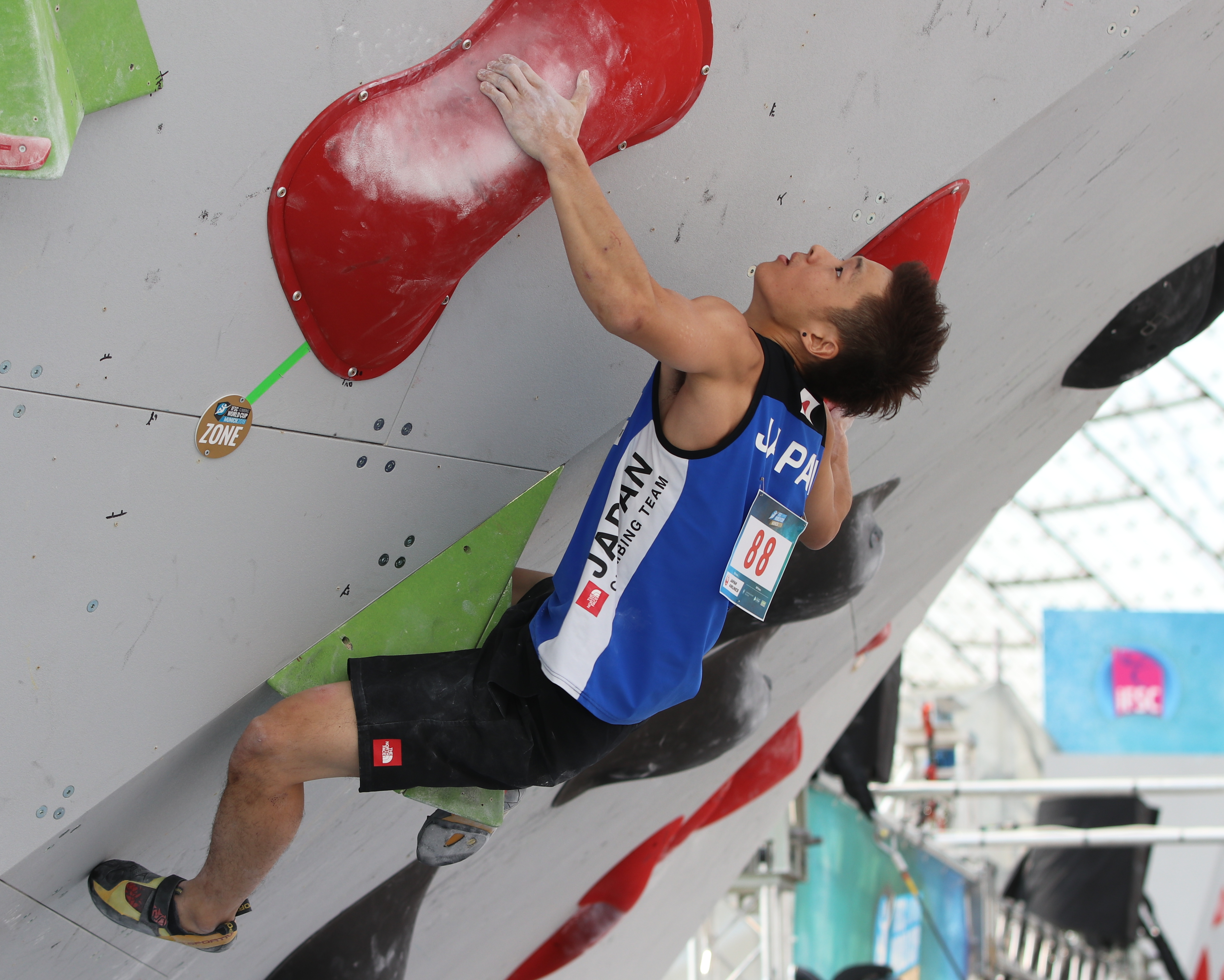

Personal information
- Nationality: Japanese
- Born: October 24, 1995 (age 31) Osaka, Japan
- Occupation: Professional climber
- Height: 170 cm (5 ft 7 in)

Climbing career
- Type of climber: Competition bouldering
Medal record
Men's competition climbing
Representing Japan
Asian Cup
| Gold medal – first place | Manila 2022 | Bouldering |

Yuji Fujiwaki (藤脇 祐二, Fujiwaki Yuji, born October 24, 1995) is a Japanese professional rock climber, specializing in competition bouldering.

== Early life ==
Yuji Fujiwaki was born in Osaka on 24 October 1995. At his mother’s suggestion, he took up climbing, as she believed it suited his abilities. He had enjoyed climbing trees from a young age and began training in climbing gyms at age 14.

== Climbing career ==
=== Competition climbing ===
In June 2018, Fujiwaki clinched a Silver in the Bouldering and Bronze in the Combined discipline at the FISU University Championships in Bratislava.

In August 2018, Fujiwaki placed fifth in his first IFSC Bouldering World Cup final in Munich.

Fujiwaki won the IFSC Climbing Asian Cup in bouldering in 2022.

In 2025, Fujiwaki finished second at the Boulder Japan Cup. During the 2025 Boulder World Cup season, he reached the finals in two out of the three events he competed in, marking his return to the Bouldering World Cup finals after a seven-year absence. He placed fifth and seventh in Curitiba and Salt Lake City respectively. He ended the season in tenth place at his first World Championships in Seoul.

== Rankings ==
=== World Championships ===
| Discipline | Seoul 2025 |
|---|---|
| Bouldering | 10 |

=== World Cup ===
| Discipline | 2016 | 2017 | 2018 | 2019 | 2022 | 2023 | 2024 | 2025 |
|---|---|---|---|---|---|---|---|---|
| Bouldering | 37 | 23 | 9 | 29 | 17 | 28 | 12 | 14 |

=== Japan Cup ===
| Discipline | 2015 | 2016 | 2017 | 2018 | 2019 | 2020 | 2021 | 2022 | 2023 | 2024 | 2025 | 2026 |
|---|---|---|---|---|---|---|---|---|---|---|---|---|
| Bouldering | 59 | 16 | 7 | 9 | 10 | 3 | 17 | 5 | 5 | 3 | 2 | 12 |
| Lead | - | - | - | - | 20 | 28 | 12 | 26 | 17 | 9 | 12 | 25 |
