= Anon Matsufuji =

Japanese competition climber

Personal information
- Nationality: Japanese
- Born: October 18, 2003 (age 23) Kanagawa, Japan
- Occupation: Professional rock climber
- Height: 160 cm (5 ft 3 in)

Climbing career
- Type of climber: Competition bouldering
- Known for: 2024 Asian Championships Boulder Winner
Medal record
Women's competition climbing
Representing Japan
World Cup (Event)
Bronze medal – third place	Innsbruck 2025	Boulder
Bronze medal – third place	Hachioji 2023	Boulder
Asian Championships
Gold medal – first place	Tai'an 2024	Boulder
Asian Cup
Gold medal – first place	Manila 2022	Boulder
- Updated on June 28, 2025

Anon Matsufuji (松藤 藍夢 Matsufuji Anon; born October 18, 2003) is a Japanese competition climber who specializes in competition bouldering.

== Climbing career ==
=== Competition climbing ===
Matsufuji made her senior international competition climbing debut in 2022. She placed fifth at the World Cup event in Brixen, Italy. Matsufuji subsequently won her first title at the IFSC Asia - Continental Cup in November 2022.

In April 2023, Matsufuji finished on the podium at the World Cup event in Hachioji, Japan, collecting the bronze medal in her second-ever World Cup final.

In 2024, Matsufuji won the gold medal in the women's boulder final at the IFSC Asian Championships Tai'an 2024.

At the 2025 IFSC Boulder World Cup in Innsbruck, she won her second bronze medal.

== Rankings ==
=== World Cup ===
Discipline	2022	2023	2024	2025	2026
Boulder	22	14	8	5	9

=== World Championships ===
Discipline	Seoul 2025
Boulder	31

=== Japan Cup ===
Discipline	2016	2020	2021	2022	2023	2024	2025	2026
Boulder	37	6	11	7	6	3	8	6
