= Yoshiyuki Ogata =

Japanese rock climber (born 1998)

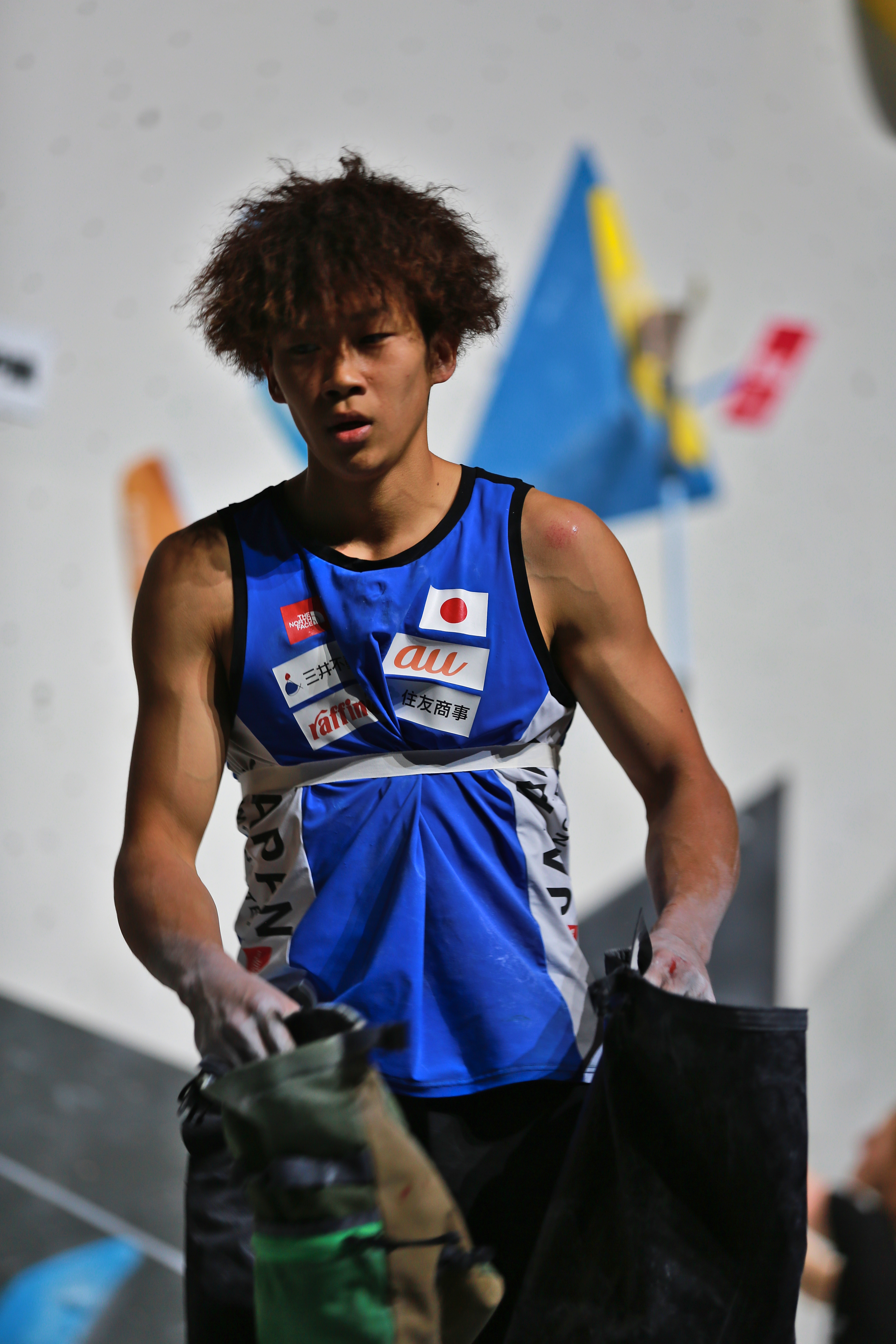
- Ogata in 2018

Personal information
- Nationality: Japanese
- Born: February 4, 1998 (age 28) Kurume, Japan
- Occupations: Professional sport climber and boulderer
- Height: 171 cm (5 ft 7 in)
- Weight: 61 kg (134 lb)

Climbing career
- Type of climber: Competition climbing; Bouldering
- Highest grade: Redpoint: 8b (5.13d); Bouldering: V13 (8B)
- Known for: Winner of multiple World Cup medals
Medal record
Men's competition climbing
Event	1st	2nd	3rd
World Cup	3	3	4
World Games	1	0	1
World Cup (Season)
Third place	2019	Bouldering
Winner	2021	Bouldering
Winner	2022	Bouldering
World Cup
Gold medal – first place	Salt Lake 2022	Bouldering
Gold medal – first place	Innsbruck 2021	Bouldering
Gold medal – first place	Vail 2019	Bouldering
Silver medal – second place	Morioka 2022	Combined
Silver medal – second place	Salt Lake 2022	Bouldering
Silver medal – second place	Meiringen 2022	Bouldering
Silver medal – second place	Meiringen 2021	Bouldering
Bronze medal – third place	Brixen 2023	Bouldering
Bronze medal – third place	Innsbruck 2022	Bouldering
Bronze medal – third place	Seoul 2022	Bouldering
Bronze medal – third place	Moscow 2019	Bouldering
Bronze medal – third place	Vail 2017	Bouldering
Asian Championships
Gold medal – first place	2016	Bouldering
Silver medal – second place	2017	Bouldering
Bronze medal – third place	2017	Lead
Silver medal – second place	2019	Combined
Silver medal – second place	2022	Bouldering
Silver medal – second place	2022	Lead
Asian Cup (Season)
Winner	2017	Lead
World Games
Gold medal – first place	2017 Wrocław	Bouldering
Bronze medal – third place	2022 Birmingham	Bouldering

Yoshiyuki Ogata (緒方 良行 Ogata Yoshiyuki, born February 4, 1998) is a Japanese professional competition climber and boulderer. He has won multiple medals in competition bouldering at IFSC Climbing World Cup events, including gold medals at Vail in 2019 and at Innsbruck in 2021. Ogata won the overall IFSC Men's Bouldering title for the 2021 and 2022 seasons and finished third overall in 2019.

== Early life and youth competitions ==
Born in Kurume, Fukuoka prefecture, Ogata began bouldering at age 10 after he saw the sport on television. At age 17, he won the lead competition at the 2015 Japan Youth National Championships, as well as the bouldering competitions at the IFSC Climbing World Youth Championships and the IFSC Climbing Asian Youth Championships in the Male Youth A (age 15–17) category. He won another bouldering gold medal as well as a combined silver medal at the World Youth Championships in 2017 in the Male Junior (age 17 to 19) category.

== Competition climbing ==
Ogata began competing in senior competitions at age 16, entering the Chongqing and Laval World Cups in 2014. At age 18, he won the gold medal in men's bouldering event at the 2016 IFSC Climbing Asian Championships, and collected a silver in bouldering and bronze in lead the following year. Ogata won gold at the men's bouldering event at the 2017 World Games, where he qualified as the 2016 Asian champion. He made his first World Cup podium finish with a bronze medal at the Vail World Cup in 2017. Ogata won his first World Cup event in bouldering at Vail in 2019 and won his second at Innsbruck in 2021. At the 2021 IFSC Climbing World Championships, Ogata advanced to the men's final in lead, finishing 7th overall. In 2022, Ogata made the finals in all six IFSC World Cup bouldering events, taking home one gold, two silver, and two bronze medals, and winning the overall title.

== Away from climber and boulderer ==
He joined SASUKE 39 at 28 December 2021.He has given number 52. He was member of Akko Gundan (Red Tigers). He failed Stage 1 at Dragon Glider.

== Rankings ==
=== IFSC Climbing World Cup ===
Discipline	2014	2015	2016	2017	2018	2019	2020	2021	2022	2023	2024
Lead	-	-	-	20	27	-	-	-	9	7	16
Bouldering	83	40	18	8	8	3	-	1	1	6	26

=== Japan Cup ===
Discipline	2014	2015	2016	2017	2018	2019	2020	2021	2022	2023	2024	2025	2026
Bouldering	9	7	10	11	7	8	24	3	17	16	1	26	11

== Climbing World Championships ==
Youth

Discipline	2014 Youth A	2015 Youth A	2016 Juniors	2017 Juniors
Lead	13	7	-	1
Bouldering	-	1	19	1
Speed	-	-	-	-
Combined	-	-	-	2

Adult

Discipline	2018	2019	2021	2023
Lead	31	-	7	27
Bouldering	15	14	8	7
Speed	110	-	-	-
Combined	29	-	-	17

== World Cup podiums ==
=== Bouldering ===
Season	Gold	Silver	Bronze	Total
2017			1	1
2019	1		1	2
2021	1	1		2
2022	1	2	2	5
2023			1	1
Total	3	3	5	11

=== Combined ===
Season	Gold	Silver	Bronze	Total
2022		1		1
Total		1		1

== See also ==
- List of grade milestones in rock climbing
- History of rock climbing
- Rankings of most career IFSC gold medals
