= Ritsu Kayotani =

Japanese climber

Personal information
- Nationality: Japanese
- Born: April 15, 2006 (age 20) Saga, Japan
- Height: 163 cm (5 ft 4 in)

Climbing career
- Type of climber: Bouldering; Competition climbing
- Highest grade: Bouldering: 9A (V17)
Medal record
Men's competition climbing
Representing Japan
Asian Cup
Gold medal – first place	Hong Kong 2025	Boulder
World Youth Championships
Gold medal – first place	Guiyang 2024	Boulder
Gold medal – first place	Seoul 2023	Boulder
Gold medal – first place	Dallas 2022	Boulder

Ritsu Kayotani (通谷 律 Kayotani Ritsu); born April 15, 2006) is a Japanese professional rock climber, specializing in bouldering and competition climbing.

== Youth competitions ==
Kayotani began competing at IFSC Climbing World Youth Championships in 2022. At age 16, he won the boulder title at the 2022 Youth World Championships. He continued to excel in youth competitions – winning consecutive Youth World Championship bouldering titles in 2023 and 2024.

== Climbing career ==
=== Competition climbing ===
Kayotani began competing in senior competitions at age 17, entering the Boulder World Cups in 2023 – consistently making semi-finals. In 2024, he placed sixth at the Boulder World Cup in Innsbruck. In 2025, Kayotani won the gold medal in the men's boulder event at the IFSC Climbing Asian Cup held in Hong Kong.

In January 2026, Kayotani announced that he would step away from competitive climbing to focus on rock climbing.

=== Bouldering ===
At age 14, Kayotani sent his first V15 (8C) boulder - Gekirin in Nagasaki, first ascended by Dai Koyamada.

In May and October 2025, Kayotani sent two V16 (8C+) boulders: Nexus in Shiobara and Floatin in Mizugaki.

== Rankings ==
=== World Cup ===
Discipline	2023	2024
Boulder	12	8

=== World Youth Championships ===
Discipline	2022 Youth A	2023 Youth A	2024 Junior
Boulder	1	1	1
Lead	4	-	-

== Notable ascents ==
=== Boulder problems ===
9A (V17):

- No One Mourns The Wicked – Thunder Ridge (USA) – October 2026 – Fifth Ascent.

8C+ (V16):

- Nayuta (那由多) – Gero (JPN) – September 2026 – Third ascent.
- Tanpopo – Shiobara (JPN) – 17 March 2026 – First ascent.
- Floatin – Mizugaki (JPN) – October 2025 – Seventh ascent.
- Nexus – Shiobara (JPN) – May 2025 – Third ascent.

8C (V15):

- Defying Gravity - South Platte (USA) - October 2026.
- Flux – Gero (JPN) – May 2026 – Third ascent.
- Loca – Shiobara (JPN) – May 2026 – Third ascent.
- Mandoragora – Shiobara (JPN) – April 2026.
- Sleepwalker - Black Velvet Canyon (USA) – February 2026
- Gargantua – Mount Hiei (JPN) – December 2025 – Second ascent.
- Kawaki no umi – Kumamoto (JPN) – December 2025.
- Tokoyo – Mount Kasagi (JPN) – November 2025 – Fourth ascent.
- Dendrobium – Shiobara (JPN) – November 2025 – Second ascent.
- Hydrangea – Shiobara (JPN) – April 2025 – Fifth ascent.
- Vanitas – Hōrai (JPN) - March 2025.
- Horizon – Mount Hiei (JPN) – March 2022 – Fifth ascent.
- Gekirin – Nagasaki (JPN) – February 2021 – Third ascent.

8B+ (V14):

- Ymir – Shiobara (JPN) – February 2026.
- Kage – Shikoku (JPN) – December 2025.
- Hōtō – Mizugaki (JPN) – December 2025.
- Emotion – Mount Kasagi (JPN) – November 2025.
- Gakidō – Chigobutai (JPN) – September 2025.
- Phenomena - Hinokage (JPN) - December 2024 - Third ascent.
- Bailout – Hinokage (JPN) – December 2024 – Second ascent.
- Revival – Nagasaki (JPN) – April 2023 – FA.
