= Mao Nakamura =

Japanese rock climber (born 2000)

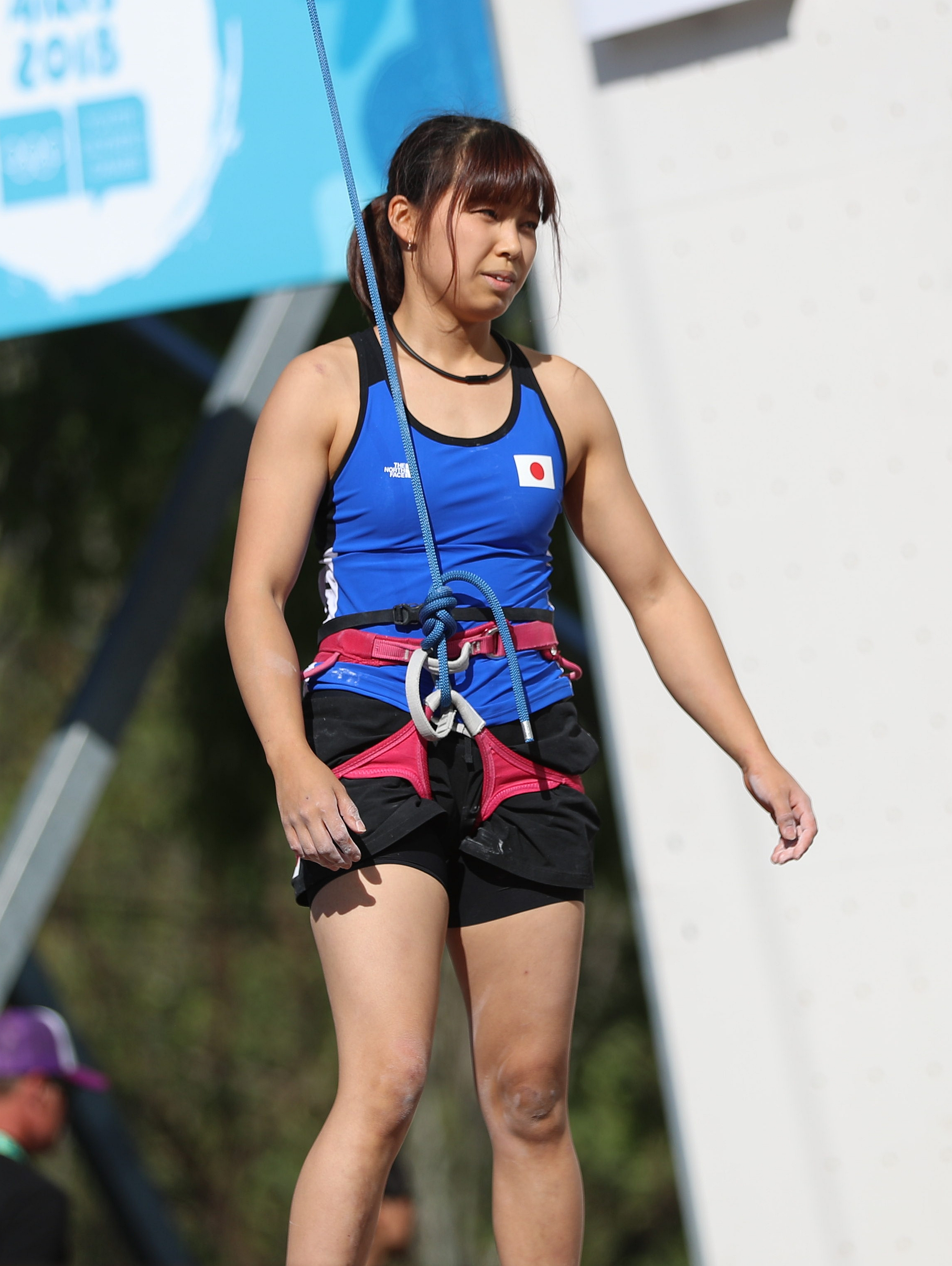
- Nakamura at the 2018 Youth Summer Olympics

Personal information
- Nationality: Japanese
- Born: March 2, 2000 (age 26) Japan

Climbing career
- Type of climber: Competition climbing; Sport climbing; Bouldering
Medal record
Women's competition climbing
Representing Japan
World Cup (Overall)
Second place	2025	Bouldering
Third place	2024	Bouldering
World Cup
Gold medal – first place	Salt Lake City 2025	Bouldering
Bronze medal – third place	Salt Lake City 2026	Bouldering

Mao Nakamura (/ˈmɑːoʊˌnɑːkəˈmʊərə/ MAH-oh-NAH-kuh-MOOR-uh; 中村 真緒 (Nakamura Mao); born March 2, 2000) is a Japanese professional rock climber. She competes in international competition climbing, including the IFSC Climbing World Cup, Asian Championships, and youth-level IFSC events. Representing Japan, Nakamura specializes in bouldering and lead climbing, and is a member of the Japanese national climbing team. She rose to international attention with strong performances on the World Cup circuit, notably placing 1st in bouldering at the 2025 IFSC World Cup in Salt Lake City, her career-best senior result to date. Nakamura has also earned podiums in youth competitions, including multiple gold medals at the Asian Youth Championships and finalist placements at the IFSC Youth World Championships.

== Early life and education ==
Mao Nakamura was born on March 2, 2000, in Japan. She first became interested in climbing in elementary school—after joining a family outing that led her to a bouldering gym in 6th grade, she quickly fell in love with the sport and began training intensively. She experimented with ballet, tennis, and piano, but by middle school, climbing had become her clear passion. Describing herself as highly competitive, she began winning domestic youth competitions by high school and was selected to Japan’s national training programs.

Nakamura attended Aoyama Gakuin University, majoring in Cultural Policy. While excelling academically, she maintained a rigorous training schedule—climbing five days a week (about 4–5 hours per session), complemented by morning runs and weekly fitness sessions—and expressed a strong desire to support future generations through climbing outreach.

== Climbing career ==
Mao Nakamura made her first international appearance at the 2018 Summer Youth Olympics in Buenos Aires, finishing sixth in the girls’ combined event. She went on to earn three silver medals in Lead, Speed, and Boulder at the 2019 Asian Youth Championships in Bengaluru, and was a finalist across multiple disciplines—Lead (12th), Combined (8th), Boulder (24th), and Speed (18th)—at the IFSC Youth World Championships in Arco, Italy that same year. In 2021, she entered the senior IFSC World Cup circuit full-time, posting strong Boulder results in Salt Lake City (10th) and Innsbruck (10th), and ultimately finishing 10th overall in the 2021 Boulder World Cup standings.

Nakamura continued to build momentum in 2022, achieving a Bronze in Boulder at the World Games in Birmingham and a Silver at the FISU University Championships in Innsbruck. Her 2024 season saw consistent top-10 finishes in Boulder—including 6th in Salt Lake City and Prague, 4th in Innsbruck and at the NEOM Masters, 10th in Seoul, and 4th at the IFSC Asian Championships in Tai’an. In 2025, Nakamura earned her first senior World Cup gold, becoming the only finalist to top three boulders in Salt Lake City and securing the victory ahead of Zélia Avezou and Annie Sanders. She also reached finals in Curitiba and Keqiao, placing fourth in each

=== 2021 World Cup season ===
In 2021, she debuted on the senior IFSC circuit, making two Boulder World Cup appearances in Salt Lake City (placing 14th in the first event and 10th in the second) and Innsbruck (10th), and finished 10th overall in the 2021 Boulder World Cup standings—ranking among Japan’s top scorers that season.

=== 2022 World Cup season ===
The year 2022 marked Nakamura’s expansion into multi-discipline competition. She captured bronze in Boulder at the World Games in Birmingham and silver at the FISU University Championships in Innsbruck.

=== 2024 World Cup season ===
In 2024, Nakamura secured multiple World Cup top‑10 finishes, including 6th in Boulder at Salt Lake City and Prague, 4th in Innsbruck, and 10th in Seoul. She also placed 4th in Boulder at the IFSC Asian Championships in Tai’an and at the NEOM IFSC Masters event.

=== 2025 World Cup season ===
Nakamura’s breakthrough came in 2025 when she won her first senior IFSC World Cup Boulder event in Salt Lake City—the only climber to top three finals boulders—earning gold ahead of Zélia Avezou and Annie Sanders. She also reached finals in Curitiba and Keqiao, placing fourth in both events.

== World Cup results ==
=== Asian Youth Championship Titles ===
Year	Event	Location	Discipline	Medal
2019	Asian Youth Championships – Bengaluru	Bengaluru, India	Lead	Silver 🥈
2019	Asian Youth Championships – Bengaluru	Bengaluru, India	Speed	Silver 🥈
2019	Asian Youth Championships – Bengaluru	Bengaluru, India	Bouldering	Silver 🥈
2018	Asian Youth Championships – Chongqing	Chongqing, China	Bouldering	Gold 🥇
2017	Asian Youth Championships – Singapore	Singapore	Bouldering	Gold 🥇
2015	Asian Youth Championships – Putrajaya	Putrajaya, Malaysia	Bouldering	Gold 🥇

=== IFSC World Cup Podiums ===
Year	Event	City	Discipline	Rank
2025	IFSC Climbing World Cup – Salt Lake City	Salt Lake City, USA	Bouldering	1st 🥇

=== Full IFSC World Cup Results ===
Year	Event	City	Date	Discipline	Rank
2025	IFSC World Cup	Innsbruck, AUT	2025-06-25	Boulder	5
2025	IFSC World Cup	Bern, SUI	2025-06-13	Boulder	5
2025	IFSC World Cup	Prague, CZE	2025-06-06	Boulder	19
2025	IFSC World Cup	Salt Lake City, USA	2025-05-24	Boulder	1
2025	IFSC World Cup	Curitiba, BRA	2025-05-19	Boulder	4
2025	IFSC World Cup	Keqiao, CHN	2025-04-20	Boulder	4
2024	NEOM IFSC Masters	Neom	2024-11-13	Boulder	4
2024	IFSC Asian Championships	Tai'an	2024-10-14	Boulder	4
2024	IFSC World Cup	Seoul	2024-10-06	Lead	30
2024	IFSC World Cup	Seoul	2024-10-06	Boulder	10
2024	IFSC World Cup	Prague	2024-09-22	Boulder	6
2024	IFSC World Cup	Briançon	2024-07-19	Lead	30
2024	IFSC World Cup	Chamonix	2024-07-14	Lead	21
2024	IFSC World Cup	Innsbruck	2024-06-30	Boulder	4
2024	IFSC World Cup	Salt Lake City	2024-05-06	Boulder	6
2024	IFSC World Cup	Keqiao	2024-04-10	Boulder	11
2022	World Games	Birmingham, USA	2022-07-17	Boulder	3
2022	FISU University Championships	Innsbruck	2022-06-17	Boulder	2
2021	IFSC World Championships	Moscow	2021-09-21	Boulder	14
2021	IFSC World Cup	Innsbruck	2021-06-26	Boulder	10
2021	IFSC World Cup	Salt Lake City	2021-05-31	Boulder	14
2021	IFSC World Cup	Salt Lake City	2021-05-23	Boulder	10
2019	IFSC World Cup	Vail	2019-06-08	Boulder	6
2019	IFSC World Cup	Wujiang	2019-05-05	Boulder	12
2019	IFSC World Cup	Wujiang	2019-05-05	Speed	48
2019	IFSC World Cup	Chongqing	2019-04-28	Boulder	16
2019	IFSC World Cup	Chongqing	2019-04-28	Speed	50
2019	IFSC World Cup	Moscow	2019-04-14	Boulder	23
2019	IFSC World Cup	Moscow	2019-04-14	Speed	60
2019	IFSC World Cup	Meiringen	2019-04-06	Boulder	51
2018	IFSC World Cup	Munich	2018-08-18	Boulder	10
2018	IFSC World Cup	Vail	2018-06-09	Boulder	13
2018	IFSC World Cup	Hachioji	2018-06-03	Boulder	35
2018	IFSC World Cup	Chongqing	2018-05-06	Boulder	20
2018	IFSC World Cup	Chongqing	2018-05-06	Speed	36
2018	IFSC World Cup	Moscow	2018-04-22	Boulder	31
2018	IFSC World Cup	Meiringen	2018-04-14	Boulder	15
2017	IFSC World Cup	Hachioji	2017-05-07	Boulder	43
2016	IFSC World Cup	Kazo	2016-04-24	Boulder	33
