= 2026 World Climbing Asia Youth Championship =

Competition climbing event

World Climbing Asia Youth Championship Guiyang 2026
- Location: Guiyang, China
- Date: 21 - 25 August 2026

The 2026 World Climbing Asia Youth Championship, officially titled the World Climbing Asia Youth Championship Guiyang 2026, was held in Guiyang, China, from 21 to 25 August 2026. The continental youth championship featured 213 athletes representing 16 countries and regions, competing in boulder, lead, speed and speed relay in the U17 and U19 age categories.

China topped the medal table with 10 gold, nine silver and three bronze medals, followed by Japan, South Korea, Indonesia and Kazakhstan. China won all eight gold medals available across the individual speed and speed relay events.

== Background ==
Guiyang was selected to host the Asian Youth Climbing Championships for a second consecutive year, following the 2025 edition. The championship is organized by World Climbing Asia, with the Chinese Mountaineering Association, Guizhou Provincial Sports Bureau and Guiyang municipal government among the host organizers. The competition was held at the Guizhou Caihu International Climbing Center and attracted 213 athletes representing 16 countries and regions. Japan entered the largest delegation with 38 athletes, followed by host China with 37 and South Korea with 26, while Indonesia entered 13 athletes. According to China Daily, the event is classified by World Climbing Asia as an A-level continental competition and represents the highest level of youth competition climbing in Asia.

The 2026 championship was the first edition of the Asian Youth Championship to include speed relay. Men's and women's relay events were contested in both the U17 and U19 categories. The addition followed the introduction of the revised two-athlete speed relay format into World Climbing competition, including the World Climbing Series in 2026.

This 2026 championship was also the first edition held under the World Climbing Asia Youth Championship name, following the international federation's change in competition branding.

== Medal table ==
* Host nation (China)

Rank	Nation	Gold	Silver	Bronze	Total
1	China*	10	10	3	23
2	Japan	3	4	5	12
3	South Korea	2	2	3	7
4	Indonesia	1	0	3	4
5	Kazakhstan	0	0	2	2
Totals (5 entries)		16	16	16	48

== Medalists ==
=== Male ===
Event	Gold	Silver	Bronze
Under 19
Lead	Taesung Park; South Korea	Jungbin Choi; South Korea	Hareru Nagamori; Japan
Speed	Zhao Yicheng; China	Ruifeng Wang; China	Kecheng Hou; China
Speed Relay	China; Kecheng Hou; Ruifeng Wang	South Korea; Sangwon Choi; Sanghyun An	Indonesia; Amirul Rizqi Febriyansah; Haddan Malik Baqmuhyibar
Bouldering	Beomjin Park; South Korea	Jihoo Lee; South Korea	Hareru Nagamori; Japan
Under 17
Lead	Kazuki Nakata; Japan	Haku Ishida; Japan	Taketo Saiki; Japan
Speed	Mingyi Zhou; China	Peilin Wang; China	Laksamana Krido Swarna Bumi; Indonesia
Speed Relay	China; Chaohua Wang; Mingyi Zhou	China; Zerui Li; Peilin Wang	Kazakhstan; Vadim Sagintayev; David Kononov
Bouldering	Ardana Cikal Damarwulan; Indonesia	Takumi Nakayama; Japan	Jungyoon Choi; South Korea

=== Female ===
Event	Gold	Silver	Bronze
Under 19
Lead	Kohana Mugishima; Japan	Karin Yokomichi; Japan	Shiori Murasugi; Japan
Speed	Yuting Wang; China	Chunyouxuan Wang; China	Xinyi Huang; China
Speed Relay	China; Yuting Wang; Yumei Bai	China; Xinyi Huang; Chunyouxuan Wang	Kazakhstan; Arina Novitskaya; Alina Lvova
Bouldering	Akane Matsuura; Japan	Iroha Yamazaki; Japan	Nagi Karino; Japan
Under 17
Lead	Yijing Lu; China	Meini Li; China	Ha Been Kim; South Korea
Speed	Nuo Chen; China	Zijiao Yang; China	Yunseo Cho; South Korea
Speed Relay	China; Nuo Chen; Zijiao Yang	China; Youcheng Ge; Mengyao Yu	Indonesia; Naura Jasmine Rayya Syafiqa; Keyzia Queenme Candley Riwoe
Bouldering	Youtian Tan; China	Meini Li; China	Yijing Lu; China
