= Indonesia at the 2026 Asian Beach Games =

- IOC code: INA
- NOC: Indonesian Olympic Committee
- Website: nocindonesia.id

in Sanya, China 22–30 April 2026
- Competitors: 22 in 3 sports
- Flag bearer: Bintang Akbar (beach volleyball)
- Medals Ranked 11th: Gold 1 Silver 2 Bronze 0 Total 3

Asian Beach Games appearances
- 2008; 2010; 2012; 2014; 2016; 2026

Indonesia competed in the 2026 Asian Beach Games in Sanya, Hainan, China from 22 to 30 April 2026. This marks the return of the Asian Beach Games, ten years since the 2016 edition in Da Nang, Vietnam. The delegation have 22 athletes in 3 sports.

Beach volleyball player Bintang Akbar was the flagbearer for the opening ceremony. Speed climber Amanda Narda Mutia was the flagbearer for the closing ceremony.

== Competitors ==
The following is the list of the number of competitors participating at the Games per sport/discipline.

| Sport | Men | Women | Total |
|---|---|---|---|
| 3x3 basketball | 4 | 4 | 8 |
| Beach volleyball | 4 | 2 | 6 |
| Sport climbing | 4 | 4 | 8 |
| Total | 12 | 10 | 22 |

== Medalists ==
| Medal | Name | Sport | Event | Date |
|---|---|---|---|---|
| Gold | Desak Made Rita Kusuma Dewi; Kadek Adi Asih | Sport climbing | Women's speed relay | 29 April |
| Silver | Antasyafi Robby Al Hilmi | Sport climbing | Men's speed individual | 28 April |
| Silver | Antasyafi Robby Al Hilmi; Raharjati Nursamsa | Sport climbing | Men's speed relay | 29 April |

== 3x3 basketball ==
Indonesia entered both its men's and women's 3x3 basketball teams.

Summary

| Event | Group Stage | | | | Qualifiers | Quarterfinals | Semifinals | Final / BM | |
| Event | Opposition Score | Opposition Score | Opposition Score | Rank | Opposition Score | Opposition Score | Opposition Score | Opposition Score | Rank |
|---|---|---|---|---|---|---|---|---|---|
| Men's team | Mongolia; L 15–12 | Sri Lanka; L 21–12 | Malaysia; L 22–11 | 4 | Did not advance | | | | |
| Women's team | Philippines; L 15–11 | Kyrgyzstan; W 16–11 | Macau; W 17–12 | 2 q | Chinese Taipei; L 10–21 | Did not advance | | | |

=== Men's tournament ===
Team roster

- Nickson Damara Gosal
- Ebrahim Lopez Enguio
- Jonathan Patrick Alex
- Halmaherrano Aprianto Lolaru Hady

Preliminary rounds – Group B

| Pos | Team | Pld | W | L | PF | PA | PR | Qualification |
|---|---|---|---|---|---|---|---|---|
| 1 | Malaysia | 3 | 3 | 0 | 62 | 35 | 1.771 | Quarterfinals |
| 2 | Mongolia | 3 | 2 | 1 | 49 | 42 | 1.167 | Play-ins |
| 3 | Sri Lanka | 3 | 1 | 2 | 44 | 55 | 0.800 | Play-ins |
| 4 | Indonesia | 3 | 0 | 3 | 35 | 58 | 0.603 | |

Source: OCA

26 April
11:25

Report

| Mongolia | 15–12 | Indonesia |
| Pts: Bayarbaatar 5 | | Pts: Enguio 6 |

Sanya Sports Centre Gymnasium, Sanya

26 April
13:05

Report

| Indonesia | 12–21 | Sri Lanka |
| Pts: Lolaru Hady 7 | | Pts: Mendis 9 |

Sanya Sports Centre Gymnasium, Sanya

27 April
17:10

Report

| Indonesia | 11–22 | Malaysia |
| Pts: Lolaru Hady 6 | | Pts: Chong 10 |

Sanya Sports Centre Gymnasium, Sanya

=== Women's tournament ===
Team roster

- Dewa Ayu Made Sriartha Kusuma
- Angelica Jennifer Candra
- Diva Intan Nur Fadillah
- Berlian Yesi Triutari

Preliminary rounds – Group C

| Pos | Team | Pld | W | L | PF | PA | PR | Qualification |
|---|---|---|---|---|---|---|---|---|
| 1 | Philippines | 3 | 3 | 0 | 57 | 35 | 1.629 | Quarterfinals |
| 2 | Indonesia | 3 | 2 | 1 | 44 | 38 | 1.158 | Play-ins |
| 3 | Macau | 3 | 1 | 2 | 35 | 49 | 0.714 | Play-ins |
| 4 | Kyrgyzstan | 3 | 0 | 3 | 37 | 51 | 0.725 | |

Source: OCA

25 April
16:20

Report

| Philippines | 15–11 | Indonesia |
| Pts: Cacho 5 | | Pts: Fadillah 6 |

Sanya Sports Centre Gymnasium, Sanya

25 April
18:25

Report

| Indonesia | 16–11 | Kyrgyzstan |
| Pts: Kusuma, Candra 7 | | Pts: Mazikina 7 |

Sanya Sports Centre Gymnasium, Sanya

27 April
12:40

Report

| Indonesia | 17–12 | Macau |
| Pts: Fadillah 8 | | Pts: Chan 5 |

Sanya Sports Centre Gymnasium, Sanya

Play-ins

28 April
11:00

Report

| Indonesia | 10–21 | Chinese Taipei |
| Pts: Kusuma 4 | | Pts: Chiu 8 |

Sanya Sports Centre Gymnasium, Sanya

== Beach volleyball ==
| Athlete | Event | Preliminary round | | | | | Round of 16 | Quarterfinals | Semifinal | Final | | |
| Athlete | Event | Opposition Score | Opposition Score | Opposition Score | Opposition Score | Rank | Opposition Score | Opposition Score | Opposition Score | Opposition Score | Opposition Score | Rank |
|---|---|---|---|---|---|---|---|---|---|---|---|---|
| Bintang Akbar; Sofyan Rachman Effendi | Men | Savio Velante / Fernandes Xavier (TLS); W 2-0 | Ahmed / Almawid (PLE); W 2-0 | Alkhawaher / Mahfouz (KSA); W 2-0 | —N/a | 1 Q | Fukushima / Malki (JPN); W 2-0 | Muadpha / Muneekul (THA); L 1-2 | Did not advance | | | |
| Fairuz Bayhaqly; Imam Ahmad Faisal | Men | Abi Karam / El Chabib (LBN); L 0-2 | Muadpha / Muneekul (THA); L 0-2 | Oh / Bae (KOR); W 2-0 | —N/a | 3 | Did not advance | | | | | |
| Nur Atika; Josephine Selvina | Women | Mariyam / Ishag (MDV); W 2–0 | Khatun / Akter (BAN); W 2-0 | Mungkhon / Seehawong (THA); L 0-2 | —N/a | 2 Q | Dong / Jiang (CHN); L 0-2 | Did not advance | | | | |

== Sport climbing ==
Individual

| Athlete | Event | Qualification | | | | Round of 16 | Quarterfinals | Semifinals | Final / BM | |
| Athlete | Event | Lane A | Lane B | Time | Rank | Opposition Time | Opposition Time | Opposition Time | Opposition Time | Rank |
|---|---|---|---|---|---|---|---|---|---|---|
| Raharjati Nursamsa | Men | 4.88 | 4.83 | 4.83 | 4 Q | Alipour (IRI); W 5.15-FALL | Chu (CHN); L 5.20-6.57 | Did not advance | | |
| Aditya Tri Syahria | Men | 4.85 | 5.03 | 4.85 | 5 Q | Chu (CHN); L 4.94-4.97 | Did not advance | | | |
| Antasyafi Robby Al Hilmi | Men | 4.94 | 6.68 | 4.94 | 7 Q | Fujino (JPN); W 4.89-FALL | Omasa (JPN); W 5.49-4.98 | Khaibullin (KAZ); W 4.81-FALL | Zhao (CHN); L 0-0(FS) | 2nd place, silver medalist(s) |
| Ramaski Aswin Kristanto | Men | 5.182 | 6.819 | 5.182 | 14 Q | Long (CHN); L FALL-4.92 | Did not advance | | | |
| Desak Made Rita Kusuma Dewi | Women | 6.27 | 6.35 | 6.27 | 1 Q | Takeuchi (JPN); W 6.63-7.92 | Qin (CHN); L FALL-11.96 | Did not advance | | |
| Kadek Adi Asih | Women | 6.83 | 6.60 | 6.60 | 4 Q | Ulzhabayeva (KAZ); W 6.75-7.57 | Deng (CHN); L 6.58-6.55 | Did not advance | | |
| Amanda Narda Mutia | Women | 7.09 | 6.95 | 6.95 | 9 Q | Qin (CHN); L 7.14-6.80 | Did not advance | | | |
| Puja Lestari | Women | 8.18 | 7.62 | 7.62 | 14 Q | Jeong (KOR); W 0-0(FS) | Zhang (CHN); L 7.44-6.68 | Did not advance | | |

Relay

| Athlete | Event | Qualification | | | | Round of 16 | Quarterfinals | Semifinals | Final / BM | |
| Athlete | Event | Lane A&B | Lane C&D | Time | Rank | Opposition Time | Opposition Time | Opposition Time | Opposition Time | Rank |
|---|---|---|---|---|---|---|---|---|---|---|
| Raharjati Nursamsa; Antasyafi Robby Al Hilmi | Men | 10.26 | 10.14 | 10.14 | 1 Q | Aplatchikov / Zhidkov (KGZ); W 12.54-13.90 | Wu / Chu (CHN); W 11.25-FS | Ra. Khaibullin / Ri. Khaibullin (KAZ); W 10.34-12.12 | Zhao / Long (CHN); L 9.80-9.75 | 2nd place, silver medalist(s) |
| Aditya Tri Syahria; Ramaski Aswin Kristanto | Men | 10.89 | 15.95 | 10.89 | 5 Q | Yasukawa / Omasa (JPN); W 10.65-13.55 | Ra. Khaibullin / Ri. Khaibullin (KAZ); L 10.89-13.51 | Did not advance | | |
| Amanda Narda Mutia; Puja Lestari | Women | 15.20 | 15.46 | 15.20 | 6 Q | —N/a | Jeong / Sung (KOR); L 13.36-14.98 | Did not advance | | |
| Kadek Adi Asih; Desak Made Rita Kusuma Dewi | Women | 14.45 | 14.27 | 14.27 | 4 Q | —N/a | Hayashi / Koyamatsu (JPN); W 14.14-18.41 | Deng / Zhou (CHN); W 13.174-13.178 | Jeong / Sung (KOR); W 13.76-16.50 | 1st place, gold medalist(s) |
