= Samuel Richard =

French rock climber

Personal information
- Nationality: France
- Born: September 6, 2007 (age 18) Valence, France
- Height: 169 cm (5 ft 7 in)

Climbing career
- Type of climber: Sport climbing; Bouldering; Competition climbing; Deep-water soloing
- Highest grade: Bouldering: 9A (V17)
Medal record
Men's competition climbing
Representing France
World Cup
Bronze medal – third place	Madrid 2026	Boulder
Bronze medal – third place	Prague 2025	Boulder
European Championships
Bronze medal – third place	Barcelona 2026	Boulder
World Youth Championships
Silver medal – second place	Helsinki 2025	Boulder

Samuel Richard is a French rock climber who specialises in competition bouldering.

== Climbing career ==
=== Competition climbing ===
In his first Boulder World Cup final, he won the bronze medal at the 2025 Prague World Cup behind Sorato Anraku and compatriot Mejdi Schalck.

At the 2025 World Youth Championships in Helsinki, Richard claimed silver in boulder.

=== Rock climbing ===
On October 10, 2025, Richard redpointed Es Pontàs in Mallorca, Spain – the world's first-ever deep water solo graded at 9a+ (5.15a).

In October 2025, Richard sent Simon Lorenzi's Soudain Seul V17 (9A) boulder in Fontainebleau after 27 sessions.

== Rankings ==
=== World Championships ===
Discipline	Seoul 2025
Boulder	15

=== World Youth Championships ===
Discipline	2022 Youth B	2023 Youth A	2025 U19
Boulder	15	6	2

=== European Youth Championships ===
Discipline	2022 Youth B	2023 Youth A	2024 Youth A	2025 U19
Boulder	2	5	1	1

== Notable ascents ==
=== Boulder problems ===
9A (V17):

- Soudain Seul - Fontainebleau (FRA) - 2025

8C (V15):

- Power of now direct - Magic Wood (SUI) - 2024
- The Big Island - Fontainebleau (FRA) - 2023

=== Redpointed routes ===
9a+ (5.15a):

- Es Pontàs - Mallorca (ESP) - 2025
