= Natsumi Oda =

Japanese competition climber (born 2008)

Personal information
- Nationality: Japanese
- Born: March 23, 2008 (age 18) Osaka, Japan
- Height: 164 cm (5 ft 5 in)

Climbing career
- Type of climber: Competition lead climbing
Medal record
Women's competition climbing
Representing Japan
Asian Championships
Bronze medal – third place	Tai'an 2024	Lead
Bronze medal – third place	Meishan 2026	Lead

Natsumi Oda (小田 菜摘 Oda Natsumi; born March 23, 2008) is a Japanese competition climber who specializes in competition lead climbing.

Oda started climbing on the IFSC Climbing World Cup circuit in 2024, notably making finals and placing 7th in her debut World Cup in Wujiang. In July 2024, she placed 7th in the Briançon World Cup.

Oda claimed the bronze medal in Lead at the 2024 Asian Championships in Tai'an.

In 2025, Oda reached the semifinal stage in 3 of the 6 Lead World Cups. She advanced to the Lead finals at the 2025 Youth World Championships, placing 6th.

Her 2026 season began with a podium place in the Lead discipline at the Asian Championships, taking bronze behind compatriot Ai Mori and Seo Chae-hyun.

== Rankings ==
=== World Cup ===
Discipline	2024	2025	2026
Lead	13	28	26

=== World Championships ===
Discipline	Seoul 2025
Lead	36

=== World Youth Championships ===
Discipline	2022 Youth B	2023 Youth B	2024 Youth A	2025 U19	2026 U19
Lead	17	1	-	6	3
Bouldering	2	3	4	-	-

=== Asian Championships ===
Discipline	2024	2026
Lead	3	3

=== Japan Cup ===
Discipline	2024	2025	2026
Lead	3	3	4

=== Japan Youth Championships ===
Discipline	2020	2022	2023	2024	2025	2026
Lead	1	1	1	1	1	1
Bouldering	-	3	2	2	4	
