= 2025 IFSC Asian Youth Championships =

Competition climbing event

- Venue: Guanshanhu Park
- Location: Guiyang, China
- Date: 20 - 24 August 2025

The 2025 IFSC Climbing Asian Youth Championships, was held in Guiyang, China from 20 to 24 August 2025. The competition climbing asian youth championships consisted of lead, speed, and bouldering events, for the under 19 and under 17 age categories.

== Medal table ==
* Host nation (China)

Rank	Nation	Gold	Silver	Bronze	Total
1	Japan	6	8	5	19
2	China*	3	3	3	9
3	South Korea	1	1	2	4
4	Indonesia	1	0	2	3
5	Thailand	1	0	0	1
Totals (5 entries)		12	12	12	36

== Medalists ==
=== Male ===
Event	Gold	Silver	Bronze
Under 19
Lead	Haru Funaki; Japan	Hareru Nagamori; Japan	Hiroto Nishio; Japan
Bouldering	Auswin Aueareechit; Thailand	Hareru Nagamori; Japan	Yuta Kayotani; Japan
Speed	Choi Sangwon; South Korea	Haku Oishi; Japan	Antasyafi Robby Al Hilmi; Indonesia
Under 17
Lead	Taketo Saiki; Japan	Daichi Furukawa; Japan	Lee Hayool; South Korea
Bouldering	Taketo Saiki; Japan	Jung Chanjin; South Korea	Naru Okuhata; Japan
Speed	Haddan Malik Baqmuhyibar; Indonesia	Zhao Yicheng; China	Sota Saito; Japan

=== Female ===
Event	Gold	Silver	Bronze
Under 19
Lead	Chen Xuanzhen; China	Manami Yama; Japan	Moka Mochizuki; Japan
Bouldering	Manami Yama; Japan	Chen Xuanzhen; China	Zhu Xinwen; China
Speed	Meng Shixue; China	Shi Jiaolv; China	Wang Yuting; China
Under 17
Lead	Marin Nakamura; Japan	Arisa Hayashi; Japan	Li Meini; China
Bouldering	Marin Nakamura; Japan	Akane Matsuura; Japan	Kim Gyurin; South Korea
Speed	Wang Chunyouxuan; China	Natsumi Hara; Japan	Jasmine Rayya Syafiqa Naura; Indonesia
