= 2025 in sport climbing =

This article lists the main competition climbing events and their results for 2025. This includes the World Cup, World Championships, International Climbing Series, and Continental Championships.

== World Games ==
- August 7–17: 2025 World Games in (China) Chengdu

== World Championships ==
- July 28 – August 3: 2025 IFSC Climbing World Youth Championships in (Finland) Helsinki
- September 21–28: 2025 IFSC Climbing World Championships in (South Korea) Seoul

== World Cup ==
- April 18–20: CWC #1 in (China) Keqiao
- April 25–27: CWC #2 in (China) Wujiang
- May 2–4: CWC #3 in Indonesia
- May 16–18: CWC #4 in (Brazil) Curitiba
- May 23–25: CWC #5 in (United States) Salt Lake City
- May 31 – June 1: CWC #6 in (United States) Denver
- June 13–15: CWC #7 in (Switzerland) Bern
- June 25–29: CWC #8 in (Austria) Innsbruck
- July 5–6: CWC #9 in (Poland) Kraków
- July 11–13: CWC #10 in (France) Chamonix
- July 18–19: CWC #11 in (Spain) Madrid
- September 5–6: CWC #12 in (Slovenia) Koper
- September 12–13: CWC #13 in (China) Guiyang

== Continental Championships ==
- May 16–18: 2025 IFSC Climbing Youth European Championships (boulder) in (Italy) Curno
- August 20–24: 2025 IFSC Asian Youth Championships in (China) Guiyang
- August 28–31: 2025 IFSC Climbing Youth European Championships (lead & speed) in (Slovakia) Žilina

== Asian Cup ==
=== IFSC-Asia Climbing Asian Cup 2025 ===
- March 8–9: AC #1 in Hong Kong
- August 29–31: AC #2 in (Kazakhstan) Almaty

== European Cup ==
=== IFSC-Europe Climbing European Cup 2025 ===
- March 8–9: EC #1 in (Germany) Munich
- April 5–6: EC #2 in (Italy) Rome
- May 3–4: EC #3 in (Belgium) Brussels
- June 7: EC #4 in (Italy) Mezzolombardo
- June 15: EC #5 in (Poland) Zakopane
- June 21–22: EC #6 in (Italy) Campitello di Fassa
- July 4–5: EC #7 in (Switzerland) Ostermundigen
- July 19: EC #8 in (Portugal) Soure
- August 17: EC #9 in (Austria) St. Pölten
- October 26: EC #10 in (France) Laval
- October 31 - November 2: EC #11 in (France) Toulouse

=== IFSC-Europe Climbing European Youth Cup 2025 ===
- March 22–23: YEC #1 in (Hungary) Budapest
- April 25–27: YEC #2 in (Portugal) Soure
- May 9–11: YEC #3 in (Austria) Graz
- May 24–25: YEC #4 in (Norway) Molde
- June 6: YEC #5 in (Italy) Mezzolombardo
- June 14: YEC #6 in (Poland) Zakopane
- July 19–20: YEC #7 in (Italy) Bologna
- August 16: YEC #8 in (Austria) St. Pölten
- September 13: YEC #9 in (Austria) Imst
- October 25: YEC #10 in (France) Laval
- October 31 - November 2: YEC #11 in (France) Toulouse

== Other international competitions ==
- March 15–16: Studio Bloc Masters 2025 in (Germany) Darmstadt

== National competitions ==
- February 1–2: 2025 Boulder Japan Cup
  - Winners: (Japan) Sorato Anraku (m) / (Japan) Miho Nonaka (w)
- March 1–2: 2025 Lead Japan Cup
  - Winners: (Japan) Sorato Anraku (m) / (Japan) Ai Mori (w)
- February 15–16: 2025 Speed Japan Cup
  - Winners: (Japan) Shuto Fujino (m) / (Japan) Karin Hayashi (w)
