= Asian Youth Climbing Championships =

Climbing competition

The Asian Youth Climbing Championships are the continental championships for youth competition climbing in Asia. The championships include events in boulder, lead, and speed climbing.

Since the 2025 edition, competitors have been divided into the U17 and U19 age categories. Earlier editions used three categories: Youth B or U16, Youth A or U18, and Junior or U20.

The competition was previously held under the International Federation of Sport Climbing branding and was variously known as the IFSC Youth Asian Championships and the IFSC Asian Youth Championships. The 2026 edition is officially titled the World Climbing Asia Youth Championship.

== Championships ==
Edition	Year	Location	Date(s)	Disciplines
	1999	Singapore		L
	2000	(China) Beijing	15 September	
	2001	(Iran) Tehran	25–27 July	
	2002	(Malaysia) Genting Highlands	21 December	L
	2005	Hong Kong	3–4 December	L + S
	2008	(Japan) Yamaguchi	31 October – 1 November	L + S
	2009	(Kazakhstan) Almaty	24–26 July	L + S
	2011	Singapore	28–30 July	L + S
	2012	(Iran) Ramsar	11–13 July	L + S
	2013	(Indonesia) Surabaya	11–14 December	L + S
	2015	(Malaysia) Putrajaya	2–6 December	L + S + B
	2016	(Iran) Tehran	26–30 September	L + S + B
	2017	Singapore	5–9 July	L + S + B
	2018	(China) Chongqing	1–4 November	L + S + B
	2019	(India) Bengaluru	12–15 December	L + S + B
	2023	(China) Chongqing	18–22 October	L + S + B + B&L
	2024	(India) Jamshedpur	14–17 November	L + S + B
	2025	(China) Guiyang	20–24 August	L + S + B
	2026	(China) Guiyang	21–25 August	L + S + B

== Boys results ==
=== Lead ===
==== Juniors ====
Year	Gold	Silver	Bronze
2002	(Iran) Mohammad Jafari Mahmoudabadi	(Hong Kong) Ka-Wai Chu	(Japan) Atsushi Saga
2005	(South Korea) Yongho Jang	(Japan) Yugo Sasaki	(India) Prashant Aallay
2008			
2009	(South Korea) Donggun Lee	(Hong Kong) Bodley Zhang	(Iran) Khosro HASEZADEH
2011	(Japan) Kokoro Fujii	(Japan) Naoto Hakamada	(Iran) Alireza Amirian
2012	(South Korea) Hongil Kim	(Iran) Ahmadreza Solgi	(Japan) Daisuke Ichimiya
2013	(South Korea) Hanwool KIM	(Japan) Tomoaki Takata	(Japan) Toru Kofukuda
2015	(Japan) Hiroto Shimizu	(Japan) Yuki Hada	(Indonesia) Alhadad Jamal
2016	(Japan) Shinichiro Nomura	(Iran) MohammadMehdi Jalili	(Thailand) Thattana Raksachat
2017	(Japan) Meichi Narasaki	(South Korea) Seunghyun Kim	(Japan) Yoshiyuki Ogata
2018	(Japan) Taisei Homma	(China) YuFei Pan	(Japan) Shuta Tanaka
2019	(Japan) Sohta Amagasa	(Japan) Yuta Imaizumi	(Philippines) Gerald Verosil
2023	(Japan) Neo Suzuki	(Japan) Haruki UEMURA	(South Korea) Dohyeon Kim
2024	(Indonesia) Putra Tri Ramadani	(Japan) Kisato Wada	(Japan) Rikuto Inohana

==== Youth A ====
Year	Gold	Silver	Bronze
2002	(Japan) Shinta Ozawa	(Japan) Kazuma Watanabe	(China) LuYuan Cai
2005	(Japan) Sachi Amma	(South Korea) Hyunbin Min	(South Korea) Dae Yeob Kim
2008			
2009	(Iran) Alireza Amirian	(Hong Kong) Ka-chun Yau	(Kazakhstan) Alexander KARKLINAYTIS
2011	(South Korea) Hanwool KIM	(South Korea) Seungwoon Cho	(Japan) Kazune FURUHATA (South Korea) Sungbo Seo
2012	(South Korea) Seungwoon Cho	(South Korea) Hanwool KIM	(Japan) Tomoaki Takata
2013	(Japan) Yuzuru Iida	(South Korea) Jongwon Chon	(Thailand) Winai Ruangrit
2015	(South Korea) Minyoung Lee	(Japan) Kai Harada	(South Korea) Seunghyun Kim
2016	(China) YuFei Pan	(Japan) Kai Harada	(South Korea) Seunghyun Kim
2017	(China) DiChong Huang	(Japan) Shuta Tanaka	(China) YuFei Pan
2018	(Japan) Hidemasa Nishida	(South Korea) Dohyun Lee	(Japan) Ryo OMASA
2019	(Japan) Rei Kawamata	(Japan) Hajime Takeda	(Singapore) Luke Goh Wen Bin
2023	(Japan) Shion Omata	(South Korea) Kibeom Kwon	(Japan) Kisato Wada
2024	(South Korea) Hyunseung Noh	(China) Jinwei Yao	(China) Junzhe Hu

==== Youth B ====
Year	Gold	Silver	Bronze
2002	(South Korea) Jabee Kim	(Iran) Mansour Aghaei	(Malaysia) Wan Malick Aldam Hassan
2005	(South Korea) Donggun Lee	(Japan) Rei Sugimoto	(China) JinYu PAN
2008			
2009	(Japan) Tohru KOFUKUDA	(Kazakhstan) Rishat Khaibullin	(Kazakhstan) Alexander KIM
2011	(Japan) Keiichiro Korenaga	(Japan) Tomoa Narasaki	(Thailand) Thattana Raksachat
2012	(Iran) Sajjad Mostajaboddaveh	(Thailand) Thattana Raksachat	(Kazakhstan) Alexey Panfilov
2013	(Japan) Kaya Otaka	(Japan) Meichi Narasaki	(Japan) Taito Nakagami
2015	(Japan) Shuta Tanaka	(South Korea) Seongmin Eom	(Japan) Keita Dohi
2016	(Japan) Katsura Konishi	(Japan) Naoki Tsurumoto	(South Korea) junsek Choi
2017	(Japan) Hidemasa Nishida	(Indonesia) Ravianto Ramadhan	(Japan) Rei Kawamata
2018	(Japan) Satone YOSHIDA	(Japan) Rei Kawamata	(China) GuoQing NI
2019	(Japan) Satone Yoshida	(Japan) Junta Sekiguchi	(Japan) Haruki UEMURA
2023	(Japan) Hareru Nagamori	(South Korea) Hyunseung Noh	(Japan) Ryota Toda
2024	(Japan) Kazuki Nakata	(China) Zerun Mu	(South Korea) Jungbin Choi

==== U19 ====
Year	Gold	Silver	Bronze
2025	(Japan) Haru Funaki	(Japan) Hareru Nagamori	(Japan) Hiroto Nishio
2026	(South Korea) Taesung Park	(South Korea) Jungbin Choi	(Japan) Hareru Nagamori

==== U17 ====
Year	Gold	Silver	Bronze
2025	(Japan) Taketo Saiki	(Japan) Daichi Furukawa	(South Korea) Lee Hayool
2026	(Japan) Kazuki Nakata	(Japan) Haku Ishida	(Japan) Taketo Saiki

=== Speed ===
==== Juniors ====
Year	Gold	Silver	Bronze
2005	(Indonesia) Sugeng Pamunkgas	(South Korea) Yongho Jang	(Japan) Koichi Shibata
2008			
2009	(Kazakhstan) Anton SHEPOTKO	(Kazakhstan) Kanat Egizbayev	(Iran) Omid SHEIKHBAHAEE
2011	(Indonesia) Afandi Achmad	(Iran) Iman Ehsanifar	(Iran) Mohsen Asgharikhiaban
2012	(China) Guangdong Li	(Iran) Reza Alipourshenazandifar	(China) Ruizhi Chen
2013	(Indonesia) Sabri Sabri	(Hong Kong) Cheung-chi Shoji Chan	(Indonesia) Wahyudi Ilham
2015	(Indonesia) Alhadad Jamal	(Singapore) Tay Zhe Yi Gregory	(Japan) Tomoa Narasaki
2016	(Iran) Ehsan Asrar	(Iran) Mehdi AliPourShenazandi	(China) FengQi WANG
2017	(Iran) Ehsan Asrar	(China) FengQi WANG	(South Korea) JEHEON OH
2018	(Indonesia) Kiromal Katibin	(Iran) Milad Alipour Shenazandifar	(South Korea) Yongsu Lee
2019	(Kazakhstan) Sergey Besmertnykh	(Japan) Sohta Amagasa	(Japan) Yuta Imaizumi
2023	(China) Jinyi Yang	(China) Junxiang Zhang	(South Korea) Hwan Lee
2024	(Japan) Kazuki Tanii	(South Korea) Junwoo Lee	(Indonesia) Aswin Kristanto Ramaski

==== Youth A ====
Year	Gold	Silver	Bronze
2005	(Singapore) Gary Leon Fernandez	(Japan) Toma Kuniya	(Hong Kong) Sin-fai HO
2008			
2009	(Iran) Iman Ehsanifar	(Kazakhstan) Azamat ESIMKHAN	(Kazakhstan) Alexander DEVYATERIKOV
2011	(Indonesia) Sabri Sabri	(Kazakhstan) Yerassyl Murat	(Kazakhstan) Vladimir Arkhipov
2012	(Kazakhstan) Amir Maimuratov	(Kazakhstan) Igor Ryabov	(Kazakhstan) Yerassyl Murat
2013	(Indonesia) Wisnuarta Ngakan Putu	(Thailand) Thattana Raksachat	(Indonesia) Fatchur Roji
2015	(Singapore) Paul Emmanuel Ryan	(Kazakhstan) Alimzhan Myrzabekov	(Iran) Mehdi AliPourShenazandi
2016	(Iran) Milad Alipour Shenazandifar	(Singapore) Paul Emmanuel Ryan	(South Korea) Yongsu Lee
2017	(China) JinXin Li	(Kazakhstan) Andrey Yurin	(Indonesia) Jasmico Pamumade
2018	(China) JinXin Li	(Iran) Porya Karim pour	(India) Sahil Khan
2019	(South Korea) Yongjun Jung	(Kazakhstan) Beknur Altynbekov	(Japan) Hajime Takeda
2023	(China) Shouhong Chu	(China) Zechuan Shi	(China) Zuoxin Li
2024	(Indonesia) Antasyafi Robby Al Hilmi	(Kazakhstan) Damir Toktarov	(Japan) Ginta Uegaki

==== Youth B ====
Year	Gold	Silver	Bronze
2005	(China) JinYu PAN	(Hong Kong) Bodley Zhang	(Indonesia) Muhammad Harfin Natadiningrat
2008			
2009	(Kazakhstan) Anuar EGEUBAYEV	(India) Sujan LIMBU	(KRG) Timur ORMYSHEV
2011	(Indonesia) Alfian Muhammad	(Indonesia) Fatchur Roji	(Thailand) Thattana Raksachat
2012	(Iran) Mehdi AliPourShenazandi	(Iran) Abolfazl Hassanpour	(Kazakhstan) Alisher Murat
2013	(Kazakhstan) Gleb Kogay	(Kazakhstan) Roman Kostyukov	(Kazakhstan) Alimzhan Myrzabekov
2015	(Kazakhstan) Andrey Yurin	(India) Bharath Pereira	(Indonesia) Pamumade Jasmico
2016	(Iran) Porya Karim pour	(Kazakhstan) Beknur Altynbekov	(Iran) Hadi Khoda yari
2017	(India) Chingkheinganba Maibam	(Kazakhstan) Omar Almatov	(Kazakhstan) Beknur Altynbekov
2018	(Japan) Ryoei Nukui	(South Korea) Haram Jeon	(China) RuiHong YAN
2019	(Kyrgyzstan) Alex Ernandes	(China) Yaoyi Yin	(Japan) Haruki UEMURA
2023	(China) Jianxun Xu	(South Korea) Jinyong Jo	(China) Ruifeng Wang
2024	(Indonesia) Haddan Malik Baqmuhyibar	(Japan) Sota Saito	(Japan) Miyuki Ishida

=== Bouldering ===
==== Juniors ====
Year	Gold	Silver	Bronze
2015	(Japan) Tomoa Narasaki	(Japan) Yuki Hada	(Japan) Hiroto Shimizu
2016	(Japan) Shinichiro Nomura	(Japan) Ryohei Kameyama	(Iran) Abolfazl Hassanpour
2017	(Japan) Meichi Narasaki	(Japan) Yoshiyuki Ogata	(Japan) Kai Harada
2018	(China) YuFei Pan	(Japan) Yuta Imaizumi	(Japan) Shuta Tanaka
2019	(Japan) Yuta Imaizumi	(Japan) Sohta Amagasa	(Singapore) Mark Chan Chong Kiat
2023	(Japan) Neo Suzuki	(South Korea) Dohyeon Kim	(China) Yuping Mei
2024	(Japan) Eito Tamiya	(Japan) Kisato Wada	(Indonesia) Putra Tri Ramadani

==== Youth A ====
Year	Gold	Silver	Bronze
2015	(Japan) Yoshiyuki Ogata	(Japan) Kai Harada	(Japan) Taito Nakagami
2016	(Japan) Kai Harada	(China) YuFei Pan	(Singapore) Paul Emmanuel Ryan
2017	(Japan) Keita Dohi	(Japan) Mizuki Tajima	(Japan) Daichi Nakashima
2018	(Japan) Katsura Konishi	(Japan) Hidemasa Nishida	(South Korea) Eojin Kim
2019	(Japan) Rei Kawamata	(Japan) Ao Yurikusa	(Singapore) Luke Goh Wen Bin
2023	(South Korea) Kibeom Kwon	(Japan) Shion Omata	(Japan) Kisato Wada
2024	(Chinese Taipei) Chih-En Fan	(China) Junzhe Hu	(China) Jinwei Yao

==== Youth B ====
Year	Gold	Silver	Bronze
2015	(Japan) Hayato Nakamura	(China) YuFei Pan	(Singapore) Mark Chan Chong Kiat
2016	(Japan) Naoki Tsurumoto	(Japan) Katsura Konishi	(Thailand) Teeraphon Boondech
2017	(Japan) Ryoei Nukui	(Japan) Rei Kawamata	(Japan) Hidemasa Nishida
2018	(Japan) Rei Kawamata	(Japan) Ryoei Nukui	(Japan) Kentaro MAEDA
2019	(Japan) Junta Sekiguchi	(Japan) Satone Yoshida	(Thailand) Nichol Tomas
2023	(Japan) Ryota Toda	(South Korea) Hynuseung Noh	(Japan) Hareru Nagamori
2024	(Japan) Ryusei Hamada	(South Korea) Jungbin Choi	(South Korea) Hayool Lee

==== U19 ====
Year	Gold	Silver	Bronze
2025	(Thailand) Auswin Aueareechit	(Japan) Hareru Nagamori	(Japan) Yuta Kayotani
2026	(South Korea) Beomjin Park	(South Korea) Jihoo Lee	(Japan) Hareru Nagamori

==== U17 ====
Year	Gold	Silver	Bronze
2025	(Japan) Taketo Saiki	(South Korea) Jung Chanjin	(Japan) Naru Okuhata
2026	(Indonesia) Ardana Cikal Damarwulan	(Japan) Takumi Nakayama	(South Korea) Jungyoon Choi

=== Boulder & Lead ===
==== Juniors ====
Year	Gold	Silver	Bronze
2023	(Japan) Neo Suzuki	(China) Yuping Mei	(South Korea) Dohyeon Kim

==== Youth A ====
Year	Gold	Silver	Bronze
2023	(Japan) Shion Omata	(South Korea) Kibeom Kwon	(Japan) Kisato Wada

== Girls results ==
=== Lead ===
==== Juniors ====
Year	Gold	Silver	Bronze
2002	(China) Liu Guiying	(India) M. N. Vathsala	(Japan) Nae Kanatani
2005	(Hong Kong) Cheng Lai Sho	(China) Zhang Dan	(Japan) Asaki Hagiwara
2008	Unknown		
2009	(Kazakhstan) Dina Dudnik	(Kazakhstan) Anastassiya Bryakina	(Iran) Sayeh Tajalizadeh
2011	(Indonesia) Abdul Rohma Syarifah	(Chinese Taipei) Lin Hsiu-ju	(Kazakhstan) Raushan Kenzheakhmetova
2012	(South Korea) Sa Sol	(Chinese Taipei) Lin Hsiu-ju	(Japan) Tsukasa Mizuguchi
2013	(China) Jiang Rong	(Hong Kong) Wu Wing Yu	(Thailand) Pratthana Raksachat
2015	(South Korea) Kim Min-seon	(South Korea) Cho Hai-mi	(South Korea) Yang Ji-won
2016	(China) Wang Xiran	(Iran) Zahra Davari	(Iran) Afsaneh Mirahmadi
2017	(Kazakhstan) Margarita Agambayeva	(South Korea) Kim Seo-hyun	(Nepal) Panchamaya Tamang
2018	(Japan) Kokoro Takata	(Japan) Honoka Moriwaki	(Japan) Shuri Nishida
2019	(Japan) Yuka Higuchi	(Japan) Mao Nakamura	(Iran) Rahil Ramezani
2023	(Japan) Tomona Takao	(Japan) Mashiro Kuzuu	(South Korea) Hanareum Sung
2024	(Iran) Sarina Ghaffari	(Japan) Ai Takeuchi	(Japan) Sana Ogura

==== Youth A ====
Year	Gold	Silver	Bronze
2002	(Hong Kong) Cheng Lai Sho	(Japan) Maho Kobayashi	(Malaysia) Sharifa Intan Su Harun
2005	(Japan) Akiyo Noguchi	(Japan) Nozomi Monma	(China) Guan Xiaotong
2008	Unknown		
2009	(India) Neha Prakash	(Iran) Fatemeh Jafari Mahmodabadi	(Hong Kong) Yuen Wing Sze
2011	(Indonesia) Virgita Nadya Putri	(Japan) Tsukasa Mizuguchi	(South Korea) Kim So-lah
2012	(South Korea) Cho Hai-mi	(South Korea) Kim So-lah	(Kazakhstan) Yelena Grunyashina
2013	(Kazakhstan) Yelena Grunyashina	(China) Niu Di	(Japan) Ayane Sakai
2015	(Japan) Miwa Oba	(Japan) Kokoro Takata	(South Korea) Bae Ji-won
2016	(Japan) Homare Toda	(Japan) Kokoro Takata	(South Korea) Bae Ji-won
2017	(South Korea) Kim Lan	(Japan) Karin Kojima	(South Korea) Son Seung-a
2018	(Japan) Natsumi Hirano	(South Korea) Kim Lan	(Japan) Miu Kurita
2019	(Japan) Saki Kikuchi	(Iran) Mahya Darabian	(South Korea) Hyewon Joo
2023	(Japan) Michika Nagashima	(South Korea) Chaeyeong Kim	(Japan) Manami Yama
2024	(Japan) Kanna Fujimura	(Iran) Mahdisa Hamidnezhad	(Indonesia) Taqiyya Nur Aziza

==== Youth B ====
Year	Gold	Silver	Bronze
2002	(South Korea) Kim Ja-in	(South Korea) Do Eun-na	(China) Wei Shengju
2005	(Japan) Mihoko Imoto	(Thailand) Puntarika Tunyavanich	(Chinese Taipei) Wang Chi
2008	Unknown		
2009	(South Korea) Sa Sol	(Kazakhstan) Zhanna Molchanova	(Hong Kong) Wu Wing Yu
2011	(Kazakhstan) Yelena Grunyashina	(Japan) Mei Kotake	(Thailand) Tomas Watchareewan
2012	(Japan) Miwa Oba	(South Korea) Kim Seung-hyun	(Iran) Afsaneh Mirahmadi
2013	(Japan) Aya Kikuzawa	(Indonesia) Nanda Dea Cahyaningtyas	(Japan) Miwa Oba
2015	(Japan) Shuri Nishida	(South Korea) Lee Ga-hee	(South Korea) Park Do-yeon
2016	(Japan) Futaba Ito	(South Korea) Kim Lan	(Japan) Saki Kikuchi
2017	(Japan) Ai Mori	(Japan) Natsuki Tanii	(Japan) Futaba Ito
2018	(South Korea) Seo Chae-hyun	(Japan) Ai Mori	(Japan) Natsuki Tanii
2019	(Japan) Ryu Nakagawa	(Japan) Hana Koike	(Japan) Sana Ogura
2023	(China) Xuanzhen Chen	(Japan) Kohana Mugishima	(South Korea) Yeonjoo Jung
2024	(Japan) Arisa Hayashi	(Indonesia) Tsany Alma Ariella	(Japan) Marin Nakamura

==== U19 ====
Year	Gold	Silver	Bronze
2025	(China) Chen Xuanzhen	(Japan) Manami Yama	(Japan) Moka Mochizuki
2026	(Japan) Kohana Mugishima	(Japan) Karin Yokomichi	(Japan) Shiori Murasugi

==== U17 ====
Year	Gold	Silver	Bronze
2025	(Japan) Marin Nakamura	(Japan) Arisa Hayashi	(China) Meini Li
2026	(China) Yijing Lu	(China) Meini Li	(South Korea) Ha Been Kim

=== Speed ===
==== Juniors ====
Year	Gold	Silver	Bronze
2005	(Hong Kong) Cheng Lai Sho	(China) Zhang Dan	(Philippines) Suzanne Davis
2008	Unknown		
2009	(India) Senjam Debala Devi	(Kazakhstan) Anastassiya Bryakina	(Kazakhstan) Evgeniya Gutak
2011	(Singapore) Janice Ng Li	(Indonesia) Abdul Rohma Syarifah	(Kazakhstan) Zhaina Myrzakhanova
2012	(South Korea) Sol Sa	(Iran) Kobra Lakzaiifar	(Kazakhstan) Raushan Kenzheakhmetova
2013	(Indonesia) Haslim Haspriani	(Indonesia) Zuyina Ulfati	(Singapore) Zhang Bin Bin
2015	(Kazakhstan) Assel Marlenova	(Japan) Miho Nonaka	(Indonesia) Sari Agustina
2016	(Kazakhstan) Assel Marlenova	(Iran) Hadis Nazarirobati	(Iran) Saba Noorsina
2017	(Indonesia) Devi Berthdigna	(Kazakhstan) Margarita Agambayeva	(South Korea) Kim Seo-hyun
2018	(China) Deng Lijuan	(China) Li Xiaoyu	(China) Tian Peiyang
2019	(India) Shivpreet Pannu	(Japan) Mao Nakamura	(India) Shivani Charak
2023	(China) Yafei Zhou	(South Korea) Hanareum Sung	(China) Jingyue Fan
2024	(Japan) Karin Hayashi	(Japan) Fumika Kawakami	(South Korea) Hanareum Sung

==== Youth A ====
Year	Gold	Silver	Bronze
2005	(China) Li Xuqing	(Japan) Akiyo Noguchi	(China) Guan Xiaotong
2008	Unknown		
2009	(Kazakhstan) Zhaina Myrzakhanova	(Kazakhstan) Yuliya Popova	(Kazakhstan) Nadezhda Bryakina
2011	(Indonesia) Zuyina Ulfati	(India) Chea Amelia Marak	(Thailand) Pratthana Raksachat
2012	(Kazakhstan) Yelena Grunyashina	(Kazakhstan) Xeniya Streltsova	(Kazakhstan) Zhazira Myrzakhanova
2013	(Indonesia) Wardani Nova Bina	(Kazakhstan) Assel Marlenova	(Kazakhstan) Yelena Grunyashina
2015	(China) Wang Xiran	(Indonesia) Devi Berthdigna	(Kazakhstan) Margarita Agambayeva
2016	(South Korea) Ko Jeong-ran	(Kazakhstan) Margarita Agambayeva	(Iran) Souroor Ansarian
2017	(China) Song Yiling	(China) Ni Mingwei	(South Korea) Ko Jeong-ran
2018	(Iran) Mahya Darabian	(China) Ni Mingwei	(China) Song Yiling
2019	(Iran) Mahya Darabian	(Kazakhstan) Adeliya Utesheva	(Japan) Saki Kikuchi
2023	(China) Feiyan Yang	(Japan) Fumika Kawakami	(China) Tianxiang Zhang
2024	(Indonesia) Aninda Qalbi Arsyilah	(India) Joga Purty	(South Korea) Jimin Hwang

==== Youth B ====
Year	Gold	Silver	Bronze
2005	(Indonesia) Santi Wellyanti	(Philippines) Tala Marie Taningco	(Thailand) Puntarika Tunyavanich
2008	Unknown		
2009	(Kazakhstan) Kseniya Strelcova	(Kazakhstan) Sabina Khaibullina	(India) Chea Amelia Marak
2011	(Kazakhstan) Assel Marlenova	(Kazakhstan) Yelena Grunyashina	(Kyrgyzstan) Vera Bogoliubova
2012	(Kazakhstan) Assel Marlenova	(Iran) Hadis Nazarirobati	(Iran) Mina Aramideh
2013	(Indonesia) Juskerina Juskerina	(China) Chen Zhuoying	(India) Sadhvi Kukreja
2015	(China) Tian Peiyang	(Indonesia) Ragil Rakasiwi Kharisma	(China) Wen Yongsen
2016	(Iran) Mahya Darabian	(China) Ni Mingwei	(China) Song Yiling
2017	(Iran) Mahya Darabian	(Kazakhstan) Adeliya Utesheva	(China) Yu Yimei
2018	(Indonesia) Narda Mutia Amanda	(China) Li Jingyu	(South Korea) Jeong Ji-min
2019	(Kazakhstan) Tanzila Ospan	(India) Anisha Verma	(India) Saniya Farooque Shaikh
2023	(China) Xinyi Huang	(Japan) Kohana Mugishima	(China) Jiaxin Tang
2024	(South Korea) Yunseo Cho	(Japan) Natsumi HARA	(Indonesia) Tsaniya Erna Kusumawati

=== Bouldering ===
==== Juniors ====
Year	Gold	Silver	Bronze
2015	(Japan) Miho Nonaka	(South Korea) Kim Min-seon	(South Korea) Cho Hai-mi
2016	(Iran) Afsaneh Mirahmadi	(Kazakhstan) Assel Marlenova	(China) Wang Xiran
2017	(Japan) Kokoro Takata	(Kazakhstan) Margarita Agambayeva	(South Korea) Park Mi-ni
2018	(Japan) Mao Nakamura	(Japan) Kokoro Takata	(Japan) Honoka Moriwaki
2019	(Iran) Rahil Ramezani	(Japan) Mao Nakamura	(Japan) Yuka Higuchi
2023	(China) Yajun Huang	(South Korea) Hanareum Sung	(Japan) Mashiro Kuzuu
2024	(Iran) Sarina Ghaffari	(Japan) Ai Takeuchi	(Japan) Sana Ogura

==== Youth A ====
Year	Gold	Silver	Bronze
2015	(Japan) Miwa Oba	(Japan) Kokoro Takata	(South Korea) Bae Ji-won
2016	(Japan) Homare Toda	(Japan) Kokoro Takata	(South Korea) Lee Ga-hee
2017	(Japan) Mao Nakamura	(Japan) Karin Kojima	(South Korea) Park Do-yeon
2018	(Japan) Natsumi Hirano	(Japan) Saki Kikuchi	(Japan) Miu Kurita
2019	(Iran) Mahaya Darabian	(Japan) Saki Kikuchi	(South Korea) Hyewon Joo
2023	(Japan) Michika Nagashima	(Hong Kong) Ziqi Elly Gao	(Japan) Manami Yama
2024	(Japan) Saaya Ishikuro	(Iran) Mahdisa Hamidnezhad	(Japan) Miu Ito

==== Youth B ====
Year	Gold	Silver	Bronze
2015	(Japan) Mao Nakamura	(Indonesia) Ragil Rakasiwi Kharisma	(Japan) Yuka Higuchi
2016	(Japan) Futaba Ito	(Iran) Mahya Darabian	(Japan) Saki Kikuchi
2017	(Japan) Futaba Ito	(Japan) Natsuki Tanii	(Japan) Ai Mori
2018	(Japan) Natsuki Tanii	(South Korea) Seo Chae-hyun	(China) Zhang Yuetong
2019	(Japan) Ryu Nakagawa	(Japan) Hana Koike	(Japan) Sana Ogura
2023	(China) Xuanzhen Chen	(Japan) Kohana Mugishima	(Japan) Akane Matsuura
2024	(South Korea) Gyurin Kim	(Japan) Iroha Yamazaki	(Japan) Waka Murakami

==== U19 ====
Year	Gold	Silver	Bronze
2025	(Japan) Manami Yama	(China) Chen Xuanzhen	(China) Zhu Xinwen
2026	(Japan) Akane Matsuura	(Japan) Iroha Yamazaki	(Japan) Nagi Karino

==== U17 ====
Year	Gold	Silver	Bronze
2025	(Japan) Marin Nakamura	(Japan) Akane Matsuura	(South Korea) Kim Gyurin
2026	(China) Youtian Tan	(China) Meini Li	(China) Yijing Lu

=== Boulder & Lead ===
==== Juniors ====
Year	Gold	Silver	Bronze
2023	(Japan) Tomona Takao	(Japan) Mashiro Kuzuu	(Japan) Sana Ogura

==== Youth A ====
Year	Gold	Silver	Bronze
2023	(Japan) Michika Nagashima	(Japan) Manami Yama	(South Korea) Juha Kim
