= Ardana Cikal Damarwulan =

Indonesian competition climber (born 2010)

Personal information
- Nickname: Cikal
- Nationality: Indonesian
- Born: 8 September 2010 (age 15) Bandung, West Java, Indonesia
- Education: PKBM Homeschooling Pewaris Bangsa Bandung

Climbing career
- Type of climber: Competition climbing; Bouldering; Sport climbing
Medal record
Men's competition climbing
Representing Indonesia
SEA Games
Gold medal – first place	2025 Thailand	Men's lead
Asian Youth Championships
Gold medal – first place	2026 Guiyang	Men's boulder (U17)

Ardana Cikal Damarwulan (born 8 September 2010), commonly known as Cikal, is an Indonesian competition climber who competes in bouldering and lead climbing events. He won the men's lead gold medal at the 2025 SEA Games, and the U17 men's boulder title at the 2026 World Climbing Asia Youth Championship. He also won the youth lead and boulder events at the inaugural ASEAN Climbing Championship in 2025.

== Early life ==
Cikal was born in Bandung, West Java, on 8 September 2010. He developed an interest in climbing as a young child and began training at the Eiger Climbing Club in Bandung at around the age of seven. His first competition was the Eiger Independence Sport Climbing Competition in 2018.

== Climbing career ==
Cikal began competing in international competition climbing events in 2024. At the IFSC Youth World Championships in Guiyang, China, he finished 19th in boulder and 27th in lead. Later that year, he finished sixth in both disciplines at the IFSC Youth Asian Championships in Jamshedpur, India.

In July 2025, Cikal won both the youth men's boulder and lead competitions at the ASEAN Climbing Championship in Putrajaya, Malaysia. He won the boulder event with 84.7 points, narrowly ahead of Singapore's Mitchell Charles Boyer Hai Jie on 84.5 points. In lead, Cikal scored 27+, finishing ahead of Boyer with 27 and Singapore's Dylan Seow Yong Kang with 25+.

Cikal made his SEA Games debut at the 2025 SEA Games in Thailand. He won the men's lead gold medal with a score of 39+, ahead of Thailand's Auswin Aueareechit with 38 and fellow Indonesian Mahesa Caesar with 37+. He later described the result as unexpected and said that the SEA Games marked the beginning of his ambitions to compete at higher-level Asian and Olympic competitions.

In July 2026, he competed in the U17 lead and boulder events at the World Climbing Youth Championship in Arco, Italy. He reached the lead semifinal and finished 13th. In boulder, Cikal progressed from 21st in qualification to sixth in the semifinal, earning a place in the eight-athlete final, where he finished seventh with 19.9 points. His appearance in the final was reported by the Indonesian Climbing Federation as the first time an Indonesian climber had reached an international boulder final.

In August 2026, Cikal competed in both lead and boulder at the 2026 World Climbing Asia Youth Championship in Guiyang, China. He won the U17 men's boulder event, earning his first Asian youth championship title.
