= Shion Omata =

Japanese climber

Personal information
- Nationality: Japanese
- Born: March 23, 2006 (age 20) Tokyo, Japan
- Education: Nippon Sport Science University (Nittaidai)
- Height: 162 cm (5 ft 4 in)

Climbing career
- Type of climber: Competition lead climbing
- Known for: 2024 Asian Championships Lead Winner.
Medal record
Event / 1st / 2nd / 3rd; World Cup / / 1 / 2
Men's competition climbing
Representing Japan
World Cup (Overall)
Second place	2024	Lead
World Cup (Event)
Silver medal – second place	Wujiang 2023	Lead
Bronze medal – third place	Seoul 2024	Lead
Bronze medal – third place	Briançon 2024	Lead
Asian Championships
Gold medal – first place	2024	Lead
Bronze medal – third place	2026	Lead
- Updated on February 27, 2025

Shion Omata (小俣 史温, Omata Shion, born March 23, 2006) is a Japanese rock climber who specializes in competition lead climbing.

Omata started climbing on the IFSC Climbing World Cup circuit in 2023, placing 8th and 5th in the Villars and Briançon lead world cups respectively. He won the silver medal in the Wujiang world cup in his debut senior year.

In 2024, Omata was a finalist in 4 of 6 of the Lead World Cups, earning bronze in Briançon and Seoul. He also claimed the 2024 Lead title at the IFSC Climbing Asian Championships in Tai'an.

== Rankings ==
=== World Cup ===
Discipline	2023	2024	2025	2026
Lead	4	2	10	19

=== World Championships ===
Discipline	Seoul 2025
Lead	12

=== World Youth Championships ===
Discipline	2022 Youth A	2023 Youth A	2024 Juniors
Lead	5	2	3

=== Asian Championships ===
Discipline	2024	2026
Lead	1	3

=== Japan Cup ===
Discipline	2019	2020	2023	2024	2025	2026
Lead	62	19	1	1	3	2
Bouldering	-	-	30	37	-	33

== Number of medals at the IFSC Climbing World Cup ==
=== Lead ===
Season	Gold	Silver	Bronze	Total
2023		1		1
2024			2	2
Total	0	1	2	3
