= 2026 World Climbing Youth Championship =

Competition climbing event

World Climbing Youth Championship Arco 2026
- Venue: Arco Climbing Stadium
- Location: Arco, Italy
- Date: 18-25 July 2026

The 2026 World Climbing Youth Championship, officially titled the World Climbing Youth Championship Arco 2026, is the 35th edition of the annual world youth championship for competition climbing. It was being held at the Arco Climbing Stadium in Arco, Italy, from 18 to 25 July 2026. The championship is organized by World Climbing in cooperation with the Italian Sport Climbing Federation.

The competition comprises men's and women's events in boulder, lead and speed climbing in the under-17 and under-19 age categories. More than 750 athletes representing 69 nations across six continents are participating. Arco previously hosted the Youth World Championships in 2015 and 2019.

== Medal table ==
* Host nation (Italy)

Rank	Nation	Gold	Silver	Bronze	Total
1	China	3	1	3	7
1	Japan	3	1	3	7
3	South Korea	2	3	1	6
4	Germany	1	0	1	2
4	Switzerland	1	0	1	2
6	Austria	1	0	0	1
6	New Zealand	1	0	0	1
8	Ukraine	0	2	0	2
9	France	0	1	1	2
9	Italy*	0	1	1	2
11	Indonesia	0	1	0	1
11	Thailand	0	1	0	1
11	United States	0	1	0	1
14	Individual Neutral Athletes	0	0	1	1
Totals (14 entries)		12	12	12	36

== Medalists ==
=== Male ===
Event	Gold	Silver	Bronze
Under 19
Lead	Chanjin Jung; South Korea	Andrea Ludovico Chelleris; Italy	Ryusei Hamada; Japan
Speed	Yanze Shi; China	Haddan Malik Baqmuhyibar; Indonesia	Gilles Meili; Switzerland
Bouldering	Beomjin Park; South Korea	Chanjin Jung; South Korea	Matteo Reusa; Italy
Under 17
Lead	Kazuki Nakata; Japan	Hayool Lee; South Korea	Taketo Saiki; Japan
Speed	Mingyi Zhou; China	Minh Long Nguyen-Angelot; France	Moritz Müller; Germany
Bouldering	Kazuki Nakata; Japan	Taketo Saiki; Japan	Hayool Lee; South Korea

=== Female ===
Event	Gold	Silver	Bronze
Under 19
Lead	Anika Deubler; Austria	Rafael Kazbekova; Ukraine	Natsumi Oda; Japan
Speed	Xinyi Huang; China	Polina Khalkevych; Ukraine	Milana Melnichenko; Individual Neutral Athletes
Bouldering	Paula Mayer-Vorfelder; Germany	Analise Van Hoang; United States	Louise Puech Yazid; France
Under 17
Lead	Arisa Hayashi; Japan	Ha Been Kim; South Korea	Meini Li; China
Speed	Mila Piatek; New Zealand	Kanyanat Arsakit; Thailand	Nuo Chen; China
Bouldering	Amélie Kägi; Switzerland	Youtian Tan; China	Meini Li; China
