= Lead Japan Cup 2025 =

Annual competition climbing event

- Venue: DMG MORI Arena
- Location: Iga, Mie, Japan
- Date: 1 – 2 March 2025
- Website: https://www.jma-climbing.org/competition/2025/ljc/

Medalists
gold medal	Sorato Anraku / Ai Mori
silver medal	Neo Suzuki / Mei Kotake
bronze medal	Shion Omata / Natsumi Oda

The 2025 Lead Japan Cup was the 38th edition of the annual competition lead climbing event organised by the Japan Mountaineering and Sport Climbing Association (JMSCA), held in DMG MORI Arena, Mie.

LJC is the sole selection event for Japan's national lead team. Athletes who place highly at the LJC are eligible to compete in the Lead World Cups, subject to JMSCA's prevailing selection criteria. LJC 2025 was the first domestic lead competition of the 2025 season. 54 men and 53 women competed, with Sorato Anraku and Ai Mori winning the men's and women's titles respectively.

== Finals ==
=== Men ===
The men's lead finals took place on 2 March 2025.

Rank	Name	Final
1	Sorato Anraku	42+
2	Neo Suzuki	37
3	Shion Omata	35+
4	Hiroto Shimizu	34+
5	Masahiro Higuchi	31+
6	Satone Yoshida	27+
7	Ao Yurikusa	27+
8	Taisei Homma	24+

=== Women ===
The women's lead finals took place on 2 March 2025.

Rank	Name	Final
1	Ai Mori	TOP
2	Mei Kotake	42+
3	Natsumi Oda	33
4	Mashiro Kuzuu	32+
5	Miho Nonaka	32+
6	Natsuki Tanii	22+
7	Ryu Nakagawa	21+
8	Natsumi Hirano	21+

== Semifinals ==
=== Men ===
The men's lead semifinals took place on 2 March 2025.

Rank	Name	Semifinal	Notes
1	Sorato Anraku	TOP	Q
2	Taisei Homma	44+	Q
3	Neo Suzuki	40+	Q
4	Satone Yoshida	40+	Q
5	Ao Yurikusa	40+	Q
6	Shion Omata	36+	Q
7	Hiroto Shimizu	36+	Q
8	Masahiro Higuchi	36+	Q
9	Tomoa Narasaki	35+	
10	Hareru Nagamori	35+	
11	Yuta Imaizumi	35+	
12	Shuta Tanaka	35+	
13	Yuji Fujiwaki	35+	
14	Kisato Wada	34+	
15	Genbu Uehara	33+	
16	Mototaka Ishizu	32	
17	Manato Kurashiki	32	
18	Zento Murashita	31	
19	Hiroto Nishio	31	
20	Taito Nakagami	31	
21	Yusuke Sugimoto	30+	
22	Kaya Otaka	30	
23	Haru Funaki	29	
24	Satoki Tanaka	28+	
25	Ryohei Kameyama	28	
26	Kokoro Fujii	27	
27	Rei Sasaki	1+	

=== Women ===
The women's lead semifinals took place on 2 March 2025.

Rank	Name	Semifinal	Notes
1	Ai Mori	TOP	Q
2	Mei Kotake	35+	Q
3	Natsumi Oda	35	Q
4	Mashiro Kuzuu	32+	Q
5	Ryu Nakagawa	32	Q
6	Miho Nonaka	31+	Q
7	Natsuki Tanii	30	Q
8	Natsumi Hirano	30	Q
9	Mai Kobayashi	30	
10	Kohana Mugishima	30	
11	Sana Ogura	30	
12	Tomona Takao	29+	
13	Moka Mochizuki	29+	
14	Risa Ota	29+	
15	Hana Koike	28+	
16	Nonoha Kume	28+	
17	Miku Ishii	28+	
18	Manami Yama	28+	
19	Kaho Murakoshi	28+	
20	Nanako Kura	26+	
21	Kaho Yamane	25+	
22	Sawa Kakizaki	25+	
23	Yuno Harigae	25+	
24	Towako Nakata	23+	
25	Mitsu Yamada	21+	
26	Kiki Matsuda	20+	
27	Ichika Osawa	19+	

== Qualifications ==
=== Men ===
The men's lead qualifications took place on 1 March 2025.

Rank	Name	Qualification					Notes
Rank	Name	Route A		Route B		Points	Notes
Rank	Name	Score	Rank	Score	Rank	Points	Notes
1	Sorato Anraku	TOP	1	27+	1	1.41	Q
2	Tomoa Narasaki	38+	2	27+	1	2.00	Q
3	Neo Suzuki	37+	3	27+	1	3.16	Q
4	Taisei Homma	37+	3	26+	4	5.00	Q
4	Satone Yoshida	37+	3	26+	4	5.00	Q
6	Ao Yurikusa	35+	8	26+	4	6.71	Q
7	Kokoro Fujii	37+	3	23	9	6.89	Q
8	Zento Murashita	37+	3	21+	18	10.12	Q
9	Rei Sasaki	33+	12	23	9	11.11	Q
10	Kisato Wada	35+	8	22+	11	11.22	Q
11	Hareru Nagamori	34+	11	22+	11	12.41	Q
12	Yuta Imaizumi	26+	24	25+	7	13.36	Q
13	Shion Omata	33+	12	22+	11	13.49	Q
14	Yusuke Sugimoto	32+	15	22+	11	14.73	Q
15	Ryohei Kameyama	25+	28	23+	8	15.10	Q
16	Mototaka Ishizu	25+	8	21	24	15.44	Q
17	Satoki Tanaka	30	18	22+	11	15.87	Q
18	Hiroto Shimizu	32+	15	21+	18	17.83	Q
19	Hiroto Nishio	25+	28	22+	11	19.97	Q
20	Haru Funaki	27+	19	21+	18	20.75	Q
20	Masahiro Higuchi	27+	19	21+	18	20.75	Q
22	Manato Kurashiki	32	17	21	24	21.22	Q
23	Genbu Uehara	33+	12	16	37	22.80	Q
24	Yuji Fujiwaki	23	38	22+	11	23.22	Q
25	Taito Nakagami	27+	19	21	24	23.59	Q
25	Kaya Otaka	27+	19	21	24	23.59	Q
25	Shuta Tanaka	27+	19	21	24	23.59	Q
28	Hidemasa Nishida	26+	24	21	24	26.00	
29	Kento Yamaguchi	26+	24	19+	31	28.12	
30	Ryota Toda	26+	24	18+	33	29.01	
31	Shuma Yamane	24+	31	19	32	31.50	
32	Kaede Fujita	20	48	21+	18	31.53	
33	Ryoei Nukui	16+	50	21+	18	32.33	
34	Rikuto Inohana	25	30	16	37	34.64	
35	Rikuto Nobuchika	23+	32	17	35	34.75	
36	Akira Tsunoda	23+	32	16+	36	35.24	
37	Akira Shimizu	23+	32	16	37	37.15	
38	Tatsuhiro Yoshioka	21+	40	18	34	38.46	
39	Kosei Aoyama	23+	32	15+	44	39.18	
40	Shuto Matsusawa	23	38	16	37	39.24	
41	Riku Ishihara	23+	32	14+	46	40.05	
42	Yura Yamaguchi	16	53	20	30	40.06	
43	Rui Funakoshi	21+	40	16	37	41.71	
43	Keisetsu Onishi	21+	40	16	37	41.71	
43	Tomoaki Takata	21+	40	16	37	41.71	
46	Ryotaro Nakajima	23+	32	11+	52	42.56	
47	Ryotaro Nakajima	21+	40	15+	44	44.00	
48	Hiroki Kawakami	21+	40	14	48	46.17	
49	Sakuya Ishiguro	21+	40	13+	51	47.10	
50	Haruyoshi Morimoto	20	48	14+	46	47.49	
51	Kaede Koga	21+	40	8	54	48.47	
52	Taisei Funaki	16+	50	14	48	49.99	
53	Rinze Masuda	16	53	14	48	51.20	
54	Yamato Suzuki	16+	50	11+	52	51.74	

=== Women ===
The women's lead qualifications took place on 1 March 2025.

Rank	Name	Qualification					Notes
Rank	Name	Route A		Route B		Points	Notes
Rank	Name	Score	Rank	Score	Rank	Points	Notes
1	Ai Mori	TOP	1	TOP	1	1.22	Q
2	Hana Koike	40+	2	TOP	1	1.73	Q
3	Tomona Takao	39+	3	42+	3	3.24	Q
4	Mei Kotake	35	4	42+	3	3.97	Q
5	Natsuki Tanii	35	4	34+	5	4.74	Q
6	Natsumi Oda	34+	6	32+	8	7.21	Q
7	Miho Nonaka	33+	8	33+	6	8.06	Q
7	Natsumi Hirano	33+	8	33+	6	8.06	Q
9	Moka Mochizuki	34+	6	30+	10	8.65	Q
10	Ryu Nakagawa	33+	8	31	9	9.49	Q
11	Risa Ota	33+	8	30+	10	10.72	Q
12	Mai Kobayashi	31+	14	30+	10	12.69	Q
13	Mashiro Kuzuu	33+	8	28+	16	13.42	Q
14	Nonoha Kume	30+	15	30	14	14.73	Q
15	Miku Ishii	30+	15	29	15	15.25	Q
16	Kaho Yamane	27+	21	30+	10	15.54	Q
17	Sawa Kakizaki	28+	17	28+	16	18.25	Q
18	Manami Yama	25+	24	28+	16	20.78	Q
19	Kaho Murakoshi	28+	17	27+	21	21.07	Q
20	Kiki Matsuda	22+	26	28+	16	22.25	Q
21	Nanako Kura	26+	22	27+	21	22.98	Q
22	Towako Nakata	26	23	27+	21	23.49	Q
23	Mitsu Yamada	28+	17	26+	28	23.75	Q
24	Kohana Mugishima	21	31	28+	16	23.81	Q
25	Yuno Harigae	28+	17	26	34	25.26	Q
26	Ichika Osawa	22+	26	27+	21	25.69	Q
26	Sana Ogura	22+	26	27+	21	25.69	Q
28	Miu Kakizaki	32+	13	14+	50	25.87	
29	Kiho Nanba	21+	30	27+	21	26.83	
30	Sora Ito	25	25	26+	28	27.61	
31	Ayane Kashiwa	22+	26	26+	28	28.96	
32	Ai Takeuchi	20	42	27+	21	31.75	
33	Suzu Matoba	20+	33	26+	28	33.59	
33	Michika Nagashima	20+	33	26+	28	33.59	
35	Yuka Higuchi	21	31	25+	36	34.14	
36	Hanasa Takahashi	20+	33	25+	36	37.00	
36	Suzu Hasegawa	20+	33	25+	36	37.00	
38	Ayaka Kaji	20+	33	24+	39	37.99	
39	Koko Masuda	18+	46	26+	28	38.46	
40	Misa Inoue	20+	33	22+	42	39.65	
41	Sora Kaneki	18+	46	26	34	40.91	
42	Kotomi Yamanaka	20+	33	20+	46	41.48	
43	Kazuki Hagiwara	19	44	23+	40	42.45	
44	Serina Koyama	20+	33	15	49	42.58	
45	Kokoro Takata	20+	33	14+	50	43.65	
46	An Inagaki	18+	46	23+	40	44.32	
47	Honoka Oda	19+	43	20+	46	44.72	
48	Aori Fukumitsu	18+	46	22+	42	45.40	
49	Kanna Fujimura	19	44	19+	48	46.22	
50	Kazune Kobayashi	18+	46	21+	44	46.46	
51	Narumi Horita	15+	53	21+	44	48.56	
52	Utano Akutsu	18+	46	14+	50	49.98	
53	Kana Okawa	16	52	14+	50	51.75	
