= Waka Murakami =

Japanese rock climber

Personal information
- Nationality: Japan
- Born: 2010

Climbing career
- Type of climber: Competition climbing
Medal record
Women's competition climbing
World Youth Championships
| Bronze medal – third place | 2024 Guiyang | Youth B Bouldering |
Asian Youth Championships
| Bronze medal – third place | 2024 Jamshedpur | U16 Bouldering |

Waka Murakami (村上 和香, Murakami Waka) is a Japanese rock climber who specializes in competition climbing.

In August 2024, She won bronze medal in the competition bouldering event at the IFSC Climbing World Youth Championships. In November 2024, She won bronze medal in the bouldering event at the IFSC Climbing Asian Youth Championships.
