= Sport climbing at the 2026 Asian Beach Games =

Sport competition at the 2026 Asian Beach Games

- Venue: Tianya Haijiao
- Dates: 28–29 April 2026

Sport climbing competition at the 2026 Asian Beach Games was held at the West Gate of the Tianya Haijiao Scenic Spot in Sanya, China from 28 to 29 April 2026. A total of 72 athletes from 12 nations participated.

In the qualifying round of the men's individual, Zhao Yicheng set a new world record for the climb, clocking in at 4.58 seconds, bettering Samuel Watson's 4.64 seconds; he would go on to win the gold without actually contesting the final against Antasyafi Robby Al Hilmi, as Zhao was awarded the win due to Al Hilmi's false start, the only occurrence in the knockout stages of that event.

The women's individual saw all 4 semifinalists come from China, with Zhou Yafei winning gold over Deng Lijuan, and Zhang Shaoqin claiming bronze over Qin Yumei, who herself had only made the semifinal due to her quarterfinal opponent, top seed Desak Made Rita Kusuma Dewi, falling short of the finish button, as Qin's time of 11.96 in that round was the second-slowest recorded in the knockout stages.

In the relay events, the men's final saw a rematch between China's Zhao and Indonesia's Al Hilmi (paired up with Long Jianguo and Raharjati Nursamsa respectively); this time the competitors raced to a proper conclusion, with China beating Indonesia and setting a world record in the process, and Kazakhstan's Rishat Khaibullin and Rashid Khaibullin winning bronze. In the women's event, Dewi and Kadek Adi Asih won gold for Indonesia, having set a world record earlier in the competition, with South Korea winning silver and China the bronze.

== Medalists ==
=== Men ===
Event	Gold	Silver	Bronze
Speed	Zhao Yicheng; China	Antasyafi Robby Al Hilmi; Indonesia	Rishat Khaibullin; Kazakhstan
Speed relay	China; Long Jianguo; Zhao Yicheng	Indonesia; Antasyafi Robby Al Hilmi; Raharjati Nursamsa	Kazakhstan; Rashid Khaibullin; Rishat Khaibullin

=== Women ===
Event	Gold	Silver	Bronze
Speed	Zhou Yafei; China	Deng Lijuan; China	Zhang Shaoqin; China
Speed relay	Indonesia; Kadek Adi Asih; Desak Made Rita Kusuma Dewi	South Korea; Jeong Ji-min; Sung Han-a-reum	China; Deng Lijuan; Zhou Yafei

== Medal table ==
Rank	Nation	Gold	Silver	Bronze	Total
1	China (CHN)	3	1	2	6
2	Indonesia (INA)	1	2	0	3
3	South Korea (KOR)	0	1	0	1
4	Kazakhstan (KAZ)	0	0	2	2
Totals (4 entries)		4	4	4	12

== Results ==
=== Men ===
==== Speed ====
28 April

===== Qualification =====
Rank	Athlete	Time
1	Zhao Yicheng (CHN)	4.58
2	Ryo Omasa (JPN)	4.72
3	Long Jianguo (CHN)	4.81
4	Raharjati Nursamsa (INA)	4.83
5	Aditya Tri Syahria (INA)	4.85
6	Damir Toktarov (KAZ)	4.92
7	Antasyafi Robby Al Hilmi (INA)	4.94
8	Wu Peng (CHN)	4.97
9	Aphiwit Limpanichpakdee (THA)	5.014
10	Shuto Fujino (JPN)	5.015
11	Rishat Khaibullin (KAZ)	5.052
12	Chu Shouhong (CHN)	5.056
13	Reza Alipour (IRI)	5.180
14	Ramaski Aswin Kristanto (INA)	5.182
15	Jun Yasukawa (JPN)	5.20
16	Shin Eun-cheol (KOR)	5.23
17	Ezell Low (SGP)	5.36
18	Milad Alipour (IRI)	5.37
19	Jung Yong-jun (KOR)	5.39
20	Mohammad Reza Sohrabi (IRI)	5.60
21	Lee Yong-su (KOR)	5.61
22	Sirapob Jirajaturapak (THA)	5.65
23	Denzel Chua (SGP)	5.79
24	Nasser Abuergeeb (KUW)	5.815
25	Choi Jong-bin (KOR)	5.817
26	Andre Ho (SGP)	5.94
27	Nawaphon Suwannarat (THA)	6.00
28	John Forones (PHI)	6.08
29	Ilia Zhidkov (KGZ)	6.09
30	Lin Chia-hsiang (TPE)	6.56
31	Nikita Ruzmikin (KGZ)	6.69
32	Amir Maimuratov (KAZ)	6.86
33	Rashid Khaibullin (KAZ)	7.14
34	Motonori Tabuchi (JPN)	7.19
35	Juan Miguel Azupardo (PHI)	7.20
36	Evgenii Gorshkov (KGZ)	7.23
37	Sergey Aplatchikov (KGZ)	8.61
38	Kevin Jeffrey Pascua (PHI)	10.12
39	Phanuphong Bunprakop (THA)	Fall
39	Gerardo Acebedo (PHI)	Fall

===== Knockout round =====
1/8 finals
Zhao Yicheng (CHN)	4.69
Shin Eun-cheol (KOR)	5.04
Wu Peng (CHN)	Fall
Aphiwit Limpanichpakdee (THA)	5.16
Raharjati Nursamsa (INA)	5.15
Reza Alipour (IRI)	Fall
Aditya Tri Syahria (INA)	4.97
Chu Shouhong (CHN)	4.94
Ryo Omasa (JPN)	5.00
Jun Yasukawa (JPN)	5.28
Antasyafi Robby Al Hilmi (INA)	4.89
Shuto Fujino (JPN)	Fall
Long Jianguo (CHN)	4.92
Ramaski Aswin Kristanto (INA)	Fall
Damir Toktarov (KAZ)	Fall
Rishat Khaibullin (KAZ)	5.04

Quarterfinals
Zhao Yicheng (CHN)	4.66
Aphiwit Limpanichpakdee (THA)	4.87
Raharjati Nursamsa (INA)	6.57
Chu Shouhong (CHN)	5.20
Ryo Omasa (JPN)	5.49
Antasyafi Robby Al Hilmi (INA)	4.98
Long Jianguo (CHN)	10.00
Rishat Khaibullin (KAZ)	4.84

Semifinals
Zhao Yicheng (CHN)	4.62
Chu Shouhong (CHN)	4.87
Antasyafi Robby Al Hilmi (INA)	4.81
Rishat Khaibullin (KAZ)	Fall

Gold medal match
Zhao Yicheng (CHN)	—
Antasyafi Robby Al Hilmi (INA)	FS
Bronze medal match
Chu Shouhong (CHN)	4.84
Rishat Khaibullin (KAZ)	4.81

==== Speed relay ====
29 April

===== Qualification =====
Rank	Team	Time
1	Indonesia 1 (INA); Antasyafi Robby Al Hilmi; Raharjati Nursamsa	10.14
2	Kazakhstan 2 (KAZ); Amir Maimuratov; Damir Toktarov	10.26
3	China 2 (CHN); Long Jianguo; Zhao Yicheng	10.35
4	Kazakhstan 1 (KAZ); Rashid Khaibullin; Rishat Khaibullin	10.82
5	Indonesia 2 (INA); Ramaski Aswin Kristanto; Aditya Tri Syahria	10.89
6	South Korea 1 (KOR); Jung Yong-jun; Shin Eun-cheol	11.00
7	Japan 1 (JPN); Shuto Fujino; Motonori Tabuchi	11.11
8	China 1 (CHN); Chu Shouhong; Wu Peng	11.12
9	South Korea 2 (KOR); Choi Jong-bin; Lee Yong-su	11.73
10	Thailand 1 (THA); Phanuphong Bunprakop; Aphiwit Limpanichpakdee	11.79
11	Singapore (SGP); Denzel Chua; Ezell Low	12.12
12	Japan 2 (JPN); Ryo Omasa; Jun Yasukawa	12.82
13	Iran (IRI); Milad Alipour; Reza Alipour	13.15
14	Thailand 2 (THA); Sirapob Jirajaturapak; Nawaphon Suwannarat	13.57
15	Kyrgyzstan 1 (KGZ); Evgenii Gorshkov; Nikita Ruzmikin	14.23
16	Kyrgyzstan 2 (KGZ); Sergey Aplatchikov; Ilia Zhidkov	15.21
17	Philippines 1 (PHI); Juan Miguel Azupardo; John Forones	15.47
18	Philippines 2 (PHI); Gerardo Acebedo; Kevin Jeffrey Pascua	21.68

===== Knockout round =====
1/8 finals
Indonesia 1	12.54
Kyrgyzstan 2	13.90
China 1	10.90
South Korea 2	14.17
Kazakhstan 1	12.46
Iran	FS
Indonesia 2	10.65
Japan 2	13.55
Kazakhstan 2	10.81
Kyrgyzstan 1	16.77
Japan 1	FS
Thailand 1	11.03
China 2	12.00
Thailand 2	Fall
South Korea 1	10.89
Singapore	11.93

Quarterfinals
Indonesia 1	11.25
China 1	FS
Kazakhstan 1	10.89
Indonesia 2	13.51
Kazakhstan 2	12.21
Thailand 1	12.06
China 2	10.04
South Korea 1	11.17

Semifinals
Indonesia 1	10.34
Kazakhstan 1	12.12
Thailand 1	FS
China 2	—

Gold medal match
Indonesia 1	9.80
China 2	9.75
Bronze medal match
Kazakhstan 1	11.98
Thailand 1	Fall

=== Women ===
==== Speed ====
28 April

===== Qualification =====
Rank	Athlete	Time
1	Desak Made Rita Kusuma Dewi (INA)	6.27
2	Zhou Yafei (CHN)	6.34
3	Jeong Ji-min (KOR)	6.40
4	Kadek Adi Asih (INA)	6.60
5	Deng Lijuan (CHN)	6.70
6	Zhang Shaoqin (CHN)	6.80
7	Sung Han-a-reum (KOR)	6.82
8	Qin Yumei (CHN)	6.94
9	Amanda Narda Mutia (INA)	6.95
10	Ren Koyamatsu (JPN)	6.99
11	Hwang Ji-min (KOR)	7.07
12	Fumika Kawakami (JPN)	7.50
13	Tamara Ulzhabayeva (KAZ)	7.52
14	Puja Lestari (INA)	7.62
15	Anna Balarshina (KAZ)	7.68
16	Ai Takeuchi (JPN)	7.71
17	Karin Hayashi (JPN)	7.74
18	Pi Ye-na (KOR)	8.09
19	Jeanette Koh (SGP)	8.31
20	Arina Novitskaya (KAZ)	8.46
21	Lee Hung-ying (TPE)	8.50
22	Napat Disyabut (THA)	8.63
23	Narada Disyabut (THA)	8.82
24	Alina Lvova (KAZ)	8.99
25	Nalat Disyabut (THA)	9.39
26	Alina Tian (KGZ)	9.44
27	Yca Dizon (PHI)	10.07
28	Elena Mikhailova (KGZ)	10.86
29	Leila Musuralieva (KGZ)	14.08
30	Anna Frolova (KGZ)	14.21
31	Precious Cabuya (PHI)	17.94
32	Mecca Cortizano (PHI)	18.27

===== Knockout round =====
1/8 finals
Desak Made Rita Kusuma Dewi (INA)	6.63
Ai Takeuchi (JPN)	7.92
Qin Yumei (CHN)	6.80
Amanda Narda Mutia (INA)	7.14
Kadek Adi Asih (INA)	6.75
Tamara Ulzhabayeva (KAZ)	7.57
Deng Lijuan (CHN)	6.87
Fumika Kawakami (JPN)	7.62
Zhou Yafei (CHN)	6.65
Anna Balarshina (KAZ)	7.71
Sung Han-a-reum (KOR)	6.89
Ren Koyamatsu (JPN)	13.02
Jeong Ji-min (KOR)	FS
Puja Lestari (INA)	—
Zhang Shaoqin (CHN)	6.69
Hwang Ji-min (KOR)	7.30

Quarterfinals
Desak Made Rita Kusuma Dewi (INA)	Fall
Qin Yumei (CHN)	11.96
Kadek Adi Asih (INA)	6.58
Deng Lijuan (CHN)	6.55
Zhou Yafei (CHN)	6.44
Sung Han-a-reum (KOR)	6.70
Puja Lestari (INA)	7.44
Zhang Shaoqin (CHN)	6.68

Semifinals
Qin Yumei (CHN)	Fall
Deng Lijuan (CHN)	6.45
Zhou Yafei (CHN)	6.39
Zhang Shaoqin (CHN)	6.42

Gold medal match
Deng Lijuan (CHN)	6.43
Zhou Yafei (CHN)	6.35
Bronze medal match
Qin Yumei (CHN)	6.67
Zhang Shaoqin (CHN)	6.54

==== Speed relay ====
29 April

===== Qualification =====
Rank	Team	Time
1	China 1 (CHN); Deng Lijuan; Zhou Yafei	13.50
2	China 2 (CHN); Qin Yumei; Zhang Shaoqin	13.92
3	South Korea 1 (KOR); Jeong Ji-min; Sung Han-a-reum	14.09
4	Indonesia 1 (INA); Kadek Adi Asih; Desak Made Rita Kusuma Dewi	14.27
5	Japan 1 (JPN); Karin Hayashi; Ren Koyamatsu	14.89
6	Indonesia 2 (INA); Puja Lestari; Amanda Narda Mutia	15.20
7	Japan 2 (JPN); Fumika Kawakami; Ai Takeuchi	15.64
8	Kazakhstan 1 (KAZ); Anna Balarshina; Tamara Ulzhabayeva	16.81
9	South Korea 2 (KOR); Hwang Ji-min; Pi Ye-na	17.60
10	Thailand (THA); Napat Disyabut; Narada Disyabut	17.75
11	Kazakhstan 2 (KAZ); Alina Lvova; Arina Novitskaya	17.94
12	Kyrgyzstan 1 (KGZ); Elena Mikhailova; Alina Tian	24.18
13	Philippines (PHI); Precious Cabuya; Yca Dizon	28.40
14	Kyrgyzstan 2 (KGZ); Anna Frolova; Leila Musuralieva	34.33

===== Knockout round =====
Quarterfinals
China 1	13.98
Kazakhstan 1	18.32
Indonesia 1	14.14
Japan 1	18.41
China 2	Fall
Japan 2	17.07
South Korea 1	13.66
Indonesia 2	14.98

Semifinals
China 1	13.178
Indonesia 1	13.174
Japan 2	18.07
South Korea 1	13.58

Gold medal match
Indonesia 1	13.76
South Korea 1	16.50
Bronze medal match
China 1	13.21
Japan 2	17.85
