= Ryusei Hamada =

Japanese competition climber (born 2009)

Personal information
- Nationality: Japanese
- Born: 25 January 2009 (age 17) Fujisawa, Kanagawa, Japan
- Education: Kamakura High School

Climbing career
- Type of climber: Competition lead climbing Competition bouldering
Medal record
Men's competition climbing
Representing Japan
World Youth Championships
Gold medal – first place	2025 Helsinki	Boulder
Gold medal – first place	2025 Helsinki	Lead
Gold medal – first place	2024 Guiyang	Boulder
Gold medal – first place	2023 Seoul	Lead
Silver medal – second place	2024 Guiyang	Lead
Silver medal – second place	2023 Seoul	Boulder
Bronze medal – third place	2026 Arco	Lead
Asian Youth Championships
Gold medal – first place	2024 Jamshedpur	Boulder

Ryusei Hamada (濱田 琉誠, Hamada Ryusei; born 25 January 2009) is a Japanese competition climber, specializing in competition lead climbing and competition bouldering.

== Youth competitions ==
At age 14, Hamada won gold in lead and silver in the boulder discipline at the 2023 World Youth Championships in the Youth B category.

In 2024, at the World Youth Championships in Guiyang, Hamada claimed gold in boulder. In the lead discipline, he took silver, losing gold to Jung Chanjin due to countback. He also became the only Japanese athlete to medal across both disciplines at the event. He ended the 2024 season by winning gold in boulder at the Asian Youth Championships.

At the 2025 World Youth Championships in Helsinki, Hamada achieved a Boulder-Lead double in the U17 category.

== Rankings ==
=== World Youth Championships ===
Discipline	2023 Youth B	2024 Youth B	2025 U17	2026 U19
Lead	1	2	1	3
Boulder	2	1	1	12

=== Japan Cup ===
Discipline	2026
Lead	8
Bouldering	33

=== Japan Youth Championships ===
Discipline	2023	2024	2025	2026
Lead	2	2	1	1
Boulder	3	1	2	4

=== Japan National Sports Festival ===
Discipline	2024	2025
Lead	5	1
Boulder	1	1
