= Lead Japan Cup 2024 =

Annual competition climbing event

- Venue: Kyushu Climbing Base SAGA
- Location: Taku, Saga, Japan
- Date: 23 – 24 February 2024
- Website: https://www.jma-climbing.org/competition/2024/ljc/

Medalists
| gold medal | Shion Omata / Ai Mori |
| silver medal | Masahiro Higuchi / Mei Kotake |
| bronze medal | Ao Yurikusa / Natsumi Oda |

The 2024 Lead Japan Cup was the 37th edition of the annual competition lead climbing event organised by the Japan Mountaineering and Sport Climbing Association (JMSCA), held in Kyushu Climbing Base SAGA, Saga.

LJC is the sole selection event for Japan's national lead team. Athletes who place highly at the LJC are eligible to compete in the Lead World Cups, subject to JMSCA's prevailing selection criteria. LJC 2024 was the first domestic lead competition of the 2024 season. 58 men and 56 women competed, with Shion Omata and Ai Mori winning the men's and women's titles respectively.

== Finals ==
=== Men ===
The men's lead finals took place on 24 February 2024.

| Rank | Name | Final |
|---|---|---|
| 1 | Shion Omata | 41+ |
| 2 | Masahiro Higuchi | 40+ |
| 3 | Ao Yurikusa | 34+ |
| 4 | Zento Murashita | 34+ |
| 5 | Yuta Imaizumi | 30+ |
| 6 | Shuta Tanaka | 29+ |
| 7 | Mototaka Ishizu | 24 |
| 8 | Hidemasa Nishida | 22 |

=== Women ===
The women's lead finals took place on 24 February 2024.

| Rank | Name | Final |
|---|---|---|
| 1 | Ai Mori | 46+ |
| 2 | Mei Kotake | 42 |
| 3 | Natsumi Oda | 41 |
| 4 | Futaba Ito | 40 |
| 5 | Tomona Takao | 39 |
| 6 | Mao Nakamura | 39 |
| 7 | Momoka Miyajima | 36+ |
| 8 | Natsuki Tanii | 35+ |

== Semifinals ==
=== Men ===
The men's lead semifinals took place on 24 February 2024.

| Rank | Name | Semifinal | Notes |
|---|---|---|---|
| 1 | Shion Omata | TOP | Q |
| 2 | Ao Yurikusa | TOP | Q |
| 3 | Hidemasa Nishida | 42+ | Q |
| 4 | Zento Murashita | 42+ | Q |
| 5 | Mototaka Ishizu | 42 | Q |
| 6 | Masahiro Higuchi | 40+ | Q |
| 7 | Shuta Tanaka | 40+ | Q |
| 8 | Yuta Imaizumi | 37+ | Q |
| 9 | Yuji Fujiwaki | 37+ | |
| 10 | Hiroto Shimizu | 37+ | |
| 11 | Taisei Homma | 37+ | |
| 12 | Sorato Anraku | 37 | |
| 13 | Taito Nakagami | 36 | |
| 14 | Tomoa Narasaki | 35 | |
| 15 | Kokoro Fujii | 34+ | |
| 16 | Yoshiyuki Ogata | 31+ | |
| 17 | Ritsu Kayotani | 31+ | |
| 18 | Manato Kurashiki | 31+ | |
| 19 | Yusuke Sugimoto | 31+ | |
| 20 | Sohta Amagasa | 31 | |
| 21 | Hareru Nagamori | 28+ | |
| 22 | Kisato Wada | 28+ | |
| 23 | Mizuki Tajima | 28+ | |
| 24 | Riku Ishihara | 28 | |
| 25 | Rei Sasaki | 15+ | |
| 26 | Haruki Uemura | 4 | |

=== Women ===
The women's lead semifinals took place on 24 February 2024.

| Rank | Name | Semifinal | Notes |
|---|---|---|---|
| 1 | Ai Mori | TOP | Q |
| 2 | Mei Kotake | 47 | Q |
| 3 | Natsumi Oda | 46 | Q |
| 4 | Futaba Ito | 45+ | Q |
| 5 | Tomona Takao | 45+ | Q |
| 6 | Natsuki Tanii | 44+ | Q |
| 7 | Momoka Miyajima | 43+ | Q |
| 8 | Mao Nakamura | 43 | Q |
| 9 | Ai Takeuchi | 43 | |
| 10 | Risa Ota | 43 | |
| 11 | Nonoha Kume | 42+ | |
| 12 | Miho Nonaka | 42+ | |
| 13 | Mai Kobayashi | 42+ | |
| 14 | Honoka Oda | 42+ | |
| 15 | Natsumi Hirano | 42 | |
| 16 | Miku Ishii | 41 | |
| 17 | Mashiro Kuzuu | 39+ | |
| 18 | Miu Kakizaki | 39+ | |
| 19 | Kohana Mugishima | 39+ | |
| 19 | Sana Ogura | 39+ | |
| 21 | Yuki Hiroshige | 37+ | |
| 22 | Michika Nagashima | 37+ | |
| 23 | Miu Kurita | 34 | |
| 24 | Yuno Harigae | 33+ | |
| 25 | Yuka Higuchi | 26+ | |
| 26 | Hatsune Takeishi | 26 | |

== Qualifications ==
=== Men ===
The men's lead qualifications took place on 23 February 2024.

| Rank | Name | Qualification | | | | | Notes |
| Rank | Name | Route A | | Route B | | Points | Notes |
| Rank | Name | Score | Rank | Score | Rank | Points | Notes |
|---|---|---|---|---|---|---|---|
| 1 | Shion Omata | 36+ | 2 | TOP | 1 | 2.00 | Q |
| 2 | Ao Yurikusa | 38+ | 1 | 40+ | 5 | 2.24 | Q |
| 3 | Sorato Anraku | 36+ | 2 | 42+ | 2 | 3.16 | Q |
| 3 | Hidemasa Nishida | 36+ | 2 | 42+ | 2 | 3.16 | Q |
| 5 | Mototaka Ishizu | 32+ | 7 | 42 | 4 | 5.48 | Q |
| 6 | Hareru Nagamori | 36+ | 2 | 37+ | 11 | 7.48 | Q |
| 6 | Masahiro Higuchi | 36+ | 2 | 37+ | 11 | 7.48 | Q |
| 8 | Kisato Wada | 32+ | 7 | 36+ | 19 | 12.40 | Q |
| 9 | Shuta Tanaka | 31+ | 9 | 37+ | 11 | 13.23 | Q |
| 9 | Yoshiyuki Ogata | 31+ | 9 | 37+ | 11 | 13.23 | Q |
| 11 | Yuta Imaizumi | 27 | 27 | 39+ | 6 | 13.25 | Q |
| 12 | Yuji Fujiwaki | 30+ | 17 | 38 | 9 | 13.26 | Q |
| 13 | Tomoa Narasaki | 28+ | 24 | 39 | 8 | 14.00 | Q |
| 14 | Rei Sasaki | 30 | 21 | 38 | 9 | 14.29 | Q |
| 15 | Hiroto Shimizu | 23+ | 36 | 39+ | 6 | 15.72 | Q |
| 16 | Ritsu Kayotani | 31+ | 9 | 36+ | 19 | 16.01 | Q |
| 16 | Zento Murashita | 31+ | 9 | 36+ | 19 | 16.01 | Q |
| 18 | Kokoro Fujii | 31+ | 9 | 35 | 24 | 17.32 | Q |
| 19 | Manato Kurashiki | 31+ | 9 | 34+ | 25 | 17.85 | Q |
| 20 | Mizuki Tajima | 29 | 23 | 37+ | 11 | 17.94 | Q |
| 21 | Taisei Homma | 28 | 26 | 37+ | 11 | 19.08 | Q |
| 22 | Sohta Amagasa | 30+ | 17 | 36+ | 19 | 19.47 | Q |
| 23 | Yusuke Sugimoto | 31+ | 9 | 32+ | 29 | 20.00 | Q |
| 24 | Riku Ishihara | 31+ | 9 | 31 | 37 | 21.65 | Q |
| 25 | Taito Nakagami | 23+ | 36 | 37+ | 11 | 23.07 | Q |
| 26 | Haruki Uemura | 25 | 30 | 37 | 18 | 23.43 | Q |
| 27 | Keita Dohi | 30+ | 17 | 32+ | 29 | 24.33 | |
| 28 | Tomoaki Takata | 30+ | 17 | 31 | 37 | 26.34 | |
| 29 | Satoki Tanaka | 28+ | 24 | 32+ | 29 | 28.00 | |
| 30 | Kaya Otaka | 23+ | 36 | 35+ | 23 | 29.56 | |
| 31 | Hiroki Kawakami | 30 | 21 | 30+ | 39 | 29.87 | |
| 32 | Junta Sekiguchi | 26+ | 28 | 32+ | 29 | 29.93 | |
| 33 | Ryohei Kameyama | 21+ | 42 | 34+ | 25 | 33.11 | |
| 34 | Shuto Matsusawa | 25 | 30 | 16 | 37 | 33.58 | |
| 35 | Kaede Fujita | 25+ | 29 | 30+ | 39 | 34.69 | |
| 36 | Hayato Tsuru | 24+ | 32 | 31+ | 36 | 34.73 | |
| 37 | Rikuto Inohana | 18+ | 50 | 33+ | 27 | 38.00 | |
| 38 | Haru Funaki | 21 | 45 | 32+ | 29 | 38.37 | |
| 38 | Haruto Imai | | 40 | 18 | 34 | 38.46 | |
| 40 | Shuhei Yukimaru | 25 | 30 | 29 | 51 | 39.44 | |
| 41 | Ryota Toda | 23+ | 36 | 30+ | 39 | 39.71 | |
| 41 | Isamu Kawabata | 23+ | 36 | 30+ | 39 | 39.71 | |
| 43 | Rikuto Nobuchika | 24+ | 32 | 29+ | 45 | 39.89 | |
| 44 | Yuichi Iwami | 18+ | 50 | 32+ | 29 | 40.99 | |
| 45 | Hiroto Nishio | 24+ | 32 | 28+ | 52 | 41.94 | |
| 46 | Kantaro Ito | 21+ | 42 | 30+ | 39 | 42.24 | |
| 47 | Yo Masuda | 24+ | 32 | 26+ | 54 | 42.73 | |
| 48 | Tatsuhiro Yoshioka | 21 | 45 | 30+ | 39 | 43.69 | |
| 49 | Yuta Kayotani | 20+ | 48 | 29+ | 45 | 48.00 | |
| 50 | Keita Watabe | 18+ | 50 | 29+ | 45 | 49.94 | |
| 50 | Toru Kofukuda | 18+ | 50 | 29+ | 45 | 49.94 | |
| 52 | Shuma Yamane | 21+ | 42 | 19+ | 58 | 49.94 | |
| 53 | Kenshin Hara | 20+ | 48 | 28+ | 52 | 50.46 | |
| 54 | Kanata Tanaka | 18 | 56 | 29+ | 45 | 51.58 | |
| 55 | Taiga Nakamura | 17 | 57 | 29+ | 45 | 52.03 | |
| 56 | Rinze Masuda | 18+ | 50 | 26+ | 54 | 53.49 | |
| 57 | Yamato Suzuki | 18+ | 50 | 20 | 57 | 54.70 | |
| 58 | Kaede Koga | 15+ | 58 | 20+ | 56 | 56.99 | |

=== Women ===
The women's lead qualifications took place on 23 February 2024.

| Rank | Name | Qualification | | | | | Notes |
| Rank | Name | Route A | | Route B | | Points | Notes |
| Rank | Name | Score | Rank | Score | Rank | Points | Notes |
|---|---|---|---|---|---|---|---|
| 1 | Ai Mori | TOP | 1 | TOP | 1 | 1.50 | Q |
| 1 | Mei Kotake | TOP | 1 | TOP | 1 | 1.50 | Q |
| 3 | Natsumi Hirano | 42+ | 3 | 43+ | 3 | 3.46 | Q |
| 4 | Futaba Ito | 42+ | 3 | 43 | 4 | 4.69 | Q |
| 5 | Mao Nakamura | 41+ | 6 | 43 | 4 | 5.74 | Q |
| 6 | Tomona Takao | 42+ | 3 | 42+ | 8 | 6.00 | Q |
| 7 | Nonoha Kume | 37 | 12 | 43 | 4 | 8.12 | Q |
| 8 | Miho Nonaka | 39+ | 8 | 42+ | 11 | 8.49 | Q |
| 9 | Ai Takeuchi | 39 | 9 | 41+ | 11 | 10.39 | Q |
| 10 | Mai Kobayashi | 38 | 10 | 41+ | 11 | 10.95 | Q |
| 11 | Honoka Oda | 40+ | 7 | 9 | 18 | 11.68 | Q |
| 12 | Momoka Mitashima | 36+ | 13 | 42+ | 8 | 14.39 | Q |
| 13 | Risa Ota | 30+ | 37 | 43 | 4 | 14.55 | Q |
| 14 | Natsumi Oda | 36+ | 13 | 41 | 14 | 17.94 | Q |
| 15 | Mashiro Kuzuu | 36+ | 13 | 40+ | 15 | 18.57 | Q |
| 16 | Miu Kakizaki | 37+ | 11 | 34 | 31 | 18.76 | Q |
| 17 | Miu Kurita | 36+ | 13 | 39+ | 16 | 19.48 | Q |
| 18 | Yuki Hiroshige | 36+ | 13 | 39 | 18 | 21.18 | Q |
| 19 | Natsuki Tanii | 36+ | 13 | 38+ | 22 | 22.75 | Q |
| 20 | Hatsune Takeishi | 36+ | 13 | 37+ | 24 | 23.49 | Q |
| 20 | Yuno Harigae | 28+ | 44 | 41+ | 11 | 23.49 | Q |
| 22 | Miku Ishii | 36+ | 13 | 34+ | 25 | 25.15 | Q |
| 22 | Michika Nagashima | 36+ | 13 | 34+ | 25 | 25.15 | Q |
| 22 | Yuka Higuchi | 36+ | 13 | 34+ | 25 | 25.15 | Q |
| 22 | Kohana Mugishima | 36+ | 13 | 34+ | 25 | 25.15 | Q |
| 22 | Sana Ogura | 36+ | 13 | 34+ | 25 | 25.15 | Q |
| 27 | Melody Sekikawa | 34+ | 35 | 39 | 18 | 26.12 | |
| 28 | Moka Mochizuki | 31 | 36 | 39 | 18 | 26.50 | |
| 29 | Mia Aoyagi | 36+ | 13 | 33+ | 34 | 28.17 | |
| 30 | Kaho Murakoshi | 36+ | 13 | 32+ | 36 | 28.77 | |
| 31 | Koko Masuda | 25+ | 50 | 39+ | 16 | 28.87 | |
| 32 | Kanna Fujimura | 36+ | 13 | 31+ | 37 | 29.37 | |
| 33 | Ryu Nakagawa | 36+ | 13 | 31 | 39 | 29.95 | |
| 34 | Sawa Kakizaki | 28+ | 44 | 38+ | 22 | 32.17 | |
| 35 | Ayane Kashiwa | 30+ | 37 | 34+ | 25 | 32.54 | |
| 36 | Anon Matsufuji | 35+ | 34 | 34 | 31 | 32.98 | |
| 37 | Sora Kudo | 36+ | 13 | 26+ | 44 | 33.40 | |
| 37 | Nanako Kura | 36+ | 13 | 26+ | 44 | 33.40 | |
| 37 | Kazuki Hagiwara | 36+ | 13 | 26+ | 44 | 33.40 | |
| 37 | Ichika Osawa | 36+ | 13 | 26+ | 44 | 33.40 | |
| 41 | Takada Kokoro | 36+ | 13 | 6 | 56 | 35.89 | |
| 42 | Mio Nukui | 25+ | 40 | 34 | 31 | 40.20 | |
| 43 | Serika Okawachi | 30 | 41 | 29+ | 42 | 41.50 | |
| 44 | Kazune Kobayashi | 29 | 43 | 30+ | 40 | 41.73 | |
| 45 | Kiki Matsuda | 29+ | 42 | 29 | 43 | 42.50 | |
| 46 | Manami Yama | 26+ | 49 | 31+ | 37 | 42.87 | |
| 47 | Souka Hasegawa | 30+ | 37 | 26+ | 44 | 43.21 | |
| 47 | Saki Kikuchi | 30+ | 37 | 26+ | 44 | 43.21 | |
| 49 | Hamasaki Koiha | 13+ | 56 | 33+ | 34 | 43.95 | |
| 50 | Ayaka Kaji | 24+ | 52 | 30+ | 40 | 46.11 | |
| 51 | Nanami Nobe | 28+ | 44 | 26+ | 44 | 47.23 | |
| 51 | Sora Ito | 28+ | 44 | 26+ | 44 | 47.23 | |
| 53 | Kiho Nanba | 28+ | 44 | 26 | 54 | 49.84 | |
| 54 | Kotomi Yamanaka | 24+ | 52 | 26+ | 44 | 50.46 | |
| 55 | Utaha Sasaki | 23 | 54 | 26+ | 44 | 51.18 | |
| 56 | Ryo Nakajima | 22+ | 55 | 25+ | 55 | 55.00 | |
