= World Climbing Asia Championship =

Competition climbing championship

- Status: active
- Genre: sports event
- Date: midyear
- Frequency: annual
- Inaugurated: 1992
- Organiser: World Climbing

The World Climbing Asia Championship is an annual Asian championship for competition climbing organized by World Climbing. Until 2006, it was called UIAA Asian Championships. It was called the IFSC Asian Championships from 2007 to 2025, when the International Federation of Sport Climbing was rebranded as World Climbing. In 2001, the first Bouldering Championship was held separately (from lead and speed competitions) from 19 to 20 December 2001 in Yung Ho, Taiwan. In 2018, at the Asian Championships in Kurayoshi, Japan, a combined format was introduced.

== Championships ==
Edition	Year	Location	Date(s)	Disciplines	Notes
1	1992	(South Korea) Seoul	12–13 December 1992	L	
2	1993	(China) Changchun	11–12 December 1993	L	
3	1994	(Japan) Matsumoto		L + S	
4	1995	Singapore		L + S	
7	1998	(Taiwan) Taoyuan	19–20 December 1998	L + S	
9	2000	(Malaysia) Kuala Lumpur	25–26 November 2000	L + S	
10	2001	(Indonesia) Jakarta	27–28 October 2001	L + S	
10	2001	(Taiwan) Yung Ho	19–20 December 2001	B	
11	2002	(Japan) Toyama	12–13 October 2002	L + S	
12	2003	(China) Beijing	23–24 August 2003	L + S	
13	2004	(South Korea) Jeolla Nam Do	30–31 October 2004	L + S	
14	2005	(Iran) Kerman	20–22 September 2005	L + S	
15	2006	(Taiwan) Kaohsiung	26–29 October 2006	L + B + S	
16	2007	(China) Guangzhou	8–11 November 2007	L + B + S	
17	2008	(China) Guangzhou	21–25 May 2008	L + B + S	
18	2009	(South Korea) Chuncheon	28–30 August 2009	L + B + S	
19	2010	(China) Changzhi	16–19 September 2010	L + B + S	
~~20~~	~~2011~~	(China) Huangshi	~~9–1 December 2011~~	L + B + S	
20	2012	(China) Leye	25–28 April 2012	L + B + S	
21	2013	(Iran) Tehran	22–24 May 2013	L + B + S	
22	2014	(Indonesia) Lombok	1–3 October 2014	L + B + S	
23	2015	(China) Ningbo	20–22 November 2015	L + B + S + SR	
24	2016	(China) Duyun	3–6 August 2016	L + B + S + SR	
25	2017	(Iran) Tehran	18–21 September 2017	L + B + S + SR	
26	2018	(Japan) Kurayoshi	7–11 November 2018	L + B + S + C	
27	2019	(Indonesia) Bogor	6–10 November 2019	L + B + S + C + SR	
28	2022	(South Korea) Seoul	10–16 October 2022	L + B + S + C	
29	2024	(China) Tai'an	10–14 October 2024	L + B + S	
30	2026	(China) Meishan	8–12 April 2026	L + B + S	

== Men's results ==
=== Lead ===
Year	Gold	Silver	Bronze
2000	(Japan) Yuji Hirayama	(South Korea) Son Sang-won	(Japan) Keita Mogaki
2001			
2002	(Japan) Takaaki Tsuiki	(South Korea) Kim Dong-sik	(South Korea) Cho Kyu-bog
2003	(South Korea) Kim Ja-ha	(China) Cao Rongwu	(China) Liu Changzhong
2004	(South Korea) Son Sang-won	(Japan) Yuji Hirayama	(South Korea) Chae Min-woo
2005	(South Korea) Son Sang-won	(South Korea) Kim Ja-bee	(Japan) Hidekazu Ito
2006	(Japan) Yuji Hirayama	(Japan) Sachi Anma	(South Korea) Son Sang-won
2007	(South Korea) Son Sang-won	(Japan) Sachi Anma	(South Korea) Min Hyun-bin
2008	(Japan) Sachi Anma	(South Korea) Min Hyun-bin	(South Korea) Son Sang-won
2009	(South Korea) Son Sang-won	(South Korea) Min Hyun-bin	(Japan) Hidekazu Ito
2010	(South Korea) Min Hyun-bin	(South Korea) Son Sang-won	(Japan) Kazuma Watanabe
2012	(South Korea) Min Hyun-bin	(Iran) Davoud Rekabi	(South Korea) Park Ji-hwan
2013	(Iran) Gholam Ali Baratzadeh	(Iran) Reza Kolasangian	(South Korea) Kim Ja-bee
2014	(South Korea) Min Hyun-bin	(Indonesia) Aan Aviansyah	(China) Ma Zida
2015	(Japan) Keiichiro Korenaga	(Japan) Minoru Nakano	(China) Qu Haibin
2016	(Japan) Keiichiro Korenaga	(China) Pan Yufei	(Japan) Taito Nakagami
2017	(Japan) Kokoro Fujii	(China) Qu Haibin	(Japan) Yoshiyuki Ogata
2018	(Japan) Kokoro Fujii	(Japan) Hidemasa Nishida	(Japan) Tomoaki Takata
2019	(Japan) Kokoro Fujii	(Japan) Shuta Tanaka	(Japan) Taisei Homma
2022	(Japan) Tomoa Narasaki	(Japan) Yoshiyuki Ogata	(Japan) Kokoro Fujii
2024	(Japan) Shion Omata	(China) Pan Yufei	(Japan) Satone Yoshida
2026	(Japan) Neo Suzuki	(Japan) Sorato Anraku	(Japan) Shion Omata

=== Bouldering ===
Year	Gold	Silver	Bronze
2001	(South Korea) Lee Jae-yong	(Japan) Yuichi Miyabo	(Japan) Tomoki Usami
2006	(Japan) Akito Matsushima	(South Korea) Son Sang-won	(Japan) Keita Mogaki
2007	(South Korea) Son Sang-won	(Japan) Keita Mogaki	(Japan) Kazuma Watanabe
2008	(Japan) Tsukuru Hori	(South Korea) Son Sang-won	(South Korea) Kim Jang-hyuk
2009	(South Korea) Son Sang-won	(Japan) Tsukuru Hori	(Japan) Kazuma Watanabe
2010	(South Korea) Min Hyun-bin	(Japan) Tsukuru Hori	(Japan) Keita Mogaki
2012	(Japan) Shinta Ozawa	(South Korea) Min Hyun-bin	(South Korea) Park Ji-hwan
2013	(Iran) Gholam Ali Baratzadeh	(South Korea) Kim Ja-bee	(South Korea) Min Hyun-bin
2014	(Indonesia) Aan Aviansyah	(China) Ma Zida	(China) Qu Haibin
2015	(Japan) Tsukuru Hori	(Japan) Keita Watabe	(Japan) Rei Sugimoto
2016	(Japan) Yoshiyuki Ogata	(Japan) Tomoa Narasaki	(South Korea) Chon Jong-won
2017	(Japan) Kokoro Fujii	(Japan) Yoshiyuki Ogata	(Japan) Keita Watabe
2018	(Japan) Meichi Narasaki	(Japan) Keita Watabe	(China) Pan Yufei
2019	(Japan) Katsura Konishi	(Japan) Kokoro Fujii	(Japan) Rei Kawamata
2022	(Japan) Tomoa Narasaki	(Japan) Yoshiyuki Ogata	(Japan) Katsura Konishi
2024	(Japan) Sorato Anraku	(Japan) Sohta Amagasa	(Japan) Tomoa Narasaki
2026	(South Korea) Lee Do-hyun	(Japan) Tomoa Narasaki	(Japan) Keita Dohi

=== Speed ===
Year	Gold	Silver	Bronze
2000	(Indonesia) Ronald Mamarimbing	(Hong Kong) Lai Chi Wai	(Malaysia) Daniel Abdullah
2001			
2002	(Hong Kong) Lai Chi Wai	(Malaysia) Tan Leong Wai	(Singapore) Yusof Yazid
2003	(Hong Kong) Lai Chi Wai	(China) Chen Xiaojie	(China) Ma Hetai
2004	(China) Chen Xiaojie	(Indonesia) Abudzar Yulianto	(South Korea) Hwang Pyeong-ju
2005	(Indonesia) Galar Pandu Asmoro	(Indonesia) Abudzar Yulianto	(China) Chen Xiaojie
2006	(Indonesia) Erianto Rozak	(Hong Kong) Lai Chi Wai	(Japan) Akito Matsushima
2007	(China) Zhong Qixin	(China) Chen Xiaojie	(China) Zhang Ning
2008	(China) Zhong Qixin	(China) Zhang Ning	(China) Chen Xiaojie
2009	(Kazakhstan) Alexandr Nigmatulin	(China) Zhong Qixin	(Kazakhstan) Mikhail Yekimenko
2010	(Kazakhstan) Alexandr Nigmatulin	(Iran) Omid Sheikhbahaei	(Iran) Mohsen Mohammadinejad
2012	(Indonesia) Rindi Sufriyanto	(Kazakhstan) Sayat Bokanov	(Kazakhstan) Alexey Molchanov
2013	(China) Zhong Qixin	(Iran) Reza Alipour	(Indonesia) Aspar Jaelolo
2014	(Indonesia) Fajri Ashari	(Indonesia) Rindi Sufriyanto	(Indonesia) Aspar Jaelolo
2015	(Indonesia) Galar Pandu Asmoro	(Iran) Reza Alipour	(China) Lin Penghui
2016	(Indonesia) Fajri Ashari	(Indonesia) Tonny Mamiri	(China) Ou Zhiyong
2017	(Iran) Reza Alipour	(China) Zhong Qixin	(Indonesia) Aspar Jaelolo
2018	(Indonesia) Alfian Muhammad Fajri	(Indonesia) Sabri	(Indonesia) Aspar Jaelolo
2019	(Indonesia) Veddriq Leonardo	(Indonesia) Kiromal Katibin	(Indonesia) Rahmad Adi Mulyono
2022	(South Korea) Lee Seung-beom	(Indonesia) Veddriq Leonardo	(Indonesia) Aspar Jaelolo
2024	(China) Wu Peng	(Kazakhstan) Amir Maimuratov	(Iran) Reza Alipour
2026	(China) Chu Shouhong	(China) Zhou Ziyu	(Indonesia) Veddriq Leonardo

=== Speed Relay ===
Year	Gold	Silver	Bronze
2015	Indonesia; Galar Pandu Asmoro; Aspar Jaelolo; Abudzar Yulianto	China; Li Guangdong; Ou Zhiyong; Zhong Qixin	South Korea; Chae Sung-joon; Cho Seung-woon; Kim Hyun-jae
2016	China; Lin Penghui; Ou Zhiyong; Zhong Qixin	Indonesia; Fajri Ashari; Aspar Jaelolo; Tonny Mamiri	China; Bianba Zhaxi; Li Guangdong; Li Guangfeng
2017	Indonesia; Aspar Jaelolo; Sabri; Rindi Sufriyanto	Iran; Ehsan Asrar; Mohammad Reza Ehteshamnia; Hamid Reza Touzandeh	Indonesia; Muhammad Hinayah; Septo Wibowo Siburian; Abudzar Yulianto
2019	Indonesia; Sabri; Rahmad Adi Mulyono; Fatchur Roji	Indonesia; Kiromal Katibin; Veddriq Leonardo; Zaenal Aripin	Kazakhstan; Amir Maimuratov; Rishat Khaibullin; Roman Kostyukov

=== Combined ===
Year	Gold	Silver	Bronze
2018	(Japan) Meichi Narasaki	(Japan) Rei Sugimoto	(China) Pan Yufei
2019	(Japan) Kokoro Fujii	(Japan) Yoshiyuki Ogata	(Japan) Yuta Imaizumi
2022	(Japan) Tomoa Narasaki	(Japan) Kokoro Fujii	(South Korea) Lee Do-hyun

== Women's results ==
=== Lead ===
Year	Gold	Silver	Bronze
2000	(South Korea) Go Mi-sun	(South Korea) Kim Hyun-jung	(Hong Kong) Liu Hiu Ying
2001			
2002	(South Korea) Go Mi-sun	(South Korea) Kim Hyun-jung	(Hong Kong) Liu Hiu Ying
2003	(South Korea) Go Mi-sun	(Japan) Rie Kimura	(China) Huang Liping
2004	(South Korea) Kim Ja-in	(South Korea) Go Mi-sun	(Japan) Yuka Kobayashi
2005	(South Korea) Kim Ja-in	(China) Huang Liping	(Hong Kong) Liu Hiu Ying
2006	(South Korea) Kim Ja-in	(Japan) Akiyo Noguchi	(Hong Kong) Liu Hiu Ying
2007	(South Korea) Kim Ja-in	(China) Huang Liping	(Hong Kong) Liu Hiu Ying
2008	(South Korea) Kim Ja-in	(Japan) Yuka Kobayashi	(South Korea) Han Seu-ran
2009	(South Korea) Kim Ja-in	(Japan) Akiyo Noguchi (South Korea) Han Seu-ran	Shared silver
2010	(South Korea) Kim Ja-in	(Japan) Akiyo Noguchi	(South Korea) Shin Woon-seon
2012	(South Korea) Kim Ja-in	(South Korea) Han Seu-ran	(China) Renqing Lamu
2013	(China) Renqing Lamu	(Kazakhstan) Yelena Grunyashina	(Kazakhstan) Tamara Kuznetsova
2014	(South Korea) Kim Ja-in	(Japan) Risa Ota	(Iran) Elnaz Rekabi
2015	(South Korea) Kim Ja-in	(Japan) Yuka Kobayashi	(Japan) Risa Ota
2016	(Japan) Akiyo Noguchi	(China) Renqing Lamu	(South Korea) Kim Ja-in
2017	(Japan) Aya Onoe	(Japan) Akiyo Noguchi	(Japan) Mei Kotake
2018	(South Korea) Kim Ja-in	(Japan) Akiyo Noguchi	(Japan) Mei Kotake
2019	(South Korea) Seo Chae-hyun	(Japan) Nanako Kura	(Indonesia) Ragil Rakasiwi Kharisma
2022	(South Korea) Seo Chae-hyun	(South Korea) Oh Ga-yeong	(South Korea) Kim Ja-in
2024	(Japan) Natsuki Tanii	(Japan) Mei Kotake	(Japan) Natsumi Oda
2026	(Japan) Ai Mori	(South Korea) Seo Chae-hyun	(Japan) Natsumi Oda

=== Bouldering ===
Year	Gold	Silver	Bronze
2001	(South Korea) Go Mi-sun	(South Korea) Kim Hyun-jung	(Hong Kong) Choi Shun Yuk
2006	(Japan) Akiyo Noguchi	(South Korea) Kim Ja-in	(Japan) Tomoko Ogawa
2007	(South Korea) Kim Ja-in	(Japan) Akiyo Noguchi	(China) Huang Liping
2008	(South Korea) Kim Ja-in	(Singapore) Beatrix Chong	(South Korea) Han Seu-ran
2009	(Japan) Akiyo Noguchi	(South Korea) Kim Ja-in	(South Korea) Kim In-kyoung
2010	(Japan) Akiyo Noguchi	(South Korea) Kim Ja-in	(South Korea) Shin Woon-seon
2012	(South Korea) Kim Ja-in	(China) Renqing Lamu	(Chinese Taipei) Lee Hung-ying
2013	(China) Renqing Lamu	(Iran) Elnaz Rekabi	(Kazakhstan) Tamara Kuznetsova
2014	(Japan) Miho Nonaka	(South Korea) Sa Sol	(Indonesia) Fitria Hartani
2015	(Japan) Miho Nonaka	(Japan) Akiyo Noguchi	(South Korea) Kim Ja-in
2016	(Japan) Akiyo Noguchi	(Japan) Aya Onoe	(Chinese Taipei) Lee Hung-ying
2017	(Japan) Akiyo Noguchi	(Japan) Aya Onoe	(Thailand) Puntarika Tunyavanich
2018	(Japan) Futaba Ito	(Japan) Nanako Kura	(Japan) Saki Kikuchi
2019	(South Korea) Seo Chae-hyun	(Japan) Nanako Kura	(Chinese Taipei) Lee Hung-ying
2022	(Japan) Futaba Ito	(China) Luo Zhilu	(South Korea) Seo Chae-hyun
2024	(Japan) Anon Matsufuji	(Japan) Miho Nonaka	(Japan) Futaba Ito
2026	(Japan) Ai Mori	(Japan) Melody Sekikawa	(Japan) Futaba Ito

=== Speed ===
Year	Gold	Silver	Bronze
2000	(Indonesia) Agung Ethi Hendrawati	(Indonesia) Yuyun Yuniar	(South Korea) Kim Hyun-jung
2001			
2002	(South Korea) Kim Joung-mi	(Hong Kong) Choi Shun Yuk	(China) Zhang Qing
2003	(Indonesia) Agung Ethi Hendrawati	(Indonesia) Evi Neliwati	(Indonesia) Yuyun Yuniar
2004	(Indonesia) Evi Neliwati	(Indonesia) Agung Ethi Hendrawati	(Hong Kong) Lisa Cheng
2005	(Indonesia) Agung Ethi Hendrawati	(Indonesia) Evi Neliwati	(Hong Kong) Lisa Cheng
2006	(Hong Kong) Lisa Cheng	(Singapore) Beatrix Chong	(Indonesia) Yuyun Yuniar
2007	(China) He Cuifang	(China) Li Chunhua	(China) Pan Xuhua
2008	(China) He Cuifang	(China) He Cuilian	(China) Li Chunhua
2009	(China) Li Chunhua	(China) He Cuifang	(Kazakhstan) Dinara Irsaliyeva
2010	(China) He Cuilian	(China) Wang Yang	(China) Li Chunhua
2012	(China) Wang Yang	(China) He Cuilian	(Kazakhstan) Tamara Kuznetsova
2013	(Iran) Farnaz Esmaeilzadeh	(Indonesia) Tita Supita	(Kazakhstan) Tamara Kuznetsova
2014	(Indonesia) Tita Supita	(Iran) Farnaz Esmaeilzadeh	(Indonesia) Mudji Mulyani
2015	(Indonesia) Tita Supita	(Kazakhstan) Tamara Kuznetsova	(Indonesia) Puji Lestari
2016	(China) He Cuilian	(Indonesia) Mudji Mulyani	(Indonesia) Tita Supita
2017	(Indonesia) Puji Lestari	(China) Song Yiling	(Indonesia) Aries Susanti Rahayu
2018	(Indonesia) Agustina Sari	(China) Song Yiling	(Indonesia) Aries Susanti Rahayu
2019	(Indonesia) Nurul Iqamah	(China) Tian Peiyang	(Indonesia) Rajiah Sallsabillah
2022	(Indonesia) Nurul Iqamah	(Indonesia) Desak Made Rita Kusuma Dewi	(Indonesia) Rajiah Sallsabillah
2024	(China) Meng Shixue	(Kazakhstan) Tamara Ulzhabayeva	(China) Zhou Yafei
2026	(Indonesia) Desak Made Rita Kusuma Dewi	(China) Zhou Yafei	(China) Qin Yumei

=== Speed Relay ===
Year	Gold	Silver	Bronze
2015	Indonesia; Puji Lestari; Ita Triana Purnamasari; Tita Supita	China; He Cuilian; Jiang Rong; Pubu Zhuoma	Singapore; Janice Ng; Judith Sim; Zhang Bin Bin
2016	Indonesia; Mudji Mulyani; Tita Supita; Santy Wellyanti	China; He Cuilian; Pubu Zhuoma; Renqing Lamu	Iran; Farnaz Esmaeilzadeh; Elnaz Rekabi; Sima Soltani
2017	Indonesia; Puji Lestari; Aries Susanti Rahayu; Santy Wellyanti	Indonesia; Fitriyani; Rajiah Sallsabillah; Dhorifatus Syafi'iyah	Iran; Farnaz Esmaeilzadeh; Azam Karami; Hadis Nazari
2019	Indonesia; Nurul Iqamah; Rajiah Sallsabillah; Amanda Narda Mutia	Indonesia; Dhorifatus Syafi'iyah; Mudji Mulyani; Berthdigna Devi	Kazakhstan; Assel Marienova; Tamara Ulzhabayeva; Margarita Agambayeva

=== Combined ===
Year	Gold	Silver	Bronze
2018	(Japan) Akiyo Noguchi	(Japan) Miho Nonaka	(Japan) Futaba Ito
2019	(Indonesia) Nurul Iqamah	(Japan) Nanako Kura	(Chinese Taipei) Lee Hung-ying
2022	(South Korea) Seo Chae-hyun	(Japan) Natsuki Tanii	(Japan) Futaba Ito
