= Haddan Malik Baqmuhyibar =

Indonesian speed climber

Personal information
- Nickname: Haddan
- Years active: 2024–present

Sport
- Country: Indonesia
- Sport: Competition climbing
- Event: Speed climbing
- Coached by: Amri
Medal record
Men's competition climbing
Representing Indonesia
World Climbing Youth Championship
Silver medal – second place	2026 Arco	U19 men's speed
World Climbing Asia Youth Championship
Gold medal – first place	2024 Jamshedpur	Youth B men's speed
Gold medal – first place	2025 Guiyang	U17 men's speed

Haddan Malik Baqmuhyibar is an Indonesian competition climber who specializes in speed climbing. He won the men's speed title at the 2024 and 2025 Asian Youth Championships, competing in the Youth B and U17 categories, respectively. In 2026, he won the silver medal in U19 men's speed event at the World Climbing Youth Championship in Arco, Italy.

== Career ==
=== Youth career ===
In November 2024, Haddan competed at the IFSC Youth Asian Championships in Jamshedpur, India. He won the Youth B men's speed event, ahead of Japan's Sota Saito and Miyuki Ishida. The victory was his first international title.

At the 2025 IFSC Youth Asian Championships in Guiyang, China, Haddan won the U17 men's speed event. He advanced to the final against Chinese climber Zhao Yicheng, whose false start resulted in Haddan being awarded the gold medal. Indonesia also won two bronze medals at the championship.

In March 2026, Haddan was selected for Indonesia's national sport-climbing training programme as a member of the men's speed squad. The federation's roster associated him with Central Java.

In July 2026, Haddan competed in the U19 men's speed event at the World Climbing Youth Championship in Arco. He reached the final against China's Yanze Shi. Both climbers slipped near the top of the route, with Shi winning in 6.07 seconds ahead of Haddan's 6.21. The Indonesian Climbing Federation selected Haddan to compete in this championship to increase his international experience before progressing further into senior competition.

== Achievements ==
=== World Climbing Youth Championship ===
Speed • U19 Men

Year	Venue	Opponent	Time (s)	Result	Ref
2026	Arco, Italy	(China) Yanze Shi	6.21–6.07	(silver) Silver	

=== Asian Youth Championships ===
Speed • Youth B Male

Year	Venue	Opponent	Time (s)	Result	Ref
2024	Jamshedpur, India	(Japan) Sota Saito	7.31–15.14	(gold) Gold	

Speed • U17 Men

Year	Venue	Opponent	Time (s)	Result	Ref
2025	Guiyang, China	(China) Zhao Yicheng	wc–fs	(gold) Gold	
