= Raharjati Nursamsa =

Indonesian speed climber

Personal information
- Nicknames: Raharjati, Ujang
- Born: 8 January 2001 (age 25) Sumedang, West Java, Indonesia
- Height: 1.63 m (5 ft 4 in)

Sport
- Country: Indonesia
- Sport: Competition climbing
- Event: Speed climbing
Medal record
Men's competition climbing
Representing China
World Series (Overall)
Third place	2026	Speed
Asian Beach Games
Silver medal – second place	2026 Sanya	Speed relay

Raharjati Nursamsa (born 8 January 2001) is an Indonesian competition climber who specialized in speed climbing. He has won multiple medals on the international climbing circuit, including gold medals at the 2023 IFSC Climbing World Cup in Jakarta, Indonesia and the 2025 IFSC Climbing World Cup in Kraków, Poland.

== Career ==
In May 2023, Nursamsa won his first IFSC Climbing World Cup title in the men's speed event in Jakarta, Indonesia. He defeated China's Wang Xinshang in the final, recording a time of 5.11 seconds against Wang's 5.14 seconds. Following the victory, Nursamsa stated that one of his ambitions was to break the men's speed-climbing world record.

Later that season, he won the bronze medal in the men's speed event at the World Cup in Chamonix, France. His official results also show that he participated in the 2024 Olympic Qualifier Series events in Shanghai and Budapest but did not qualify for the 2024 Summer Olympics.

In July 2025, Nursamsa won his second World Cup gold medal at the IFSC Climbing World Cup in Kraków, Poland. He defeated fellow Indonesian climber Kiromal Katibin in the final and recorded a personal-best time of 4.73 seconds. Indonesia won both speed titles at the event, with Desak Made Rita Kusuma Dewi winning the women's competition.

At the 2026 Asian Beach Games in Sanya, China, Nursamsa and Antasyafi Robby Al Hilmi won the silver medal in the men's speed relay event. In July 2026, he won a bronze medal in the men's individual speed event at the World Climbing Series in Kraków.

== Achievements ==
=== World Climbing Series ===
Men's speed

Year	Venue	Opponent	Time (s)	Result	Ref
2023	Jakarta, Indonesia	(China) Wang Xinshang	5.11–5.14	(gold) Gold	
2023	Chamonix, France	(Japan) Jun Yasukawa	5.323–5.324	(bronze) Bronze	
2025	Kraków, Poland	(Indonesia) Kiromal Katibin	4.73–fall	(gold) Gold	
2026	Kraków, Poland	(China) Shouhong Chu	4.79–4.80	(bronze) Bronze	

Mixed speed relay

Year	Venue	Partner	Opponent	Time (s)	Result	Ref
2026	Guiyang, China	(Indonesia) Rajiah Sallsabillah	(China) Zhang Mengli (China) Zhou Ziyu	11.35–14.85	(gold) Gold	

=== Asian Beach Games ===
Men's speed relay

Year	Venue	Partner	Opponent	Time (s)	Result	Ref
2026	Sanya, China	(Indonesia) Antasyafi Robby Al Hilmi	(China) Long Jianguo (China) Zhao Yicheng	9.80–9.75	(silver) Silver	

== Rankings ==
=== IFSC Climbing World Cup ===
Discipline	2022	2023	2024	2025
Speed	31	12	40	8

== Number of medals in the Climbing World Cup ==
=== Speed ===
Season	Gold	Silver	Bronze	Total
2023	1		1	2
2024				
2025	1			1
2026			1	1
Total	2	0	2	4
