= Antasyafi Robby Al Hilmi =

Indonesian speed climber (born 2007)

Personal information
- Nickname: Robby
- Nationality: Indonesian
- Born: 28 June 2007 (age 19) Gresik, East Java, Indonesia
- Height: 1.68 m (5 ft 6 in)

Sport
- Country: Indonesia
- Sport: Competition climbing
- Event: Speed climbing
Medal record
Men's competition climbing
Representing Indonesia
Asian Beach Games
Silver medal – second place	2026 Sanya	Speed
Silver medal – second place	2026 Sanya	Speed relay
SEA Games
Gold medal – first place	2025 Thailand	Speed

Antasyafi Robby Al Hilmi (born 28 June 2007) is an Indonesian competition speed climber. He won the men's speed gold medal at the 2025 SEA Games and later earned silver medals at the 2026 Asian Beach Games, and two events of the 2026 World Climbing Series, in Madrid, Spain and Chamonix, France.

== Career ==
=== Youth career ===
Robby began appearing in international competition records in 2024. That year, he represented Indonesia at the IFSC Climbing Youth World Championships in Guiyang, China, where he placed fourth. The Indonesian Climbing Federation listed him as an athlete representing East Java in its national youth delegation.

In November 2024, Robby won the Youth A men's speed title at the Asian Youth Championships in Jamshedpur, India. He continued competing at youth and senior levels during the following season.

In June 2025, he represented Jakarta at the Indonesian National Youth Climbing Championships in Tangerang, Banten. He won the junior men's speed event with a time of 5.407 seconds. At the time, he was already part of Indonesia's national training programme and stated that he hoped to compete more at world-level events and eventually at the Olympic Games.

Robby won the bronze medal in the under-19 men's speed competition at the 2025 IFSC Youth Asian Championships in Guiyang. He also competed in several senior international events during the season, including World Cup competitions in Bali, Kraków, Chamonix, and Guiyang.

=== Senior career ===
In December 2025, Robby won the men's speed classic event at the SEA Games in Thailand. He recorded 4.83 seconds in the final, defeating fellow Indonesian climber Alfian Muhammad Fajri, who recorded 5.08 seconds. The result gave Robby his first SEA Games gold medal.

In May 2026, Robby reached the men's speed final at the World Climbing Series event held in Alcobendas, Spain. He finished second after recording 4.81 seconds in the final, while China's Shouhong Chu won with 4.75 seconds.

At the World Climbing Series in Kraków in July 2026, Robby partnered Desak Made Rita Kusuma Dewi in the mixed speed relay. They recorded 11.48 seconds during qualification, establishing the first Asian record in the newly introduced event, and went on to win the silver medal.

Later that month, Robby won his third silver medal of the 2026 World Climbing Series at Chamonix, France. He faced fellow Indonesian Veddriq Leonardo in the final. Leonardo won with a time of 4.89 seconds, while Antasyafi recorded 5.11 seconds.

== Achievements ==
=== World Climbing Series ===
Men's speed

Year	Venue	Opponent	Time (s)	Result	Ref
2026	Madrid, Spain	(China) Shouhong Chu	4.81–4.75	(silver) Silver	
2026	Chamonix, France	(Indonesia) Veddriq Leonardo	5.11–4.89	(silver) Silver	
2026	Guiyang, China	(China) Ling Yongzhi	4.65 –4.75	(gold) Gold	

Mixed speed relay

Year	Venue	Partner	Opponent	Time (s)	Result	Ref
2026	Kraków, Poland	(Indonesia) Desak Made Rita Kusuma Dewi	(United States) Samuel Watson (United States) Emma Hunt	11.30–10.89	(silver) Silver	

=== Asian Youth Championships ===
Speed • Youth A Male

Year	Venue	Opponent	Time (s)	Result	Ref
2024	Jamshedpur, India	(Kazakhstan) Damir Toktarov	5.20–5.39	(gold) Gold	

Speed • U19 Men

Year	Venue	Opponent	Time (s)	Result	Ref
2025	Guiyang, China	(Kazakhstan) Damir Toktarov	5.31–7.00	(bronze) Bronze	

=== Asian Beach Games ===
Men's speed

Year	Venue	Opponent	Time (s)	Result	Ref
2026	Sanya, China	(China) Zhao Yicheng	fs-wc	(silver) Silver	

Men's speed relay

Year	Venue	Partner	Opponent	Time (s)	Result	Ref
2026	Sanya, China	(Indonesia) Raharjati Nursamsa	(China) Long Jianguo (China) Zhao Yicheng	9.80–9.75	(silver) Silver	

=== SEA Games ===
Men's speed

Year	Venue	Opponent	Time (s)	Result	Ref
2025	Bangkok, Thailand	(Indonesia) Alfian Muhammad Fajri	4.83–5.08	(gold) Gold	
