= 2023 IFSC Climbing World Youth Championships =

Competition climbing event

2023 IFSC Climbing World Championships
- Venue: Seoul Mountain Climbing & Culture Center
- Location: Seoul, South Korea
- Date: 18–27 August 2023
- Website: Seoul 2023

The 2023 IFSC Climbing World Youth Championships (32nd), was held in Seoul, South Korea from 18 to 27 August 2023. The competition climbing championships consisted of lead, speed, and bouldering events, for the under 20, under 18, and under 16 age categories.

== Medal table ==
* Host nation (South Korea)

Rank	Nation	Gold	Silver	Bronze	Total
1	Japan	6	7	7	20
2	China	2	2	3	7
3	South Korea*	2	2	0	4
4	United States	2	1	1	4
5	France	2	0	2	4
6	Slovenia	1	2	0	3
7	Ukraine	1	1	0	2
8	Belgium	1	0	1	2
9	New Zealand	1	0	0	1
10	Spain	0	1	2	3
11	Germany	0	1	0	1
11	Poland	0	1	0	1
13	Great Britain	0	0	1	1
13	Thailand	0	0	1	1
Totals (14 entries)		18	18	18	54

== Medalists ==
=== Male ===
Event	Gold	Silver	Bronze
Junior (Under 20)
Lead	Hannes Van Duysen; Belgium	Neo Suzuki; Japan	Zento Murashita; Japan
Bouldering	Junta Sekiguchi; Japan	Yannick Nagel; Germany	Hannes Van Duysen; Belgium
Speed	Julian David; New Zealand	Micah Feller; United States	Rafe Stokes; Great Britain
Youth A (Under 18)
Lead	Kwon Ki-beom; South Korea	Shion Omata; Japan	Auswin Aueareechit; Thailand
Bouldering	Ritsu Kayotani; Japan	Raito Kato; Japan	Thomas Lemagner; France
Speed	Michael Hom; United States	Kim Dong-jun; South Korea	Kazuki Tanii; Japan
Youth B (Under 16)
Lead	Ryusei Hamada; Japan	Hareru Nagamori; Japan	Ryota Toda; Japan
Bouldering	Noh Hyun-seung; South Korea	Ryusei Hamada; Japan	Hareru Nagamori; Japan
Speed	Zhao Yicheng; China	Xu Jianxun; China	Yu Zexuan; China

=== Female ===
Event	Gold	Silver	Bronze
Junior (Under 20)
Lead	Sara Čopar; Slovenia	Tomona Takao; Japan	Sana Ogura; Japan
Bouldering	Selma Elhadj Mimoune; France	Sara Čopar; Slovenia	Iziar Martínez Almendros; Spain
Speed	Karin Hayashi; Japan	Maria Szwed; Poland	Callie Close; United States
Youth A (Under 18)
Lead	Meije Lerondel; France	Kim Chae-yeong; South Korea	Moka Mochizuki; Japan
Bouldering	Kaho Murakoshi; Japan	Jennifer Buckley; Slovenia	Lily Abriat; France
Speed	Zhang Tianxiang; China	Kseniia Horielova; Ukraine	Yang Feiyan; China
Youth B (Under 16)
Lead	Natsumi Oda; Japan	Kohana Mugishima; Japan	Geila Macià Martín; Spain
Bouldering	Analise Van Hoang; United States	Geila Macià Martín; Spain	Natsumi Oda; Japan
Speed	Polina Khalkevych; Ukraine	Huang Xinyi; China	Lin Jiayi; China
