= 2025 IFSC Climbing World Youth Championships =

Competition climbing event

2025 IFSC Youth World Championships
- Venue: Helsingin Kiipeilykeskus
- Location: Helsinki, Finland
- Date: 28 July-3 August 2025

The 2025 IFSC Climbing World Youth Championships (34th), was held in Helsinki, Finland from 28 July to 3 August 2025. The competition climbing championships consisted of lead, speed, and bouldering events, for the under 19 and under 17 age categories.

== Medal table ==
* Host nation (Finland)

Rank	Nation	Gold	Silver	Bronze	Total
1	Japan	5	2	5	12
2	China	3	3	2	8
3	Spain	1	1	0	2
3	United States	1	1	0	2
5	Germany	1	0	0	1
5	Ukraine	1	0	0	1
7	France	0	1	3	4
8	Czech Republic	0	1	0	1
8	Italy	0	1	0	1
8	Serbia	0	1	0	1
8	Slovenia	0	1	0	1
12	South Korea	0	0	1	1
12	Thailand	0	0	1	1
Totals (13 entries)		12	12	12	36

== Medalists ==
=== Male ===
Event	Gold	Silver	Bronze
Under 19
Lead	Manato Kurashiki; Japan	Lukas Mokrolusky; Czech Republic	Hareru Nagamori; Japan
Bouldering	Kodai Yamada; Japan	Samuel Richard; France	Auswin Aueareechit; Thailand
Speed	Aodhan Umlauf; Germany	Francesco Ponzinibio; Italy	Paco Lehmann; France
Under 17
Lead	Ryusei Hamada; Japan	Kazuki Nakata; Japan	Jungbin Choi; South Korea
Bouldering	Ryusei Hamada; Japan	Taketo Saiki; Japan	Soran Koyama; Japan
Speed	Zhao Yicheng; China	Yu Zexuan; China	Sota Saito; Japan

=== Female ===
Event	Gold	Silver	Bronze
Under 19
Lead	Geila Macià; Spain	Lana Goric; Slovenia	Louise Puech Yazid; France
Bouldering	Kaho Murakoshi; Japan	Geila Macià; Spain	Manami Yama; Japan
Speed	Meng Shixue; China	Wang Yuting; China	Bai Yumei; China
Under 17
Lead	Rafael Kazbekova; Ukraine	Milena Casetta; Serbia	Arisa Hayashi; Japan
Bouldering	Li Meini; China	Lucy Duncan; United States	Lou Auclair; France
Speed	Evie Albrecht; United States	Tang Jiaxin; China	Wang Chunyouxuan; China
