= 2022 IFSC Climbing World Youth Championships =

Competition climbing event

2022 IFSC Climbing World Championships
- Venue: Movement The Hill
- Location: (United States) Dallas
- Date: 18–27 August 2023

The 2022 IFSC Climbing World Youth Championships (31st), was held in Dallas, United States of America from 22 to 31 August 2022. The competition climbing championships consisted of lead, speed, and bouldering events, for the under 20, under 18, and under 16 age categories.

== Medal table ==
* Host nation (United States)

| Rank | Nation | Gold | Silver | Bronze | Total |
|---|---|---|---|---|---|
| 1 | Japan | 5 | 7 | 7 | 19 |
| 2 | France | 3 | 3 | 1 | 7 |
| 3 | Italy | 3 | 2 | 1 | 6 |
| 4 | United States* | 2 | 0 | 2 | 4 |
| 5 | Ukraine | 1 | 2 | 0 | 3 |
| 6 | Slovenia | 1 | 1 | 1 | 3 |
| 7 | South Korea | 1 | 0 | 1 | 2 |
| 8 | Belgium | 1 | 0 | 0 | 1 |
| 8 | Bulgaria | 1 | 0 | 0 | 1 |
| 10 | Great Britain | 0 | 2 | 0 | 2 |
| 11 | Germany | 0 | 1 | 2 | 3 |
| 12 | Czech Republic | 0 | 0 | 2 | 2 |
| 13 | Kazakhstan | 0 | 0 | 1 | 1 |
| Totals (13 entries) | | 18 | 18 | 18 | 54 |

== Medalists ==
=== Male ===
| Event | Gold | Silver | Bronze |
Junior (Under 20)
| Lead | Zento Murashita; Japan | Junta Sekiguchi; Japan | Lovro Crep; Slovenia |
| Bouldering | Hannes Van Duysen; Belgium | Zento Murashita; Japan | Junta Sekiguchi; Japan |
| Speed | Shuto Fujino; Japan | Hryhorii Ilchyshyn; Ukraine | Leander Carmanns; Germany |
Youth A (Under 18)
| Lead | Sorato Anraku; Japan | Toby Roberts; Great Britain | Rikuto Inohana; Japan |
| Bouldering | Ritsu Kayotani; Japan | Toby Roberts; Great Britain | Sorato Anraku; Japan |
| Speed | Marco Rontini; Italy | Marius Payet Gaboriaud; France | Samuel Watson; United States |
Youth B (Under 16)
| Lead | Max Bertone; France | Riku Ishihara; Japan | Lukas Mokrolusky; Czech Republic |
| Bouldering | Hugo Hoyer; United States | Matteo Reusa; Italy | Hinata Terakawa; Japan |
| Speed | Francesco Ponzinibio; Italy | Ginta Uegaki; Japan | Damir Toktarov; Kazakhstan |

=== Female ===
| Event | Gold | Silver | Bronze |
Junior (Under 20)
| Lead | Nonoha Kume; Japan | Natsuki Tanii; Japan | Michaela Smetanova; Czech Republic |
| Bouldering | Zélia Avezou; France | Selma Elhadj Mimoune; France | Kylie Cullen; United States |
| Speed | Beatrice Colli; Italy | Nuria Brockfeld; Germany | Franziska Ritter; Germany |
Youth A (Under 18)
| Lead | Aleksandra Totkova; Bulgaria | Sara Copar; Slovenia | Oh Gayeong; South Korea |
| Bouldering | Sara Copar; Slovenia | Michika Nagashima; Japan | Alessia Mabboni; Italy |
| Speed | Manon Lebon; France | Sofia Bellesini; Italy | Ai Takeuchi; Japan |
Youth B (Under 16)
| Lead | Kim Chaeyeong; South Korea | Meije Lerondel; France | Kaho Murakoshi; Japan |
| Bouldering | Anastasia Sanders; United States | Natsumi Oda; Japan | Kaho Murakoshi; Japan |
| Speed | Kseniia Horielova; Ukraine | Polina Khalkevych; Ukraine | Maelane Villedieu; France |
