= 2024 IFSC Climbing World Youth Championships =

Competition climbing event

2024 IFSC Climbing World Championships
- Venue: Qingzhen Sports Training Base
- Location: Guiyang, China
- Date: 22–31 August 2024
- Website: Guiyang 2024

The 2024 IFSC Climbing World Youth Championships (33rd), was held in Guiyang, China from 22 to 31 August 2024. The competition climbing championships consisted of lead, speed, and bouldering events, for the under 20, under 18, and under 16 age categories.

== Medal table ==
* Host nation (China)

Rank	Nation	Gold	Silver	Bronze	Total
1	Japan	6	2	5	13
2	China*	5	5	3	13
3	Slovenia	3	0	0	3
4	France	2	0	0	2
5	South Korea	1	4	1	6
6	Italy	1	0	0	1
7	Ukraine	0	2	0	2
8	Austria	0	1	1	2
8	Germany	0	1	1	2
10	Poland	0	1	0	1
10	Romania	0	1	0	1
10	United States	0	1	0	1
13	Spain	0	0	2	2
14	Belgium	0	0	1	1
14	Bulgaria	0	0	1	1
14	Indonesia	0	0	1	1
14	Switzerland	0	0	1	1
14	Thailand	0	0	1	1
Totals (18 entries)		18	18	18	54

== Medalists ==
=== Male ===
Event	Gold	Silver	Bronze
Junior (Under 20)
Lead	Yusuke Sugimoto; Japan	Darius Râpă; Romania	Shion Omata; Japan
Bouldering	Ritsu Kayotani; Japan	Yannick Nagel; Germany	Slav Kirov; Bulgaria
Speed	Jérôme Morel; France	Oskar Szalecki; Poland	Zhou Ziyu; China
Youth A (Under 18)
Lead	Manato Kurashiki; Japan	Lee Hak-jin; South Korea	Haru Funaki; Japan
Bouldering	Hareru Nagamori; Japan	Park Beom-jin; South Korea	Corentin Laporte; Belgium
Speed	Chu Shouhong; China	Michael Hom; United States	Motonori Tabuchi; Japan
Youth B (Under 16)
Lead	Jung Chan-jin; South Korea	Ryusei Hamada; Japan	Park Tae-saung; South Korea
Bouldering	Ryusei Hamada; Japan	Chanjin Jung; South Korea	Kazuki Nakata; Japan
Speed	Yicheng Zhao; China	Yang Li; China	Zexuan Yu; China

=== Female ===
Event	Gold	Silver	Bronze
Junior (Under 20)
Lead	Rosa Rekar; Slovenia	Anastasiia Kobets; Ukraine	Magdalena Kompein; Austria
Bouldering	Lily Abriat; France	Anastasiia Kobets; Ukraine	Anna Maria Apel; Germany
Speed	Mou Yuju; China	Zhang Tianxiang; China	Berliana Puteri Wijaya; Indonesia
Youth A (Under 18)
Lead	Jennifer Buckley; Slovenia	Flora Oblasser; Austria	Geila Macià; Spain
Bouldering	Jennifer Buckley; Slovenia	Kaho Murakoshi; Japan	Geila Macià; Spain
Speed	Meng Shixue; China	Yang Feiyan; China	Huang Xinyi; China
Youth B (Under 16)
Lead	Arisa Hayashi; Japan	Yu Chenxuan; China	Julia Rasmussen; Switzerland
Bouldering	Li Meini; China	Gyurin Kim; South Korea	Waka Murakami; Japan
Speed	Alice Marcelli; Italy	Chunyouxuan Wang; China	Ratchamon Thongbai; Thailand
