= Arisa Hayashi =

Japanese rock climber

Personal information
- Nationality: Japan
- Born: 2010

Climbing career
- Type of climber: Competition climbing
Medal record
World Youth Championships
Gold medal – first place	2024 Guiyang	Youth B Lead
Bronze medal – third place	2025 Helsinki	U19 Lead
Asian Youth Championships
Gold medal – first place	2024 Jamshedpur	U16 Lead

Arisa Hayashi (林 有沙, Hayashi Arisa) is a Japanese rock climber who specializes in competition climbing.

In August 2024, She won gold medal in the lead climbing event at the IFSC Climbing World Youth Championships. In November 2024, She won gold medal in the lead event at the IFSC Climbing Asian Youth Championships.
