= Zhao Yicheng =

Chinese speed climber (born 2009)

Personal information
- Born: 8 June 2009 (age 17)
- Years active: 2023–present

Climbing career
- Type of climber: Competition speed climbing
Medal record
Men's competition climbing
Representing China
World Series (Overall)
Winner	2026	Speed
Asian Beach Games
Gold medal – first place	2026 Sanya	Speed
Gold medal – first place	2026 Sanya	Speed relay
World Youth Championships
Gold medal – first place	2023 Seoul	Speed
Gold medal – first place	2024 Guiyang	Speed
Gold medal – first place	2025 Helsinki	Speed

Zhao Yicheng (born 8 June 2009) is a Chinese competition speed climber. He is a three-time World Climbing Youth Championship gold medalist and world record holder.

== Career ==
Zhao made his World Climbing Youth Championship debut in 2023 and won a gold medal in the Youth B category. He again won a gold medal in the Youth B category at the 2024 IFSC Climbing World Youth Championships. During the 2025 IFSC Climbing World Youth Championships he won a gold medal in the under-17 category with a time of 4.85 seconds.

In April 2026, he represented China at the 2026 Asian Beach Games and won a gold medal in the men's individual speed climbing event. In the gold medal contest, Zhao secured the victory after Indonesia’s Antasyafi Robby Al Hilmi was disqualified due to a false start. During qualification he set a world record time of 4.58 seconds, surpassing the previous record of 4.64 seconds held by Sam Watson. Zhao and Al Hilmi also met in the final of the men's relay event, paired with Long Jianguo and Raharjati Nursamsa respectively. Unlike in the individual event, both teams raced to a proper conclusion, with China beating Indonesia and also setting a world record of 9.75 seconds in the process.

In May 2026, he competed at the 2026 World Climbing Series in Wujiang, Suzhou, and won a gold medal. During the semifinals he broke his own world record with a time of 4.54 seconds, surpassing the record he set the month before at the Asian Beach Games.
