= China at the 2025 World Games =

- IOC code: CHN
- NOC: Chinese Olympic Committee

in Chengdu, China 7 August 2025 – 17 August 2025
- Competitors: 320 (156 men and 164 women) in 28 sports
- Medals Ranked 1st: Gold 36 Silver 17 Bronze 11 Total 64

World Games appearances
- 1981; 1985; 1989; 1993; 1997; 2001; 2005; 2009; 2013; 2017; 2022; 2025

China competed as host country at the 2025 World Games held in Chengdu, China from 7 to 17 August 2025. Athletes representing China won 36 gold medals, 17 silver medals and 11 bronze medals. The country finished in first place in the medal table.

== Competitors ==
The following is the list of number of competitors in the Games.

Sport	Men	Women	Total
Air sports	1	2	3
Archery	4	4	8
Beach handball	10	10	20
Billiards	7	5	12
Boules sports	2	2	4
Canoe sports	14	14	28
Cheerleading	3	1	4
Dancesport	9	9	18
Duathlon	2	1	3
Flag football	0	12	12
Floorball	14	0	14
Flying disc	8	8	16
Gymnastics	12	11	23
Ju-jitsu	4	0	4
Karate	5	6	11
Kickboxing	2	3	5
Korfball	10	10	20
Lacrosse	0	12	12
Muaythai	3	3	6
Orienteering	2	2	4
Powerboating	4	4	8
Roller sports	19	5	24
Softball	0	15	15
Sport climbing	4	4	8
Squash	5	6	11
Underwater sports	6	8	14
Wakeboarding	4	3	7
Wushu	2	4	6
Total	156	164	320

== Medalists ==
Medal	Name	Sport	Event	Date
Gold	Lu Zhuoling	Wushu	Women's taijiquan/taijijian	8 August
Gold	Gao Jiushang	Wushu	Men's changquan/daoshu/gunshu	9 August
Gold	Gong Li	Karate	Women's kumite 61 kg	9 August
Gold	Ding Wenyan; Gu Quanjia; Ma Yixing	Acrobatic gymnastics	Women's group	9 August
Gold	Long Dengxi	Freediving	Men's dynamic without fins FFS1-FFS2	10 August
Gold	Huang Shiyu	Freediving	Women's dynamic with fins FFS1-FFS2	10 August
Gold	Xu Lu	Wakeboarding	Women's freestyle	10 August
Gold	Shu Chengjing; Xu Yichuan; Xie Wenmin; Hu Yaoyao	Finswimming	Women's 4 x 100 m surface relay	10 August
Gold	Lu Xiaohui	Muaythai	Women's 48 kg	10 August
Gold	Han Xin	Muaythai	Women's 60 kg	10 August
Gold	Hu Yicheng; Zhang Xinxin	Trampoline gymnastics	Women's synchronized	10 August
Gold	Long Dengxi	Freediving	Men's dynamic with fins FFS1-FFS2	11 August
Gold	Huang Jingqiu	Freediving	Women's dynamic without fins FFS1-FFS2	11 August
Gold	Shu Chengjing; Xu Yichuan; Xie Wenmin; Hu Yaoyao	Finswimming	Women's 4 x 50 m surface relay	11 August
Gold	Li Yucai; Guo Ao	Ju-jitsu	Mixed duo para physical	12 August
Gold	Tang Sishuo	Wushu	Men's 56 kg	12 August
Gold	Chen Mengyue	Wushu	Women's 52 kg	12 August
Gold	Li Zhiqin	Wushu	Women's 60 kg	12 August
Gold	Bai Yulu	Billiards	Women's 6-reds snooker	13 August
Gold	Shang Chunsong	Parkour	Women's freestyle	13 August
Gold	Han Yu	Billiards	Women's pool	13 August
Gold	Zhang Taiyi	Billiards	Mixed heyball pool	14 August
Gold	Chu Shouhong	Sport climbing	Men's speed single	14 August
Gold	Deng Lijuan	Sport climbing	Women's speed single	14 August
Gold	Xiao Guodong	Billiards	Men's 15-reds snooker	14 August
Gold	Long Jianguo	Sport climbing	Men's speed single 4	15 August
Gold	Fan Siwei; Feng Lei; Liang Wenjie; Teng Hao; Xu Tong	Aerobic gymnastics	Groups	15 August
Gold	Zhang Hao	Freestyle inline skating	Men's speed slalom	16 August
Gold	Chu Shouhong; Long Jianguo	Sport climbing	Men's speed relay	16 August
Gold	Deng Lijuan; Zhou Yafei	Sport climbing	Women's speed relay	16 August
Gold	Fan Siwei; Zhang Qingzhou; Wang Zhenhao	Aerobic gymnastics	Trios	16 August
Gold	Zhang Hao	Freestyle inline skating	Men's classic slalom	17 August
Gold	Zhu Siyi	Freestyle inline skating	Women's classic slalom	17 August
Gold	Wang Chenyi	Boules sports	Women's lyonnaise progressive shooting	17 August
Gold	Qi Xiangyu (Lithe-Ing)	Dancesport	B-Boys	17 August
Gold	Guo Pu (Royal)	Dancesport	B-Girls	17 August
Silver	Peng Chun; Zhang Peng; Ji Shengchang; Dong Binrui; Wu Shuhan; Zeng Bolun; Wabu Youzhuacier; Xu Jiayu; Luo Meng; Wang Shougang	Dragon boat	Open 8-seater 2000 m	9 August
Silver	Peng Chun; Zhang Peng; Ji Shengchang; Dong Binrui; Wu Shuhan; Zeng Bolun; Wabu Youzhuacier; Xu Jiayu; Luo Meng; Wang Shougang; Wu Siqi; Yang Jie	Dragon boat	Mixed 10-seater 200 m	10 August
Silver	Zhuang Tiancai	Wakeboarding	Men's skim	10 August
Silver	Hu Yaoyao	Finswimming	Women's 100 m surface	11 August
Silver	Pan Tianyou; Wang Wenqiang	Ju-jitsu	Mixed duo para visual	12 August
Silver	Zhu Hailan	Wushu	Women's 70 kg	12 August
Silver	Qin Yumei	Sport climbing	Women's speed single	14 August
Silver	Zhang Xiaohui; Wang Chenyi	Boules sports	Mixed lyonnaise quick shooting doubles	15 August
Silver	Qin Yumei	Sport climbing	Women's speed single 4	15 August
Silver	Zhu Siyi	Freestyle inline skating	Women's speed slalom	16 August
Silver	Yan Linlin	Boules sports	Women's petanque precision shooting	16 August
Silver	Fu Yu	Freestyle inline skating	Men's speed slalom	16 August
Silver	Qin Yumei; Zhang Shaoqin	Sport climbing	Women's speed relay	16 August
Silver	Liu Jiaxin	Freestyle inline skating	Women's classic slalom	17 August
Silver	Zhang Maozhu	Powerboating	Men's motosurf single	17 August
Silver	Gao Jiayin	Powerboating	Women's motosurf single	17 August
Silver	Liu Qingyi (671)	Dancesport	B-Girls	17 August
Bronze	Zhang Chengcheng	Muaythai	Men's 86 kg	10 August
Bronze	Zhang Siqian	Finswimming	Men's 50 m apnoea	11 August
Bronze	Liu Shasha	Billiards	Women's pool	13 August
Bronze	Zhang Taiyi	Billiards	Mixed heyball pool	13 August
Bronze	Long Jianguo	Sport climbing	Men's speed single	14 August
Bronze	Zhang Zhenhai	Track speed skating	Men's 500 m sprint + distance	14 August
Bronze	Zhou Yafei	Sport climbing	Women's speed single	14 August
Bronze	Wen Jingjing	Freestyle inline skating	Women's speed slalom	16 August
Bronze	Liang Weijun; He Yushu; Chen Hongji; Tuo Shuyi; Huang Chengkai; Teng Hao; Zhang Qingzhou; Xu Tong	Aerobic gymnastics	Aerobic dance	16 August
Bronze	Wang Yuxuan	Freestyle inline skating	Men's classic slalom	17 August
Bronze	Feng Zhanghao	Powerboating	Men's motosurf single	17 August

Medals by sport
Sport	1st place, gold medalist(s)	2nd place, silver medalist(s)	3rd place, bronze medalist(s)	Total
Sport climbing	5	3	2	10
Wushu	5	1	0	6
Billiard sports	4	0	2	6
Freediving	4	0	0	4
Freestyle inline skating	3	3	2	8
Finswimming	2	1	1	4
Dancesport	2	1	0	3
Aerobic gymnastics	2	0	1	3
Muaythai	2	0	1	3
Boules sports	1	2	0	3
Ju-jitsu	1	1	0	2
Wakeboarding	1	1	0	2
Acrobatic gymnastics	1	0	0	1
Karate	1	0	0	1
Parkour	1	0	0	1
Trampoline gymnastics	1	0	0	1
Powerboating	0	2	1	3
Dragon boat	0	2	0	2
Track speed skating	0	0	1	1
Total	36	17	11	64

== Archery ==
Barebow/recurve

Athlete	Event	Qualification		Elimination 1	Elimination 2	Elimination 3	Elimination 4	Semifinal	Final / BM	
Athlete	Event	Score	Rank	Opposition Result	Opposition Result	Opposition Result	Opposition Result	Opposition Result	Opposition Result	Rank
Jingxuan Cui	Men's recurve	357	7	Bye	Daman (BEL); W 80–77	Mulot (FRA); W 85–87	Bakker (NED); L 88–87	Did not advance		
Yuning Bao	Women's recurve	328	11	Lloyd (AUS); W 69–85	Brug (CAN); L 79–79	Did not advance				

== Beach handball ==
China qualified as hosts for both the men's and women's tournament.

Team	Event	Preliminary round				Quarterfinal	Semifinal	Final / BM / PM	
Team	Event	Opposition Result	Opposition Result	Opposition Result	Rank	Opposition Result	Opposition Result	Opposition Result	Rank
China men's	Men's tournament	Tunisia; L 0–2	Spain; L 0–2	Denmark; L 2–0	4	Brazil; L 2–0	Consolation semifinal Denmark; L 0–2	7th place game Tunisia; L 2–1	8
China women's	Women's tournament	Croatia; W 2–1	Portugal; L 2–0	Argentina; L 2–0	3	Germany; L 2–0	Consolation semifinal Croatia; W 2–0	5th place game Portugal; L 2–0	6

== Flag football ==
Women

Team	Event	Group play				Quarterfinals	Semifinal	Final / BM	
Team	Event	Opposition Result	Opposition Result	Opposition Result	Rank	Opposition Result	Opposition Result	Opposition Result	Rank
China women	Women's tournament	Austria; L 45–47	Canada; L 48–12	United States; L 39–12	4	Mexico; L 40–0	Consolation Semifinals; Japan; W 28–22	5th place game Great Britain; L 34–13	6

== Floorball ==
Summary

Team	Event	Preliminary round				Semifinal	Final / BM / PF	
Team	Event	Opposition Result	Opposition Result	Opposition Result	Rank	Opposition Result	Opposition Result	Rank
China men	Men's tournament	Finland; L 0–42	Czech Republic; L 36–0	Canada; L 15–1	4	Did not advance	7th place match Philippines; L 14–0	8

== Gymnastics ==
=== Parkour ===
Men

Athlete	Event	Qualification		Final	
Athlete	Event	Result	Rank	Result	Rank
Sida Fu	Men's freestyle	12.6	7 Q	17.4	5

Women

Athlete	Event	Qualification		Final	
Athlete	Event	Result	Rank	Result	Rank
Chunsong Shang	Women's freestyle	24.1	1 Q	24.7	1st place, gold medalist(s)

== Inline hockey ==
Summary

Team	Event	Group stage				Semifinal	Final / BM	
Team	Event	Opposition Score	Opposition Score	Opposition Score	Rank	Opposition Score	Opposition Score	Rank
China men	Men's tournament	United States; L 20–1	Namibia; L 3–5	Chinese Taipei; L 4–1	4	Italy; L 7–1	Argentina; L 4–5	8

== Korfball ==
Indoor

China qualified as hosts.

Athlete	Event	Group stage				Semi-final	Final / BM	
Athlete	Event	Opposition Score	Opposition Score	Opposition Score	Rank	Opposition Score	Opposition Score	Rank
Team China	Korfball	Chinese Taipei; L 14-28	Portugal; L 9-21	Netherlands; L 9-35	4	Suriname; L 12-19	Portugal; L 16-18	8

Beach

China qualified as hosts.

Athlete	Event	Group stage				Quarterfinal	Semi-final	Final / BM	
Athlete	Event	Opposition Score	Opposition Score	Opposition Score	Rank	Opposition Score	Opposition Score	Opposition Score	Rank
Team China	Beach Korfball	Hungary; L 5-9	Chinese Taipei; L 3-14	United States; W 18-6	3	Belgium; L 2–13	Australia; W 13-6	Poland; L 6-10	6

== Softball ==
Women

Team	Event	Group play				Semifinal	Final / BM	
Team	Event	Opposition Result	Opposition Result	Opposition Result	Rank	Opposition Result	Opposition Result	Rank
China women	Women's tournament	Netherlands; L 1–3	Chinese Taipei; L 8–1	United States; L 1–8	4	5th–8th Classification; Australia; L 3–4	Seventh place play-off Netherlands; Cancelled	=5

== Squash ==
Athlete	Event	Round of 32	Round of 16 / CR	Quarterfinals / CQ	Semi-finals / CS	Final / BM / CF	
Athlete	Event	Opposition Score	Opposition Score	Opposition Score	Opposition Score	Opposition Score	Rank
Penglin Zhou	Men's singles	Nasser (EGY); L 0–3	Classification round Adegoke (NGR); L 3–0	Consolation round Chen (CHN); W 3–0	Consolation round Krysiak (POL); L 3–0	Did not advance	=27
Haisong Chen	Men's singles	Zaman (PAK); L 3–0	Classification round Zhang (CHN); L 0–3	Consolation round Zhou (CHN); L 3–0	Did not advance		=29
Guanyu Zhang	Men's singles	Rodriguez (COL); L 0–3	Classification round Chen (CHN); W 0–3	Classification round Adegoke (NGR); L 3–0	Did not advance		=21
Haizhen Li	Men's singles	Farkas (HUN); L 0–3	Classification round Palomino (COL); L 3–0	Consolation round Shcherbakov (UKR); L 3–0	Did not advance		=29
Xuanyi Zhu	Men's singles	Leung (HKG); L 3–0	Classification round Pena (ROU); L 0–3	Consolation round Lutz (AUT); L 3–0	Did not advance		=29
Ziyuan Yin	Women's singles	Watanabe (JPN); L 3–0	Classification round Peychar (AUT); L 0–3	Consolation round Xu (CHN); W 3–1	Consolation round Ghiorshisor (ROU); W 3–0	Consolation final Sugimoto (JPN); L 0–3	26
Yunxin Xu	Women's singles	Hani (EGY); L 0–3	Classification round Sramkova (CZE); L 3–0	Consolation round Yin (CHN); L 3–1	Did not advance		=29
Linglu Cheng	Women's singles	Dominguez (ESP); L 3–0	Classification round Otrzasek (POL); L 0–3	Consolation round Ghiorshisor (ROU); L 1–3	Did not advance		=29
Yuning Zhang	Women's singles	Stephan (FRA); L 3–0	Classification round Cepova (CZE); L 0–3	Consolation round Zhang (CHN); W 3–0	Consolation round Sugimoto (JPN); L 1–3	Did not advance	=27
Yaqi Zhang	Women's singles	Beinhard (GER); L 3–0	Classification round Bushma (UKR); L 0–3	Consolation round Zhang (CHN); L 3–0	Did not advance		=29
Ziyi Liu	Women's singles	Ho (HKG); L 0–3	Classification round Lamb (AUS); W 2–3	Classification round Barbeau (FRA); L 3–0	Did not advance		=21
