= Sport climbing at the 2025 World Games – Women's Speed Single =

Women's speed single sport climbing at the 2025 World Games

Sport climbing – Women's Speed Single at the 2025 World Games
- Venue: Tianfu Park, Chengdu, China
- Dates: 14 August
- Competitors: 36 from 10 nations

Medalists
gold medal	Deng Lijuan	China
silver medal	Qin Yumei	China
bronze medal	Zhou Yafei	China

The women's speed single competition in sport climbing at the 2025 World Games took place on 14 August 2025 at Tianfu Park in Chengdu, China.

== Competition format ==
A total of 36 athletes entered the competition. In qualification every athlete has 2 runs, best time counts. Top 16 climbers qualify for the main competition.

== Results ==
=== Qualification ===
Rank	Athlete	Nation	Lane A	Lane B	Best	Note
1	Zhou Yafei	China	6.59	6.34	6.34	Q
2	Desak Made Rita Kusuma Dewi	Indonesia	6.71	6.50	6.50	Q
3	Qin Yumei	China	7.74	6.605	6.605	Q
4	Deng Lijuan	China	6.608	6.69	6.608	Q
5	Emma Hunt	United States	6.65	6.80	6.65	Q
6	Jeong Ji-min	South Korea	6.74	6.80	6.74	Q
7	Natalia Kałucka	Poland	6.87	7.17	6.87	Q
8	Zhang Shaoqin	China	Fall	7.01	7.01	Q
9	Puja Lestari	Indonesia	7.19	7.04	7.04	Q
10	Beatrice Colli	Italy	7.08	7.39	7.08	Q
11	Piper Kelly	United States	7.330	7.69	7.330	Q
12	Isis Rothfork	United States	10.58	7.330	7.330	Q
13	Guilia Randi	Italy	7.35	7.39	7.35	Q
14	Sung Han-areum	South Korea	7.42	7.39	7.39	Q
15	Agnese Fiorio	Italy	7.43	Fall	7.43	Q
16	Amanda Narda Mutia	Indonesia	Fall	7.45	7.45	Q
17	Rajiah Sallsabillah	Indonesia	7.56	9.31	7.56	
18	Sophia Curcio	United States	7.75	7.69	7.69	
19	Julia Koch	Germany	7.89	7.73	7.73	
20	Fumika Kawakami	Japan	8.03	9.95	8.03	
21	Sara Strocchi	Italy	8.26	8.04	8.04	
22	Ren Koyamatsu	Japan	8.09	9.21	8.09	
23	Hwang Ji-min	South Korea	8.22	8.23	8.22	
24	Nele Thomas	Germany	8.250	8.27	8.250	
25	Anna Brożek	Poland	11.98	8.257	8.257	
26	Martyna Stokowiec	Poland	10.78	8.55	8.55	
27	Ai Takeuchi	Japan	8.85	9.17	8.85	
28	Helen Lee	New Zealand	8.97	10.53	8.97	
29	Jorja Rangi	New Zealand	8.98	9.10	8.98	
30	Abby Gebert	New Zealand	8.99	11.65	8.99	
31	Sarah Tetzlaff	New Zealand	Fall	9.68	9.68	
32	Mina Schultz	Germany	Fall	9.68	9.68	
33	Yun Da-som	South Korea	10.70	Fall	10.70	
34	Tegwen Oates	South Africa	10.88	11.41	10.88	
35	Maria Szwed	Poland	Fall	12.52	12.52	
36	Aniya Holder	South Africa	FS	10.18	FS	

=== Competition bracket ===
Round of 16
1 (China) Zhou Yafei	6.59
16 (Indonesia) Amanda Narda Mutia	7.72
8 (China) Zhang Shaoqin	6.92
9 (Indonesia) Puja Lestari	6.97
4 (China) Deng Lijuan	6.79
13 (Italy) Giulia Randi	10.29
5 (United States) Emma Hunt	6.72
12 (United States) Isis Rothfork	7.31
2 (Indonesia) Desak Made Rita Kusuma Dewi	6.82
15 (Italy) Agnese Fiorio	8.30
7 (Poland) Natalia Kałucka	6.88
10 (Italy) Beatrice Colli	7.07
3 (China) Qin Yumei	6.59
14 (South Korea) Sung Hanareum	7.22
6 (South Korea) Jeong Ji-min	6.74
11 (United States) Piper Kelly	11.51

Quarterfinals
(China) Zhou Yafei	6.42
(China) Zhang Shaoqin	6.98
(China) Deng Lijuan	6.36
(United States) Emma Hunt	6.54
(Indonesia) Desak Made Rita Kusuma Dewi	6.50
(Poland) Natalia Kałucka	6.74
(China) Qin Yumei	6.48
(South Korea) Jeong Ji-min	7.81

Semifinals
(China) Zhou Yafei	6.61
(China) Deng Lijuan	6.36
(Indonesia) Desak Made Rita Kusuma Dewi	8.34
(China) Qin Yumei	6.63

Final
(China) Deng Lijuan	6.40
(China) Qin Yumei	6.41
Third place
(China) Zhou Yafei	6.31
(Indonesia) Desak Made Rita Kusuma Dewi	6.34
