= Sport climbing at the 2025 World Games – Women's Speed Single 4 =

Women's speed single 4 sport climbing at the 2025 World Games

Sport climbing – Women's Speed Single 4 at the 2025 World Games
- Venue: Tianfu Park, Chengdu, China
- Dates: 15 August
- Competitors: 35 from 11 nations

Medalists
gold medal	Desak Made Rita Kusuma Dewi	Indonesia
silver medal	Qin Yu Mei	China
bronze medal	Rajiah Sallsabillah	Indonesia

The women's speed single 4 competition in sport climbing at the 2025 World Games took place on 15 August 2025 at Tianfu Park in Chengdu, China.

== Competition format ==
A total of 35 athletes entered the competition. In qualification, every athlete has 4 runs, best time counts. The top 16 climbers qualify for the main competition.

== Results ==
=== Final ===
Rank	Athlete	Nation	Result
1	Desak Made Rita Kusuma Dewi	Indonesia	6.35
2	Qin Yu Mei	China	6.42
3	Rajiah Sallsabillah	Indonesia	6.951
4	Natalia Kałucka	Poland	6.956

=== Semifinals ===
==== Heat 1 ====
Rank	Athlete	Nation	Result	Note
1	Qin Yu Mei	China	6.58	W
2	Rajiah Sallsabillah	Indonesia	7.14	W
3	Emma Hunt	United States	7.55	
4	Zhou Yafei	China	Fall	

==== Heat 2 ====
Rank	Athlete	Nation	Result	Note
1	Desak Made Rita Kusuma Dewi	Indonesia	6.35	W
2	Natalia Kałucka	Poland	6.90	W
3	Sung Hanareum	South Korea	7.13	
4	Fumika Kawakami	Japan	7.64	

=== Quarterfinals ===
==== Heat 1 ====
Rank	Athlete	Nation	Result	Note
1	Zhou Yafei	China	7.08	W
2	Rajiah Sallsabillah	Indonesia	7.12	W
3	Agnese Fioro	Italy	7.48	
4	Ai Takeuchi	Japan	7.97	

==== Heat 2 ====
Rank	Athlete	Nation	Result	Note
1	Qin Yu Mei	China	6.71	W
2	Emma Hunt	United States	6.81	W
3	Ren Koyamatsu	Japan	7.40	
4	Sophia Curcio	United States	8.51	

==== Heat 3 ====
Rank	Athlete	Nation	Result	Note
1	Sung Hanareum	South Korea	7.39	W
2	Fumika Kawakami	Japan	7.73	W
3	Beatrice Colli	Italy	8.39	
4	Jeong Jimin	South Korea	9.53	

==== Heat 4 ====
Rank	Athlete	Nation	Result	Note
1	Desak Made Rita Kusuma Dewi	Indonesia	6.42	W
2	Natalia Kałucka	Poland	6.95	W
3	Giulia Randi	Italy	7.24	
4	Sara Strocchi	Italy	8.73	

=== Qualification - Elimination Heats ===
==== Heat 1 ====
Rank	Athlete	Nation	Result	Note
1	Ren Koyamatsu	Japan	7.40	W
2	Sophia Curcio	United States	7.84	W
3	Anna Brozek	Poland	9.55	
4	Isis Rothfork	United States	Fall	

==== Heat 2 ====
Rank	Athlete	Nation	Result	Note
1	Agnese Fiorio	Italy	7.37	W
2	Ai Takeuchi	Japan	8.82	W
3	Julia Koch	Germany	9.37	
4	Amanda Narda Mutia	Indonesia	9.44	

==== Heat 3 ====
Rank	Athlete	Nation	Result	Note
1	Sung Hanareum	South Korea	7.29	W
2	Sara Strocchi	Italy	7.63	W
3	Nele Thomas	Germany	7.88	
4	Zhang Shao Qin	China	DNS	

==== Heat 4 ====
Rank	Athlete	Nation	Result	Note
1	Giulia Randi	Italy	7.35	W
2	Fumika Kawakami	Japan	7.72	W
3	Puja Lestari	Indonesia	10.13	
4	Kelly Piper	United States	Fall	

=== Qualification - Seeding Heats ===
Rank	Athlete	Nation	Lane A	Lane B	Lane C	Lane D	Best	Note
1	Zhou Yafei	China	6.49	6.45	6.32	6.56	6.32	Q
2	Jeong Jimin	South Korea	9.46	6.82	6.57	6.51	6.51	Q
3	Desak Made Rita Kusuma Dewi	Indonesia	6.63	6.60	6.70	7.92	6.60	Q
4	Emma Hunt	United States	10.08	6.99	6.72	8.25	6.72	Q
5	Qin Yu Mei	China	6.79	Fall	6.89	7.77	6.79	Q
6	Natalia Kałucka	Poland	9.24	7.14	7.02	6.87	6.87	Q
7	Beatrice Colli	Italy	7.09	7.41	Fall	7.32	7.09	Q
8	Rajiah Sallsabillah	Indonesia	8.59	7.23	7.37	7.28	7.23	EH
9	Isis Rothfork	United States	7.32	10.45	7.25	8.53	7.25	EH
10	Zhang Shao Qin	United States	7.47	7.37	7.27	14.34	7.27	EH
11	Puja Lestari	Indonesia	7.61	7.285	7.44	7.44	7.285	EH
12	Agnese Fiorio	Italy	8.24	8.74	7.52	7.288	7.288	EH
13	Amanda Narda Mutia	Indonesia	Fall	10.81	7.31	7.34	7.31	EH
14	Giulia Randi	Italy	7.92	7.46	7.49	Fall	7.46	EH
15	Sung Hanareum	South Korea	Fall	7.49	7.47	7.61	7.47	EH
16	Ren Koyamatsu	Japan	7.65	7.49	7.87	7.59	7.49	EH
17	Sophia Curcio	United States	Fall	7.90	7.57	7.74	7.57	EH
18	Sara Strocchi	Italy	7.67	14.95	7.91	9.47	7.67	EH
19	Kelly Piper	United States	7.68	8.58	9.33	7.69	7.68	EH
20	Julia Koch	Germany	7.85	8.60	7.83	7.82	7.82	EH
21	Ai Takeuchi	Japan	7.83	8.11	7.88	8.77	7.83	EH
22	Fumika Kawakami	Japan	11.10	12.21	8.02	7.92	7.92	EH
23	Nele Thomas	Germany	9.15	8.38	8.22	8.19	8.19	EH
24	Anna Brozek	Poland	9.07	Fall	8.23	8.79	8.23	EH
25	Helen Lee	New Zealand	8.57	8.29	8.42	8.89	8.29	
26	Hwang Jimin	South Korea	9.18	8.36	9.73	8.35	8.35	
27	Martyna Stokowiec	Poland	12.08	Fall	8.39	Fall	8.39	
28	Abby Gebert	New Zealand	8.76	8.63	8.61	9.30	8.61	
29	Yun Dasom	South Korea	8.62	12.96	8.98	9.56	8.62	
30	Mina Schultz	Germany	Fall	13.09	9.09	8.81	8.81	
31	Jorga Rangi	New Zealand	9.10	9.10	9.46	9.12	9.10	
32	Maria Szwed	Poland	Fall	Fall	11.58	9.11	9.11	
33	Aniya Holder	South Africa	9.82	Fall	9.40	10.31	9.40	
34	Sarah Tetzlaff	New Zealand	12.13	12.84	9.54	16.03	9.54	
35	Tegwen Oates	South Africa	11.08	14.35	11.12	10.86	10.86	
