= Sport climbing at the 2025 World Games – Men's Speed Single =

Men's speed single sport climbing at the 2025 World Games

Sport climbing – Men's Speed Single at the 2025 World Games
- Venue: Tianfu Park, Chengdu, China
- Dates: 14 August
- Competitors: 33 from 10 nations

Medalists
gold medal	Chu Shouhong	China
silver medal	Samuel Watson	United States
bronze medal	Long Jianguo	China

The men's speed single competition in sport climbing at the 2025 World Games took place on 14 August 2025 at Tianfu Park in Chengdu, China.

== Competition format ==
A total of 33 athletes entered the competition. In qualification every athlete has 2 runs, best time counts. Top 16 climbers qualify for the main competition

== Results ==
=== Qualification ===
Rank	Athlete	Nation	Lane A	Lane B	Best	Note
1	Raharjati Nursamsa	Indonesia	4.93	Fall	4.93	Q
2	Long Jianguo	China	5.20	4.98	4.98	Q
3	Yaroslav Tkach	Ukraine	7.86	5.02	5.02	Q
4	Rishat Khaibullin	Kazakhstan	5.10	5.04	5.04	Q
5	Amir Maimuratov	Kazakhstan	5.82	5.05	5.05	Q
6	Veddriq Leonardo	Indonesia	5.13	5.074	5.074	Q
7	Li Xu	China	5.27	5.075	5.075	Q
8	Kiromal Katibin	Indonesia	5.14	5.31	5.14	Q
9	Chu Shouhong	China	5.47	5.158	5.158	Q
10	Ryo Omasa	Japan	5.159	5.16	5.159	Q
11	Samuel Watson	United States	5.16	5.36	5.16	Q
12	Shuto Fujino	Japan	5.23	5.70	5.23	Q
13	Ludovico Fossali	Italy	5.26	5.45	5.26	Q
14	Matteo Zurloni	Italy	5.63	5.27	5.27	Q
15	Julian David	New Zealand	5.33	6.25	5.33	Q
16	Beknur Altynbekov	Kazakhstan	6.56	5.35	5.35	Q
17	Hryhorii Ilchyshyn	Ukraine	5.36	5.97	5.36	
18	Alfian Muhammad Fajri	Indonesia	5.38	6.75	5.38	
19	Damir Toktarov	Kazakhstan	8.53	5.43	5.43	
20	Sebastian Lucke	Germany	5.48	5.44	5.44	
21	Gian Luca Zodda	Italy	Fall	5.45	5.45	
22	Luca Robbiati	Italy	5.52	Fall	5.52	
23	Motonori Tabuchi	Japan	6.87	5.55	5.55	
24	Josh Bruyns	South Africa	Fall	5.63	5.63	
25	Kostiantyn Pavlenko	Ukraine	5.73	5.72	5.72	
26	Denys Mozolevych	Ukraine	Fall	6.03	6.03	
27	Yang Jie	China	6.13	7.42	6.13	
28	Ned Johnston	New Zealand	6.68	7.63	6.68	
29	Leander Carmanns	Germany	7.14	Fall	7.14	
30	John-David Muller	South Africa	7.89	7.83	7.83	
31	Flynn Chisholm	New Zealand	8.38	7.88	7.88	
32	Jun Yasukawa	Japan	9.17	Fall	9.17	
33	Kaz Adams	New Zealand	Fall	Fall	Fall	

=== Competition bracket ===
Round of 16
1 (Indonesia) Raharjati Nursamsa	5.98
16 (Kazakhstan) Beknur Altynbekov	8.58
8 (Indonesia) Kiromal Katibin	5.28
9 (China) Chu Shouhong	4.94
4 (Kazakhstan) Rishat Khaibullin	5.17
13 (Italy) Ludovico Fossali	5.15
5 (Kazakhstan) Amir Maimuratov	5.04
12 (Japan) Shuto Fujino	5.18
2 (China) Long Jianguo	5.05
15 (New Zealand) Julian David	5.46
7 (China) Li Xu	5.04
10 (Japan) Ryo Omasa	5.05
3 (Ukraine) Yaroslav Tkach	5.07
14 (Italy) Matteo Zurloni	5.20
6 (Indonesia) Veddriq Leonardo	5.05
11 (United States) Samuel Watson	4.90

Quarterfinals
(Indonesia) Raharjati Nursamsa	5.11
(China) Chu Shouhong	4.83
(Italy) Ludovico Fossali	5.27
(Kazakhstan) Amir Maimuratov	Fall
(China) Long Jianguo	4.97
(China) Li Xu	Fall
(Ukraine) Yaroslav Tkach	5.78
(United States) Samuel Watson	4.87

Semifinals
(China) Chu Shouhong	4.93
(Italy) Ludovico Fossali	5.03
(China) Long Jianguo	4.97
(United States) Samuel Watson	4.90

Final
(China) Chu Shouhong	4.80
(United States) Samuel Watson	4.96
Third place
(Italy) Ludovico Fossali	6.33
(China) Long Jianguo	4.83
