= 2026 World Climbing Asia Championship =

Biennial competition climbing event

- Venue: Meishan International Climbing Center
- Location: Meishan, China
- Date: 8 – 12 April 2026
- Website: https://www.worldclimbing.com/events/world-climbing-asia-championship-meishan-2026/results/

The 2026 World Climbing Asia Championship, the 30th edition, was held in Meishan, China from 8 to 12 April 2026. The Asian competition climbing continental championships consists of lead, speed, bouldering.

The Asian continental champions earn qualification slots for the 2027 World Climbing Championships in their respective disciplines. Additionally, athletes who finish within the top six in each gender for Boulder and Lead, and the top eight for Speed, qualify for the 2026 Asian Games, subject to the maximum quota per gender per nation.

== Competition highlights ==
Ai Mori flashed all boulders in the final, earning a perfect score of 100 points. Mori's win also marked her first international victory in the bouldering discipline. In the women's speed discipline, Desak Made Rita Kusuma Dewi set a new Asian Record (AsR) of 6.07 seconds to win gold. She broke her own record twice on the same day, having previously recorded 6.15 seconds in the semifinals.

== Medalists ==
Event	Gold	Silver	Bronze
Men's Lead	Neo Suzuki (JPN)	Sorato Anraku (JPN)	Shion Omata (JPN)
Men's Bouldering	Lee Dohyun (KOR)	Tomoa Narasaki (JPN)	Keita Dohi (JPN)
Men's Speed	Chu Shouhong (CHN)	Zhou Ziyu (CHN)	Veddriq Leonardo (INA)
Women's Lead	Ai Mori (JPN)	Seo Chae-hyun (KOR)	Natsumi Oda (JPN)
Women's Bouldering	Ai Mori (JPN)	Melody Sekikawa (JPN)	Futaba Ito (JPN)
Women's Speed	Desak Made Rita Kusuma Dewi (INA)	Zhou Yafei (CHN)	Qin Yumei (CHN)

== Medal table ==
* Host nation (China)

Rank	Nation	Gold	Silver	Bronze	Total
1	Japan	3	3	4	10
2	China*	1	2	1	4
3	South Korea	1	1	0	2
4	Indonesia	1	0	1	2
Totals (4 entries)		6	6	6	18

== Lead ==
=== Men ===
Rank	Name	Qualification					Semi-Final	Final
Rank	Name	Route 1		Route 2		Points	Semi-Final	Final
Rank	Name	Score	Rank	Score	Rank	Points	Semi-Final	Final
1	(Japan) Neo Suzuki	TOP	1	TOP	1	2.74	TOP	41+
2	(Japan) Sorato Anraku	TOP	1	TOP	1	2.74	42+	40+
3	(Japan) Shion Omata	49	5	50+	10	7.25	49	39
4	(South Korea) Lee Dohyun	48	8	52	8	8.25	44+	39
5	(Japan) Satone Yoshida	TOP	1	TOP	1	2.74	50+	38+
6	(China) Pan Yufei	48+	6	TOP	1	4.42	46+	37+
7	(South Korea) Hyunseung Noh	48+	6	55+	6	6.24	46	36+
8	(Japan) Ao Yurikusa	TOP	1	53+	7	4.18	37+	36+

=== Women ===
Rank	Name	Qualification					Semi-Final	Final
Rank	Name	Route 1		Route 2		Points	Semi-Final	Final
Rank	Name	Score	Rank	Score	Rank	Points	Semi-Final	Final
1	(Japan) Ai Mori	TOP	1	TOP	1	1.73	TOP	TOP
2	(South Korea) Seo Chae-hyun	TOP	1	52+	2	2.45	TOP	41+
3	(Japan) Natsumi Oda	44+	8	49+	9	10.0	44+	34+
4	(South Korea) Chaeyeong Kim	TOP	1	51+	3	3.87	43+	34+
5	(South Korea) Jain Kim	44+	8	51+	3	7.07	44+	31+
6	(Japan) Ryu Nakagawa	44+	8	51+	3	7.07	44+	31+
7	(Japan) Natsuki Tanii	TOP	1	50	8	4.9	46+	21+
8	(Japan) Hana Koike	TOP	1	51+	3	3.87	44+	21+

== Bouldering ==
=== Men ===
Rank	Name	Qualification	Semi-Final	Final
1	(South Korea) Lee Dohyun	94.6	84.4	99.9
2	(Japan) Tomoa Narasaki	108.6	59.7	84.7
3	(Japan) Keita Dohi	99.3	60	74.8
4	(China) Pan Yufei	100	75	59.6
5	(Japan) Sohta Amagasa	85	69.5	54
6	(China) Hu Junzhe	99.6	84.1	49.4
7	(South Korea) Jongwon Chon	70	74.9	44.6
8	(Japan) Rei Kawamata	84.7	60	44

=== Women ===
Rank	Name	Qualification	Semi-Final	Final
1	(Japan) Ai Mori	124.9	69	100
2	(Japan) Melody Sekikawa	125	69.8	85
3	(Japan) Futaba Ito	125	84.7	69.4
4	(China) Luo Zhilu	68.8	68.8	55
5	(Japan) Anon Matsufuji	125	69.6	54.8
6	(Japan) Mao Nakamura	125	69.5	54.2
7	(China) Zhang Yuetong	124.8	69.4	40
8	(Japan) Miho Nonaka	109.7	69.6	39.2

== Speed ==
=== Men ===
Final bracket

Round of 16
1 (Japan) R Omasa	5.00
16 (China) P Wu	5.22
8 (China) Z Zhou	5.10
9 (South Korea) J Jo	5.19
4 (China) Y Ling	5.05
13 (Kazakhstan) R Khaibullin	5.16
5 (Indonesia) A Robby Al Hilmi	5.17
12 (Indonesia) K Katibin	5.38
2 (Indonesia) R Nursamsa	7.51
15 (South Korea) D Kim	6.73
7 (Kazakhstan) D Toktarov	Fall
10 (China) S Chu	5.14
3 (Indonesia) A Tri Syahria	5.00
14 (China) X Wang	5.02
6 (Indonesia) V Leonardo	5.02
11 (Kazakhstan) A Maimuratov	5.07

Quarterfinals
(Japan) R Omasa	5.61
(China) Z Zhou	5.51
(China) Y Ling	Wildcard
(Indonesia) A Robby Al Hilmi	False start
(South Korea) D Kim	5.22
(China) S Chu	5.09
(Indonesia) A Tri Syahria	5.37
(Indonesia) V Leonardo	5.01

Semifinals
(China) Z Zhou	4.90
(China) Y Ling	Fall
(China) S Chu	4.91
(Indonesia) V Leonardo	6.12

Final
(China) Z Zhou	5.04
(China) S Chu	4.90
Third place
(China) Y Ling	Fall
(Indonesia) V Leonardo	5.15

=== Women ===
Final bracket

Round of 16
1 (Indonesia) D Made Rita Kusuma Dewi	6.76
16 (South Korea) H Yang	11.01
8 (South Korea) H Sung	10.19
9 (Indonesia) B Kusuma	7.03
4 (China) Y Qin	6.99
13 (Indonesia) A Kadek	7.15
5 (China) L Deng	6.98
12 (Japan) K Hayashi	Fall
2 (China) Y Zhou	6.91
15 (Singapore) E Tan	8.87
7 (South Korea) J Jeong	6.80
10 (South Korea) J Hwang	8.28
3 (Indonesia) R Sallsabillah	6.74
14 (India) J Purty	7.37
6 (China) M Zhang	7.41
11 (China) S Meng	7.19

Quarterfinals
(Indonesia) D Made Rita Kusuma Dewi	6.48
(Indonesia) B Kusuma	6.73
(China) Y Qin	6.64
(China) L Deng	10.07
(China) Y Zhou	6.72
(South Korea) J Jeong	8.85
(Indonesia) R Sallsabillah	7.83
(China) S Meng	6.98

Semifinals
(Indonesia) D Made Rita Kusuma Dewi	6.15
(China) Y Qin	Fall
(China) Y Zhou	6.62
(China) S Meng	6.85

Final
(Indonesia) D Made Rita Kusuma Dewi	6.07 (AsR)
(China) Y Zhou	6.47
Third place
(China) Y Qin	6.77
(China) S Meng	Fall
