= Sport climbing at the 2025 World Games – Men's Speed Single 4 =

Men's speed single 4 sport climbing at the 2025 World Games

Sport climbing – Men's Speed Single 4 at the 2025 World Games
- Venue: Tianfu Park, Chengdu, China
- Dates: 15 August
- Competitors: 35 from 10 nations

Medalists
gold medal	Long Jianguo	China
silver medal	Kiromal Katibin	Indonesia
bronze medal	Rishat Khaibullin	Kazakhstan

The men's speed single 4 competition in sport climbing at the 2025 World Games took place on 15 August 2025 at Tianfu Park in Chengdu, China.

== Competition format ==
A total of 35 athletes entered the competition. In qualification, every athlete has 4 runs, best time counts. The top 16 climbers qualify for the main competition.

== Results ==
=== Final ===
Rank	Athlete	Nation	Result
1	Long Jian Guo	China	4.74
2	Kiromal Katibin	Indonesia	4.81
3	Rishat Khaibullin	Kazakhstan	4.83
4	Raharjati Nursamsa	Indonesia	5.14

=== Semifinals ===
==== Heat 1 ====
Rank	Athlete	Nation	Result	Note
1	Long Jian Guo	China	4.86	W
2	Raharjati Nursamsa	Indonesia	4.98	W
3	Ryo Omasa	Japan	5.01	
4	Logan Schlecht	United States	5.21	

==== Heat 2 ====
Rank	Athlete	Nation	Result	Note
1	Kiromal Katibin	Indonesia	4.83	W
2	Rishat Khaibullin	Kazakhstan	4.90	W
3	Chu Shou Hong	China	4.91	
4	Michael Hom	United States	5.66	

=== Quarterfinals ===
==== Heat 1 ====
Rank	Athlete	Nation	Result	Note
1	Logan Schlecht	United States	5.41	W
2	Long Jian Guo	China	6.95	W
3	Yang Jie	China	7.44	
4	Veddriq Leonardo	Indonesia	FS	

==== Heat 2 ====
Rank	Athlete	Nation	Result	Note
1	Raharjati Nursamsa	Indonesia	4.98	W
2	Ryo Omasa	Japan	5.05	W
3	Leander Carmanns	Germany	5.10	
4	Amir Maimuratov	Kazakhstan	5.28	

==== Heat 3 ====
Rank	Athlete	Nation	Result	Note
1	Kiromal Katibin	Indonesia	4.90	W
2	Rishat Khaibullin	Kazakhstan	5.05	W
3	Shuto Fujino	Japan	5.15	
4	Luca Robbiati	Italy	5.52	

==== Heat 4 ====
Rank	Athlete	Nation	Result	Note
1	Chu Shou Hong	China	5.11	W
2	Michael Hom	United States	5.14	W
3	Li Xu	China	5.24	
4	Ludovico Fossali	Italy	Fall	

=== Qualification - Elimination Heats ===
==== Heat 1 ====
Rank	Athlete	Nation	Result	Note
1	Michael Hom	United States	5.14	W
2	Shuto Fujino	Japan	7.24	W
3	Matteo Zurloni	Italy	5.57	
4	Yaroslav Tkach	Ukraine	Fall	

==== Heat 2 ====
Rank	Athlete	Nation	Result	Note
1	Ryo Omasa	Japan	5.23	W
2	Logan Schlecht	United States	5.45	W
3	Jun Yasukawa	Japan	5.46	
4	Motonori Tabuchi	Japan	Fall	

==== Heat 3 ====
Rank	Athlete	Nation	Result	Note
1	Veddriq Leonardo	Indonesia	5.09	W
2	Luca Robbiati	Italy	5.11	W
3	Alfian Muhammad Fajri	Indonesia	5.38	
4	Hryhorii Ilchyshyn	Ukraine	5.64	

==== Heat 4 ====
Rank	Athlete	Nation	Result	Note
1	Amir Maimuratov	Kazakhstan	5.21	W
2	Ludovico Fossali	Italy	5.23	W
3	Sebastian Lucke	Germany	5.27	
4	Beknur Altynbekov	Kazakhstan	5.57	

=== Qualification - Seeding Heats ===
Rank	Athlete	Nation	Lane A	Lane B	Lane C	Lane D	Best	Note
1	Long Jian Guo	China	5.01	DNS	4.93	Fall	4.93	Q
2	Kiromal Katibin	Indonesia	5.26	4.96	DNS	4.96	4.96	Q
3	Chu Shou Hong	China	4.974	7.22	DNS	4.96	4.974	Q
4	Raharjati Nursamsa	Indonesia	4.976	5.17	5.03	5.31	4.976	Q
5	Leander Carmanns	Germany	Fall	5.20	5.03	5.31	5.03	Q
6	Li Xu	China	8.11	5.09	5.05	5.31	5.05	Q
7	Rishat Khaibullin	Kazakhstan	5.06	5.19	5.21	Fall	5.06	Q
8	Yang Jie	China	5.14	5.32	7.17	5.07	5.07	EH
9	Yaroslav Tkach	Ukraine	5.29	5.36	5.09	13.02	5.09	EH
10	Hryhorii Ilchyshyn	Ukraine	6.82	5.34	5.18	7.01	5.18	EH
11	Amir Maimuratov	Kazakhstan	Fall	5.41	5.19	6.28	5.19	EH
12	Motonori Tabuchi	Japan	5.22	Fall	5.37	Fall	5.22	EH
13	Ryo Omasa	Japan	5.230	7.51	5.35	Fall	5.230	EH
14	Sebastian Lucke	Germany	5.28	5.235	5.43	5.27	5.235	EH
15	Luca Robbiati	Italy	8.86	5.251	5.51	5.43	5.251	EH
16	Michael Hom	United States	5.60	6.95	5.30	5.256	5.256	EH
17	Matteo Zurloni	Italy	5.69	5.54	5.27	7.99	5.27	EH
18	Veddriq Leonardo	Indonesia	5.28	6.01	DNS	5.36	5.28	EH
19	Ludovico Fossali	Italy	5.47	5.41	DNS	5.29	5.29	EH
20	Jun Yasukawa	Japan	9.00	5.364	6.58	6.21	5.364	EH
21	Logan Schlecht	United States	5.365	5.68	5.42	5.41	5.365	EH
22	Bekner Altynbekov	Kazakhstan	5.37	6.66	5.57	6.50	5.37	EH
23	Alfian Muhammad Fajri	Indonesia	5.44	6.54	5.78	5.414	5.414	EH
24	Shuto Fujino	Japan	Fall	5.414	7.16	6.58	5.414	EH
25	Gian Luca Zodda	Italy	5.455	Fall	5.418	5.52	5.418	
26	Julian David	New Zealand	6.06	5.459	Fall	5.418	5.418	
27	Denys Mozolevych	Ukraine	6.98	10.22	5.58	5.45	5.45	
28	Damir Toktarov	Kazakhstan	7.72	5.55	5.49	8.16	5.49	
29	Kostiantyn Pavlenko	Ukraine	5.71	6.87	5.59	Fall	5.59	
30	Zach Hammer	United States	6.76	5.75	7.06	Fall	5.75	
31	Josh Bruyns	South Africa	6.18	Fall	Fall	Fall	6.18	
32	Ned Johnston	New Zealand	Fall	6.44	Fall	6.51	6.44	
33	John-David Muller	South Africa	9.60	8.60	7.98	7.74	7.74	
34	Flynn Chisholm	New Zealand	Fall	11.76	7.77	7.95	7.77	
35	Kaz Adams	New Zealand	10.19	10.29	14.05	10.88	10.19	
