= Sport climbing at the 2022 Asian Games =

- Venue: Keqiao Yangshan Sport Climbing Centre
- Dates: 3–7 October 2023
- Competitors: 108 from 16 nations

Competition climbing at the 2022 Asian Games was held at Keqiao Yangshan Sport Climbing Centre, Shaoxing, China, from 3 to 7 October 2023.

== Schedule ==
Q	Qualification	S	Semifinal	F	Final

Event↓/Date →	3rd Tue		4th Wed		5th Thu	6th Fri		7th Sat	
Men's speed	Q	F							
Men's speed relay			Q	F					
Men's combined					Q	S	F		
Women's speed	Q	F							
Women's speed relay			Q	F					
Women's combined					Q			S	F

== Medalists ==
=== Men ===
Event	Gold	Silver	Bronze
Speed	Reza Alipour; Iran	Long Jinbao; China	Veddriq Leonardo; Indonesia
Speed relay	China; Long Jinbao; Wang Xinshang; Wu Peng; Zhang Liang	Indonesia; Aspar Jaelolo; Kiromal Katibin; Veddriq Leonardo; Rahmad Adi Mulyono	South Korea; Jung Yong-jun; Lee Seung-beom; Lee Yong-su
Combined	Sorato Anraku; Japan	Lee Do-hyun; South Korea	Pan Yufei; China

=== Women ===
Event	Gold	Silver	Bronze
Speed	Desak Made Rita Kusuma Dewi; Indonesia	Deng Lijuan; China	Rajiah Sallsabillah; Indonesia
Speed relay	China; Deng Lijuan; Niu Di; Wang Shengyan; Zhang Shaoqin	Indonesia; Desak Made Rita Kusuma Dewi; Nurul Iqamah; Alivany Ver Khadijah; Rajiah Sallsabillah	South Korea; Choi Na-woo; Jeong Ji-min; Noh Hee-ju
Combined	Ai Mori; Japan	Seo Chae-hyun; South Korea	Zhang Yuetong; China

== Medal table ==
Rank	Nation	Gold	Silver	Bronze	Total
1	China (CHN)	2	2	2	6
2	Japan (JPN)	2	0	0	2
3	Indonesia (INA)	1	2	2	5
4	Iran (IRI)	1	0	0	1
5	South Korea (KOR)	0	2	2	4
Totals (5 entries)		6	6	6	18

== Participating nations ==
A total of 108 athletes from 16 nations competed in sport climbing at the 2022 Asian Games:

- China (12)
- Chinese Taipei (2)
- Hong Kong (6)
- India (7)
- Indonesia (12)
- Iran (5)
- Japan (6)
- Kazakhstan (12)
- Kuwait (1)
- Mongolia (5)
- Pakistan (5)
- Philippines (4)
- Singapore (5)
- South Korea (10)
- Thailand (12)
- Uzbekistan (4)
