= Sport climbing at the 2024 Summer Olympics – Women's speed =

Women's speed at the Games of the XXXIII Olympiad
- Olympic sport climbing
- Venue: Le Bourget Sport Climbing Venue, Paris
- Dates: 5 August 2024 (qualification); 7 August 2024 (final)
- Competitors: 14 from 9 nations

Medalists
1st place, gold medalist(s)		Aleksandra Mirosław	Poland
2nd place, silver medalist(s)		Deng Lijuan	China
3rd place, bronze medalist(s)		Aleksandra Kałucka	Poland

The women's competition speed climbing event at the 2024 Summer Olympics took place from 5 to 7 August 2024 at Le Bourget Sport Climbing Venue in Paris.

== Records ==
Prior to this competition, the existing world and Olympic records were as follows:

World Best
World record	Aleksandra Mirosław (POL)	6.24	Rome, Italy	15 September 2023
Olympic record	Aleksandra Mirosław (POL)	6.84	Tokyo, Japan	6 August 2021

== Schedule ==
All times are Central European Time (UTC+02:00)

Date	Time	Event
5 August 2024	13:00	Qualification Seeding
5 August 2024	13:35	Qualification Elimination heats
7 August 2024	12:35	Quarterfinals
7 August 2024	12:46	Semifinals
7 August 2024	12:54	Final

== Results ==
=== Qualification Seeding ===
Rank	Athlete	Lane A	Lane B	Best Time	Notes
1	Aleksandra Mirosław (POL)	6.06	6.21	6.06	WR
2	Emma Hunt (USA)	6.79	6.36	6.36	PB
3	Aleksandra Kałucka (POL)	6.47	6.389	6.389	PB
4	Zhou Yafei (CHN)	6.54	6.389	6.389	PB
5	Deng Lijuan (CHN)	6.43	6.40	6.40	PB
6	Desak Made Rita Kusuma Dewi (INA)	6.52	6.45	6.45	
7	Rajiah Sallsabillah (INA)	6.67	6.58	6.58	PB
8	Leslie Romero Pérez (ESP)	6.94	6.89	6.89	
9	Piper Kelly (USA)	7.47	7.39	7.39	
10	Capucine Viglione (FRA)	9.72	7.53	7.53	
11	Beatrice Colli (ITA)	8.18	10.51	8.18	
12	Sarah Tetzlaff (NZL)	8.39	8.64	8.39	PB
13	Manon Lebon (FRA)	9.09	Fall	9.09	
14	Aniya Holder (RSA)	9.61	9.12	9.12	PB

=== Qualification Elimination Heats ===
Heat	Lane	Athlete	Time	Notes
1	A	Aleksandra Mirosław (POL)	6.10	Q
1	B	Aniya Holder (RSA)	9.36	
2	A	Emma Hunt (USA)	6.38	Q
2	B	Manon Lebon (FRA)	7.07	
3	A	Aleksandra Kałucka (POL)	6.65	Q
3	B	Sarah Tetzlaff (NZL)	8.41	
4	A	Zhou Yafei (CHN)	6.55	Q
4	B	Beatrice Colli (ITA)	6.84	PB
5	A	Deng Lijuan (CHN)	6.55	Q
5	B	Capucine Viglione (FRA)	6.86	
6	A	Desak Made Rita Kusuma Dewi (INA)	6.38	Q
6	B	Piper Kelly (USA)	8.43	
7	A	Rajiah Sallsabillah (INA)	Fall	q
7	B	Leslie Romero Pérez (ESP)	7.26	Q

=== Knockout stage ===
Quarterfinals
Aleksandra Mirosław (POL)	6.35
Leslie Romero Pérez (ESP)	7.06
Aleksandra Kałucka (POL)	6.49
Zhou Yafei (CHN)	6.58
Emma Hunt (USA)	7.98
Rajiah Sallsabillah (INA)	6.54 =PB
Desak Made Rita Kusuma Dewi (INA)	6.369 =PB
Deng Lijuan (CHN)	6.363 PB

Semifinals
Aleksandra Mirosław (POL)	6.19
Aleksandra Kałucka (POL)	6.34 PB
Rajiah Sallsabillah (INA)	6.41 PB
Deng Lijuan (CHN)	6.38

Final
Aleksandra Mirosław (POL)	6.10
Deng Lijuan (CHN)	6.18 PB
Bronze medal match
Aleksandra Kałucka (POL)	6.53
Rajiah Sallsabillah (INA)	8.24

== Final standing ==
Rank	Athlete
1st place, gold medalist(s)	Aleksandra Mirosław (POL)
2nd place, silver medalist(s)	Deng Lijuan (CHN)
3rd place, bronze medalist(s)	Aleksandra Kałucka (POL)
4	Rajiah Sallsabillah (INA)
5	Emma Hunt (USA)
6	Desak Made Rita Kusuma Dewi (INA)
7	Zhou Yafei (CHN)
8	Leslie Romero Pérez (ESP)
9	Beatrice Colli (ITA)
10	Capucine Viglione (FRA)
11	Manon Lebon (FRA)
12	Sarah Tetzlaff (NZL)
13	Piper Kelly (USA)
14	Aniya Holder (RSA)

== See also ==
- Sport climbing at the 2024 Summer Olympics – Men's speed
