= Sport climbing at the 2025 World Games =

Competition climbing event

- Venue: Tianfu Park
- Dates: 14–16 August
- No. of events: 6
- Competitors: 72 from 12 nations

Competition climbing at the 2025 World Games took place from 14 to 16 August 2025 at the Tianfu Park in Chengdu, China. The discipline included six events (three for men and three for women). The competition bouldering and competition lead climbing events were dropped while the competition speed climbing events increased to cover the six events.

== Qualification ==
A total of 72 climbers (36 men and 36 women) qualified for each event. The eight top nations at the 2024 IFSC Climbing World Cup qualified a total of four climbers each.

== Participating nations ==
- China (8)
- Germany (5)
- Indonesia (8)
- Italy (8)
- Japan (7)
- Kazakhstan (4)
- New Zealand (8)
- Poland (4)
- South Africa (4)
- South Korea (4)
- Ukraine (4)
- United States (8)

== Medal table ==
* Host nation (China)

Rank	Nation	Gold	Silver	Bronze	Total
1	China*	5	3	2	10
2	Indonesia	1	1	1	3
3	United States	0	2	1	3
4	Kazakhstan	0	0	1	1
4	South Korea	0	0	1	1
Totals (5 entries)		6	6	6	18

== Medalists ==
=== Men ===
Event	Gold	Silver	Bronze
Single	Chu Shouhong; China	Sam Watson; United States	Long Jianguo; China
Single 4	Long Jianguo; China	Kiromal Katibin; Indonesia	Rishat Khaibullin; Kazakhstan
Relay	China; Chu Shouhong; Long Jianguo	United States; Michael Hom; Logan Schlecht	United States; Zachary Hammer; Sam Watson

=== Women ===
Event	Gold	Silver	Bronze
Single	Deng Lijuan; China	Qin Yumei; China	Zhou Yafei; China
Single 4	Desak Made Rita Kusuma Dewi; Indonesia	Qin Yumei; China	Rajiah Sallsabillah; Indonesia
Relay	China; Deng Lijuan; Zhou Yafei	China; Qin Yumei; Zhang Shaoqin	South Korea; Jeong Ji-min; Sung Han-areum
