= Freestyle inline skating at the 2025 World Games =

- Venue: Chengdu Roller Sports Centre
- Dates: 16–17 August 2025
- No. of events: 4
- Competitors: 36 from 8 nations

The freestyle inline skating competition at the 2025 World Games took place from 16 to 17 August 2025, in Chengdu in China, at the Chengdu Roller Sports Centre. The discipline made its debut with four events, as a part of the roller sports.

== Qualification ==
A total of nine skaters qualified for each event. Six spots were given by the 2024 World Skate Games. The remaining two spots are the given to the host nation and a skater from The World Game Series.

== Participating nations ==
- China (8)
- Chinese Taipei (7)
- India (2)
- Iran (4)
- Italy (5)
- Japan (3)
- Spain (4)
- Thailand (3)

== Medal table ==
* Host nation (China)

Rank	Nation	Gold	Silver	Bronze	Total
1	China*	3	3	2	8
2	Chinese Taipei	1	0	0	1
3	Italy	0	1	0	1
4	Iran	0	0	1	1
4	Spain	0	0	1	1
Totals (5 entries)		4	4	4	12

== Medalists ==
=== Men ===
Event	Gold	Silver	Bronze
Slalom classic	Zhang Hao; China	Valerio Degli Agostini; Italy	Wang Yuxuan; China
Speed slalom	Zhang Hao; China	Fu Yu; China	Reza Lesani; Iran

=== Women ===
Event	Gold	Silver	Bronze
Slalom classic	Zhu Siyi; China	Liu Jaxin; China	Laura Oria; Spain
Speed slalom	Liu Chiao-hsi; Chinese Taipei	Zhu Siyi; China	Wen Jingjing; China
