= Muaythai at the 2025 World Games – Women's 48 kg =

World Games muaythai event

Women's 48 kg at the 2025 World Games
- Muaythai pictogram
- Venue: Sichuan Provincial Gymnasium
- Dates: 8–10 August 2025
- Competitors: 8 from 8 nations

Medalists
1st place, gold medalist(s)		Liu Xiaohui	China
2nd place, silver medalist(s)		Kullanat Aonok	Thailand
3rd place, bronze medalist(s)		Oumaima Belouarrat	Morocco

The women's 48 kg muaythai (Note: Muaythai is the official name of Muay Thai, recognized by International World Games Association and International Olympic Committee.) event at the 2025 World Games will be held from 8 to 10 August 2025 at the Sichuan Provincial Gymnasium. 8 Muay Thai practitioners from 8 nations participated in the event.

== Competition schedule ==
All times are in local time (UTC+8), according to the official schedule.

Date	Time	Event
8 August 2025	13:00	Quarterfinals
9 August 2025	18:00	Semifinals
10 August 2025	18:00	Bronze medal match
10 August 2025	19:30	Gold medal match

== Results ==
=== Legend ===
- RET — Won by Retirement
- RSC-H — Won by Referee Stopping Contest - Hard Head Blows
- WO — Won by Walkover

=== Bracket ===
Quarterfinals
Anastasiia Mykhailenko (UKR)	27
Rudzma Abubakar (PHI)	30
Chery Gwa (SGP)	28
Liu Xiaohui (CHN)	29
Oumaima Belouarrat (MAR)	30
Sibel Oruç (TUR)	27
Jovena Peñol (FIN)	28
Kullanat Aonok (THA)	29

Semifinals
Rudzma Abubakar (PHI)	9
Liu Xiaohui (CHN)	10 RSC
Oumaima Belouarrat (MAR)	27
Kullanat Aonok (THA)	30

Gold medal bout
Liu Xiaohui (CHN)	30
Kullanat Aonok (THA)	27
Bronze medal bout
Rudzma Abubakar (PHI)
Oumaima Belouarrat (MAR)	WO
