= Sport climbing at the 2026 Asian Games – Women's speed =

Women's speed at the 2026 Asian Games
- Venue: Portmesse Nagoya Exhibition Hall 1
- Location: Nagoya, Aichi Prefecture, Japan
- Dates: 29 – 30 September 2026
- Competitors: 17 from 10 nations

Medalists
gold medal	Desak Made Rita Kusuma Dewi	Indonesia
silver medal	Deng Lijuan	China
bronze medal	Jeong Ji-min	South Korea

The women's competition speed climbing event at the 2026 Asian Games took place from 29 to 30 September 2026 at Portmesse Nagoya Exhibition Hall 1.

== Schedule ==
The schedule is as follows:

Date	Time	Event
Tuesday, 29 September 2026	13:00	Qualification
Wednesday, 30 September 2026	20:06	Quarter-finals
Wednesday, 30 September 2026	20:19	Semi-finals
Wednesday, 30 September 2026	20:28	Finals

== Records ==
Prior to this competition, the existing World, Asian and Games records were as follows.

Record	Athlete	Time	Location	Date
World Record	Emma Hunt (USA)	5.99	Kraków, Poland	4 July 2026
Asian Record	Desak Made Rita Kusuma Dewi (INA)	6.07	Meishan, China	9 April 2026
Games Record	Desak Made Rita Kusuma Dewi (INA)	6.52	Hangzhou, China	3 October 2023

The following Games records were set during the competition:

Round	Athlete	Time	Date
Qualification	Deng Lijuan (CHN)	6.23	29 September 2026
Final	Desak Made Rita Kusuma Dewi (INA)	6.062	30 September 2026

== Results ==
Below the results of the qualification and elimination rounds:

=== Qualification ===
Rank	Athlete	Lane A	Lane B	Lane C	Lane D	Best
1	Deng Lijuan (CHN)	6.29	6.34	6.23 (GR)	6.37	6.23
2	Jeong Ji-min (KOR)	6.57	6.26	6.25	9.23	6.25
3	Desak Made Rita Kusuma Dewi (INA)	6.29	7.12	FS	6.41	6.29
4	Zhou Yafei (CHN)	6.44	Fall	6.56	Fall	6.44
5	Berthdigna Kusuma (INA)	6.59	6.49	6.58	6.74	6.49
6	Sung Hana-reum (KOR)	FS	6.92	6.89	6.84	6.84
7	Ren Koyamatsu (JPN)	7.67	6.92	6.93	7.01	6.928 TBT 6.93
8	Karin Hayashi (JPN)	6.92	6.95	6.99	7.06	6.928 TBT 6.95
9	Joga Purty (IND)	8.84	7.28	7.30	10.88	7.28
10	Narada Disyabut (THA)	7.43	7.45	7.78	FS	7.43
11	Tamara Ulzhabaeva (KAZ)	12.47	7.60	7.64	7.53	7.53
12	Eilin Tan (SGP)	FS	8.40	7.62	8.42	7.62
13	Adeliya Utesheva (KAZ)	7.89	11.25	7.68	11.84	7.68
14	Jeanette Koh (SGP)	9.10	8.32	8.19	8.15	8.15
15	Napat Disyabut (THA)	8.18	10.44	8.20	11.05	8.18
16	Lam Cho Wing (HKG)	8.46	12.85	11.16	8.73	8.46
17	Jood Farkouh (JOR)	15.58	16.38	16.67	16.43	15.58

=== Quarter-finals ===
Heat 1

Seed	Athlete	Result	Notes
1	Deng Lijuan (CHN)	TBT: 6.522	SF
8	Karin Hayashi (JPN)	TBT: 8.302	SF
9	Joga Purty (IND)	TBT: Fall	E
16	Lam Cho Wing (HKG)	FS	E

Heat 2

Seed	Athlete	Result	Notes
4	Zhou Yafei (CHN)	6.49	SF
5	Berthdigna Kusuma (INA)	6.73	SF
13	Adeliya Utesheva (KAZ)	7.77	E
12	Eilin Tan (SGP)	Fall	E

Heat 3

Seed	Athlete	Result	Notes
2	Jeong Ji-min (KOR)	6.39	SF
7	Ren Koyamatsu (JPN)	7.09	SF
10	Narada Disyabut (THA)	7.46	E
15	Napat Disyabut (THA)	7.95	E

Heat 4

Seed	Athlete	Result	Notes
3	Desak Made Rita Kusuma Dewi (INA)	TBT: 6.399	SF
11	Tamara Ulzhabaeva (KAZ)	TBT: 8.611	SF
14	Jeanette Koh (SGP)	TBT: 8.644	E
6	Sung Hana-reum (KOR)	FS	E

=== Semi-finals ===
Heat 1

Seed	Athlete	Result	Notes
1	Deng Lijuan (CHN)	6.32	F
4	Zhou Yafei (CHN)	6.42	F
5	Berthdigna Kusuma (INA)	6.57	E
8	Karin Hayashi (JPN)	6.99	E

Heat 2

Seed	Athlete	Result	Notes
3	Desak Made Rita Kusuma Dewi (INA)	6.36	F
2	Jeong Ji-min (KOR)	6.38	F
7	Ren Koyamatsu (JPN)	6.81	E
11	Tamara Ulzhabaeva (KAZ)	7.50	E

=== Final ===
Seed	Athlete	Result	Notes
3	Desak Made Rita Kusuma Dewi (INA)	TBT: 6.062 (AR)	1st place, gold medalist(s)
1	Deng Lijuan (CHN)	TBT: 6.064	2nd place, silver medalist(s)
2	Jeong Ji-min (KOR)	TBT: 6.18	3rd place, bronze medalist(s)
4	Zhou Yafei (CHN)	FS	
