= Billiard sports at the 2025 World Games =

Billiard sports at the 2025 World Games may refer to:

- Carom at the 2025 World Games
- Pool at the 2025 World Games
- Snooker at the 2025 World Games
