= Cyprus at the 2025 World Games =

- IOC code: CYP
- NOC: Cyprus Olympic Committee

in Chengdu, China 7 August 2025 – 17 August 2025
- Competitors: 2 (2 men and 0 women) in 2 sports and 2 events
- Medals Ranked 71st: Gold 0 Silver 1 Bronze 0 Total 1

World Games appearances
- 1981; 1985; 1989; 1993; 1997; 2001; 2005; 2009; 2013; 2017; 2022; 2025

Cyprus competed at the 2025 World Games held in Chengdu, China from 7 to 17 August 2025.

Snooker player Michael Georgiou won the first ever World Games medal for the country, which is one silver medal. The country finished in 71st place in the medal table.

== Medalist ==
Medal	Name	Sport	Event	Date
Silver	Michael Georgiou	Billiard sports	Men's snooker	14 August

== Competitors ==
The following is the list of number of competitors in the Games.

Sport	Men	Women	Total
Billards	1	0	1
Powerboating	1	0	1
Total	2	0	2
