= Nurul Iqamah =

Indonesian speed climber

Personal information
- Nationality: Indonesia
- Born: 6 May 1995 (age 31) Bima, West Nusa Tenggara, Indonesia

Sport
- Country: Indonesia
- Sport: Competition climbing
- Event: Speed
Medal record
Women's competition climbing
Representing Indonesia
Asian Games
Silver medal – second place	2022 Hangzhou	Speed relay
Asian Championships
Gold medal – first place	2019 Bogor	Speed
Gold medal – first place	2019 Bogor	Speed relay
Gold medal – first place	2019 Bogor	Combined
Gold medal – first place	2022 Seoul	Speed

Nurul Iqamah (born 6 May 1995) is an Indonesian competition climber specializing in competition speed climbing. In 2019, she won three gold medals at the IFSC Climbing Asian Championships in Bogor, Indonesia. In 2023, she won her first ever medal at the IFSC Climbing World Cup, she won bronze medal in the Chamonix, France.

== Achievements ==
=== Asian Games ===
Women's speed relay

Year	Venue	Partner	Opponent	Time (s)	Result	Ref
2022	Keqiao Yangshan Sport Climbing Centre, Shaoxing, China	(Indonesia) Desak Made Rita Kusuma Dewi (Indonesia) Alivany Ver Khadijah (Indonesia) Rajiah Sallsabillah	(China) Deng Lijuan (China) Niu Di (China) Zhang Shaoqin (China) Wang Shengqin	23.506–20.925	(silver) Silver	

=== Asian Championships ===
Women's speed

Year	Venue	Opponent	Time (s)	Result	Ref
2019	Pakansari Stadium, Bogor, Indonesia	(China) Tian Peiyang	7.700–8.30	(gold) Gold	
2022	Seoul, South Korea	(Indonesia) Desak Made Rita Kusuma Dewi	9.00–9.22	(gold) Gold	

Women's speed relay

Year	Venue	Partner	Opponent	Time (s)	Result	Ref
2019	Pakansari Stadium, Bogor, Indonesia	(Indonesia) Rajiah Sallsabillah (Indonesia) Amanda Narda Mutia	(Indonesia) Mudji Mulyani (Indonesia) Dhorifatus Syafi'iyah (Indonesia) Devi Berthdigna	24.942–28.015	(gold) Gold	

Women's combined

Year	Venue	Points	Result	Ref
2019	Pakansari Stadium, Bogor, Indonesia	15+	(gold) Gold	

=== IFSC Climbing World Cup ===
Women's speed

Year	Venue	Opponent	Time (s)	Result	Ref
2023	Chamonix, France	(China) Zhang Shaoqin	7.16–7.17	(bronze) Bronze	
