= Desak Made Rita Kusuma Dewi =

Indonesian rock climber

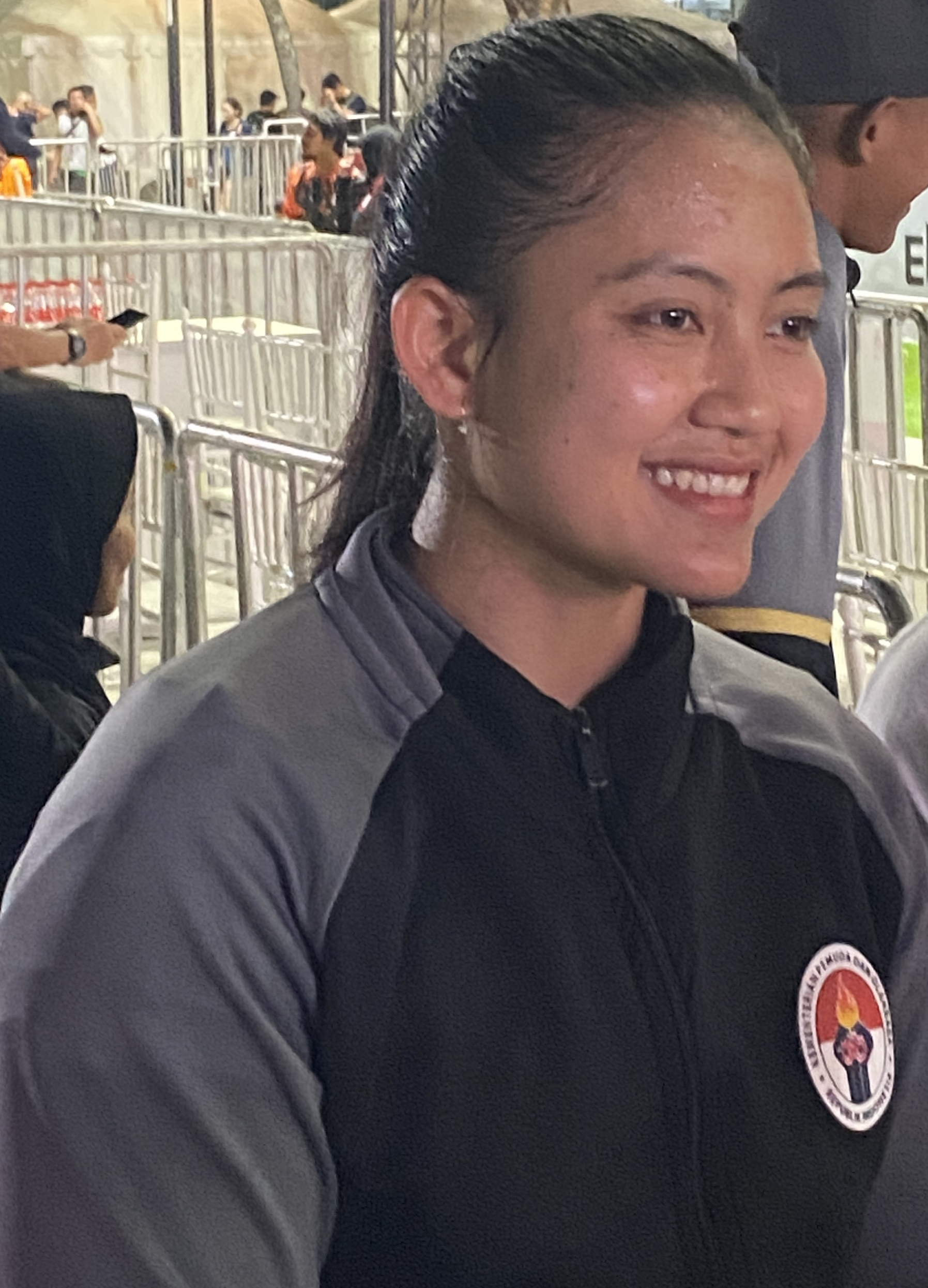
- Desak in 2023

Personal information
- Nickname: Rita
- Nationality: Indonesian
- Born: 24 January 2001 (age 25) Buleleng, Bali, Indonesia
- Home town: Singaraja, Bali, Indonesia
- Education: Ganesha University of Education
- Years active: 2018–present
- Height: 165 cm (5 ft 5 in)

Climbing career
- Type of climber: Competition speed climbing

Sport
- Coached by: Hendra Basir
Medal record
Women's competition climbing
Representing Indonesia
World Games
Gold medal – first place	2025 Chengdu	Speed single 4
World Championships
Gold medal – first place	2023 Bern	Speed
World Cup (Overall)
Third place	2025	Speed
Third place	2026	Speed
Asian Games
Gold medal – first place	2022 Hangzhou	Speed
Gold medal – first place	2026 Aichi–Nagoya	Speed
Silver medal – second place	2022 Hangzhou	Speed relay
Asian Championships
Gold medal – first place	2026 Meishan	Speed
Silver medal – second place	2022 Seoul	Speed
Asian Beach Games
Gold medal – first place	2026 Sanya	Speed relay

Desak Made Rita Kusuma Dewi (born 24 January 2001) is an Indonesian competition climber specializing in competition speed climbing. She is the World Champions winning the title in 2023, and two times Asian Games gold medalists winning the title in 2023 and 2026. In November 2023, Desak was named to the BBC's 100 Women list.

== Competition climbing career ==
Kusuma Dewi finished tenth overall in speed at the 2022 IFSC Climbing World Cup and has two World Cup podium finishes overall. She finished as runner-up at 2022 IFSC Climbing Asian Championships in Seoul, South Korea. She won the gold medal in the women's speed event at the 2023 IFSC Climbing World Championships in August 2023.

At the 2024 Olympics, Desak won her heat against Piper Kelly in the elimination round of qualifications with the time of 6.38. She ended up in sixth place after losing 0.003 seconds to Deng Lijuan of China in the quarterfinals setting a personal best with a time of 6.369.

== Personal life ==
Kusuma Dewi began attending Ganesha University of Education in 2019.

== Achievements ==
=== World Championships ===
Women's speed

Year	Venue	Opponent	Time (s)	Result	Ref
2023	PostFinance Arena, Bern, Switzerland	(United States) Emma Hunt	6.49–6.67	(gold) Gold	

=== Asian Games ===
Women's speed

Year	Venue	Opponent	Time (s)	Result	Ref
2022	Keqiao Yangshan Sport Climbing Centre, Shaoxing, China	(China) Deng Lijuan	6.364–6.435	(gold) Gold	
2026	Portmesse Nagoya Exhibition Hall 1, Aichi Prefecture, Japan	(China) Deng Lijuan	6.062–6.064	(gold) Gold	

Women's speed relay

Year	Venue	Partner	Opponent	Time (s)	Result	Ref
2022	Keqiao Yangshan Sport Climbing Centre, Shaoxing, China	(Indonesia) Nurul Iqamah (Indonesia) Alivany Ver Khadijah (Indonesia) Rajiah Sallsabillah	(China) Deng Lijuan (China) Niu Di (China) Zhang Shaoqin (China) Wang Shengqin	23.506–20.925	(silver) Silver	

=== Asian Championships ===
Women's speed

Year	Venue	Opponent	Time (s)	Result	Ref
2022	Seoul, South Korea	(Indonesia) Nurul Iqamah	9.22–9.00	(silver) Silver	
2026	Meishan, China	(China) Zhou Yafei	6.07–6.47	(gold) Gold	

=== IFSC Climbing World Cup ===
Women's speed

Year	Venue	Opponent	Time (s)	Result	Ref
2022	Villars, Switzerland	(Poland) Anna Brozek	7.06–7.39	(bronze) Bronze	
2022	Chamonix, France	(Indonesia) Rajiah Sallsabillah	6.82–6.90	(bronze) Bronze	
2023	Seoul, South Korea	(Poland) Aleksandra Kałucka	6.60–6.71	(bronze) Bronze	
2023	Jakarta, Indonesia	(Poland) Aleksandra Mirosław	6.52–6.43	(silver) Silver	
2023	Salt Lake City, United States	(Poland) Aleksandra Mirosław	6.82–6.43	(silver) Silver	
2025	Kraków, Poland	(United States) Emma Hunt	6.27–7.56	(gold) Gold	
2025	Chamonix, France	(Poland) Aleksandra Mirosław	6.46–6.19	(silver) Silver	
2026	Wujiang, China	(Poland) Natalia Kałucka	6.17–6.39	(bronze) Bronze	
2026	Kraków, Poland	(Poland) Natalia Kałucka	6.54–6.62	(gold) Gold	
2026	Chamonix, France	(Italy) Giulia Randi	6.22–6.51	(gold) Gold	

Women's speed relay

Year	Venue	Partner	Opponent	Time (s)	Result	Ref
2026	Kraków, Poland	(Indonesia) Rajiah Sallsabillah	(Spain) Leslie Adriana Romero Pérez (Spain) Carla Martínez Vidal	13.14–13.52	(bronze) Bronze	

Mixed speed relay

Year	Venue	Partner	Opponent	Time (s)	Result	Ref
2026	Kraków, Poland	(Indonesia) Antasyafi Robby Al Hilmi	(United States) Samuel Watson (United States) Emma Hunt	11.30–10.89	(silver) Silver	

=== NEOM Beach Games ===
Women's speed

Year	Venue	Opponent	Time (s)	Result	Ref
2023	Gayal Beach, Neom, Saudi Arabia	(Indonesia) Rajiah Sallsabillah	6.88–6.726	(silver) Silver	

== Rankings ==
=== IFSC Climbing World Cup ===
Discipline	2021	2022	2023	2024	2025	2026
Speed	10	10	4	69	3	3
