= Pool at the 2025 World Games =

- Venue: Qinglong Lake
- Dates: 10–14 August 2025
- No. of events: 3
- Competitors: 40 from 23 nations

The pool competition at the 2025 World Games took place from 7 to 16 August 2025 at the Qinglong Lake in Chengdu, China. The competition, which belongs to the cue sports discipline, added a mixed heyball event to the male and female events that have been held since 2001.

== Qualification ==
A total of 80 athletes qualified for the cue sports events. 12 men and 12 women qualified specifically for the 10-ball events, while 16 athletes qualified for the heyball mixed event.

== Participating nations ==
- Argentina (1)
- Australia (2)
- Canada (1)
- Chile (1)
- China (8)
- Chinese Taipei (2)
- Costa Rica (1)
- Estonia (1)
- Germany (3)
- Hungary (1)
- Individual Neutral Athletes (1)
- India (1)
- Netherlands (1)
- Peru (1)
- Philippines (3)
- Poland (1)
- Samoa (1)
- Singapore (1)
- South Africa (2)
- Spain (1)
- Sweden (1)
- Thailand (1)
- United States (4)

== Medal table ==
* Host nation (China)

Rank	Nation	Gold	Silver	Bronze	Total
1	China*	2	0	2	4
2	Hungary	1	0	0	1
3	Peru	0	1	0	1
3	Philippines	0	1	0	1
3	South Africa	0	1	0	1
6	Germany	0	0	1	1
Totals (6 entries)		3	3	3	9

== Medalists ==
Event	Gold	Silver	Bronze
Men's 10-ball	Olivér Szolnoki; Hungary	Gerson Martínez; Peru	Joshua Filler; Germany
Women's 10-ball	Han Yu; China	Chezka Centeno; Philippines	Liu Shasha; China
Heyball	Zhang Taiyi; China	Jason Theron; South Africa	Tang Chunxiao; China
