= Dragon boat at the 2025 World Games =

- Venue: Xinglong Lake
- Dates: 9–10 August 2025
- No. of events: 6
- Competitors: 12 teams from 12 nations

The dragon boat competition at the 2025 World Games took place from 9 to 10 August 2025, in Chengdu in China, at the Xinglong Lake. The competition had six mixed events. This marked the first games where dragon boat was an official sport after being and invitational one at the 2005 and 2009 World Games.

== Qualification ==
A total of twelve teams qualified, one quota for the host nation, two from the 2024 ICF Dragon Boat World Cup, and nine from the 2024 ICF Dragon Boat World Championships.

Event	Location	Dates	Total places	Qualified NOCs
Mixed– 12 teams
Host nation	—N/a	—N/a	1	China
2024 ICF Dragon Boat World Cup	(China) Yichang	24–27 October 2024	2	Indonesia; Thailand
2024 ICF Dragon Boat World; Championships	(Philippines) Puerto; Princesa	30 October– 3 November 2024	9	Cambodia; Chinese Taipei; Czech Republic; Hungary; Myanmar; Philippines; South Korea; Spain; Ukraine

== Medal table ==
* Host nation (China)

Rank	Nation	Gold	Silver	Bronze	Total
1	Indonesia	3	2	0	5
2	Ukraine	2	1	1	4
3	Thailand	1	1	2	4
4	China*	0	2	0	2
5	Spain	0	0	2	2
6	Chinese Taipei	0	0	1	1
Totals (6 entries)		6	6	6	18

== Medalists ==
Event	Gold	Silver	Bronze
Mixed 10-seater 200 m	Thailand; Pranchalee Moonkasem; Vipavas Sangthong; Natthapon Kreepkamrai; Chitsanupong Sangpan; Suradet Faengnoi; Kasemsit Borriboonwasin; Phakdee Wannamanee; Jaruwan Chaikan; Praewpan Kawsri; Sukanya Poradok; Nipaporn Nopsri; Sukon Boon-em	China; Peng Chun; Zeng Bolun; Ji Shengchang; Zhang Peng; Wabu Youzhuacier; Dong Binrui; Wu Shuhan; Wu Siqi; Yang Jie; Xu Jiayu; Luo Meng; Wang Shougang	Ukraine; Olesia Matviienko; Viktor Svyrydiuk; Mykola Verkhovetskyi; Yurii Bardashevskyi; Serhii Semeniuk; Oleksandr Kalmus; Danylo Kukharuk; Anastasiia Mazurenko; Olha Buraho; Snizhana Zhyhailo; Kateryna Petrenko; Olena Skvortsova
Mixed 10-seater 500 m	Indonesia; Riska Andriyani; Harjito Mugi; Sutrisno; Irwan; Dapit; Roby Kuswandi; Dayumin; Wahyuni Reski; Maryati; Firmansyah Yuda; Hafiza Nadia; Nur Meni	Ukraine; Olesia Matviienko; Viktor Svyrydiuk; Mykola Verkhovetskyi; Yurii Bardashevskyi; Serhii Semeniuk; Oleksandr Kalmus; Danylo Kukharuk; Anastasiia Mazurenko; Olha Buraho; Snizhana Zhyhailo; Kateryna Petrenko; Olena Skvortsova	Thailand; Pranchalee Moonkasem; Vipavas Sangthong; Natthapon Kreepkamrai; Chitsanupong Sangpan; Suradet Faengnoi; Kasemsit Borriboonwasin; Phakdee Wannamanee; Jaruwan Chaikan; Praewpan Kawsri; Sukanya Poradok; Nipaporn Nopsri; Sukon Boon-em
Mixed 10-seater 2000 m	Ukraine; Olesia Matviienko; Viktor Svyrydiuk; Mykola Verkhovetskyi; Yurii Bardashevskyi; Serhii Semeniuk; Oleksandr Kalmus; Danylo Kukharuk; Anastasiia Mazurenko; Olha Buraho; Snizhana Zhyhailo; Kateryna Petrenko; Olena Skvortsova	Indonesia; Riska Andriyani; Harjito Mugi; Sutrisno; Irwan; Dapit; Roby Kuswandi; Dayumin; Wahyuni Reski; Maryati; Firmansyah Yuda; Hafiza Nadia; Nur Meni	Spain; Loreto Macho; Miguel Ordóñez; Pablo Silva; Iago Monteagudo; Jakub Michalowicz; Jorge Alonso; Nerea Novo; Lara Feijóo; Carmen Villar; Noa Conde Franco; Antia Landeira; Luis Ourille
Open 8-seater 200 m	Indonesia; Riska Andriyani; Irwan; Dapit; Roby Kuswandi; Dayumin; Wahyuni Reski; Maryati; Sutrisno; Hafiza Nadia; Nur Meni	Thailand; Praewpan Kawsri; Chitsanupong Sangpan; Suradet Faengnoi; Kasemsit Borriboonwasin; Phakdee Wannamanee; Jaruwan Chaikan; Natthapon Kreepkamrai; Sukanya Poradok; Nipaporn Nopsri; Pranchalee Moonkasem	Chinese Taipei; Wu Wei-ting; Lin Sheng-ru; Chuang Ying-chieh; Chen Tzu-hsien; Chen Le-en; Chou Chih-wei; Lahok Iya; Chien Cheng-yen; Lee Chun-lin; Yin Wan-ting
Open 8-seater 500 m	Ukraine; Olesia Matviienko; Yurii Bardashevskyi; Serhii Semeniuk; Oleksandr Kalmus; Danylo Kukharuk; Mykola Verkhovetskyi; Olha Buraho; Viktor Svyrydiuk; Kateryna Petrenko; Olena Skvortsova	Indonesia; Riska Andriyani; Irwan; Dapit; Roby Kuswandi; Dayumin; Wahyuni Reski; Maryati; Sutrisno; Hafiza Nadia; Nur Meni	Thailand; Praewpan Kawsri; Chitsanupong Sangpan; Suradet Faengnoi; Kasemsit Borriboonwasin; Phakdee Wannamanee; Jaruwan Chaikan; Natthapon Kreepkamrai; Sukanya Poradok; Nipaporn Nopsri; Pranchalee Moonkasem
Open 8-seater 2000 m	Indonesia; Riska Andriyani; Irwan; Dapit; Roby Kuswandi; Dayumin; Wahyuni Reski; Maryati; Sutrisno; Hafiza Nadia; Nur Meni	China; Peng Chun; Zhang Peng; Ji Shengchang; Dong Binrui; Wu Shuhan; Zeng Bolun; Wabu Youzhuacier; Xu Jiayu; Luo Meng; Wang Shougang	Spain; Loreto Macho; Iago Monteagudo; Jakub Michalowicz; Luis Ourille; Nerea Novo; Lara Feijóo; Carmen Villar; Pablo Silva; Antia Landeira; Noa Conde Franco

== Results ==
=== Mixed 10-seater ===
==== 200 m ====
Heats

The results were as follows:

Heat 1				Heat 2				Notes
Rank	Lane	Nation	Time	Rank	Lane	Nation	Time	Notes
1	6	Indonesia (INA)	49.17	1	1	Myanmar (MYA)	49.22	F
2	1	Ukraine (UKR)	49.98	2	6	China (CHN)	50.32	F
3	5	Chinese Taipei (TPE)	50.12	3	4	Thailand (THA)	50.43	SF
4	4	Philippines (PHI)	52.07	4	3	Spain (ESP)	50.70	SF
5	3	Cambodia (CAM)	53.19	5	2	Czech Republic (CZE)	57.34	SF
6	2	South Korea (KOR)	1:08.83	—N/a	5	Hungary (HUN)	DSQ	

Semifinals

The results were as follows:

Rank	Lane	Nation	Time	Notes
1	3	Chinese Taipei (TPE)	49.53	F
2	4	Thailand (THA)	49.99	F
3	2	Spain (ESP)	50.69	
4	5	Philippines (PHI)	50.80	
5	1	Cambodia (CAM)	52.68	
6	6	Czech Republic (CZE)	53.79	

Final

The results were as follows:

Rank	Lane	Nation	Time
1st place, gold medalist(s)	6	Thailand (THA)	47.15
2nd place, silver medalist(s)	5	China (CHN)	48.81
3rd place, bronze medalist(s)	2	Ukraine (UKR)	48.85
4	1	Chinese Taipei (TPE)	49.03
5	4	Indonesia (INA)	49.28
6	3	Myanmar (MYA)	49.38

==== 500 m ====
Heats

The results were as follows:

Heat 1				Heat 2				Notes
Rank	Lane	Nation	Time	Rank	Lane	Nation	Time	Notes
1	1	China (CHN)	2:09.16	1	1	Thailand (THA)	2:07.88	F
2	6	Spain (ESP)	2:09.98	2	6	Ukraine (UKR)	2:08.32	F
3	2	Chinese Taipei (TPE)	2:10.55	3	4	Indonesia (INA)	2:08.42	SF
4	5	Czech Republic (CZE)	2:11.19	4	3	Hungary (HUN)	2:10.99	SF
5	4	Myanmar (MYA)	2:14.26	5	5	Philippines (PHI)	2:13.08	SF
6	3	South Korea (KOR)	2:38.80	6	2	Cambodia (CAM)	2:35.05	

Semifinals

The results were as follows:

Rank	Lane	Nation	Time	Notes
1	3	Indonesia (INA)	2:06.66	F
2	2	Hungary (HUN)	2:07.93	F
3	6	Myanmar (MYA)	2:08.19	
4	1	Philippines (PHI)	2:11.20	
5	5	Czech Republic (CZE)	2:17.73	
6	4	Chinese Taipei (TPE)	2:37.17	

Final

The results were as follows:

Rank	Lane	Nation	Time
1st place, gold medalist(s)	6	Indonesia (INA)	2:06.64
2nd place, silver medalist(s)	5	Ukraine (UKR)	2:07.02
3rd place, bronze medalist(s)	2	Thailand (THA)	2:07.80
4	2	Spain (ESP)	2:09.11
5	1	Hungary (HUN)	2:09.12
6	4	China (CHN)	2:09.28

==== 2000 m ====
The results were as follows:

Rank	Lane	Nation	Time
1st place, gold medalist(s)	6	Ukraine (UKR)	9:19.87
2nd place, silver medalist(s)	8	Indonesia (INA)	9:22.43
3rd place, bronze medalist(s)	1	Spain (ESP)	9:23.84
4	3	Hungary (HUN)	9:26.57
5	9	Czech Republic (CZE)	9:28.09
6	5	China (CHN)	9:28.80
7	2	Chinese Taipei (TPE)	9:29.04
8	7	Thailand (THA)	9:31.06
9	4	Myanmar (MYA)	9:33.86
10	11	Philippines (PHI)	9:40.57
11	12	South Korea (KOR)	10:00.71
—N/a	10	Cambodia (CAM)	DSQ

=== Open 8-seater ===
==== 200 m ====
Heats

The results were as follows:

Heat 1				Heat 2				Notes
Rank	Lane	Nation	Time	Rank	Lane	Nation	Time	Notes
1	5	Myanmar (MYA)	50.76	1	5	Indonesia (INA)	47.10	F
2	4	Cambodia (CAM)	52.64	2	2	Thailand (THA)	47.30	F
3	1	South Korea (KOR)	1:08.79	3	6	Chinese Taipei (TPE)	48.73	SF
4	2	Ukraine (UKR)	1:10.78	4	1	Spain (ESP)	49.18	SF
5	6	Hungary (HUN)	1:35.12	5	4	China (CHN)	49.61	SF
6	3	Czech Republic (CZE)	1:41.74	6	3	Philippines (PHI)	50.94	

Semifinals

The results were as follows:

Rank	Lane	Nation	Time	Notes
1	4	Chinese Taipei (TPE)	48.59	F
2	2	Ukraine (UKR)	49.20	F
3	5	Spain (ESP)	49.32	
4	1	Hungary (HUN)	50.78	
5	3	South Korea (KOR)	53.76	
6	6	China (CHN)	57.15	

Final

The results were as follows:

Rank	Lane	Nation	Time
1st place, gold medalist(s)	4	Indonesia (INA)	45.79
2nd place, silver medalist(s)	2	Thailand (THA)	46.32
3rd place, bronze medalist(s)	1	Chinese Taipei (TPE)	47.27
4	3	Myanmar (MYA)	47.37
5	6	Ukraine (UKR)	47.39
6	5	Cambodia (CAM)	51.05

==== 500 m ====
Heats

The results were as follows:

Heat 1				Heat 2				Notes
Rank	Lane	Nation	Time	Rank	Lane	Nation	Time	Notes
1	6	Myanmar (MYA)	2:07.43	1	2	Indonesia (INA)	2:06.67	F
2	3	Thailand (THA)	2:07.56	2	4	Ukraine (UKR)	2:07.76	F
3	2	Spain (ESP)	2:09.54	3	1	Czech Republic (CZE)	2:13.69	SF
4	4	Hungary (HUN)	2:11.27	4	3	Chinese Taipei (TPE)	2:14.59	SF
5	5	China (CHN)	2:12.15	5	5	South Korea (KOR)	2:20.86	SF
6	1	Philippines (PHI)	2:13.63	6	6	Cambodia (CAM)	2:23.73	

Semifinals

The results were as follows:

Rank	Lane	Nation	Time	Notes
1	2	Hungary (HUN)	2:07.43	F
2	3	Spain (ESP)	2:07.95	F
3	4	Czech Republic (CZE)	2:10.73	
4	6	South Korea (KOR)	2:15.39	
5	1	China (CHN)	2:23.89	
6	5	Chinese Taipei (TPE)	2:29.99	

Final

The results were as follows:

Rank	Lane	Nation	Time
1st place, gold medalist(s)	5	Ukraine (UKR)	2:05.53
2nd place, silver medalist(s)	3	Indonesia (INA)	2:05.71
3rd place, bronze medalist(s)	2	Thailand (THA)	2:06.48
4	4	Myanmar (MYA)	2:07.50
5	1	Spain (ESP)	2:08.20
6	6	Hungary (HUN)	2:09.32

==== 2000 m ====
The results were as follows:

Rank	Lane	Nation	Time
1st place, gold medalist(s)	1	Indonesia (INA)	9:08.12
2nd place, silver medalist(s)	2	China (CHN)	9:19.22
3rd place, bronze medalist(s)	10	Spain (ESP)	9:23.75
4	12	Ukraine (UKR)	9:28.25
5	8	Thailand (THA)	9:31.48
6	11	Czech Republic (CZE)	9:32.11
7	9	Myanmar (MYA)	9:33.35
8	5	Hungary (HUN)	9:33.65
9	6	Philippines (PHI)	9:37.26
10	7	Cambodia (CAM)	9:41.58
11	7	South Korea (KOR)	9:59.68
12	4	Chinese Taipei (TPE)	11:14.75
