= Beatrice Colli =

Chinese speed climber (born 2004)

Personal information
- Full name: Beatrice Anna Colli
- Nickname: Bea
- Born: 10 October 2004 (age 21)
- Years active: 2018–present

Climbing career
- Type of climber: Competition speed climbing

Sport
- Country: Italy
Medal record
Women's competition climbing
Representing Italy
European Championships
Gold medal – first place	2026 Laval	Speed
European Games
Bronze medal – third place	2023 Kraków–Małopolska	Speed

Beatrice Anna Colli (born 10 October 2004) is an Italian competition speed climber. She represented Italy at the 2024 Summer Olympics.

== Career ==
Colli competed at the 2021 IFSC Climbing World Youth Championships and won a gold medal in the speed event. She repeated as champion at the 2022 IFSC Climbing World Youth Championships, becoming the first Italian athlete to win consecutive championships at the World Climbing Youth Championship.

In June 2023, she competed at the 2023 European Games and won a bronze medal in the speed event.

She qualified to represent Italy at the 2024 Summer Olympics. She competed in the speed event and finished in ninth place. During the qualification elimination heats she set a personal best best time of 6.84 seconds. On 11 September 2024, she underwent surgery on her left heel for Haglund's syndrome. She was diagnosed with the disease in 2020 and it prevented her from wearing conventional shoes and performing fundamental gestures in competition.

In August 2025, she competed at the 2025 World Games in both the traditional speed single and speed single 4 events. During the speed single 4 qualification seeding heats she had the seventh fastest time of 7.09 seconds. She was eliminated in the quarterfinals.

On 14 March 2026, during the first race of the 2026 Italian Cup, she set an Italian record time of 6.81 seconds. In August 2026, she competed at the World Climbing Europe Championship and won a gold medal in the speed event with a new Italian record time of 6.45 seconds. She defeated her idol and Olympic gold medalist Aleksandra Mirosław in the semifinals.
