= Powerboating at the 2025 World Games =

- Venue: Sancha Lake
- Dates: 15–17 August 2025
- No. of events: 3
- Competitors: 43 from 15 nations

The powerboating competition at the 2025 World Games took place from 15 to 17 August 2025 at the Ma'anshan Arena of the Sancha Lake in Chengdu, China. The discipline made its debut at the 2025 games with three events, two singles (men and women) and one mixed (Nations Cup).

== Qualification ==
A total of 43 athletes (24 men and 19 women) qualified to the events based on a series of individual qualifying races.

== Participating nations ==
- Belgium (2)
- Canada (2)
- Cyprus (1)
- China (8)
- Czech Republic (4)
- Germany (2)
- Japan (3)
- Kuwait (2)
- Mexico (2)
- Poland (2)
- Slovakia (4)
- South Korea (4)
- Sweden (2)
- Thailand (1)
- United States (4)

== Medal table ==
* Host nation (China)

Rank	Nation	Gold	Silver	Bronze	Total
1	Czech Republic	3	0	0	3
2	China*	0	2	1	3
3	Poland	0	1	0	1
4	Slovakia	0	0	2	2
Totals (4 entries)		3	3	3	9

== Medalists ==
Event	Gold	Silver	Bronze
MotoSurf Single Men	Lukáš Záhorský; Czech Republic	Zhang Maozhu; China	Feng Zhanghao; China
MotoSurf Single Women	Eliška Matoušková; Czech Republic	Gao Jiayin; China	Emma Strculová; Slovakia
Nations Cup	Czech Republic; Eliška Matoušková; Lukáš Záhorský	Poland; Rozalia Janora; Arkadiusz Janora	Slovakia; Sára Žuborová; Marek Skamla
