= Snooker at the 2025 World Games =

- Venue: Qinglong Lake
- Dates: 10–14 August 2025
- No. of events: 2
- Competitors: 20 from 14 nations

The snooker competition at the 2025 World Games took place from 10 to 14 August 2025 at the Qinglong Lake in Chengdu, China. The competition, which belongs to the cue sports discipline, added a female snooker event to the male event that has been held since 2001.

== Qualification ==
A total of 80 athletes qualified for the cue sports events. 12 men and 8 women qualified specifically for the snooker events.

== Participating nations ==
- Belgium (1)
- China (3)
- Cyprus (1)
- Egypt (1)
- Great Britain (1)
- Germany (1)
- Hong Kong (2)
- India (3)
- Iran (1)
- Mongolia (1)
- Pakistan (1)
- Poland (1)
- Thailand (2)
- United Arab Emirates (1)

== Medal table ==
* Host nation (China)

Rank	Nation	Gold	Silver	Bronze	Total
1	China*	2	0	0	2
2	Thailand	0	1	1	2
3	Cyprus	0	1	0	1
4	Germany	0	0	1	1
Totals (4 entries)		2	2	2	6

== Medalists ==
Event	Gold	Silver	Bronze
Men's 15-reds	Xiao Guodong; China	Michael Georgiou; Cyprus	Alexander Widau; Germany
Women's 6-reds	Bai Yulu; China	Narucha Phoemphul; Thailand	Ploychompoo Laokiatphong; Thailand
