= Thailand at the 2025 World Games =

- IOC code: THA
- NOC: National Olympic Committee of Thailand

in Chengdu, China 7 August 2025 – 17 August 2025
- Competitors: 64 (21 men and 43 women) in 15 sports and 34 events
- Medals Ranked 19th: Gold 4 Silver 4 Bronze 7 Total 15

World Games appearances (overview)
- 1981; 1985; 1989; 1993; 1997; 2001; 2005; 2009; 2013; 2017; 2022; 2025

Thailand competed at the 2025 World Games held in Chengdu, China from 7 to 17 August 2025. Athletes representing Thailand won four gold medals,four silver medals and seven bronze medals. The country finished in 19th place in the medal table.

== Medalists ==
Medal	Name	Sport	Event	Date
Gold	Mixed Team	Dragon boat	Mixed 10-seater 200 metres	10 August
Gold	Warawut Saengsriruang; Lalita Yuennan	Ju-jitsu	Mixed Duo Team Open	10 August
Gold	Warut Netpong; Charatchai Kitpongsri	Ju-jitsu	Mixed Duo Show Open	11 August
Gold	Orapa Senatham	Ju-jitsu	Women's 63 kg Fighting	11 August
Silver	Mixed Team	Dragon boat	Open 8-seater 200 metres	10 August
Silver	Kullanat Aonok	Muaythai	Women's -48 kg	10 August
Silver	Narucha Phoemphul	Billards sports	Snooker Women's 6-reds	13 August
Silver	Ratchata Khamdee; Nantawan Fueangsanit	Boules sports	Mixed Petanque Classic Doubles	17 August
Bronze	Mixed Team	Dragon boat	Open 8-seater 500 metres	10 August
Bronze	Mixed Team	Dragon boat	Mixed 10-seater 500 metres	10 August
Bronze	Kaewrudee Kamtakrapoom	Muaythai	Women's -60 kg	10 August
Bronze	Nuchanat Singchalad	Ju-jitsu	Women's -52 kg Fighting	11 August
Bronze	Ploychompoo Laokiatphong	Billards sports	Snooker Women's 6-reds	12 August
Bronze	Ratchata Khamdee	Boules sports	Men's Petanque Precision Shooting	16 August
Bronze	Nantawan Fueangsanit	Boules sports	Women's Petanque Precision Shooting	16 August

Medals by sport
Sport	1st place, gold medalist(s)	2nd place, silver medalist(s)	3rd place, bronze medalist(s)	Total
Ju-jitsu	3	0	1	4
Dragon boat	1	1	2	4
Boules sports	0	1	2	3
Billiard sports	0	1	1	2
Muaythai	0	1	1	2
Total	4	4	7	15

== Competitors ==
The following is the list of number of competitors in the Games.

Sport	Men	Women	Total
Air sports	0	1	1
Billards	0	3	3
Boules sports	1	1	2
Canoe dragon boat	6	6	12
Finswimming	1	0	1
Floorball	0	14	14
Gymnastics	0	1	1
Ju-jitsu	1	6	7
Kickboxing	1	0	1
Muaythai	1	1	2
Powerboating	1	0	1
Powerlifting	1	0	1
Roller sports	1	2	3
Wakeboarding	2	2	4
Total	16	37	53

== Air sports ==
Athlete	Event	Qualification Round		Round of 32		Round of 16		Repechage Round		Quarterfinals		Semifinals		Final		Final Rank
Athlete	Event	Result	Rank	Result	Rank	Result	Rank	Result	Rank	Result	Rank	Result	Rank	Result	Rank	Final Rank
Wanraya Wannapong	Drone racing	36.294	28	1:52.001	2	DNF		1:48.172	3	Did not advance						23

== Billiards sports ==
Pool

Athlete	Event	Round of 16	Quarterfinals	Semifinals	Final / BM / PF	
Athlete	Event	Opposition Result	Opposition Result	Opposition Result	Opposition Result	Rank
Waratthanun Sukritthanes	Mixed Heyball Pool	Theron (RSA); L 3–5	Did not advance		Yu (SGP); W 5–3	9

Snooker

Athlete	Event	Preliminary Round			Semifinals	Final / BM / PF	
Athlete	Event	Opposition Result	Opposition Result	Opposition Result	Opposition Result	Opposition Result	Rank
Ploychompoo Laokiatphong	Women's 6-reds	Bayarsaikhan (MGL); W 2–1	Bai (CHN); W 2–0	Fong (HKG); W 2–0	Narucha (THA); L 0–2	Jans (BEL); W 2–1	3rd place, bronze medalist(s)
Narucha Phoemphul	Women's 6-reds	Jans (BEL); L 0–2	Chethan (IND); W 2–0	So (HKG); W 2–1	Ploychompoo (THA); W 2–0	Bai (CHN); L 0–2	2nd place, silver medalist(s)

== Boules sports ==
Men

Athlete	Event	Qualification		Semifinals	Final / BM	
Athlete	Event	Result	Rank	Opposition Result	Opposition Result	Rank
Ratchata Khamdee	Petanque Precision Shooting	59	1	Chiapello (ITA); L 31–43	Bougriba (TUN); W 44–32	3rd place, bronze medalist(s)

Women

Athlete	Event	Qualification		Semifinals	Final / BM	
Athlete	Event	Result	Rank	Opposition Result	Opposition Result	Rank
Nantawan Fueangsanit	Petanque Precision Shooting	38	1	Yan (CHN); L 29–35	Poinsot (FRA); W 28–23	3rd place, bronze medalist(s)

Mixed

Athlete	Event	Qualification				Semifinals	Final / BM	
Athlete	Event	Opposition Result	Opposition Result	Opposition Result	Rank	Opposition Result	Opposition Result	Rank
Ratchata Khamdee; Nantawan Fueangsanit	Petanque Classic Doubles	Vo; Kim (VIE); W 13–8	Bougriba; Mattoussi (TUN); L 9–10	Vo; Kim (VIE); W 13–2	2	Desport; Poinsot (FRA); W 13–2	Bougriba; Mattoussi (TUN); L 9–10	2nd place, silver medalist(s)

== Dragon boat ==
Team	Event	Heat		Semifinal		Final	
Team	Event	Result	Rank	Result	Rank	Result	Rank
Thailand	Open 8-seater 200m	47.30	2 F	Bye		46.32	2nd place, silver medalist(s)
Thailand	Open 8-seater 500m	2:07.56	2 F	Bye		2:06.48	3rd place, bronze medalist(s)
Thailand	Open 8-seater 2000m	—N/a				9:31.48	5
Thailand	Mixed 10-seater 200m	50.43	3 SF	49.99	2 F	47.15	1st place, gold medalist(s)
Thailand	Mixed 10-seater 500m	2:07.88	1 F	Bye		2:07.80	3rd place, bronze medalist(s)
Thailand	Mixed 10-seater 2000m	—N/a				9:31.06	8

== Finswimming ==
Athlete	Event	Time	Rank
Pongpanod Trithan	Men's 100 metre bi-fins	41.69	5

== Floorball ==
Summary

Team	Event	Preliminary round				Semifinal	Final / BM / PF	
Team	Event	Opposition Result	Opposition Result	Opposition Result	Rank	Opposition Result	Opposition Result	Rank
Thailand women	Women's tournament	Sweden; L 2–21	Switzerland; L 1–19	Slovakia; L 0–14	4 PF	Did not advance	Canada; W 7–4	7

== Gymnastics ==
Athlete	Event	Qualification round					Final	
Athlete	Event	Result	Difficulty	Execution	Total	Rank	Result	Rank
Sirinnaphat Atchariyadamrongkul	Parkour Women's Speed	1:09.27	—N/a			9	Did not advance	
Sirinnaphat Atchariyadamrongkul	Parkour Women's Freestyle	—N/a	4.3	11.4	15.7	10	Did not advance	

== Ju-jitsu ==
Men

Athlete	Event	Elimination round			Round of 16	Quarterfinals	Semifinal	Final/BM	Rank
Athlete	Event	Opposition Result	Opposition Result	Rank	Opposition Result	Opposition Result	Opposition Result	Opposition Result	Rank
Kampanart Polput	-77 kg Ne-Waza	Bolatbek (KAZ); L PTS 0–7	Al-Awlaqi (UAE); L SUB 0–50	3	Did not advance				

Women

Athlete	Event	Elimination round			Round of 16	Quarterfinals	Semifinal	Final/BM	Rank
Athlete	Event	Opposition Result	Opposition Result	Rank	Opposition Result	Opposition Result	Opposition Result	Opposition Result	Rank
Nuchanat Singchalad	-52 kg Fighting	Wu (TPE); W DSQ 50–0	Farne (ITA); L PTS 4–10	2	—N/a		Gaspard (FRA); L PTS 11–12	Staub (SUI); W PTS 6–2	3rd place, bronze medalist(s)
Orapa Senatham	-63 kg Fighting	Geovanna (BRA); W FI 50–0	Freudenberger (GER); L PTS 5–15	2	—N/a		Tanzer (DEN); W FI 50–0	Fiorelli (ITA); W FI 50–0	1st place, gold medalist(s)

Mixed

Athlete	Event	Qualification round				Final			Rank
Athlete	Event	Technique	Show	Total	Rank	Technique	Show	Total	Rank
Warut Netpong; Charatchai Kitpongsri	Mixed Duo Show Open	23.0	23.0	46.0	2	25.5	27.5	53.0	1st place, gold medalist(s)

Athlete	Event	Qualification round					Semifinal	Final	Rank
Athlete	Event	Round 1	Round 2	Round 3	Total	Rank	Opposition Result	Opposition Result	Rank
Warawut Saengsriruang; Lalita Yuennan	Mixed Duo Team Open	136	133	173	442	1	Butler; Paszkiewicz (GER); W PTS 212.0–201.0	Riegl; Horak (AUT); W PTS 217.0–210.0	1st place, gold medalist(s)

== Kickboxing ==
Athlete	Event	Quarterfinals	Semifinal	Final/BM	Rank
Athlete	Event	Opposition Result	Opposition Result	Opposition Result	Rank
Jakkrit Kongtook	Men's K1 -63.5 kg	Renita (MDA); W 3–0	Mazur (UKR); L 1–2	Sodikov (UZB); L 0–3	4

== Muaythai ==
Women

Athlete	Event	Quarterfinals	Semifinal	Final/BM	Rank
Athlete	Event	Opposition Result	Opposition Result	Opposition Result	Rank
Kullanat Aonok	-48 kg	Peñol (FIN); W 29–28	Belouarrat (MAR); W 30–27	Liu (CHN); L 27–30	2nd place, silver medalist(s)
Kaewrudee Kamtakrapoom	-60 kg	Grents (EST); W 29–28	Kocakuş (TUR); L 28–29	Bespalova (AIN); W 29–28	3rd place, bronze medalist(s)

== Powerboating ==
Athlete	Event	Qualification		Heat 1			Heat 2			Heat 3			Heat 4			Final		
Athlete	Event	Time	Rank	Time	Points	Rank	Time	Points	Rank	Time	Points	Rank	Time	Points	Rank	Time	Points	Rank
Vatcharasak Jantorn	Men's MotoSurf	0:53.521	13	6:32.580	8	5	6:23.300	6	7	6:30.150	6	7	6:24.330	5	8	Did not advance		

== Powerlifting ==
Classic

Athlete	Event	Exercises			Total weight	Total points	Rank
Athlete	Event	Squat	Bench press	Deadlift	Total weight	Total points	Rank
Kasemsand Senumong	Men's lightweight	220.0	137.5	260.0	617.5	101.32	8

== Roller sports ==
Men

Athlete	Event	Qualification				Quarterfinal	Semifinal	Final / BM
Athlete	Event	Run 1	Run 2	Result	Rank	Opposition Result	Opposition Result	Rank
Parnthep Rujirek	Freestyle inline skating Men's Speed Slalom	4.066	4.850	4.066	4	Lesani (IRI); L 1–2	Did not advance	

Women

Athlete	Event	Qualification				Quarterfinal	Semifinal	Final / BM
Athlete	Event	Run 1	Run 2	Result	Rank	Opposition Result	Opposition Result	Rank
Nichakan Chinupun	Freestyle inline skating Women's Speed Slalom	4.476	4.518	4.476	6	Zhu (CHN); L 0–2	Did not advance	
Sasikan Kongpan	Freestyle inline skating Women's Speed Slalom	DQ	4.793	4.793	9	Did not advance		

== Wakeboarding ==
Men

Athlete	Event	Qualification round		Semifinals		Final	
Athlete	Event	Result	Rank	Result	Rank	Result	Rank
Peeranat Faktongyu	Men's Cable	67.40	1	36.20	6	Did not advance	
BM Jomboon	Men's Skim	80.00	1	78.75	1	57.00	4

Women

Athlete	Event	Qualification round		Semifinals		Final	
Athlete	Event	Result	Rank	Result	Rank	Result	Rank
Bhraebhim Pipatsawaddhi	Women's Cable	52.40	1	58.80	2	68.00	5
Anni Flynn	Women's Skim	55.00	1	63.33	2	23.83	6
