= Long Jianguo =

Chinese speed climber

Personal information
- Years active: 2022–present

Climbing career
- Type of climber: Competition speed climbing

Sport
- Country: China
Medal record
Men's competition climbing
Representing China
World Championships
Gold medal – first place	2025 Seoul	Speed
World Games
Gold medal – first place	2025 Chengdu	Speed single 4
Gold medal – first place	2025 Chengdu	Speed relay
Bronze medal – third place	2025 Chengdu	Speed
Asian Beach Games
Gold medal – first place	2026 Sanya	Speed relay

Long Jianguo is a Chinese competition speed climber.

== Career ==
In August 2025, Jianguo represented China at the 2025 World Games and won gold medals in the speed single 4 and speed relay, and a bronze medal in the speed event. The next month he competed at the 2025 IFSC Climbing World Championships and won a gold medal in the men's speed event.
