= Indonesia at the 2025 World Games =

- IOC code: INA
- NOC: Indonesian Olympic Committee

in Chengdu, China 7 August 2025 – 17 August 2025
- Competitors: 28 (12 men and 16 women) in 6 sports and 22 events
- Medals Ranked 20th: Gold 4 Silver 4 Bronze 1 Total 9

World Games appearances (overview)
- 1981; 1985; 1989; 1993; 1997; 2001; 2005; 2009; 2013; 2017; 2022; 2025

Indonesia competed at the 2025 World Games held in Chengdu, China from 7 to 17 August 2025. Athletes representing Indonesia won four gold medals, four silver medals and one bronze medals. The country finished in 20th place in the medal table.

== Competitors ==
The following is the list of number of competitors in the Games.

| Sport | Men | Women | Total |
|---|---|---|---|
| Dragon boat | 6 | 6 | 12 |
| Karate | 0 | 1 | 1 |
| Kickboxing | 0 | 2 | 2 |
| Sport climbing | 4 | 4 | 8 |
| Duathlon | 0 | 1 | 1 |
| Wushu | 2 | 2 | 4 |
| Total | 12 | 16 | 28 |

== Medalists ==
| Medal | Name | Sport | Event | Date |
|---|---|---|---|---|
| Gold | Riska Andriyani; Irwan; Dapit; Roby Kuswandi; Dayumin; Reski Wahyuni; Maryati Sutrisno; Nadia Hafiza; Nur Meni | Dragon boat | Open 8-seater 2000 metres | 9 August |
| Gold | Riska Andriyani; Irwan; Dapit; Roby Kuswandi; Dayumin; Reski Wahyuni; Maryati Sutrisno; Nadia Hafiza; Nur Meni | Dragon boat | Open 8-seater 200 metres | 10 August |
| Gold | Riska Andriyani; Mugi Harjito; Irwan; Dapit; Roby Kuswandi; Dayumin; Reski Wahyuni; Maryati Sutrisno; Yuda Firmansyah; Nadia Hafiza; Nur Meni | Dragon boat | Mixed 10-seater 500 metres | 10 August |
| Gold | Desak Made Rita Kusuma Dewi | Sport climbing | Women's speed single 4 | 15 August |
| Silver | Seraf Naro Siregar | Wushu | Men's Changquan/Daoshu/Gunshu | 9 August |
| Silver | Riska Andriyani; Irwan; Dapit; Roby Kuswandi; Dayumin; Reski Wahyuni; Maryati Sutrisno; Nadia Hafiza; Nur Meni | Dragon boat | Open 8-seater 500 metres | 10 August |
| Silver | Riska Andriyani; Mugi Harjito; Irwan; Dapit; Roby Kuswandi; Dayumin; Reski Wahyuni; Maryati Sutrisno; Yuda Firmansyah; Nadia Hafiza; Nur Meni | Dragon boat | Mixed 10-seater 2000 metre | 10 August |
| Silver | Kiromal Katibin | Sport climbing | Men's speed single 4 | 15 August |
| Bronze | Rajiah Sallsabillah | Sport climbing | Women's speed single 4 | 15 August |

Medals by sport
| Sport | 1st place, gold medalist(s) | 2nd place, silver medalist(s) | 3rd place, bronze medalist(s) | Total |
| Dragon boat | 3 | 2 | 0 | 5 |
| Sport climbing | 1 | 1 | 1 | 3 |
| Wushu | 0 | 1 | 0 | 1 |
| Total | 4 | 4 | 1 | 9 |

== Award ==
| Award | Athlete | Result | Ref. |
|---|---|---|---|
| Athlete of the Day – 10 August | Indonesian Dragon boat team: Riska Andriyani Mugi Harjito Irwan Dapit Roby Kuswandi Dayumin Reski Wahyuni Maryati Sutrisno Yuda Firmansyah Nadia Hafiza Nur Meni | Honored | |

== Dragon boat ==
Indonesian dragon boat squad qualified one quota from the 2024 ICF Dragon Boat World Cup. The Indonesian team won three gold medals and two silver medals in the sport and became the most successful nation at the Games.

| Athlete | Event | Heats | | Semifinals | | Final | |
| Athlete | Event | Result | Rank | Result | Rank | Result | Rank |
|---|---|---|---|---|---|---|---|
| Riska Andriyani; Irwan; Dapit; Roby Kuswandi; Dayumin; Reski Wahyuni; Maryati; Sutrisno; Nadia Hafiza; Nur Meni | Open 8-seater 200 metres | 47.10 | 1 Q F | Bye | | 45.79 | 1st place, gold medalist(s) |
| Riska Andriyani; Irwan; Dapit; Roby Kuswandi; Dayumin; Reski Wahyuni; Maryati; Sutrisno; Nadia Hafiza; Nur Meni | Open 8-seater 500 metres | 2:06.67 | 1 Q F | Bye | | 2:05.71 | 2nd place, silver medalist(s) |
| Riska Andriyani; Irwan; Dapit; Roby Kuswandi; Dayumin; Reski Wahyuni; Maryati; Sutrisno; Nadia Hafiza; Nur Meni | Open 8-seater 2000 metres | —N/a | | | | 9:08.12 | 1st place, gold medalist(s) |
| Riska Andriyani; Mugi Harjito; Irwan; Dapit; Roby Kuswandi; Dayumin; Reski Wahyuni; Maryati; Sutrisno; Yuda Firmansyah; Nadia Hafiza; Nur Meni | Mixed 10-seater 200 metres | 49.17 | 1 Q F | Bye | | 49.28 | 5 |
| Riska Andriyani; Mugi Harjito; Irwan; Dapit; Roby Kuswandi; Dayumin; Reski Wahyuni; Maryati; Sutrisno; Yuda Firmansyah; Nadia Hafiza; Nur Meni | Mixed 10-seater 500 metres | 2:08.42 | 3 q SF | 2:06.66 | 1 Q | 2:06.64 | 1st place, gold medalist(s) |
| Riska Andriyani; Mugi Harjito; Irwan; Dapit; Roby Kuswandi; Dayumin; Reski Wahyuni; Maryati; Sutrisno; Yuda Firmansyah; Nadia Hafiza; Nur Meni | Mixed 10-seater 2000 metres | —N/a | | | | 9:22.43 | 2nd place, silver medalist(s) |

== Karate ==
One Indonesian karateka qualified as medallist of the 2023 World Karate Championships.

| Athlete | Event | Group stage | | | | Semifinals | Final/Bronze medal bout | |
| Athlete | Event | Opposition Result | Opposition Result | Opposition Result | Rank | Opposition Result | Opposition Result | Rank |
|---|---|---|---|---|---|---|---|---|
| Ceyco Georgia Zefanya | 68 kg | Hendy (EGY); L 1–9 | Li (CHN); W 4–2 | Zaretska (AZE); L 0–10 | 3 | Did not advance | | |

== Kickboxing ==
Two Indonesian kickboxers qualified for the Games.

| Athlete | Event | Quarterfinal | Semifinal | Final | |
| Athlete | Event | Opponent Result | Opponent Result | Opponent Result | Rank |
|---|---|---|---|---|---|
| Andi Maswara | Women's point fighting 50 kg | Aybüke Kılınç (TUR); L 2–12 | Did not advance | | |
| Susanti Ndapataka | Women's K1 style 60 kg | Sofia Oliveira (POR); W 2–1 | Lucia Cmarova (SVK); L 1–2 | Alina Martyniuk (UKR); L 0–3 | 4 |

== Sport climbing ==
A total of eight Indonesian climbers qualified for the Games.

Single

| Athlete | Event | Qualification | | Round of 16 | Quarterfinals | Semifinals | Final / BM | |
| Athlete | Event | Time | Rank | Opposition Result | Opposition Result | Opposition Result | Opposition Result | Rank |
|---|---|---|---|---|---|---|---|---|
| Veddriq Leonardo | Men's single | 5.074 | 6 Q | Watson (USA); L 5.05–4.90 | Did not advance | | | |
| Kiromal Katibin | Men's single | 5.14 | 8 Q | Chu (CHN); L 4.94–5.28 | Did not advance | | | |
| Raharjati Nursamsa | Men's single | 4.93 | 1 Q | Altynbekov (KAZ); W 5.98–8.58 | Chu (CHN); L 4.83–5.11 | Did not advance | | |
| Alfian Muhammad Fajri | Men's single | 5.38 | 18 | Did not advance | | | | |
| Desak Made Rita | Women's single | 6.50 | 2 Q | Fiorio (ITA); W 6.82–8.30 | Kalucka (POL); W 6.50–6.74 | Qin (CHN); L 8.34–6.63 | Zhou (CHN); L 6.34–6.31 | 4 |
| Puja Lestari | Women's single | 7.04 | 9 Q | Zhang (CHN); L 6.97–6.92 | Did not advance | | | |
| Amanda Narda Mutia | Women's single | 7.45 | 16 Q | Zhou (CHN); L 7.72–6.59 | Did not advance | | | |
| Rajiah Sallsabillah | Women's single | 7.56 | 17 | Did not advance | | | | |

== Wushu ==
Four Indonesian wushu athletes qualified for the Games.

Sanda

| Athlete | Event | Quarterfinal | Semifinal | Final | |
| Athlete | Event | Opponent Result | Opponent Result | Opponent Result | Rank |
|---|---|---|---|---|---|
| Bintang Reindra Nada Guitara | Men's 56 kg | | | | |

Taolu

| Athlete | Event | First routine | Second routine | Third routine | Total | Rank |
|---|---|---|---|---|---|---|
| Seraf Naro Siregar | Men's changquan / daoshu / gunshu | Changquan; 9.76 | Daoshu; 9.763 | Gunshu; 9.76 | 29.283 | 2nd place, silver medalist(s) |
| Patricia Geraldine | Women's changquan / jianshu / qiangshu | Changquan; 9.726 | Jianshu; 9.533 | Qiangshu; 9.736 | 28.995 | 4 |
| Tasya Ayu Puspa Dewi | Women's nanquan / nandao | Nanquan; 9.723 | Nandao; 9.653 | —N/a | 19.376 | 4 |
