= Wujiang =

Wujiang or Wu Jiang may refer to:

== Places in China ==
- Wujiang District, Shaoguan (武江区), a district of Shaoguan, Guangdong
- Wujiang District, Suzhou (吴江区), a district in Suzhou, Jiangsu
- Wujiang railway station (zh; 乌江站), a freight-only station on the Sichuan–Guizhou railway in Wujiang, Guizhou
- Wujiang, Anhui (zh; 乌江镇), a town in He County, Anhui
- Wujiang, Gansu (zh; 乌江镇), a town in and subdivision of Ganzhou District, Zunyi, Guizhou
- Wujiang, Guangxi (zh; 五将镇), a town in Zhaoping County, Guangxi
- Wujiang, Guizhou (zh; 乌江镇), a town in and subdivision of Bozhou District, Zunyi, Guizhou
- Wujiang, Nanjing (zh; 乌江镇), a town in Pukou District, Nanjing, Jiangsu
- Wujiang, Jiangxi (zh; 乌江镇), a town in Jishui County, Jiangxi

== Rivers ==
- Wu River (disambiguation), various rivers known as the Wujiang in Chinese

== See also ==
- Jiang Wu (姜武, born 1967), Chinese actor
