= Sport climbing at the 2022 Asian Games – Women's speed relay =

Women's speed relay at the 2022 Asian Games
- Venue: Keqiao Yangshan Sport Climbing Centre
- Date: 4 October 2023
- Competitors: 23 from 6 nations

Medalists
gold medal	China; Deng Lijuan, Niu Di, Wang Shengyan, Zhang Shaoqin
silver medal	Indonesia; Desak Made Rita Kusuma Dewi, Nurul Iqamah, Alivany Ver Khadijah, Rajiah Sallsabillah
bronze medal	South Korea; Choi Na-woo, Jeong Ji-min, Noh Hee-ju

The women's competition speed climbing relay event at the 2022 Asian Games took place on 4 October 2023 at Keqiao Yangshan Sport Climbing Centre, Shaoxing, China.

== Schedule ==
All times are China Standard Time (UTC+08:00)

Date	Time	Event
Wednesday, 4 October 2023	11:35	Qualification
Wednesday, 4 October 2023	20:24	Semifinals
Wednesday, 4 October 2023	20:40	Finals

== Results ==
=== Qualification ===
Rank	Team	Time
1	China (CHN); Deng Lijuan; Niu Di; Wang Shengyan; Zhang Shaoqin	21.877
2	South Korea (KOR); Choi Na-woo; Jeong Ji-min; Noh Hee-ju	25.151
3	Indonesia (INA); Desak Made Rita Kusuma Dewi; Nurul Iqamah; Alivany Ver Khadijah; Rajiah Sallsabillah	25.834
4	Kazakhstan (KAZ); Assel Marlenova; Tanzila Ospan; Tamara Ulzhabayeva; Adeliya Utesheva	29.325
5	Thailand (THA); Nalat Disyabut; Napat Disyabut; Jiraporn Kaitwatcharachai; Pratthana Raksachat	29.970
6	India (IND); Shivani Charak; Shivpreet Pannu; Saniya Farooque Shaikh; Anisha Verma	39.598

=== Knockout round ===
Semifinals
1	China	23.318
4	Kazakhstan	32.417
2	South Korea	26.954
3	Indonesia	21.869

Final
1	China	20.925
3	Indonesia	23.506
Small final
4	Kazakhstan	27.998
2	South Korea	26.901
