= Sport climbing at the 2022 Asian Games – Women's speed =

Women's speed at the 2022 Asian Games
- Venue: Keqiao Yangshan Sport Climbing Centre
- Date: 3 October 2023
- Competitors: 18 from 11 nations

Medalists
gold medal	Desak Made Rita Kusuma Dewi	Indonesia
silver medal	Deng Lijuan	China
bronze medal	Rajiah Sallsabillah	Indonesia

The women's competition speed climbing event at the 2022 Asian Games took place on 3 October 2023 at Keqiao Yangshan Sport Climbing Centre, Shaoxing, China.

== Schedule ==
All times are China Standard Time (UTC+08:00)

Date	Time	Event
Tuesday, 3 October 2023	11:30	Qualification
Tuesday, 3 October 2023	20:00	1/8 finals
Tuesday, 3 October 2023	20:27	Quarterfinals
Tuesday, 3 October 2023	20:45	Semifinals
Tuesday, 3 October 2023	20:53	Finals

== Results ==
=== Qualification ===
Rank	Athlete	Lane A	Lane B	Best
1	Desak Made Rita Kusuma Dewi (INA)	6.600	6.667	6.600
2	Deng Lijuan (CHN)	6.730	7.315	6.730
3	Rajiah Sallsabillah (INA)	6.902	6.870	6.870
4	Niu Di (CHN)	6.954	6.970	6.954
5	Tamara Ulzhabayeva (KAZ)	7.497	8.590	7.497
6	Mahya Darabian (IRI)	8.818	7.721	7.721
7	Karin Hayashi (JPN)	7.783	7.764	7.764
8	Noh Hee-ju (KOR)	8.158	8.154	8.154
9	Assel Marlenova (KAZ)	8.902	8.536	8.536
10	Pratthana Raksachat (THA)	8.643	9.020	8.643
11	Jeong Ji-min (KOR)	9.069	8.712	8.712
12	Narada Disyabut (THA)	8.718	12.240	8.718
13	Anisha Verma (IND)	13.317	9.495	9.495
14	Shivpreet Pannu (IND)	Fall	9.956	9.956
15	Asal Islamova (UZB)	12.077	12.134	12.077
16	Nyamdoogiin Selenge (MGL)	14.529	13.934	13.934
17	Amani Jannat (PAK)	16.811	14.190	14.190
18	Iqra Jilani (PAK)	28.213	24.031	24.031

=== Knockout round ===
1/8 finals
1	Desak Made Rita Kusuma Dewi (INA)	6.789
16	Nyamdoogiin Selenge (MGL)	13.957
8	Noh Hee-ju (KOR)	8.017
9	Assel Marlenova (KAZ)	8.508
4	Niu Di (CHN)	7.403
13	Anisha Verma (IND)	13.417
5	Tamara Ulzhabayeva (KAZ)	8.825
12	Narada Disyabut (THA)	8.314
2	Deng Lijuan (CHN)	6.947
15	Asal Islamova (UZB)	12.627
7	Karin Hayashi (JPN)	7.654
10	Pratthana Raksachat (THA)	9.267
3	Rajiah Sallsabillah (INA)	7.701
14	Shivpreet Pannu (IND)	9.997
6	Mahya Darabian (IRI)	7.943
11	Jeong Ji-min (KOR)	7.062

Quarterfinals
1	Desak Made Rita Kusuma Dewi (INA)	6.703
8	Noh Hee-ju (KOR)	8.071
4	Niu Di (CHN)	7.696
12	Narada Disyabut (THA)	10.725
2	Deng Lijuan (CHN)	6.737
7	Karin Hayashi (JPN)	7.779
3	Rajiah Sallsabillah (INA)	6.733
11	Jeong Ji-min (KOR)	9.801

Semifinals
1	Desak Made Rita Kusuma Dewi (INA)	6.522
4	Niu Di (CHN)	6.837
2	Deng Lijuan (CHN)	6.523
3	Rajiah Sallsabillah (INA)	6.661

Final
1	Desak Made Rita Kusuma Dewi (INA)	6.364
2	Deng Lijuan (CHN)	6.435
Small final
4	Niu Di (CHN)	Fall
3	Rajiah Sallsabillah (INA)	6.879
