= Wang Yuxuan =

Chinese professional footballer

Personal information
- Full name: Wang Yuxuan
- Date of birth: 7 March 2007 (age 19)
- Place of birth: Jinan, Shandong, China
- Height: 1.75 m (5 ft 9 in)
- Positions: Midfielder; forward

Team information
- Current team: Shandong Taishan
- Number: 43

Youth career
- Luneng Football School

Senior career*
Years	Team	Apps	(Gls)
2024–	Shandong Taishan	0	(0)
2026	Shandong Taishan B	25	(4)

International career^{‡}
2026–	China U19		
- * Club domestic league appearances and goals as of 9 November 2026 ‡ National team caps and goals as of 9 November 2026

Wang Yuxuan (simplified Chinese: 王宇轩; traditional Chinese: 王宇軒; pinyin: Wáng Yǔxuān; born 7 March 2007) is a Chinese professional footballer who plays as a midfielder or forward for China League Two club Shandong Taishan B.

== Early life and youth career ==
Wang Yuxuan was born on 7 March 2007 in Jinan, Shandong. He is a product of the Luneng Football School youth system and was part of Shandong Taishan's U17 squad.

== Club career ==
On 15 July 2024, Shandong Taishan officially announced that Wang Yuxuan, along with three other U17 players like Yue Ruijie, Yang Yang and Hao Fubo—had been promoted to the first team for the second registration window of the 2024 Chinese Super League season. The club described the four players as "outstanding young players cultivated by the club's youth academy." Wang's registered position at the time of promotion was listed as forward by some outlets, while the club's official profile lists him as a midfielder.

His transfer history shows a subsequent move to Shandong Taishan U19 on 1 January 2025, followed by a move to Shandong Taishan B on 24 June 2025, before returning to the Shandong Taishan first team on 1 February 2026.

On 7 February 2026, Wang scored twice both directly from free kicks—in a 3–2 friendly win for Shandong Taishan B over Tai'an Tiankuang during winter training in Sanshui, Foshan.

In the 2026 season with Shandong Taishan B in the China League Two, Wang scored in matches against Shanghai Port B on 8 August 2026 and Jiangxi Lushan on 18 September 2026.

== International career ==
In August 2025, Wang was called up to the China U18 squad for the first selection training camp ahead of the 2026 AFC U-20 Asian Cup qualifiers, under coach Dejan Đurđević.

In September 2026, he was named in the China U19 training camp squad for the fourth training period of the year, as part of preparations for the 2027 AFC U-20 Asian Cup. In October 2026, he started for the U19 side in a friendly against Indonesia.

== Career statistics ==
=== Club ===
As of 9 November 2026

Appearances and goals by club, season and competition
Club	Season	League			National Cup		Continental		Other		Total	
Club	Season	Division	Apps	Goals	Apps	Goals	Apps	Goals	Apps	Goals	Apps	Goals
Shandong Taishan B	2026	China League Two	25	4	—	—	—		—		25	4
Career total			25	4	0	0	0	0	0	0	25	4

== Honours ==
Shandong U18

- National Games of China Men's U18 silver medal: 2025
