= Squash at the 2025 World Games – Women's singles =

Squash women's singles at the 2025 World Games
- Venue: Chengdu Hi-Tech Zone Sports Centre; Chengdu, China
- Dates: 8–12 August 2025
- Competitors: 32 from 18 nations

Medalists
gold medal	(Japan) Satomi Watanabe
silver medal	(France) Marie Stephan
bronze medal	(Spain) Marta Domínguez

The women's singles squash competition at the 2025 World Games will take place from 8 to 12 August 2025 at the Chengdu Hi-Tech Zone Sports Centre in Chengdu, China.

== Competition format ==
A total of 32 athletes entered the competition. Players competed in classic cup system.

== Seeds ==
1. (Japan) Satomi Watanabe (Champion)
2. (Hong Kong) Ho Tze Lok (fourth place)
3. (Hong Kong) Lee Ka Yi (quarter-finals)
4. (France) Marie Stephan (runner-up)
5. (Spain) Marta Domínguez (third place)
6. (Switzerland) Cindy Merlo (quarter-finals)
7. (Egypt) Habiba Hani (quarter-finals)
8. (Ukraine) Alina Bushma (round of 32)

== Results ==
Round of 32
1	(Japan) Satomi Watanabe	3
(China) Yin Ziyuan	0
(Hungary) Hannah Chukwu	3
(Austria) Jacqueline Peychär	0
(Switzerland) Ambre Allinckx	3
(Czech Republic) Karolína Šrámková	0
(China) Xu Yunxin	0
7	(Egypt) Habiba Hani	3
5	(Spain) Marta Domínguez	3
(China) Cheng Linglu	0
(Poland) Tola Otrzasek	0
(Germany) Katerina Tycova	3
(Colombia) Lucía Bautista	1
(France) Kara Lincou	3
(Romania) Andreea Ghiorghisor	0
3	(Hong Kong) Lee Ka Yi	3
4	(France) Marie Stephan	3
(China) Zhang Yuning	0
(Czech Republic) Michaela Čepová	0
(Poland) Karina Tyma	3
(Germany) Saskia Beinhard	3
(China) Zhang Yaqi	0
(Croatia) Franka Vidović	3
8	(Ukraine) Alina Bushma	2
6	(Switzerland) Cindy Merlo	3
(France) Léa Barbeau	0
(Japan) Risa Sugimoto	0
(Spain) Cristina Gómez	3
(South Africa) Hayley Ward	3
(Australia) Emily Lamb	1
(China) Liu Ziyi	0
2	(Hong Kong) Ho Tze Lok	3

Round of 16
1	(Japan) Satomi Watanabe	3
(Hungary) Hannah Chukwu	1
(Switzerland) Ambre Allinckx	1
7	(Egypt) Habiba Hani	3
5	(Spain) Marta Domínguez	3
(Germany) Katerina Tycova	0
(France) Kara Lincou	0
3	(Hong Kong) Lee Ka Yi	3
4	(France) Marie Stephan	3
(Poland) Karina Tyma	0
(Germany) Saskia Beinhard	3
(Croatia) Franka Vidović	2
6	(Switzerland) Cindy Merlo	3
(Spain) Cristina Gómez	0
(South Africa) Hayley Ward	1
2	(Hong Kong) Ho Tze Lok	3

Quarter finals
1	(Japan) Satomi Watanabe	3
7	(Egypt) Habiba Hani	0
5	(Spain) Marta Domínguez	3
3	(Hong Kong) Lee Ka Yi	2
4	(France) Marie Stephan	3
(Germany) Saskia Beinhard	0
6	(Switzerland) Cindy Merlo	0
2	(Hong Kong) Ho Tze Lok	3

Semi-finals
1	(Japan) Satomi Watanabe	3
5	(Spain) Marta Domínguez	0
4	(France) Marie Stephan	3
2	(Hong Kong) Ho Tze Lok	2

Finals
1	(Japan) Satomi Watanabe	3
4	(France) Marie Stephan	0

3rd place
5	(Spain) Marta Domínguez	3
2	(Hong Kong) Ho Tze Lok	0
