= Zhou Yafei (climber) =

Chinese speed climber

Personal information
- Native name: 周娅菲
- Nickname: 滑板 (skateboard)
- Born: 15 May 2004 (age 22) Lishui, China
- Years active: 2022–present
- Height: 156 cm (5 ft 1 in)

Climbing career
- Type of climber: Competition speed climbing

Sport
- Country: China
- Club: Zhejiang Provincial Rock Climbing Team
- Coached by: Zhong Qixin
Medal record
Women's competition climbing
Representing China
World Games
Gold medal – first place	2025 Chengdu	Speed relay
Bronze medal – third place	2025 Chengdu	Speed
World Championships
Bronze medal – third place	2025 Seoul	Speed
World Cup (Overall)
Second place	2025	Speed
Asian Championships
Silver medal – second place	2026 Meishan	Speed
Bronze medal – third place	2024 Tai'an	Speed
Asian Beach Games
Gold medal – first place	2026 Sanya	Speed
Bronze medal – third place	2026 Sanya	Speed relay

Zhou Yafei (Chinese: 周娅菲; born 15 May 2004) is a Chinese competition speed climber. She represented China at the 2024 Summer Olympics.

== Career ==
Zhou competed at the 2023 IFSC Climbing World Championships and finished in eighth place.

During the first leg of 2024 Olympic Qualifier Series in Shanghai, Zhou finished in first place with a personal best time of 6.54 seconds. During the second leg of the Olympic Qualifier Series in Budapest, she finished in second place, just 0.02 seconds behind Aleksandra Kałucka. As a result, she qualified to represent China at the 2024 Summer Olympics. During the first race in the qualification round of the women's speed event, Zhou reached the timer first, however, she failed to press it hard enough to stop the clock on the sensor pad. The next race had a similar issue with the clock on the same pad. The sensor was declared defective, which required a half-hour stop in the competition for repairs. She finished the qualification round in fourth place with a personal best time of 6.389 seconds. In the elimination heats, she won her heat against Italy's Beatrice Colli with a time of 6.55. She finished in seventh place after losing in the quarterfinals to eventual bronze medalist Aleksandra Kałucka of Poland.

On 10 April 2026, she competed at the 2026 World Climbing Asia Championship and won a silver medal with a time of 6.47 seconds. Weeks later, she then competed at the 2026 Asian Beach Games and won a gold medal in the speed event with a time of 6.35 seconds. She also won a bronze medal in the speed relay, along with Deng Lijuan. She was subsequently named China's flag bearer for the closing ceremony. In July 2026, she competed at the 2026 World Climbing Series in Kraków, Poland and won a gold medal in the speed relay, along with Deng. After lowering the world record to 13.02 seconds in the semifinals, they improved it once more in the gold medal race, with a world record time 12.89 seconds to secure the inaugural title. They became the first women's team to complete the relay in under 13 seconds.

== Major results ==
=== IFSC Climbing World Cup ===
Women's speed

Year	Venue	Opponent	Time (s)	Result	Ref
2024	Seoul, South Korea	(Indonesia) Rajiah Sallsabillah	6.78–8.08	(gold) Gold	
2025	Bali, Indonesia	(Poland) Aleksandra Miroslaw	8.12-6.37	(silver) Silver	

=== Olympic Games ===
Discipline	2024
Speed	7

=== World championships ===
Discipline	2023	2025
Speed	8	3

=== World Cup ===
Discipline	2023	2024	2025
Speed	16	50	2

=== Asian championships ===
Discipline	2022
Speed	10
