= Deng Lijuan =

Chinese speed climber (born 2000)

Personal information
- Nicknames: Xiao Deng Zi, Little Dengzi, Deng Deng
- Born: Deng Meigu; 12 May 2000 (age 26) Leiyang, China
- Home town: Changsha, China
- Years active: 2018–present

Climbing career
- Type of climber: Competition speed climbing

Sport
- Coached by: Zhang Ning
Medal record
Representing China
competition climbing
Olympic Games
Silver medal – second place	2024 Paris	Speed
World Games
Gold medal – first place	2025 Chengdu	Speed
Gold medal – first place	2025 Chengdu	Speed relay
World Championships
Silver medal – second place	2025 Seoul	Speed
World Cup (Overall)
Winner	2024	Speed
Asian Games
Gold medal – first place	2022 Hangzhou	Speed relay
Silver medal – second place	2022 Hangzhou	Speed
Silver medal – second place	2026 Aichi–Nagoya	Speed
Asian Beach Games
Silver medal – second place	2026 Sanya	Speed
Bronze medal – third place	2026 Sanya	Speed relay

Deng Lijuan (Chinese: 邓丽娟; born 12 May 2000) is a Chinese competition speed climber. Deng represented China at the 2024 Summer Olympics, where she won the silver medal in the speed climbing event.

== Career ==
Deng competed in speed climbing at the 2024 Summer Olympics. She knocked out Indonesia's Desak Made Rita Kusuma Dewi and Rajiah Sallsabillah in her quarterfinal and semifinal heats. In the final she faced Poland's Aleksandra Mirosław. Despite setting a personal best time of 6.18 she lost by 0.08 seconds and finished in the second position winning a silver medal.

== Major results ==
=== Olympic Games ===
Discipline	2024
Speed	2

=== World championships ===
Discipline	2023	2025
Speed	10	2

=== World Cup ===
Discipline	2018	2019	2021	2022	2023	2024
Speed	40	26	—	4	3	1

=== Asian championships ===
Discipline	2018
Speed	11
