= Rishat Khaibullin =

Kazakhstani speed climber

Personal information
- Native name: Ришат Хайбуллин
- Nationality: Kazakhstani
- Born: 21 September 1995 (age 31) Almaty, Kazakhstan
- Occupation: Professional climber
- Height: 1.69 m (5 ft 7 in)
- Weight: 56 kg (123 lb)

Climbing career
- Type of climber: Competition speed climbing
Medal record
Men's competition climbing
Representing Kazakhstan
World Games
Bronze medal – third place	2025 Chengdu	Speed
World Championships
Bronze medal – third place	2019 Hachiōji	Combined
World Cup
Silver medal – second place	2025 Chamonix	Speed
Asian Beach Games
Bronze medal – third place	2026 Sanya	Speed
Bronze medal – third place	2026 Sanya	Speed relay

Rishat Rinatovich Khaibullin (Russian: Ришат Ринатович Хайбуллин; born 21 September 1995) is a Kazakh competition climber, who specializes in competition speed climbing. He won the bronze medal in the combined event at the 2019 IFSC Climbing World Championships, which qualified him for the 2020 Summer Olympics. He is also a Master of Sports on International Class. He lives and trains in Brno, Czech Republic. Khaibullin is of Tatar descent.

== International Competitions ==
Year	Event	City	Country	Rank
2018	Asian Games	Palembang	Indonesia	4
2019	Asian Championships	Bogor	Indonesia	3rd place, bronze medalist(s)
2019	World Championships	Hachioji	Japan	3rd place, bronze medalist(s)
2021	Olympic Games	Tokyo	Japan	11
2025	World Games	Chengdu	China	3rd place, bronze medalist(s)
