= South Africa at the 2025 World Games =

- IOC code: RSA
- NOC: South African Sports Confederation and Olympic Committee

in Chengdu, China 7 August 2025 – 17 August 2025
- Competitors: 26 (13 men and 13 women) in 9 sports and 27 events
- Medals Ranked 57th: Gold 0 Silver 3 Bronze 0 Total 3

World Games appearances
- 1981; 1985; 1989; 1993; 1997; 2001; 2005; 2009; 2013; 2017; 2022; 2025

South Africa competed at the 2025 World Games held in Chengdu, China from 7 to 17 August 2025.

Athletes representing South Africa won three silver medals and the country finished in 57th place in the medal table

== Medalists ==
Medal	Name	Sport	Event	Date
Silver	Hamish Lovemore	Canoe marathon	Men's K1 short distance	9 August
Silver	Hamish Lovemore	Canoe marathon	Men's K1 long distance	10 August
Silver	Jason Theron	Billiard sports	Mixed heyball pool	14 August

== Competitors ==
The following is the list of number of competitors in the Games.

Sport	Men	Women	Total
Archery	2	1	3
Billards	1	1	2
Canoe marathon	2	2	4
Kickboxing	3	3	6
Muaythai	1	0	1
Orienteering	0	2	2
Powerlifting	1	1	2
Sport climbing	2	2	2
Squash	1	1	2
Total	13	13	26

== Powerlifting ==
Classic

Athlete	Event	Exercises			Total weight	Total points	Rank
Athlete	Event	Squat	Bench press	Deadlift	Total weight	Total points	Rank
Megan Faul	Women's Super heavyweight	205.0	122.5	217.5	545.0	100.98	7

Equipped

Athlete	Event	Exercises			Total weight	Total points	Rank
Athlete	Event	Squat	Bench press	Deadlift	Total weight	Total points	Rank
Haroun Pietersen	Men's heavyweight	325.0	205.0	285.0	815.0	83.46	8

== Squash ==
Athlete	Event	Round of 32	Round of 16	Quarterfinals	Semi-finals	Final / BM	
Athlete	Event	Opposition Score	Opposition Score	Opposition Score	Opposition Score	Opposition Score	Rank
	Men's singles						
	Women's singles						
