= Rajiah Sallsabillah =

Indonesian climber

Personal information
- Nickname: Billah
- Nationality: Indonesia
- Born: 30 April 1999 (age 27) Tangerang, Banten, Indonesia
- Education: Master's degree in Information Technology; Budi Luhur University
- Years active: 2017–present
- Height: 158 cm (5 ft 2 in)

Sport
- Country: Indonesia
- Sport: competition climbing
- Event: Speed
- Club: Banten / Kota Tangerang
- Coached by: Hendra Basir
Medal record
Women's competition climbing
Representing Indonesia
World Games
Bronze medal – third place	2025 Chengdu	Speed single 4
Asian Games
Gold medal – first place	2018 Jakarta–Palembang	Speed relay
Silver medal – second place	2022 Hangzhou	Speed relay
Bronze medal – third place	2022 Hangzhou	Speed
Asian Championships
Gold medal – first place	2019 Bogor	Speed relay
Silver medal – second place	2017 Tehran	Speed relay
Bronze medal – third place	2019 Bogor	Speed
Bronze medal – third place	2022 Seoul	Speed

Rajiah Sallsabillah (born 30 April 1999) is an Indonesian competition climber specializing in competition speed climbing.

== Career ==
In 2023, she won her first ever gold medal at the IFSC Climbing World Cup in Chamonix, France.

Sallsabillah competed in speed climbing at the 2024 Summer Olympics. She won her run against Emma Hunt of France in the quarterfinals equalizing her personal best of 6.54. Then she lost her semifinal against China's Deng Lijuan despite setting a new personal best time of 6.41. In the bronze medal contest Sallsabillah lost to Poland's Aleksandra Kałucka and finished the competition in fourth place.

== Achievements ==
=== IFSC Climbing World Cup ===
Women's speed

Year	Venue	Opponent	Time (s)	Result	Ref
2023	Chamonix, France	(France) Victoire Andrier	6.97–9.59	(gold) Gold	
2024	Seoul, South Korea	(China) Zhou Yafei	8.08–6.78	(silver) Silver	

Women's speed relay

Year	Venue	Partner	Opponent	Time (s)	Result	Ref
2026	Kraków, Poland	(Indonesia) Desak Made Rita Kusuma Dewi	(Spain) Leslie Adriana Romero Pérez (Spain) Carla Martínez Vidal	13.14–13.52	(bronze) Bronze	

Mixed speed relay

Year	Venue	Partner	Opponent	Time (s)	Result	Ref
2026	Guiyang, China	(Indonesia) Raharjati Nursamsa	(China) Zhang Mengli (China) Zhou Ziyu	11.35–14.85	(gold) Gold	

=== Asian Games ===
Women's speed

Year	Venue	Opponent	Time (s)	Result	Ref
2022	Keqiao Yangshan Sport Climbing Centre, Shaoxing, China	(China) Di Niu	6.879–fall	(bronze) Bronze	

Women's speed relay

Year	Venue	Partner	Opponent	Time (s)	Result	Ref
2018	Jakabaring Sport City, Palembang, Indonesia	(Indonesia) Fitriyani (Indonesia) Puji Lestari (Indonesia) Aries Susanti Rahayu	(China) Deng Lijuan (China) Di Niu (China) Pan Xuhua	25.452–fall	(gold) Gold	
2022	Keqiao Yangshan Sport Climbing Centre, Shaoxing, China	(Indonesia) Desak Made Rita Kusuma Dewi (Indonesia) Alivany Ver Khadijah (Indonesia) Nurul Iqamah	(China) Deng Lijuan (China) Niu Di (China) Zhang Shaoqin (China) Wang Shengqin	23.506–20.925	(silver) Silver	

=== Asian Championships ===
Women's speed

Year	Venue	Opponent	Time (s)	Result	Ref
2019	Pakansari Stadium, Bogor, Indonesia	(Indonesia) Amanda Narda Mutia	7.574–7.633	(bronze) Bronze	
2022	Seoul, South Korea	(China) Ni Mingwei	7.11–9.01	(bronze) Bronze	

Women's speed relay

Year	Venue	Partner	Opponent	Time (s)	Result	Ref
2017	Mega Pars Complex, Tehran, Iran	(Indonesia) Fitriyani (Indonesia) Dhorifatus Syafi'iyah	(Indonesia) Aries Susanti Rahayu (Indonesia) Puji Lestari (Indonesia) Santi Wellyanti	fall–27.97	(silver) Silver	
2019	Pakansari Stadium, Bogor, Indonesia	(Indonesia) Nurul Iqamah (Indonesia) Amanda Narda Mutia	(Indonesia) Mudji Mulyani (Indonesia) Dhorifatus Syafi'iyah (Indonesia) Devi Berthdigna	24.942–28.015	(gold) Gold	

=== NEOM Beach Games ===
Women's speed

Year	Venue	Opponent	Time (s)	Result	Ref
2023	Gayal Beach, Neom, Saudi Arabia	(Indonesia) Desak Made Rita Kusuma Dewi	6.726–6.88	(gold) Gold	
