= 2019 Combined Japan Cup =

- Location: Saijō city, Ehime Prefecture
- Dates: 25 – 26 May 2019

Champions
- Men: Tomoa Narasaki
- Women: Miho Nonaka

The 2019 Combined Japan Cup was the second of the competition. It was organized by the JMSCA (Japan Mountaineering and Sport Climbing Association). It was held from 25 to 26 May 2019 in Saijō city, Ehime Prefecture. The athletes competed in combined format of three disciplines: speed, bouldering, and lead. The winner for men was Tomoa Narasaki and for women was Miho Nonaka.

== Schedule ==
Men		Women	
25 May (Qualifications)
09:00 ～ 09:25	Speed	12:15 ～ 12:40	Speed
09:50 ～ 12:05	Bouldering	13:05 ～ 15:20	Bouldering
13:00 ～ 14:40	Lead	16:15 ～ 17:55	Lead
26 May (Finals)
09:05 ～ 09:25	Speed	13:05 ～ 13:35	Speed
09:55 ～ 11:19	Bouldering	13:55 ～ 15:19	Bouldering
11:45 ～ 12:25	Lead	15:45 ～ 16:25	Lead

== Competition format ==
It was held to simulate the latest Olympic combined format. It was also held to decide the athletes to compete in the 2019 IFSC Climbing World Championships in August.

Disciplines	Qualifications	Finals (8)	Notes
Speed	Athletes climbed twice in two different lanes on a standardized 15-meter wall. Best times counted.	Athletes were seeded based on the speed qualification results. Athletes climbed head-to-head with each other in a bracket format.	All competitors ran in the same number of races.
Boulder	Four boulder problems. Time limit for each boulder was five minutes.	Three boulder problems. Time limit for each boulder was four minutes.	Score was determined by number of tops, number of zones, attempts to tops, and attempts to zones in decreasing order of importance.
Lead	A single lead route.	A single lead route. Time limit to climb the route was six minutes.	Score was determined by the highest point reached and the amount of time spent climbing the route.

Athletes were ranked based on their scores in separate disciplines. Points were calculated by multiplying the ranks of each athlete in the three disciplines.

== Men ==
Tomoa Narasaki set a new Japan national record for speed climbing of 6.291s in the finals.

FINALS						QUALIFICATIONS						
Rank	Name	Final Points	Lead	Boulder	Speed	Rank	Name	Points	Lead	Boulder	Speed	Seed
1	Tomoa Narasaki	6.00	2. 35+	3. 2T3z 4 5	1. 6.291	3	Tomoa Narasaki	16.00	2. 37+	4. 1T4z 3 7	2. 6.654	2
2	Kai Harada	12.00	1. Top	2. 2T3z 2 4	6. fall	1	Kai Harada	6.00	1. Top	1. 2T4z 5 9	6. 7.062	11
3	Kokoro Fujii	36.00	3. 35+	6. 1T2z 4 9	2. 6.475	2	Kokoro Fujii	6.00	3. 37+	2. 2T3z 8 9	1. 6.528	1
4	Keita Dohi	40.00	5. 34	1. 3T3z 5 5	8. 7.273	5	Keita Dohi	294.00	6. 37+	7. 1T4z 4 11	7. 7.168	4
5	Yoshiyuki Ogata	72.00	6. 34	4. 2T3z 4 5	3. 6.680	6	Yoshiyuki Ogata	390.00	13. 32	10. 1T2z 1 2	3. 6.703	8
6	Meichi Narasaki	80.00	4. 34+	5. 1T2z 2 5	4. 8.263	4	Meichi Narasaki	60.00	4. 37+	3. 1T4z 1 13	5. 6.945	6
7	Ryoei Nukui	280.00	7. 31+	8. 0T1z 0 5	5. 6.798	7	Ryoei Nukui	704.00	16. 30	11. 1T2z 3 4	4. 6.811	12
8	Taisei Ishimatsu	392.00	8. 25+	7. 1T2z 7 9	7. 7.062	8	Taisei Ishimatsu	840.00	14. 31+	6. 1T4z 4 8	10. 7.486	5
						9	Yuta Imaizumi	972.00	9. 34+	12. 1T2z 6 7	9. 7.459	14
						10	Masahiro Higuchi	1045.00	5. 37+	19. 0T1z 0 4	11. 7.525	18
						11	Shuta Tanaka	1088.00	8. 37+	8. 1T4z 7 18	17. 8.364	17
						12	Rei Sugimoto	1440.00	12. 32	15. 0T2z 0 8	8. 7.327	3
						13	Rei Kawamata	1615.00	17. 29	5. 1T4z 3 10	19. 8.577	16
						14	Taito Nakagami	2520.00	7. 37+	20. 0T1z 0 6	18. 8.459	19
						15	Hiroto Shimizu	2700.00	10. 34	18. 0T1z 0 2	15. 8.096	7
						16	Tomoaki Takata	2730.00	15. 31+	14. 0T2z 0 7	13. 7.943	9
						17	Yuji Inoue	2808.00	18. 26+	13. 0T2z 0 3	12. 7.560	13
						18	Ao Yurikusa	2992.00	11. 33+	17. 0T2z 0 14	16. 8.354	20
						19	Keita Watabe	3420.00	19. 24+	9. 1T3z 3 4	20. 8.612	10
						20	Yuya Kitae	4480.00	20. 23	16. 0T2z 0 10	14. 7.957	15

== Women ==
Miho Nonaka set a new Japan national record for speed climbing of 8.499s in the qualifications.

FINALS						QUALIFICATIONS						
Rank	Name	Final Points	Lead	Boulder	Speed	Rank	Name	Points	Lead	Boulder	Speed	Seed
1	Miho Nonaka	7.00	7. 35+	1. 2T3z 2 3	1. 8.790	1	Miho Nonaka	20.00	5. 36	4. 1T4z 5 15	1. 8.499	2
2	Akiyo Noguchi	12.00	2. 46+	2. 2T3z 6 8	3. 10.097	4	Akiyo Noguchi	32.00	4. 36+	2. 2T3z 3 4	4. 9.452	3
3	Ai Mori	12.00	1. Top	3. 1T3z 1 11	4. 12.018	3	Ai Mori	27.00	1. Top	3. 2T2z 9 4	9. 12.167	5
4	Natsuki Tanii	72.00	3. 46+	4. 0T2z 0 3	6. 12.781	5	Natsuki Tanii	132.00	2. 37+	6. 1T2z 1 2	11. 12.443	10
5	Nanako Kura	128.00	8. 30	8. 0T1z 0 8	2. 10.820	7	Nanako Kura	225.00	15. 27+	5. 1T3z 4 8	3. 9.450	15
6	Futaba Ito	150.00	6. 38	5. 0T2z 0 9	5. 10.075	2	Futaba Ito	24.00	12. 27+	1. 4T4z 15 10	2. 8.992	4
7	Mei Kotake	210.00	5. 39+	6. 0T1z 0 1	7. 11.682	8	Mei Kotake	240.00	6. 32	8. 1T2z 5 6	5. 11.061	8
8	Natsumi Hirano	224.00	4. 39+	7. 0T1z 0 4	8. 11.760	6	Natsumi Hirano	168.00	3. 37	7. 1T2z 2 3	8. 11.832	6
						9	Yuki Hiroshige	672.00	8. 28+	12. 0T2z 0 11	7. 11.567	9
						10	Mao Nakamura	864.00	16. 25+	9. 1T2z 10 3	6. 11.158	7
						11	Hana Kudo	1300.00	13. 27+	10. 1T2z 10 11	10. 12.272	14
						12	Yuka Higuchi	1683.50	7. 29+	18. 0T0z 0 0	13. 12.558	13
						13	Miu Kurita	1728.00	9. 28+	16. 0T1z 0 4	12. 12.545	12
						14	Risa Ota	1936.00	11. 28+	11. 1T1z 8 8	16. 13.514	11
						15	Serika Okawachi	2340.00	10. 28+	13. 0T1z 0 1	18. 14.217	17
						16	Kokoro Takata	3570.00	14. 27+	17. 0T1z 0 7	15. 13.482	16
						17	Momoka Miyajima	3857.00	19. 20+	14. 0T1z 0 2	14. 12.829	18
						18	Sora Ito	4190.50	17. 21+	14. 0T1z 0 2	17. 14.109	20
						19	Shuri Nishida	6327.00	18. 21+	18. 0T0z 0 0	19. 14.744	19
