= Boulder Japan Cup 2021 =

Annual competition climbing event

- Venue: Komazawa Olympic Park
- Location: Tokyo, Japan
- Date: 30 – 31 January 2021
- Website: https://www.jma-climbing.org/competition/2021/bjc/

Medalists
| gold medal | Kokoro Fujii / Ai Mori |
| silver medal | Tomoa Narasaki / Miho Nonaka |
| bronze medal | Yoshiyuki Ogata / Futaba Ito |

The 2021 Boulder Japan Cup (Japanese: ボルダージャパンカップ2021, Hepburn: Borudā Japan Kappu 2021; or BJC 2021) was the 16th edition of the annual competition bouldering event organised by the Japan Mountaineering and Sport Climbing Association (JMSCA), held in Komazawa Olympic Park, Tokyo.

BJC is the sole selection event for Japan's national bouldering team. Athletes who place highly at the BJC are eligible to compete in the Boulder World Cups, subject to JMSCA's prevailing selection criteria. BJC 2021 was the first domestic competition of the 2021 season. 51 men and 40 women competed. Kokoro Fujii and Ai Mori claimed the men's and women's titles respectively, with Ai Mori securing her first BJC title.

== Finals ==
=== Men ===
The men's bouldering finals took place on 31 January 2021.

| Rank | Athlete | Boulder | | | | Total |
| Rank | Athlete | 1 | 2 | 3 | 4 | Total |
|---|---|---|---|---|---|---|
| 1 | Kokoro Fujii | T2 z1 | T2 z2 | T1 z1 | T1 z1 | 4T 4z 6 5 |
| 2 | Tomoa Narasaki | T2 z2 | T2 z1 | T3 z2 | T2 z2 | 4T 4z 9 7 |
| 3 | Yoshiyuki Ogata | T4 z4 | T4 z4 | T1 z1 | T3 z1 | 4T 4z 12 10 |
| 4 | Sohta Amagasa | - | T4 z3 | T3 z2 | - | 2T 2z 7 5 |
| 5 | Taisei Ishimatsu | z1 | - | z2 | - | 0T 2z—3 |
| 6 | Kai Harada | z1 | - | z2 | - | 0T 2z—3 |

=== Women ===
The women's bouldering finals took place on 31 January 2021.

| Rank | Athlete | Boulder | | | | Total |
| Rank | Athlete | 1 | 2 | 3 | 4 | Total |
|---|---|---|---|---|---|---|
| 1 | Ai Mori | T4 z4 | T2 z2 | T6 z6 | T1 z1 | 4T 4z 13 13 |
| 2 | Miho Nonaka | T2 z2 | T1 z1 | z7 | z1 | 2T 4z 3 11 |
| 3 | Futaba Ito | T1 z1 | - | z2 | z5 | 1T 3z 1 8 |
| 4 | Mao Nakamura | T5 z2 | z1 | - | z1 | 1T 3z 5 4 |
| 5 | Natsuki Tanii | - | z3 | - | T2 z1 | 1T 2z 2 4 |
| 6 | Miku Ishii | - | - | - | z1 | 0T 1z—1 |

== Semifinals ==
=== Men ===
The men's bouldering semifinals took place on 31 January 2021.

| Rank | Athlete | Boulder | | | | Total | Notes |
| Rank | Athlete | 1 | 2 | 3 | 4 | Total | Notes |
|---|---|---|---|---|---|---|---|
| 1 | Sohta Amagasa | T3 z2 | T4 z4 | T1 z1 | T3 z2 | 4T 4z 11 9 | Q |
| 2 | Taisei Ishimatsu | T1 z1 | T5 z3 | T2 z1 | T4 z4 | 4T 4z 12 9 | Q |
| 3 | Tomoa Narasaki | z1 | T3 z2 | T1 z1 | T1 z1 | 3T 4z 5 5 | Q |
| 4 | Yoshiyuki Ogata | T1 z1 | z4 | T1 z1 | T3 z3 | 3T 4z 5 9 | Q |
| 5 | Kai Harada | z1 | T4 z1 | T2 z1 | T1 z1 | 3T 4z 7 4 | Q |
| 6 | Kokoro Fujii | z1 | z3 | T1 z1 | T1 z1 | 2T 4z 2 6 | Q |
| 7 | Rei Sugimoto | T2 z1 | z2 | T2 z1 | z3 | 2T 4z 4 7 | |
| 8 | Tomoaki Takata | T3 z1 | z10 | z1 | T7 z5 | 2T 4z 10 17 | |
| 9 | Keita Watabe | - | T2 z2 | z1 | T3 z3 | 2T 3z 5 6 | |
| 10 | Yuta Imaizumi | z1 | - | T4 z4 | T1 z1 | 2T 3z 5 6 | |
| 11 | Ao Yurikusa | z1 | z12 | z1 | T1 z1 | 1T 4z 1 15 | |
| 12 | Meichi Narasaki | z1 | z3 | T3 z2 | z5 | 1T 4z 3 11 | |
| 13 | Rei Kawamata | z2 | z4 | z1 | T6 z2 | 1T 4z 6 9 | |
| 14 | Hiroto Shimizu | z2 | z2 | z3 | T7 z7 | 1T 4z 7 14 | |
| 15 | Toru Kofukuda | - | - | - | T6 z6 | 1T 1z 6 6 | |
| 16 | Taisei Homma | z2 | z2 | z3 | z3 | 0T 4z—10 | |
| 17 | Yuji Fujiwaki | z2 | - | z1 | z1 | 0T 3z—4 | |
| 18 | Keita Dohi | - | z2 | z1 | z9 | 0T 3z—12 | |
| 19 | Yuji Furugen | - | z3 | z1 | - | 0T 2z—4 | |
| 20 | Katsura Konishi | - | - | z3 | - | 0T 1z—3 | |

=== Women ===
The women's bouldering semifinals took place on 31 January 2021.

| Rank | Athlete | Boulder | | | | Total | Notes |
| Rank | Athlete | 1 | 2 | 3 | 4 | Total | Notes |
|---|---|---|---|---|---|---|---|
| 1 | Miho Nonaka | T1 z1 | T1 z7 | T3 z1 | T1 z1 | 4T 4z 12 10 | Q |
| 2 | Futaba Ito | T1 z1 | z3 | T1 z1 | T1 z1 | 3T 4z 3 6 | Q |
| 3 | Mao Nakamura | T1 z1 | z7 | T1 z1 | T2 z2 | 3T 4z 4 11 | Q |
| 4 | Miku Ishii | T2 z2 | z11 | T2 z2 | T2 z1 | 3T 4z 6 16 | Q |
| 5 | Natsuki Tanii | T1 z1 | - | T1 z1 | T1 z1 | 3T 3z 3 3 | Q |
| 6 | Ai Mori | T1 z1 | - | T1 z1 | T1 z1 | 3T 3z 3 3 | Q |
| 7 | Akiyo Noguchi | T2 z2 | - | T2 z1 | T1 z1 | 3T 3z 5 4 | |
| 8 | Ryu Nakagawa | T2 z2 | - | T3 z3 | T1 z1 | 3T 3z 6 6 | |
| 9 | Nanako Kura | T2 z1 | - | T4 z1 | T1 z1 | 3T 3z 7 3 | |
| 10 | Aika Tajima | T1 z1 | - | T3 z1 | T4 z3 | 3T 3z 8 3 | |
| 11 | Anon Matsufuji | T1 z1 | z7 | z1 | T2 z2 | 2T 4z 3 11 | |
| 12 | Momoko Abe | T1 z1 | - | T2 z1 | z2 | 2T 3z 3 4 | |
| 13 | Hana Koike | T1 z1 | - | T3 z1 | z4 | 2T 3z 4 6 | |
| 14 | Yuno Harigae | T1 z1 | - | z2 | T5 z5 | 2T 3z 6 8 | |
| 15 | Nanami Nobe | T1 z1 | - | z3 | T12 z12 | 2T 3z 13 16 | |
| 16 | Nao Mori | T1 z1 | - | - | T1 z1 | 2T 2z 2 2 | |
| 17 | Mashiro Kuzuu | T2 z2 | - | - | T3 z2 | 2T 2z 5 4 | |
| 18 | Sara Watanabe | z3 | - | z2 | T4 z3 | 1T 3z 4 8 | |
| 19 | Saki Kikuchi | T5 z5 | - | z2 | z8 | 1T 3z 5 15 | |
| 20 | Nonoha Kume | - | - | z5 | - | 0T 1z—5 | |

== Qualifications ==
=== Men ===
The men's bouldering qualifications took place on 30 January 2021.

| Rank | Athlete | Boulder | | | | | Total | Notes |
| Rank | Athlete | 1 | 2 | 3 | 4 | 5 | Total | Notes |
|---|---|---|---|---|---|---|---|---|
| 1 | Keita Dohi | T6 z6 | T2 z1 | z1 | z3 | T2 z2 | 3T 5z 10 13 | Q |
| 1 | Yoshiyuki Ogata | T4 z4 | z1 | T4 z2 | T2 z1 | z5 | 3T 5z 10 13 | Q |
| 3 | Sohta Amagasa | T3 z2 | z3 | T5 z3 | z5 | T5 z5 | 3T 5z 13 18 | Q |
| 4 | Rei Sugimoto | T5 z3 | z2 | z3 | z3 | z4 | 3T 5z 14 15 | Q |
| 5 | Meichi Narasaki | T2 z2 | T3 z2 | z2 | z1 | z2 | 2T 5z 5 9 | Q |
| 6 | Kokoro Fujii | T3 z3 | z2 | - | T1 z1 | z2 | 2T 4z 4 8 | Q |
| 7 | Taisei Homma | T4 z4 | - | z1 | T1 z1 | z5 | 2T 4z 5 11 | Q |
| 8 | Tomoaki Takata | - | z2 | T3 z3 | T4 z2 | z1 | 2T 4z 7 8 | Q |
| 9 | Rei Kawamata | T2 z2 | z2 | z5 | - | T5 z1 | 2T 4z 7 10 | Q |
| 10 | Tomoa Narasaki | T2 z2 | z1 | - | - | T2 z1 | 2T 3z 4 4 | Q |
| 11 | Ao Yurikusa | T3 z3 | z2 | T2 z1 | - | - | 2T 3z 5 6 | Q |
| 12 | Toru Kofukuda | T7 z7 | - | z4 | - | T4 z4 | 2T 3z 11 15 | Q |
| 13 | Keita Watabe | z2 | z1 | z2 | z1 | T2 z2 | 1T 5z 2 8 | Q |
| 14 | Yuta Imazizumi | T6 z6 | z2 | z6 | z3 | z1 | 1T 5z 6 18 | Q |
| 15 | Kai Harada | T3 z3 | z2 | z2 | - | z3 | 1T 4z 3 10 | Q |
| 16 | Hiroto Shimizu | T5 z5 | z3 | z6 | - | z2 | 1T 4z 5 16 | Q |
| 17 | Yuji Fujiwaki | T6 z6 | z1 | z1 | - | z2 | 1T 4z 6 10 | Q |
| 18 | Taisei Ishimatsu | T2 z2 | - | z2 | - | z2 | 1T 3z 2 6 | Q |
| 19 | Katsura Konishi | - | z1 | - | z2 | T3 z1 | 1T 3z 3 4 | Q |
| 20 | Yuji Furugen | T4 z4 | z2 | z4 | - | - | 1T 3z 4 10 | Q |
| 21 | Taito Nakagami | T4 z4 | z6 | z1 | - | - | 1T 3z 4 11 | |
| 22 | Kento Yamaguchi | T6 z6 | z3 | z7 | - | - | 1T 3z 6 16 | |
| 23 | Ryosuke Hibino | T10 z10 | z4 | z5 | - | - | 1T 3z 10 19 | |
| 24 | Ryo Omasa | T7 z7 | z1 | - | - | - | 1T 2z 7 8 | |
| 25 | Yuki Hoshi | - | z2 | - | - | T8 z1 | 1T 2z 8 3 | |
| 26 | Ryoei Nukui | - | - | z7 | - | T7 z7 | 1T 2z 14 21 | |
| 27 | Naoki Kawahara | - | - | - | - | T7 z7 | 1T 1z 7 7 | |
| 28 | Jun Yasukawa | T10 z10 | - | - | - | - | 1T 1z 10 10 | |
| 29 | Daiki Sano | z11 | z4 | z5 | z2 | z4 | 0T 5z—26 | |
| 30 | Masahiro Higuchi | - | z1 | - | z4 | z2 | 0T 3z—7 | |
| 31 | Masaki Saito | - | z5 | z1 | - | z2 | 0T 3z—8 | |
| 32 | Hidemasa Nishida | - | z5 | z3 | - | z4 | 0T 3z—12 | |
| 33 | Soma Ito | - | z2 | z4 | - | z7 | 0T 3z—13 | |
| 34 | Kaya Otaka | - | z1 | z4 | - | z10 | 0T 3z—15 | |
| 35 | Hayato Nakamura | z7 | - | z5 | - | z8 | 0T 3z—20 | |
| 36 | Aki Shinozawa | z10 | z4 | - | - | z12 | 0T 3z—26 | |
| 37 | Mizuki Tajima | - | z1 | - | - | z1 | 0T 2z—2 | |
| 38 | Hitoshi Mineoi | - | z2 | - | - | z2 | 0T 2z—4 | |
| 39 | Mahiro Takami | - | z1 | - | - | z4 | 0T 2z—5 | |
| 40 | Junta Sekiguchi | - | z6 | z6 | - | - | 0T 2z—12 | |
| 40 | Isamu Kawabata | - | z6 | z6 | - | - | 0T 2z—12 | |
| 40 | Shuto Matsusawa | z11 | - | z1 | - | - | 0T 2z—12 | |
| 43 | Shuta Tanaka | - | - | z5 | - | z9 | 0T 2z—14 | |
| 44 | Zento Murashita | - | z3 | - | - | z12 | 0T 2z—15 | |
| 45 | Kantaro Ito | - | - | z1 | - | - | 0T 1z—1 | |
| 46 | Reo Yoshii | - | - | z2 | - | - | 0T 1z—2 | |
| 47 | Hajime Takeda | - | - | - | - | z3 | 0T 1z—3 | |
| 48 | Kenshin Hara | - | - | z4 | - | - | 0T 1z—4 | |
| 49 | Masaki Ito | z6 | - | - | - | - | 0T 1z—6 | |
| 50 | Satone Yoshida | - | - | z9 | - | - | 0T 1z—9 | |
| 51 | Yuki Takeuchi | - | - | - | - | - | 0T 0z—— | |

=== Women ===
The women's bouldering qualifications took place on 30 January 2021.

| Rank | Athlete | Boulder | | | | | Total | Notes |
| Rank | Athlete | 1 | 2 | 3 | 4 | 5 | Total | Notes |
|---|---|---|---|---|---|---|---|---|
| 1 | Miho Nonaka | T1 z1 | T3 z3 | T1 z1 | T2 z1 | T1 z1 | 5T 5z 8 7 | Q |
| 2 | Natsuki Tanii | T1 z1 | T4 z4 | T2 z2 | T1 z1 | T2 z1 | 5T 5z 10 9 | Q |
| 3 | Saki Kikuchi | T1 z1 | T7 z7 | z1 | T1 z1 | T1 z1 | 4T 5z 10 11 | Q |
| 4 | Ai Mori | T1 z1 | - | T1 z1 | T1 z1 | T1 z1 | 4T 4z 4 4 | Q |
| 5 | Akiyo Noguchi | T1 z1 | - | T2 z1 | T1 z1 | T2 z1 | 4T 4z 6 4 | Q |
| 6 | Futaba Ito | T1 z1 | - | T1 z1 | T3 z2 | T1 z1 | 4T 4z 6 5 | Q |
| 7 | Anon Matsufuji | T1 z1 | - | T5 z4 | T1 z1 | T1 z1 | 4T 4z 8 7 | Q |
| 8 | Nanako Kura | T1 z1 | - | T5 z4 | T1 z1 | T1 z1 | 4T 4z 10 7 | Q |
| 9 | Mao Nakamura | T1 z1 | - | T11 z11 | T1 z1 | T1 z1 | 4T 4z 14 14 | Q |
| 10 | Hana Koike | T1 z1 | - | T2 z1 | T1 z1 | z1 | 3T 4z 4 4 | Q |
| 11 | Sara Watanabe | T1 z1 | - | z2 | T1 z1 | T2 z2 | 3T 4z 4 6 | Q |
| 12 | Yuno Harigae | T1 z1 | - | z3 | T2 z1 | T1 z1 | 3T 4z 4 6 | Q |
| 13 | Momoko Abe | T1 z1 | - | T2 z1 | T3 z1 | z1 | 3T 4z 6 4 | Q |
| 14 | Nanami Nobe | T1 z1 | - | z7 | T3 z3 | T2 z1 | 3T 4z 6 12 | Q |
| 15 | Ryu Nakagawa | T1 z1 | - | T5 z4 | T1 z1 | z1 | 3T 4z 7 7 | Q |
| 16 | Aika Tajima | T1 z1 | - | T8 z8 | T1 z1 | z1 | 3T 4z 10 11 | Q |
| 17 | Miku Ishii | T1 z1 | - | z1 | T1 z1 | z2 | 2T 4z 2 5 | Q |
| 18 | Nonoha Kume | T1 z1 | - | z2 | T1 z1 | z2 | 2T 4z 2 6 | Q |
| 19 | Mashiro Kuzuu | T1 z1 | - | z2 | z2 | T1 z1 | 2T 4z 2 6 | Q |
| 20 | Nao Mori | T1 z1 | - | z5 | T1 z1 | z1 | 2T 4z 2 8 | Q |
| 21 | Mia Aoyagi | T1 z1 | - | z3 | T2 z2 | z1 | 2T 4z 3 7 | |
| 22 | Aya Sugawara | T1 z1 | - | z3 | T2 z2 | z2 | 2T 4z 3 8 | |
| 23 | Sana Ogura | T1 z1 | - | z8 | T2 z2 | z1 | 2T 4z 3 12 | |
| 24 | Tomona Takao | T2 z2 | - | z2 | T2 z2 | z1 | 2T 4z 4 7 | |
| 25 | Karin Kojima | T2 z1 | - | z7 | T3 z3 | z3 | 2T 4z 5 14 | |
| 26 | Yuki Hiroshige | T1 z1 | - | z3 | T1 z1 | - | 2T 3z 2 5 | |
| 27 | Mishika Ishii | T1 z1 | - | z1 | T2 z2 | - | 2T 3z 3 4 | |
| 28 | Risa Ota | T1 z1 | - | - | T5 z5 | z2 | 2T 3z 6 8 | |
| 29 | Asami Harada | T1 z1 | - | - | T1 z1 | - | 2T 2z 2 2 | |
| 30 | Miu Kurita | T1 z1 | - | - | T2 z2 | - | 2T 2z 3 3 | |
| 31 | Ai Takeuchi | T1 z1 | - | - | z1 | z1 | 1T 3z 1 3 | |
| 31 | Moe Takiguchi | T1 z1 | - | z1 | - | z1 | 1T 3z 1 3 | |
| 33 | Kokoro Takada | T1 z1 | - | - | z1 | z2 | 1T 3z 1 4 | |
| 34 | Serika Okawachi | T1 z1 | - | z3 | - | z1 | 1T 3z 1 5 | |
| 35 | Ryo Nakajima | z1 | - | - | T2 z1 | z1 | 1T 3z 2 3 | |
| 36 | Asuka Fujimoto | T1 z1 | - | - | z1 | - | 1T 2z 1 2 | |
| 37 | Yui Suezawa | z1 | - | - | z1 | z5 | 0T 3z—7 | |
| 38 | Akane Watanabe | z3 | - | - | z1 | z6 | 0T 3z—10 | |
| 39 | Hazumi Inoue | z1 | - | - | - | z1 | 0T 2z—2 | |
| 40 | None Kikuchi | - | - | - | - | - | 0T 0z—— | |
