= Boulder Japan Cup 2019 =

Annual competition climbing event

- Venue: Komazawa Olympic Park
- Location: Tokyo, Japan
- Date: 26 – 27 January 2019
- Website: https://www.jma-climbing.org/competition/2019/bjc/

Medalists
gold medal	Taisei Ishimatsu / Miho Nonaka
silver medal	Tomoa Narasaki / Akiyo Noguchi
bronze medal	Keita Dohi / Futaba Ito

The 2019 Boulder Japan Cup (Japanese: ボルダージャパンカップ2019, Hepburn: Borudā Japan Kappu 2019; or BJC 2019) was the 14th edition of the annual competition bouldering event organised by the Japan Mountaineering and Sport Climbing Association (JMSCA), held in Komazawa Olympic Park, Tokyo.

BJC is the sole selection event for Japan's national bouldering team. Athletes who place highly at the BJC are eligible to compete in the Boulder World Cups, subject to JMSCA's prevailing selection criteria. BJC 2019 was the first domestic competition of the 2019 season. 71 men and 49 women competed. Taisei Ishimatsu and Miho Nonaka claimed the men's and women's titles respectively, with Kai Harada securing his first BJC title.

== Finals ==
=== Men ===
The men's bouldering finals took place on 27 January 2019.

Rank	Athlete	Boulder				Total
Rank	Athlete	1	2	3	4	Total
1	Taisei Ishimatsu	T1 z1	T4 z3	T3 z1	-	3T 3z 8 5
2	Tomoa Narasaki	z2	T1 z1	T2 z1	z3	2T 4z 3 7
3	Keita Dohi	T2 z1	T2 z2	z1	z9	2T 4z 4 13
4	Ryuichi Murai	T1 z1	T2 z1	z1	-	2T 3z 3 3
5	Rei Sugimoto	T4 z1	T4 z4	z6	-	2T 3z 8 11
6	Kokoro Fujii	z1	T1 z1	z1	-	1T 3z 1 3

=== Women ===
The women's bouldering finals took place on 27 January 2019.

Rank	Athlete	Boulder				Total
Rank	Athlete	1	2	3	4	Total
1	Miho Nonaka	T2 z1	T2 z2	z1	T3 z1	3T 4z 7 5
2	Akiyo Noguchi	T2 z1	-	T2 z1	T3 z2	3T 3z 7 4
3	Futaba Ito	T1 z1	T4 z4	z1	z3	2T 4z 5 9
4	Hirano Natsumi	z1	-	z1	z4	0T 3z—6
5	Nanako Kura	z2	-	z4	z2	0T 3z—8
6	Mao Nakamura	z4	-	z4	z7	0T 3z—15

== Semifinals ==
=== Men ===
The men's bouldering semifinals took place on 27 January 2019.

Rank	Athlete	Boulder				Total	Notes
Rank	Athlete	1	2	3	4	Total	Notes
1	Tomoa Narasaki	z2	T1 z1	T7 z6	z5	2T 4z 8 14	Q
2	Taisei Ishimatsu	z6	T1 z1	z5	z3	1T 4z 1 15	Q
2	Kokoro Fujii	z3	T1 z1	z6	z5	1T 4z 1 15	Q
4	Rei Sugimoto	z2	z6	T5 z4	z2	1T 4z 5 14	Q
5	Ryuichi Murai	z2	T3 z1	-	z3	1T 3z 3 6	Q
6	Keita Dohi	z1	-	T5 z3	z1	1T 3z 5 5	Q
7	Rei Kawamata	-	z2	T4 z4	-	1T 2z 4 6	
8	Yoshiyuki Ogata	z2	z5	z7	z3	0T 4z—17	
8	Meichi Narasaki	z8	z1	z3	z5	0T 4z—17	
10	Yuji Fujiwaki	z6	z2	z10	z2	0T 4z—20	
11	Tomoaki Takata	-	z2	z4	z2	0T 3z—8	
11	Keita Watabe	z2	z4	-	z2	0T 3z—8	
13	Soya Shimada	-	z5	z2	z2	0T 3z—9	
14	Yuya Kitae	z6	z1	-	-	0T 3z—9	
15	Yuki Hada	z2	-	z7	-	0T 2z—9	
16	Sohta Amagasa	z2	-	-	-	0T 1z—2	
17	Masahiro Higuchi	z6	-	-	-	0T 1z—6	
18	Shinichiro Nomura	-	-	-	-	0T 0z——	
18	Yuki Najima	-	-	-	-	0T 0z——	
18	Taisei Homma	-	-	-	-	0T 0z——	

=== Women ===
The women's bouldering semifinals took place on 27 January 2019.

Rank	Athlete	Boulder				Total	Notes
Rank	Athlete	1	2	3	4	Total	Notes
1	Mao Nakamura	T2 z2	T1 z1	T4 z2	-	3T 3z 7 5	Q
2	Futaba Ito	z1	T1 z1	T1 z1	z2	2T 4z 2 5	Q
3	Akiyo Noguchi	T1 z1	T1 z1	z3	z1	2T 4z 2 6	Q
4	Miho Nonaka	T1 z1	z3	T2 z2	z1	2T 4z 3 7	Q
5	Nanako Kura	z6	T3 z3	T5 z4	-	2T 3z 8 13	Q
6	Natsumi Hirano	-	T4 z2	T7 z7	-	2T 2z 11 9	Q
7	Serika Okawachi	z4	T6 z6	z6	z1	1T 4z 6 17	
7	Ai Mori	T6 z6	z8	z2	z1	1T 4z 6 17	
9	Natsuki Tanii	z5	T1 z1	z6	-	1T 3z 1 12	
10	Mei Kotake	-	z1	T1 z1	-	1T 2z 1 2	
11	Saki Kikuchi	-	T2 z2	z1	-	1T 2z 2 3	
12	Aya Sugawara	z4	-	T2 z2	-	1T 2z 2 6	
13	Hana Koike	-	T2 z2	z7	-	1T 2z 2 9	
14	Saari Watanabe	-	z2	T5 z2	-	1T 2z 5 4	
15	Risa Ota	z1	z2	z5	-	0T 3z—8	
16	Momoka Kaneko	z2	-	z3	-	0T 2z—5	
17	Hana Kudo	z5	-	z1	-	0T 2z—6	
18	Sana Ogura	-	z3	z4	-	0T 2z—7	
19	Karin Kojima	-	-	-	-	0T 0z——	
19	Yuki Hiroshige	-	-	-	-	0T 0z——	

== Qualifications ==
=== Men ===
The men's bouldering qualifications took place on 26 January 2019.

Rank	Athlete	Boulder					Total	Notes
Rank	Athlete	1	2	3	4	5	Total	Notes
1	Keita Dohi	T1 z1	T1 z1	T3 z3	T3 z1	T1 z1	5T 5z 9 7	Q
1	Rei Sugimoto	T1 z1	T3 z3	z2	T1 z1	T1 z1	4T 5z 6 8	Q
3	Tomoa Narasaki	T1 z1	T1 z1	T5 z5	T1 z1	T1 z1	5T 5z 9 9	Q
3	Kokoro Fujii	z3	T1 z1	T3 z1	T1 z1	T2 z2	4T 5z 7 8	Q
5	Yuji Fujiwaki	T1 z1	T1 z1	T2 z2	T2 z2	T4 z4	5T 5z 10 10	Q
5	Meichi Narasaki	T1 z1	T1 z1	z2	z1	T1 z1	3T 5z 3 6	Q
7	Ryuichi Murai	T1 z1	T1 z1	T1 z1	T1 z1	z3	4T 5z 4 7	Q
7	Keita Watabe	T2 z1	T4 z2	z2	z2	T2 z2	3T 5z 7 9	Q
9	Tomoaki Takata	T1 z1	T4 z3	z3	T2 z1	T2 z2	4T 5z 9 10	Q
9	Yoshiyuki Ogata	z2	T4 z1	z2	T1 z1	T3 z3	3T 5z 8 9	Q
11	Taisei Ishimatsu	T1 z1	T1 z1	-	T1 z1	T1 z1	4T 4z 4 4	Q
11	Taisei Homma	T2 z1	z1	z1	z1	T1 z1	2T 5z 3 5	Q
13	Rei Kawamata	T1 z1	T1 z1	-	T2 z1	T1 z1	4T 4z 7 5	Q
13	Masahiro Higuchi	T2 z1	z2	z1	z1	T1 z1	2T 5z 3 6	Q
15	Yuya Kitae	T1 z1	T2 z2	z2	T1 z1	-	3T 4z 4 6	Q
15	Yuki Najima	T3 z1	z2	z4	z1	T1 z1	2T 5z 4 9	Q
17	Soya Shimada	T1 z1	T1 z1	T3 z1	z1	-	3T 4z 5 4	Q
17	Shinichiro Nomura	T2 z1	T1 z1	T2 z1	z1	-	3T 4z 5 4	Q
17	Yuki Hada	z5	T2 z1	z1	z1	T2 z2	2T 5z 4 10	Q
20	Sohta Amagasa	T3 z2	z2	z1	T2 z2	z3	2T 5z 5 10	Q
21	Makoto Yamauchi	T2 z1	T3 z3	-	T1 z1	z4	3T 4z 6 9	
21	Ryohei Kameyama	T5 z2	z1	z1	z2	T3 z2	2T 5z 8 8	
23	Ao Yurikusa	T8 z2	T3 z3	T4 z4	z1	-	3T 4z 15 10	
23	Yuta Imaizumi	T5 z1	z1	z5	z2	T5 z4	2T 5z 10 13	
25	Kai Harada	T2 z2	T2 z2	z4	z1	z2	2T 5z 4 11	
25	Ryoga Tsukada	z1	z1	z1	z4	T2 z1	1T 5z 2 8	
27	Toru Kofukuda	z3	T2 z2	z1	z1	T4 z4	2T 5z 6 11	
27	Shuta Tanaka	z5	z1	z1	z2	T2 z2	1T 5z 2 11	
29	Taiga Sakamoto	T4 z3	z4	-	z1	T2 z2	2T 4z 6 10	
29	Atsushi Shimizu	z1	z1	z1	z2	T3 z2	1T 5z 3 7	
31	Isamu Kawabata	z3	T3 z3	-	z5	T9 z9	2T 4z 12 20	
31	Hibiki Yamauchi	z2	T3 z3	z3	z1	z4	1T 5z 3 13	
33	Tomoki Musha	T2 z2	T3 z1	-	z2	-	2T 3z 5 5	
33	Hiroto Shimizu	T4 z4	z2	z2	z1	z2	1T 5z 4 11	
35	Shuhei Yukimaru	z1	T2 z2	-	z1	z8	1T 4z 2 12	
35	Naoki Tsurumoto	-	z6	z1	z4	T1 z1	1T 4z 1 12	
37	Daisuke Konishi	-	T1 z1	z1	z1	-	1T 3z 1 3	
37	Ryoga Nakadake	-	z4	z3	z3	T2 z2	1T 4z 2 12	
39	Shuhei Uchida	z2	T2 z2	-	z1	-	1T 3z 2 5	
39	Gen Sasaki	z6	z1	z1	z2	z1	0T 5z—11	
41	Hajime Takeda	-	T2 z1	-	z5	z8	1T 3z 2 14	
41	Hayato Nakamura	z1	z1	z3	z6	z2	0T 5z—13	
43	Ryosuke Hibino	z2	T3 z3	-	z1	-	1T 3z 3 6	
43	Yuta Watanabe	z7	z1	z1	z3	z5	0T 5z—17	
45	Katsura Konishi	-	T3 z3	-	z1	z3	1T 3z 3 7	
45	Kaya Otaka	z1	z2	z2	-	z3	0T 4z—8	
47	Yuki Sakamoto	-	T2 z2	-	z1	-	1T 2z 2 3	
47	Daiki Sano	z2	z3	z2	z3	-	0T 4z—10	
49	Yuki Yamauchi	z2	z3	-	z3	-	0T 3z—8	
49	Koryu Watanabe	z1	z3	z6	z2	-	0T 4z—12	
51	Tatsuma Yamaguchi	z2	-	-	z1	-	0T 2z—3	
51	Takumi Osato	-	z1	-	z2	-	0T 2z—3	
51	Yujiro Shiraishi	-	z3	z2	z6	z5	0T 4z—16	
54	Kotaro Hirasawa	z4	z3	z8	z5	-	0T 4z—20	
55	Taito Nakagami	-	z5	-	z1	-	0T 2z—6	
55	Hisui Shirasaka	z5	z1	-	-	-	0T 2z—6	
55	Ryo Omasa	-	z6	z5	z3	z7	0T 4z—21	
58	Ryoei Nukui	z2	z1	z2	-	-	0T 3z—5	
59	Yuma Wakahara	-	z4	-	z4	-	0T 2z—8	
59	Koki Shirakawa	z1	z4	z3	-	-	0T 3z—8	
61	Hiroki Kawakami	-	-	-	-	z3	0T 1z—3	
61	Ryo Inoue	-	z5	z2	z4	-	0T 3z—11	
63	Kazuma Ise	-	-	-	z5	-	0T 1z—5	
63	Keita Mineoi	-	-	-	z5	-	0T 1z—5	
63	Masaaki Sasaki	-	-	z3	z1	-	0T 2z—4	
66	Masaki Saito	z1	z8	-	-	-	0T 2z—9	
67	Natsuki Inutake	-	-	-	-	-	0T 0z——	
67	Sorato Anraku	-	-	-	-	-	0T 0z——	
67	Shigeo Iwai	-	z5	-	z5	-	0T 2z—10	
70	Shotaro Maeda	-	-	z1	-	-	0T 1z—1	
71	Kantaro Ito	-	z3	-	-	-	0T 1z—3	

=== Women ===
The women's bouldering qualifications took place on 26 January 2019.

Rank	Athlete	Boulder					Total	Notes
Rank	Athlete	1	2	3	4	5	Total	Notes
1	Akiyo Noguchi	T1 z1	T1 z1	T1 z1	z2	T1 z1	5T 5z 7 7	Q
1	Miho Nonaka	T1 z1	T1 z1	T1 z1	z7	T1 z1	4T 5z 5 5	Q
3	Hirano Natsumi	T1 z1	T2 z2	T1 z1	T2 z1	T2 z2	5T 5z 8 7	Q
3	Futaba Ito	T1 z1	T1 z1	T4 z3	z1	T1 z1	4T 5z 7 7	Q
5	Mei Kotake	T1 z1	T4 z4	T1 z1	T1 z1	T1 z1	5T 5z 9 8	Q
5	Natsuki Tanii	T1 z1	T5 z5	z4	T1 z1	T1 z1	4T 5z 8 12	Q
7	Hana Koike	T1 z1	T1 z1	T3 z1	z1	T1 z1	4T 5z 6 5	Q
7	Ai Mori	T2 z1	T3 z3	T2 z2	z6	T1 z1	4T 5z 8 13	Q
9	Saki Kikuchi	T1 z1	T4 z4	T2 z1	z2	T1 z1	4T 5z 8 9	Q
9	Hana Kudo	T2 z1	T2 z1	T3 z1	z1	T2 z1	4T 5z 9 5	Q
11	Mao Nakamura	T1 z1	T1 z1	T5 z2	z2	T2 z2	4T 5z 9 8	Q
11	Sana Ogura	T3 z1	T2 z2	z7	z3	T2 z1	3T 5z 7 14	Q
13	Yuki Hiroshige	T1 z1	T1 z1	T2 z2	-	T1 z1	3T 5z 3 6	Q
13	Nanako Kura	T1 z1	T4 z2	z7	z6	T2 z2	3T 5z 7 18	Q
15	Saari Watanabe	T2 z1	T3 z3	z2	z6	T1 z1	3T 5z 6 13	Q
15	Karin Kojima	T1 z1	T10 z10	z9	-	T2 z2	3T 4z 13 22	Q
17	Serika Okawachi	T2 z1	T4 z4	z2	z1	T4 z4	3T 5z 10 12	Q
17	Risa Ota	T1 z1	T2 z2	-	-	T1 z1	3T 3z 4 4	Q
19	Momoka Kaneko	T3 z2	T2 z2	z1	-	T2 z2	3T 4z 7 7	Q
19	Aya Sugawara	T3 z1	T2 z2	z8	z4	z1	2T 5z 5 16	Q
21	Junko Kitawaki	z1	T2 z2	z7	z1	T4 z2	2T 5z 6 13	
21	Ayari Sakamoto	T3 z1	-	T2 z2	z1	z4	2T 4z 5 8	
23	Saeko Sugimura	T2 z2	T4 z4	z1	z3	z5	2T 5z 6 15	
23	Tomoko Kajima	T2 z1	T2 z2	-	z1	-	2T 3z 4 4	
25	Moeka Niitaka	z2	T4 z4	z6	z1	T10 z5	2T 5z 14 18	
25	Miku Ishii	T1 z1	T3 z3	-	-	z1	2T 3z 4 5	
27	Kokoro Takata	z2	T4 z4	z1	-	T3 z2	2T 4z 7 9	
27	Honoka Moriwaki	z1	T6 z6	-	-	T2 z1	2T 3z 8 8	
29	Kao Iwasaki	z1	T4 z4	z4	-	T6 z6	2T 4z 10 15	
29	Ayane Sakai	T1 z1	-	-	-	T1 z1	2T 2z 2 2	
31	Misato Nishikori	z1	T1 z1	z1	z1	z11	1T 5z 1 15	
31	Kiki Matsuda	T1 z1	z8	-	z4	z4	1T 4z 1 17	
33	Nao Mori	z1	z8	z4	z1	T7 z7	1T 5z 7 21	
33	Moemi Takikawa	z1	T2 z2	-	-	-	1T 2z 2 3	
35	Sora Ito	z1	T1 z1	-	z2	z2	1T 4z 1 6	
35	Yurina Honda	z1	z7	-	-	z2	0T 3z—10	
37	Homare Toda	z1	z5	z2	-	T2 z2	1T 4z 2 10	
37	Shuri Nishida	z3	z9	-	-	z1	0T 3z—13	
39	Narumi Ogawa	z3	T8 z7	z4	-	z2	1T 4z 8 16	
39	Momoko Abe	z2	z12	-	z1	-	0T 3z—15	
41	Momoka Miyajima	z1	T8 z8	-	z1	z10	1T 4z 8 20	
41	Ayano Soga	z1	z2	-	-	-	0T 2z—3	
43	Hana Kogure	z1	z3	-	z1	z1	0T 4z—6	
43	Miu Kurita	z1	z5	-	-	-	0T 2z—6	
45	Akiko Kawabata	z1	z6	-	z2	-	0T 3z—5	
45	None Kikuchi	z1	z9	-	-	-	0T 2z—8	
47	Yuka Higuchi	z1	-	-	z2	-	0T 2z—3	
47	Azumi Iida	-	z4	-	-	-	0T 1z—4	
49	Mia Aoyagi	z3	-	-	-	-	0T 1z—3	
