= 2018 Combined Japan Cup =

Sport climbing competition

- Location: Morioka city, Iwate Prefecture
- Dates: 23 – 24 June 2018

Champions
- Men: Tomoa Narasaki
- Women: Akiyo Noguchi

The 2018 Combined Japan Cup was the first of the competition. It was organized by the JMSCA (Japan Mountaineering and Sport Climbing Association). It was held from 23 to 24 June 2018 in Morioka city, Iwate Prefecture. The athletes competed in combined format of three disciplines: speed, bouldering, and lead. The winner for men was Tomoa Narasaki and for women was Akiyo Noguchi.

== Schedule ==
Women		Men	
23 June (Qualifications)
09:00 ～ 09:20	Speed	10:05 ～ 10:35	Speed
10:10 ～ 11:45	Boulder	11:15 ～ 13:25	Lead
12:45 ～ 13:50	Lead	14:40 ～ 17:20	Boulder
24 June (Finals)
09:30 ～ 09:45	Speed	13:45 ～ 14:00	Speed
10:30 ～ 12:06	Boulder	14:45 ～ 16:21	Boulder
12:45 ～ 13:15	Lead	17:00 ～ 17:30	Lead

== Men ==
FINALS						QUALIFICATIONS					
Rank	Name	Final Points	Final Lead	Final Boulder	Final Speed	Rank	Name	Points	Lead	Boulder	Speed
1	Tomoa Narasaki	4.00	1. 37+	4. 3T5 3z4	1. 6.87	1	Tomoa Narasaki	42	21	2	1
2	Meichi Narasaki	6.00	2. 35+	1. 4T7 4z6	3. 7.19	2	Meichi Narasaki	52	1	13	4
3	Yoshiyuki Ogata	12.00	3. 35+	2. 3T14 4z11	2. 7.69	4	Yoshiyuki Ogata	140	7	10	2
4	Kai Harada	72.00	6. 35	3. 3T14 4z13	4. fall	6	Kai Harada	225	9	5	5
5	Rei Sugimoto	120.00	4. 35+	5. 3T11 3z8	6. 12.73	5	Rei Sugimoto	195	5	3	13
6	Tomoaki Takata	150.00	5. 35+	6. 2T5 4z10	5. 11.9	3	Tomoaki Takata	72	3	1	24
						7	Masahiro Higuchi	242	2	11	11
						8	Kokoro Fujii	336	8	7	6
						9	Ryoei Nukui	360	10	12	3
						10	Keita Dohi	600	15	4	10
						11	Shuta Tanaka	1,080	6	15	12
						12	Yuta Imaizumi	1,232	11	14	8
						13	Taisei Ishimatsu	1,512	18	6	14
						14	Katsura Konishi	1,620	12	9	15
						15	Hiroto Shimizu	1,692	4	23.5	18
						16	Daichi Nakashima	2,327.5	19	17.5	7
						17	Hajime Takeda	3,933	23	19	9
						18	Rei Kawamata	4,800	24	8	25
						19	Hiroki Kawakami	5,145	14	17.5	21
						20	Kazuma Ise	5,193.5	13	23.5	17
						21	Kentaro Maeda	6,392	17	23.5	16
						22	Kantaro Ito	6,688	22	16	19
						23	Shuta Kon	6,720	16	21	20
						24	Naoki Tsurumoto	8,800	20	20	22
						25	Takato Mikami	13,512.5	25	23.5	23

== Women ==
FINALS						QUALIFICATIONS					
Rank	Name	Final Points	Final Lead	Final Boulder	Final Speed	Rank	Name	Point	Lead	Boulder	Speed
1	Akiyo Noguchi	6.00	2. 37+	1. 4T6 4z6	3. 12.06	2	Akiyo Noguchi	8	2	1	4
2	Futaba Ito	9.00	3. 36+	3. 2T2 3z3	1. 10.58	1	Futaba Ito	6	3	2	1
3	Natsuki Tanii	16.00	1. 39+	4. 1T1 2z2	4. 13.00	4	Natsuki Tanii	28	1	4	7
4	Miho Nonaka	20.00	5. 21	2. 3T3 4z7	2. fall	3	Miho Nonaka	24	4	3	2
5	Nanako Kura	120.00	4. 26+	5. 1T3 2z7	6. fall	5	Nanako Kura	108	6	6	3
6	Miu Kurita	180.00	6. 14+	6. 0T 0z	5. 13.36	6	Miu Kurita	210	7	5	6
						7	Hana Kudo	405	5	9	9
						8	Kokoro Takata	560	8	7	10
						9	Yuka Higuchi	576	9	8	8
						10	Rin Ninomiya	660	11	12	5
						11	Akane Kinoshita	1,320	10	11	12
						12	Chisato Kanazawa	1,690	13	10	13
						13	Shuri Nishida	1,716	12	13	11
