= 2020 Combined Japan Cup =

- Location: Saijō city, Ehime Prefecture
- Dates: 26 – 27 December 2020

Champions
- Men: Kokoro Fujii
- Women: Miho Nonaka

The 2020 Combined Japan Cup was held from 26 to 27 December 2020 in Saijō city, Ehime Prefecture. It was organized by the JMSCA (Japan Mountaineering and Sport Climbing Association). The athletes competed in combined format of three disciplines: speed, bouldering, and lead. The winner for men was Kokoro Fujii and for women was Miho Nonaka.

== Schedule ==
Men		Women	
26 December (Qualifications)
09:00 ～ 09:15	Speed	11:35 ～ 11:55	Speed
09:40 ～ 11:05	Bouldering	12:20 ～ 14:20	Bouldering
12:15 ～ 13:05	Lead	15:25 ～ 16:55	Lead
27 December (Finals)
09:05 ～ 09:25	Speed	13:15 ～ 13:35	Speed
09:55 ～ 11:19	Bouldering	14:05 ～ 15:29	Bouldering
11:45 ～ 12:25	Lead	15:55 ～ 16:35	Lead

== Competition format ==
It was held to simulate the latest Olympic combined format. Athletes competed in a combined format of three disciplines: speed, bouldering, and lead. The ranks of the three disciplines were multiplied to give combined points; athletes with the lowest points won. Eight competitors with the lowest total combined points proceeded to the final round.

Disciplines	Qualifications	Finals (8)	Notes
Speed	Athletes climbed twice in two different lanes on a standardized 15-meter wall. Best times counted.	Athletes were seeded based on the speed qualification results. Athletes climbed head-to-head with each other in a bracket format.	All competitors ran in the same number of races.
Bouldering	Four boulder problems. Time limit for each boulder was five minutes.	Three boulder problems. Time limit for each boulder was four minutes.	Score was determined by number of tops, number of zones, attempts to tops, and attempts to zones in decreasing order of importance.
Lead	A single lead route.	A single lead route. Time limit to climb the route was six minutes.	Score was determined by the highest point reached and the amount of time spent climbing the route.

== Men ==
=== Qualifications ===
Rank	Name	Speed			Bouldering													Lead			CP
Rank	Name	A	B	R	1		2		3		4		T	Z	aT	aZ	R	HR	TFT	R	CP
1	Yuta Imaizumi	~~FALL~~	6.97	2	T5	Z5	**	Z1	T1	Z1	T1	Z1	3T	4Z	7	8	2	40+	3.06	6	24
2	Kokoro Fujii	8.27	~~FALL~~	9	T1	Z1	**	Z1	T1	Z1	T1	Z1	3T	4Z	3	4	1	43+	4.09	3	27
3	Masahiro Higuchi	~~FALL~~	8.45	10	T6	Z6	**	Z2	T2	Z1	T1	Z1	3T	4Z	9	10	3	43+	3.46	2	60
4	Hajime Takeda	6.62	~~6.74~~	1	T5	Z5	**	**	T5	Z4	T3	Z3	3T	3Z	13	12	7	22	1.41	10	70
5	Hiroto Shimizu	7.85	~~FALL~~	8	**	**	**	**	T3	Z1	**	**	1T	1Z	3	1	10	TOP	5.47	1	80
6	Ao Yurikusa	7.20	7.20	4	**	**	**	Z1	T4	Z1	**	Z3	1T	3Z	4	5	8	42+	3.51	4	128
7	Ryo Omasa	~~9.28~~	7.01	3	**	**	T6	Z6	T3	Z1	T1	Z1	3T	3Z	10	8	6	33+	4.10	9	162
8	Keita Dohi	~~9.54~~	7.23	6	T8	Z8	**	Z6	T1	Z1	T3	Z3	3T	4Z	12	18	4	40+	4.09	8	192
9	Ryoei Nukui	7.21	~~7.33~~	5	T11	Z6	**	**	**	Z1	**	**	1T	2Z	11	7	9	41+	3.56	5	225
10	Yuya Kitae	~~8.97~~	7.64	7	T11	Z11	**	Z2	T1	Z1	T5	Z5	3T	4Z	17	19	5	40+	3.19	7	245

=== Finals ===
Rank	Name	Speed							Bouldering					Lead			CP
Rank	Name	Quarterfinals		Semifinals		Finals		R	1	2	3	Result	R	HR	TFT	R	CP
Rank	Name	R	T	R	T	R	T	R	1	2	3	Result	R	HR	TFT	R	CP
1st place, gold medalist(s)	Kokoro Fujii	3	7.08	6	8.37	10	7.91	5	T1 Z1	Z1	T1 Z1	2T 3Z 2 3	1	42+	3.38	3	15
2nd place, silver medalist(s)	Masahiro Higuchi	1	7.95	5	8.08	9	10.12	8	Z1	Z3	T3 Z3	1T 3Z 3 7	4	TOP	3.48	1	32
3rd place, bronze medalist(s)	Ao Yurikusa	2	7.03	7	7.13	12	8.05	1	-	Z1	-	0T 1Z 0 1	7	41+	3.51	5	35
4	Yuta Imaizumi	3	7.01	8	7.00	11	7.26	3	Z1	Z1	Z1	0T 3Z 0 3	5	41+	3.48	4	60
5	Keita Dohi	2	7.62	5	7.39	10	8.19	6	T1 Z1	T3 Z1	Z3	2T 3Z 4 5	2	41+	3.59	6	72
6	Hajime Takeda	1	7.09	7	fall	11	7.53	4	-	T3 Z1	T4 Z4	2T 2Z 7 5	3	29+	3.01	7	84
7	Hiroto Shimizu	4	8.30	6	11.53	9	8.99	7	Z1	Z2	Z4	0T 3Z 0 7	6	TOP	4.39	2	84
8	Ryo Omasa	4	7.14	8	6.64	12	9.68	2	-	Z3	-	0T 1Z 0 3	8	16	1.55	8	128

== Women ==
=== Qualifications ===
Rank	Name	Speed			Bouldering													Lead			CP
Rank	Name	A	B	R	1		2		3		4		T	Z	aT	aZ	R	Hold	Time	R	CP
1	Miho Nonaka	8.40	~~8.46~~	1	T2	Z1	T5	Z1	T1	Z1	T1	Z1	4T	4Z	9	4	1	37+	3.10	3	3
2	Natsuki Tanii	12.97	~~13.43~~	8	T1	Z1	T9	Z6	**	Z1	T1	Z1	3T	4Z	11	9	5	TOP	4.34	1	40
3	Ai Mori	16.73	~~17.15~~	15	T1	Z1	T7	Z6	T1	Z1	T1	Z1	4T	4Z	10	9	2	TOP	5.48	2	60
4	Moe Takiguchi	~~13.24~~	11.21	3	T1	Z1	T3	Z3	**	Z3	T2	Z2	3T	4Z	6	9	3	27+	3.13	11	99
5	Nanako Kura	~~9.76~~	9.67	2	T1	Z1	T3	Z1	**	**	T3	Z3	3T	3Z	7	5	7	30+	3.54	8	112
6	Mia Aoyagi	~~17.96~~	11.59	5	T1	Z1	**	Z1	**	**	T1	Z1	2T	3Z	2	3	10	32	3.33	5	250
7	Saki Kikuchi	~~13.49~~	12.24	6	**	Z1	T5	Z2	**	Z1	T1	Z1	2T	4Z	6	5	8	30+	3.19	7	336
8	Mao Nakamura	~~11.95~~	11.34	4	T1	Z1	T4	Z2	**	**	T1	Z1	3T	3Z	6	4	6	17	2.06	15	360
9	Miu Kurita	~~14.04~~	13.12	9	**	Z1	**	Z1	**	**	**	**	0T	2Z	--	2	15	35+	4.25	4	540
10	Natsumi Hirano	~~13.98~~	13.89	12	T3	Z1	T5	Z2	**	Z4	T1	Z1	3T	4Z	9	8	4	12.5+	1.05	16	768
11	Ryu Nakagawa	13.25	~~14.30~~	11	**	Z1	T6	Z2	**	Z3	T2	Z2	2T	4Z	8	8	9	29	3.03	9	891
12	Miu Kakizaki	~~18.90~~	FS	16	**	Z3	**	Z8	**	**	T1	Z1	1T	3Z	1	12	11	32	5.34	6	1056
13	Yuka Higuchi	12.50	~~14.99~~	7	**	Z1	**	Z4	**	**	**	**	0T	2Z	--	5	16	27+	4.19	12	1344
14	Kokoro Takata	14.03	~~14.21~~	13	**	Z3	**	Z3	**	**	T3	Z3	1T	3Z	3	9	12	28	3.30	10	1560
15	Momoka Miyajima	~~13.59~~	13.19	10	**	Z1	**	Z3	**	**	**	Z2	0T	3Z	--	6	13	18	2.56	13	1690
16	Risa Ota	14.35	~~14.77~~	14	**	Z1	**	Z5	**	**	**	Z1	0T	3Z	--	7	14	17+	2.29	14	2744

=== Finals ===
Rank	Name	Speed							Bouldering					Lead			CP
Rank	Name	Quarterfinals		Semifinals		Finals		R	1	2	3	Result	R	HR	TFT	R	CP
Rank	Name	R	T	R	T	R	T	R	1	2	3	Result	R	HR	TFT	R	CP
1st place, gold medalist(s)	Miho Nonaka	1	8.72	7	8.52	12	10.47	2	T1 Z1	T2 Z2	Z1	2T 3Z 3 4	1	28+	2.58	1	2
2nd place, silver medalist(s)	Nanako Kura	3	10.41	8	9.89	12	9.33	1	Z2	T5 Z3	-	1T 2Z 5 5	3	18+	2.19	6	18
3rd place, bronze medalist(s)	Natsuki Tanii	3	12.76	6	12.19	9	15.47	7	T2 Z2	T3 Z3	Z3	2T 3Z 5 8	2	18+	1.43	4	56
4	Moe Takiguchi	4	12.71	6	11.40	10	11.18	5	Z1	Z6	-	0T 2Z 0 7	7	27	4.34	2	70
5	Mia Aoyagi	2	11.34	7	11.74	11	11.59	3	-	Z2	-	0T 1Z 0 2	8	23+	1.52	3	72
6	Saki Kikuchi	4	12.67	8	12.12	11	12.50	4	Z2	Z2	Z2	0T 3Z 0 6	6	18+	1.52	5	120
7	Mao Nakamura	2	13.69	5	13.23	10	11.20	6	Z2	Z2	Z2	0T 3Z 0 6	5	16+	1.27	7	210
8	Ai Mori	1	11.91	5	16.84	9	16.75	8	Z1	Z2	Z3	0T 3Z 0 6	4	10+	0.41	8	256
