= Climbing Japan Cup =

Competition climbing event

Climbing Japan Cup or Japan Climbing Cup is a series of climbing competitions held annually and organized by the JMSCA (Japan Mountaineering and Sport Climbing Association). The athletes compete in three disciplines: lead, bouldering and speed. The first Lead Japan Cup was held in 1987. The first Bouldering Japan Cup was held in 2005. The first Combined Japan Cup was held in 2018. The first Speed Japan Cup was held in 2019.

== Lead ==
Lead Japan Cup (in Japanese)

Edition	Y.M.D	Location	Women	Men
11	1997.10.04-05	Ōtake city, Hiroshima Prefecture	Rie Kimura	Dai Koyamada
12	1998.10.03-04	Katano city, Osaka Prefecture	Hoshiko Nakagai	Tomohiro Shibata
13	1999.10.10-11	Hadano city, Kanagawa Prefecture	Rie Kimura	Takaaki Tsuiki
14	2000.11.04-05	Kazo city, Saitama Prefecture	Yasue Minamiura	Akito Matsushima
15	2001.08.18-19	Nanto city, Toyama Prefecture	Yuka Kobayashi	Takuya Takeda
16	2002.09.15-16	Sendai city, Miyagi Prefecture	Yuka Kobayashi	Hidekazu Ito
17	2003.09.27-28	Nagaoka district, Kōchi Prefecture	Yuko Hirohata	Keita Mogaki
18	2004.06.12-13	Sapporo city, Hokkaido Prefecture	Yuka Kobayashi	Yoshinobu Shinozaki
19	2005.11.05-06	Kazo city, Saitama Prefecture	Akiyo Noguchi	Yuji Hirayama
20	2006.09.02-03	Maniwa city, Okayama Prefecture	Akiyo Noguchi	Sachi Amma
21	2007.06.02-03	Hadano city, Kanagawa Prefecture	Akiyo Noguchi	Sachi Amma
22	2008.06.07-08	Taketa city, Ōita Prefecture	Momoka Oda	Hidekazu Ito
23	2009.06.06-07	Joetsu city, Niigata Prefecture	Yuka Kobayashi	Sachi Amma
24	2010.06.05-06	Inzai city, Chiba Prefecture	Momoka Oda	Sachi Amma
25	2011.06.04-05	Yamaguchi city, Yamaguchi Prefecture	Momoka Oda	Sachi Amma
26	2012.06.09-10	Gifu city, Gifu Prefecture	Momoka Oda	Masahiro Higuchi
27	2013.06.01-02	Higashikurume city, Tokyo	Yuka Kobayashi	Daisuke Kasahara
28	2014.06.07-08	Omura city, Nagasaki Prefecture	Risa Ota	Akito Matsushima
29	2015.06.06-07	Minabe town, Wakayama Prefecture	Aika Tajima	Masahiro Higuchi
30	2016.06.11-12	Morioka city, Iwate Prefecture	Ai Mori	Keiichiro Korenaga
31	2017.06.10-11	Saijo city, Ehime Prefecture	Ai Mori	Taisei Homma
32	2019.03.02-03	Inzai city, Chiba Prefecture	Akiyo Noguchi	Kokoro Fujii
33	2020.08.09-11	Morioka city, Iwate Prefecture	Ai Mori	Hidemasa Nishida
34	2021.03.26-28	Inzai city, Chiba Prefecture	Ai Mori	Satone Yoshida
35	2022.02.12-13	Inzai city, Chiba Prefecture	Ai Mori	Taisei Homma
36	2023.02.25-26	Inzai city, Chiba Prefecture	Ai Mori	Shion Omata
37	2024.02.23-24	Taku city, Saga Prefecture	Ai Mori	Shion Omata
38	2025.03.1-2	Iga city, Mie Prefecture	Ai Mori	Sorato Anraku
39	2026.03.07-8	Iga city, Mie Prefecture	Ai Mori	Neo Suzuki

== Bouldering ==
Bouldering Japan Cup (in Japanese)

Akiyo Noguchi won the most, with 9 consecutive wins from 2005 to 2014 (1st-9th). In 2017, Futaba Ito then 14-year-old, became the youngest athlete to win the Bouldering Japan Cup. There were no male athletes who won more than once until Kokoro Fujii won three times consecutively from 2016 to 2018 and then again in 2021.

Edition	Y.M.D	Location	Women	Men
1	2005.09.23-24	Kobe city, Hyogo Prefecture	Akiyo Noguchi	Keita Mogaki
2	2006.12.23-24	Kazo city, Saitama Prefecture	Akiyo Noguchi	Tatsuya Muraoka
3	2007.12.01-02	Taketa city, Oita Prefecture	Akiyo Noguchi	Kazuma Watanabe
4	2009.02.28-03.01	Kawagoe city, Saitama Prefecture	Akiyo Noguchi	Masatoshi Sugita
5	2009.11.21-22	Fukaya city, Saitama Prefecture	Akiyo Noguchi	Tsukuru Hori
6	2011.02.26-27	Nagasaki city, Nagasaki Prefecture	Akiyo Noguchi	Atsushi Shimizu
7	2012.02.25-26	Nagasaki city, Nagasaki Prefecture	Akiyo Noguchi	Tatsumi Nitta
8	2013.02.23-24	Komazawa Olympic Park, Setagaya ward, Tokyo	Akiyo Noguchi	Sachi Amma
9	2014.02.22-23	Shizuoka city, Shizuoka Prefecture	Akiyo Noguchi	Makoto Yamauchi
10	2015.02.21-22	Fukaya city, Saitama Prefecture	Aika Tajima	Rei Sugimoto
11	2016.01.30-31	Kazo city, Saitama Prefecture	Akiyo Noguchi	Kokoro Fujii
12	2017.01.28-29	Yoyogi National Gymnasium, Shibuya ward, Tokyo	Futaba Ito	Kokoro Fujii
13	2018.02.03-04	Komazawa Olympic Park, Setagaya ward, Tokyo	Akiyo Noguchi	Kokoro Fujii
14	2019.01.26-27	Komazawa Olympic Park, Setagaya ward, Tokyo	Miho Nonaka	Taisei Ishimatsu
15	2020.02.08-09	Komazawa Olympic Park, Setagaya ward, Tokyo	Futaba Ito	Kai Harada
16	2021.01.30-31	Komazawa Olympic Park, Setagaya ward, Tokyo	Ai Mori	Kokoro Fujii
17	2022.02.5-6	Yokkaichi Dome, Mie Prefecture	Nanako Kura	Tomoa Narasaki
18	2023.02.4-5	Komazawa Olympic Park, Setagaya ward, Tokyo	Futaba Ito	Meichi Narasaki
19	2024.02.10-12	Taku city, Saga Prefecture	Mao Nakamura	Yoshiyuki Ogata
20	2025.02.1-2	Komazawa Olympic Park, Setagaya ward, Tokyo	Miho Nonaka	Sorato Anraku
21	2026.01.31-2026.02.01	Komazawa Olympic Park, Setagaya ward, Tokyo	Futaba Ito	Meichi Narasaki

== Speed ==
Speed Japan Cup (in Japanese)

Edition	Y.M.D	Location	Women	Men
1	2019.02.10	Akishima city, Tokyo	Miho Nonaka	Yudai Ikeda
2	2020.02.22	Akishima city, Tokyo	Futaba Ito	Keita Dohi
3	2021.03.06	Kameoka city, Kyoto	Akiyo Noguchi	Tomoa Narasaki
4	2022.03.06	Kameoka city, Kyoto	Fumika Kawakami	Ryo Omasa
5	2023.03.12	Chiba (city), Chiba	Karin Hayashi	Jun Yasukawa
6	2024.02.25	Taku city, Saga	Ai Takeuchi	Jun Yasukawa
7	2025.02.15-16	Taku city, Saga	Karin Hayashi	Shuto Fujino
8	2026.02.14-15	Taku city, Saga	Karin Hayashi	Ryo Omasa

== Combined ==
Combined Japan Cup (in Japanese)

Edition	Y.M.D	Location	Women	Men
1	2018.06.23-24	Morioka city, Iwate Prefecture	Akiyo Noguchi	Tomoa Narasaki
2	2019.05.25-26	Saijo city, Ehime Prefecture	Miho Nonaka	Tomoa Narasaki
3	2020.12.26-27	Saijo city, Ehime Prefecture	Miho Nonaka	Kokoro Fujii
4	2021.06.18-19	Morioka city, Iwate Prefecture	Akiyo Noguchi	Tomoa Narasaki
5	2022.11.12-13	Saijo city, Ehime Prefecture	Ai Mori	Sorato Anraku
6	2023.04.08-09	Kurayoshi city, Tottori Prefecture	Ai Mori	Sorato Anraku
