= 2021 Combined Japan Cup =

- Location: Morioka city, Iwate Prefecture
- Dates: 18 – 19 June 2021

Champions
- Men: Tomoa Narasaki
- Women: Akiyo Noguchi

The 2021 Combined Japan Cup was held from 18 to 19 June 2021 in Morioka city, Iwate Prefecture. It was organized by the JMSCA (Japan Mountaineering and Sport Climbing Association). The athletes competed in combined format of two disciplines of bouldering and lead, simulating the 2024 Paris Olympics format. The winner for men was Tomoa Narasaki and for women was Akiyo Noguchi.

== Schedule ==
Men		Women	
18 June (Friday)
11:10 - 13:35	Bouldering Qualification	10:40 - 12:55	Bouldering Qualification
14:30 - 16:20	Lead Qualification	13:50 - 15:30	Lead Qualification
19 June (Saturday)
13:50 - 15:30	Bouldering Final	08:50 - 10:30	Bouldering Final
16:40 - 17:30	Lead Final	11:40 - 12:30	Lead Final

== Competition format ==
It was held to simulate the 2024 Paris Olympics format. Eight competitors with the highest scores proceeded to the finals.

Disciplines	Qualifications	Finals	Notes
Bouldering	Four boulder problems. Time limit for each boulder was five minutes.	Three boulder problems. Time limit for each boulder was four minutes.	Score was determined by number of tops, number of zones, attempts to tops, and attempts to zones in decreasing order of importance.
Lead	A single lead route. Time limit to climb the route was six minutes.	A single lead route. Time limit to climb the route was six minutes.	Score was determined by the highest point/hold reached.

== Scoring ==
=== Bouldering ===
BPP	Top	Zone	For Tiebreaks	
BPP	Top	Zone	Attempt to Top	Attempt to Zone
Qualification	+25 points	+5 points	-0.1 point	-0.01 point
Final	+33 points	+8 points	-0.1 point	-0.01 point
BP = BPP x 100 / BMP

=== Lead ===
LPP	Hold	+
Qualification	+2.5 points	+0.5 point
Final	+2.5 points	+0.5 point
LP = LPP x 100 / LMP

== Men ==
=== Qualifications ===
Rank	Name	Bouldering						Lead			Total Points
Rank	Name	Top / Zone		Attempts		BPP	BP	Hold	LPP	LP	Total Points
1	Tomoaki Takata	4T	4Z	22	18	97.80	98.98	34+	85.50	87.69	186.68
2	Yuji Inoue	4T	4Z	12	9	98.80	100.00	31+	78.00	80.00	180.00
3	Sota Amagasa	3T	4Z	10	14	80.00	80.97	32+	80.50	82.56	163.53
4	Tomoa Narasaki	3T	3Z	3	3	74.70	75.60	34+	85.50	87.69	163.29
5	Kokoro Fujii	3T	3Z	4	4	74.60	75.50	34+	85.50	87.69	163.19
6	Rei Kawamata	3T	3Z	5	5	74.50	75.40	33+	83.00	85.12	160.53
7	Yoshiyuki Ogata	3T	3Z	10	10	74.00	74.89	33+	83.00	85.12	160.02
8	Katsura Konishi	3T	3Z	9	9	74.01	74.90	30+	75.50	77.43	152.34
9	Yuya Kitae	3T	3Z	9	7	74.03	74.92	30	75.00	76.92	151.85
10	Yuta Imaizumi	2T	3Z	5	11	55.00	55.66	32+	80.50	82.56	138.23
11	Ao Yurikusa	1T	3Z	2	16	34.80	35.22	TOP	97.50	100.00	135.22
12	Ryo Omasa	2T	2Z	9	5	49.10	49.69	33+	83.00	85.12	134.82
13	Rei Sugimoto	2T	2Z	5	5	49.50	50.10	30	75.00	76.92	127.02
14	Taisei Honma	1T	2Z	3	10	29.70	30.06	35+	88.00	90.25	120.31
15	Keita Dohi	1T	3Z	4	17	34.60	35.02	33+	83.00	85.12	120.14
16	Masahiro Higuchi	1T	2Z	7	13	29.30	29.65	35+	88.00	90.25	119.91
17	Kento Yamaguchi	1T	2Z	4	10	29.50	29.85	32+	80.50	82.56	112.42
18	Ryoei Nukui	1T	1Z	6	5	25.00	25.30	32	80.00	82.05	107.35
19	Meichi Narasaki	0T	2Z	--	6	10.00	10.12	33+	83.00	85.12	95.24
20	Keita Watabe	1T	2Z	4	6	29.54	29.89	25	62.50	64.10	94.00
21	Shuta Tanaka	0T	1Z	--	5	5.00	5.06	32+	80.50	82.56	87.62

=== Finals ===
Rank	Name	Bouldering						Lead			Total Points	Qual. Rank
Rank	Name	Top / Zone		Attempts		BPP	BP	Hold	LPP	LP	Total Points	Qual. Rank
1st place, gold medalist(s)	Tomoa Narasaki	2T	3Z	4	4	73.60	100.00	33+	83.00	100.00	200.00	4
2nd place, silver medalist(s)	Kokoro Fujii	2T	3Z	6	6	73.40	99.72	33+	83.00	100.00	199.72	5
3rd place, bronze medalist(s)	Yoshiyuki Ogata	1T	2Z	1	3	40.87	55.53	33+	83.00	100.00	155.53	7
4	Tomoaki Takata	1T	2Z	2	3	40.77	55.39	33	82.50	99.39	154.79	1
5	Sota Amagasa	1T	3Z	1	5	49.00	66.57	29+	73.00	87.95	154.52	3
6	Katsura Konishi	1T	2Z	1	2	40.88	55.54	31+	78.00	93.97	149.51	8
7	Yuji Inoue	1T	2Z	2	3	40.77	55.39	30+	75.50	90.96	146.35	2
8	Rei Kawamata	1T	2Z	1	2	40.88	55.54	27+	68.00	81.92	137.47	6

== Women ==
=== Qualifications ===
Rank	Name	Bouldering						Lead			Total Points
Rank	Name	Top / Zone		Attempts		BPP	BP	Hold	LPP	LP	Total Points
1	Miho Nonaka	4T	4Z	4	4	99.60	100.00	40+	100.50	83.75	183.75
2	Hana Koike	4T	4Z	11	11	98.90	99.29	40+	100.50	83.75	183.04
3	Futaba Ito	4T	4Z	6	6	99.40	99.79	39	97.50	81.25	181.04
4	Akiyo Noguchi	3T	3Z	3	3	74.70	75.00	TOP	120.00	100.00	175.00
5	Ryu Nakagawa	3T	3Z	6	5	74.40	74.69	39	97.50	81.25	155.94
6	Natsuki Tanii	2T	4Z	4	10	60.00	60.24	44+	110.50	92.08	152.32
7	Saari Watanabe	3T	4Z	4	6	80.00	80.32	31+	78.00	65.00	145.32
8	Mei Kotake	2T	3Z	2	6	54.74	54.96	43+	108.00	90.00	144.96
9	Miku Ishii	3T	3Z	7	6	74.24	74.53	27	67.50	56.25	130.78
10	Mao Nakamura	3T	3Z	7	7	74.23	74.52	24+	60.50	50.41	124.94
11	Mashiro Kuzu	2T	3Z	6	9	54.40	54.61	32+	80.50	67.08	121.70
12	Nanako Kura	2T	3Z	2	3	54.77	54.99	28	70.00	58.33	113.32
13	Mio Nukui	2T	3Z	3	5	54.70	54.92	27+	68.00	56.66	111.58
14	Nao Mori	1T	1Z	1	1	24.89	24.99	35+	88.00	73.33	98.32
14	Mishika Ishii	1T	1Z	1	1	24.89	24.99	35+	88.00	73.33	98.32
16	Risa Ota	0T	1Z	--	5	5.00	5.02	39+	98.00	81.66	86.68
17	Tomona Takao	0T	0Z	--	--	0.00	0.00	39+	98.00	81.66	81.66
18	Moe Takiguchi	0T	0Z	--	--	0.00	0.00	34	85.00	70.83	70.83
19	Ryo Nakajima	0T	3Z	--	11	15.00	15.06	23+	58.00	48.33	63.39

=== Finals ===
Rank	Name	Bouldering						Lead			Total Points	Qual. Rank
Rank	Name	Top / Zone		Attempts		BPP	BP	Hold	LPP	LP	Total Points	Qual. Rank
1st place, gold medalist(s)	Akiyo Noguchi	2T	3Z	4	5	73.60	100.00	36+	90.50	100.00	200.00	4
2nd place, silver medalist(s)	Miho Nonaka	2T	3Z	6	7	73.40	99.72	31+	78.00	86.18	185.91	1
3rd place, bronze medalist(s)	Saari Watanabe	1T	1Z	1	1	33.00	44.83	20	50.00	55.24	100.08	7
4	Natsuki Tanii	0T	1Z	--	2	8.00	10.87	31+	78.00	86.18	97.05	6
5	Ryu Nakagawa	0T	2Z	--	10	15.90	21.60	25+	63.00	69.61	91.21	5
6	Futaba Ito	0T	2Z	--	3	15.97	21.69	23	57.50	63.53	85.23	3
7	Hana Koike	0T	3Z	--	5	24.00	32.60	17+	43.00	47.51	80.12	2
8	Mei Kotake	0T	0Z	--	--	0.00	0.00	23+	58.00	64.08	64.08	8
