= 2015 IFSC Climbing World Youth Championships =

Competition climbing event

2015 IFSC Climbing World Championships
- Location: (Italy) Arco
- Date: 28 August - 6 September 2015

The 2015 IFSC Climbing World Youth Championships (25th), was held in Arco, Italy from 28 August to 6 September 2015. The competition climbing championships consisted of lead, speed, and bouldering events, for the under 20, under 18, and under 16 age categories.

== Medal table ==
* Host nation (Italy)

Rank	Nation	Gold	Silver	Bronze	Total
1	Russia	2	4	5	11
2	United States	2	4	0	6
3	Italy*	2	1	4	7
4	France	2	1	3	6
5	Slovenia	2	1	2	5
6	Japan	1	3	2	6
7	Austria	1	1	1	3
7	Belgium	1	1	1	3
9	Ukraine	1	1	0	2
10	Poland	1	0	0	1
10	Serbia	1	0	0	1
10	South Korea	1	0	0	1
10	Switzerland	1	0	0	1
14	Iran	0	1	0	1
Totals (14 entries)		18	18	18	54

== Medalists ==
=== Male ===
Event	Gold	Silver	Bronze
Junior (Under 20)
Lead	Bernhard Röck; Austria	Jesse Grupper; United States	Keiichiro Korenaga; Japan
Bouldering	Chon Jong-won; South Korea	Nicolas Pelorson; France	Anze Peharc; Slovenia
Speed	Georgy Artamonov; Russia	John Brosler; United States	Maksim Diachkov; Russia
Youth A (Under 18)
Lead	Sascha Lehmann; Switzerland	Stefano Carnati; Italy	Hugo Parmentier; France
Bouldering	Yoshiyuki Ogata; Japan	Kai Harada; Japan	Hugo Parmentier; France
Speed	Kostiantyn Pavlenko; Ukraine	Mehdi Alipour Shenazandifard; Iran	Lev Rudatsky; Russia
Youth B (Under 16)
Lead	Sam Avezou; France	Harold Peeters; Belgium	Pietro Biagini; Italy
Bouldering	Filip Schenk; Italy	Keita Dohi; Japan	Lukas Franckaert; Belgium
Speed	Petr Zemliakov; Russia	Timur Yamaliev; Russia	Leonardo Sandrin; Italy

=== Female ===
Event	Gold	Silver	Bronze
Junior (Under 20)
Lead	Anak Verhoeven; Belgium	Jessica Pilz; Austria	Julia Chanourdie; France
Bouldering	Stasa Gejo; Serbia	Miho Nonaka; Japan	Jessica Pilz; Austria
Speed	Patrycja Chudziak; Poland	Yana Lugovenko; Ukraine	Elena Timofeeva; Russia
Youth A (Under 18)
Lead	Janja Garnbret; Slovenia	Margo Hayes; United States	Aika Tajima; Japan
Bouldering	Janja Garnbret; Slovenia	Margo Hayes; United States	Asja Gollo; Italy
Speed	Elma Fleuret; France	Ekaterina Barashchuk; Russia	Elizaveta Ivanova; Russia
Youth B (Under 16)
Lead	Ashima Shiraishi; United States	Mia Krampl; Slovenia	Laura Rogora; Italy
Bouldering	Ashima Shiraishi; United States	Elena Krasovskaia; Russia	Vita Lukan; Slovenia
Speed	Elisabetta Dalla Brida; Italy	Karina Gareeva; Russia	Elena Krasovskaia; Russia
