= 2016 IFSC Climbing World Youth Championships =

Competition climbing event

2016 IFSC Climbing World Championships
- Location: (China) Guangzhou
- Date: 7 - 13 November 2016

The 2016 IFSC Climbing World Youth Championships (26th), was held in Guangzhou, China from 7 to 13 November 2016. The competition climbing championships consisted of lead, speed, and bouldering events, for the under 20, under 18, and under 16 age categories.

== Medal table ==
* Host nation (China)

| Rank | Nation | Gold | Silver | Bronze | Total |
|---|---|---|---|---|---|
| 1 | Russia | 4 | 3 | 3 | 10 |
| 2 | United States | 4 | 3 | 2 | 9 |
| 3 | Italy | 3 | 1 | 3 | 7 |
| 4 | Slovenia | 2 | 2 | 1 | 5 |
| 5 | Japan | 1 | 3 | 5 | 9 |
| 6 | France | 1 | 2 | 0 | 3 |
| 7 | Belgium | 1 | 0 | 0 | 1 |
| 7 | Croatia | 1 | 0 | 0 | 1 |
| 7 | Luxembourg | 1 | 0 | 0 | 1 |
| 10 | Austria | 0 | 1 | 1 | 2 |
| 10 | Great Britain | 0 | 1 | 1 | 2 |
| 10 | Switzerland | 0 | 1 | 1 | 2 |
| 13 | Poland | 0 | 1 | 0 | 1 |
| 14 | Kazakhstan | 0 | 0 | 1 | 1 |
| Totals (14 entries) | | 18 | 18 | 18 | 54 |

== Medalists ==
=== Male ===
| Event | Gold | Silver | Bronze |
Junior (Under 20)
| Lead | Simon Lorenzi; Belgium | Yuki Hada; Japan | Dimitri Vogt; Switzerland |
| Bouldering | Borna Cujic; Croatia | Baptiste Ometz; Switzerland | William Bosi; Great Britain |
| Speed | Ludovico Fossali; Italy | Pierre Rebreyend; France | Aleksandr Shikov; Russia |
Youth A (Under 18)
| Lead | Giorgio Bendazzoli; Italy | Kai Lightner; United States | Taito Nakagami; Japan |
| Bouldering | Keita Dohi; Japan | Kai Lightner; United States | Kai Harada; Japan |
| Speed | Gian Luca Zodda; Italy | Sergei Rukin; Russia | Georgii Morozov; Russia |
Youth B (Under 16)
| Lead | Sam Avezou; France | Katsura Konishi; Japan | Hidemasa Nishida; Japan |
| Bouldering | Nathan Martin; Luxembourg | Davide Marco Colombo; Italy | Katsura Konishi; Japan |
| Speed | Almaz Nagaev; Russia | Roman Bozhko; Russia | Danil Ogorodnikov; Russia |

=== Female ===
| Event | Gold | Silver | Bronze |
Junior (Under 20)
| Lead | Margo Hayes; United States | Hannah Schubert; Austria | Aika Tajima; Japan |
| Bouldering | Margo Hayes; United States | Tara Hayes; Great Britain | Franziska Sterrer; Austria |
| Speed | Daria Kan; Russia | Patrycja Chudziak; Poland | Assel Marlenova; Kazakhstan |
Youth A (Under 18)
| Lead | Janja Garnbret; Slovenia | Mia Krampl; Slovenia | Vita Lukan; Slovenia |
| Bouldering | Janja Garnbret; Slovenia | Vita Lukan; Slovenia | Maya Madere; United States |
| Speed | Elizaveta Ivanova; Russia | Elma Fleuret; France | Elisabetta Dalla Brida; Italy |
Youth B (Under 16)
| Lead | Ashima Shiraishi; United States | Brooke Raboutou; United States | Laura Rogora; Italy |
| Bouldering | Ashima Shiraishi; United States | Futaba Ito; Japan | Brooke Raboutou; United States |
| Speed | Karina Gareeva; Russia | Daria Kuznetsova; Russia | Giorgia Strazieri; Italy |
