= Mia Krampl =

Slovene rock climber (born 2000)

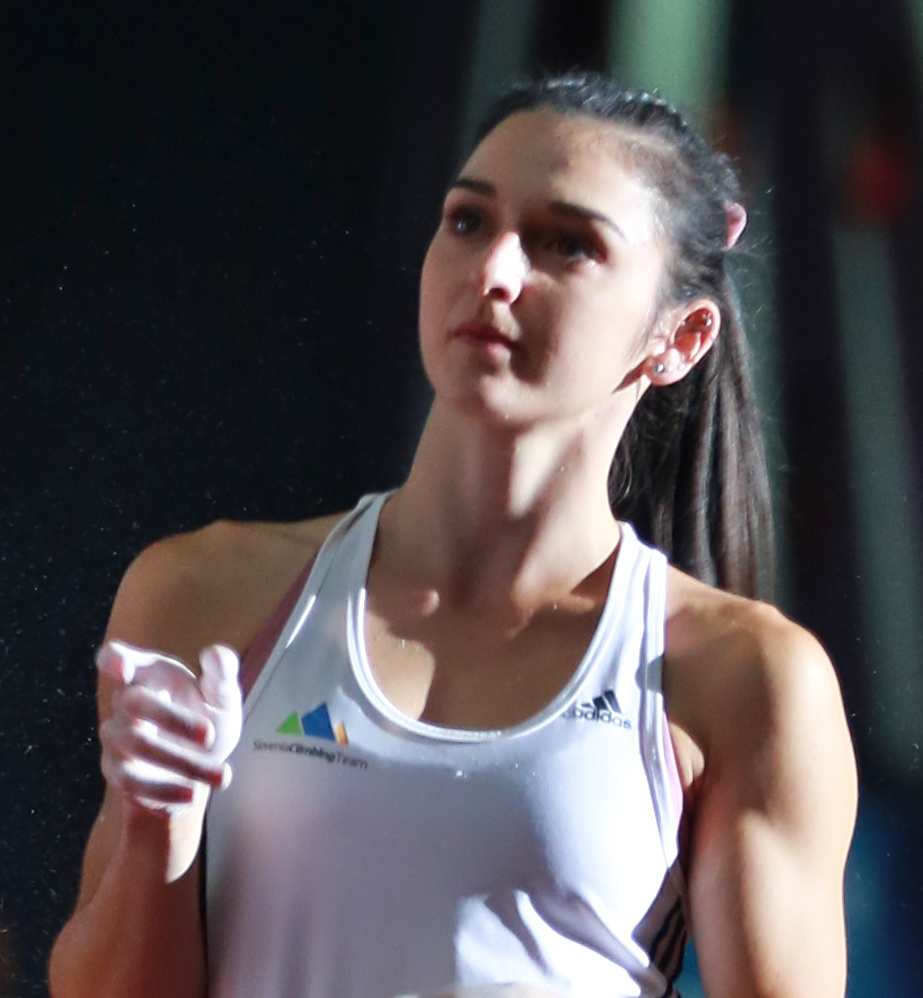

Personal information
- Born: July 21, 2000 (age 26) Kranj, Slovenia
- Height: 162 cm (5 ft 4 in)

Climbing career
- Type of climber: Competition climbing; Sport climbing; Bouldering
- Highest grade: Redpoint: 8b+ (5.14a); Onsight/Flash: 8a (5.13b); Bouldering: 8A+ (V12)
Medal record
Women's competition climbing
Representing Slovenia
World Championships
| Silver medal – second place | 2019 Hachiōji | Lead |
| Silver medal – second place | 2021 Moscow | Combined |
World Cup
| Bronze medal – third place | Jakarta 2022 | Lead |
| Bronze medal – third place | Munich 2019 | Bouldering |

Mia Krampl (born 21 July 2000) is a Slovenian rock climber who specialises in competition climbing. In 2019, she finished second in lead at the IFSC Climbing World Championships and qualified to compete at the 2020 Summer Olympic Games by finishing third at the IFSC Combined Qualifier in Toulouse. Krampl also has a pair of podium finishes at the IFSC World Youth Championships, as well as two gold and one bronze medal at the European Youth Championships.

Krampl started climbing at the age of six, as her brother was also a competition climber.

At the 2019 Boulder World Cup in Munich, Krampl battled through a painful knee injury in her first World Cup final to secure the bronze medal, impressively topping the fourth problem using a dramatic figure-four move and earning strong crowd support for her gritty performance.

== Competition climbing ==
=== IFSC Olympic Qualification ===
| Discipline | Toulouse 2019 | Shanghai 2024 | Budapest 2024 |
|---|---|---|---|
| Combined | 3 | - | - |
| Boulder & Lead | - | 12 | 7 |

=== World Championships ===
| Discipline | Innsbruck 2018 | Hachioji 2019 | Moscow 2021 | Bern 2023 | Seoul 2025 |
|---|---|---|---|---|---|
| Lead | 7 | 2 | 19 | 4 | 17 |
| Boulder | 33 | 17 | 29 | 31 | - |
| Combined | 18 | 14 | 2 | - | - |
| Boulder & Lead | - | - | - | 14 | - |

=== European Championships ===
| Discipline | Edinburgh 2019 | Munich 2022 |
|---|---|---|
| Boulder | - | 21 |
| Lead | 11 | 4 |
| Boulder & Lead | - | 2 |

=== Youth World Championships ===
| Discipline | 2015 Youth B | 2016 Youth A |
|---|---|---|
| Boulder | 23 | 15 |
| Lead | 2 | 2 |

=== European Youth Championships ===
| Discipline | 2015 Youth B | 2016 Youth A | 2017 Youth A | 2018 Juniors |
|---|---|---|---|---|
| Boulder | 7 | - | - | 1 |
| Lead | 1 | 3 | 5 | - |
