= 2017 IFSC Climbing World Youth Championships =

Competition climbing event

2017 IFSC Climbing World Championships
- Location: (Austria) Innsbruck
- Date: 30 August - 10 September 2017

The 2017 IFSC Climbing World Youth Championships (27th), was held in Innsbruck, Austria from 30 August to 10 September 2017. The competition climbing championships consisted of lead, speed, and bouldering events, for the under 20, under 18, and under 16 age categories.

== Medal table ==
* Host nation (Austria)

Rank	Nation	Gold	Silver	Bronze	Total
1	Japan	6	6	5	17
2	United States	5	2	3	10
3	Russia	3	6	4	13
4	Italy	2	0	0	2
5	Ecuador	1	0	0	1
5	Poland	1	0	0	1
7	China	0	1	1	2
7	Spain	0	1	1	2
9	Luxembourg	0	1	0	1
9	South Korea	0	1	0	1
11	Austria*	0	0	1	1
11	Belgium	0	0	1	1
11	France	0	0	1	1
11	Germany	0	0	1	1
Totals (14 entries)		18	18	18	54

== Medalists ==
=== Male ===
Event	Gold	Silver	Bronze
Junior (Under 20)
Lead	Yoshiyuki Ogata; Japan	Meichi Narasaki; Japan	Kai Lightner; United States
Bouldering	Yoshiyuki Ogata; Japan	Meichi Narasaki; Japan	Jan-Luca Posch; Austria
Speed	Carlos Felipe Granja Lopez; Ecuador	Lee Seungbeom; South Korea	Michael Finn-Henry; United States
Youth A (Under 18)
Lead	Shuta Tanaka; Japan	Nathan Martin; Luxembourg	Mikel Asier Linacisoro Molina; Spain
Bouldering	Filip Schenk; Italy	Keita Dohi; Japan	Mizuki Tajima; Japan
Speed	Sergei Rukin; Russia	Georgii Morozov; Russia	Li Jinxin; China
Youth B (Under 16)
Lead	Colin Duffy; United States	Alberto Ginés López; Spain	Hidemasa Nishida; Japan
Bouldering	Rei Kawamata; Japan	Semen Ovchinnikov; Russia	Ryoei Nukui; Japan
Speed	Jacopo Stefani; Italy	Anton Kulba; Russia	Evgeny Kuzin; Russia

=== Female ===
Event	Gold	Silver	Bronze
Junior (Under 20)
Lead	Claire Buhrfeind; United States	Aika Tajima; Japan	Heloïse Doumont; Belgium
Bouldering	Claire Buhrfeind; United States	Maya Madere; United States	Johanna Holfeld; Germany
Speed	Daria Kan; Russia	Elizaveta Ivanova; Russia	Ekaterina Barashchuk; Russia
Youth A (Under 18)
Lead	Ashima Shiraishi; United States	Brooke Raboutou; United States	Nolwenn Arc; France
Bouldering	Ashima Shiraishi; United States	Luiza Emeleva; Russia	Brooke Raboutou; United States
Speed	Aleksandra Kałucka; Poland	Song Yiling; China	Polina Aksenova; Russia
Youth B (Under 16)
Lead	Ai Mori; Japan	Natsuki Tanii; Japan	Futaba Ito; Japan
Bouldering	Futaba Ito; Japan	Natsuki Tanii; Japan	Saki Kikuchi; Japan
Speed	Polina Kulagina; Russia	Daria Potapova; Russia	Kamilla Kushaeva; Russia
