= Ryo Omasa =

Japanese competition climber (born 2002)

Personal information
- Nationality: Japanese
- Born: June 26, 2002 (age 24) Ehime, Japan
- Education: Matsuyama University
- Height: 167 cm (5 ft 6 in)

Climbing career
- Type of climber: Competition speed climbing
Medal record
Men's competition climbing
Representing Japan
World Series (Overall)
| Second place | 2026 | Speed |
| Third place | 2025 | Speed |
World Series (Event)
| Gold medal – first place | Chongqing 2026 | Speed |
| Silver medal – second place | Guiyang 2025 | Speed |
| Silver medal – second place | Bali 2025 | Speed |
| Bronze medal – third place | Chamonix 2026 | Speed |
| Bronze medal – third place | Kraków 2025 | Speed |
| Bronze medal – third place | Wujiang 2023 | Speed |
| Bronze medal – third place | Villars 2023 | Speed |

Ryo Omasa (大政 涼 Omasa Ryo; born June 26, 2002) is a Japanese competition climber who specializes in competition speed climbing.

== Career ==
Omasa collected his first IFSC World Cup medal, winning bronze at the 2023 Villars World Cup. In September 2023, he won another bronze medal at the Wujiang World Cup.

In 2025, Omasa won his first silver medal at the Bali World Cup and a bronze medal at the Kraków World Cup.

In 2026, Omasa won this fourth bronze medal in Chamonix, after beating Zhao Yicheng in the semifinal with a PB of 4.701. Omasa won his first World Climbing Series in Chongqing, becoming the first Japanese climber to win in the Speed event.

== Achievements ==
=== Asian Youth Championships ===
Lead Youth A

| Year | Venue | Result |
|---|---|---|
| 2018 | Chongqing, China | (bronze) Bronze |

=== IFSC Climbing World Cup ===
Men's speed

| Year | Venue | Opponent | Time (s) | Result |
|---|---|---|---|---|
| 2026 | Chamonix, France | (China) Zhao Yicheng | 4.701–4.704 | (bronze) Bronze |
| 2025 | Guiyang, China | (China) Chu Shouhong | 4.79–4.99 | (silver) Silver |
| 2025 | Bali, Indonesia | (United States) Samuel Watson | fs–4.64 | (silver) Silver |
| 2025 | Kraków, Poland | (United States) Zach Hammer | 5.49-fall | (bronze) Bronze |
| 2023 | Wujiang, China | (South Korea) Euncheol Shin | 5.11-5.16 | (bronze) Bronze |
| 2023 | Villars, Switzerland | (United States) Samuel Watson | 5.30-fall | (bronze) Bronze |

== Rankings ==
=== World Cup ===
| Discipline | 2022 | 2023 | 2024 | 2025 |
|---|---|---|---|---|
| Speed | 26 | 10 | 10 | 3 |

=== Japan Cup ===
| Discipline | 2019 | 2020 | 2021 | 2022 | 2023 | 2024 | 2025 |
|---|---|---|---|---|---|---|---|
| Speed | 20 | 9 | 11 | 1 | 5 | 9 | 2 |
