= Keita Dohi =

Japanese competition climber

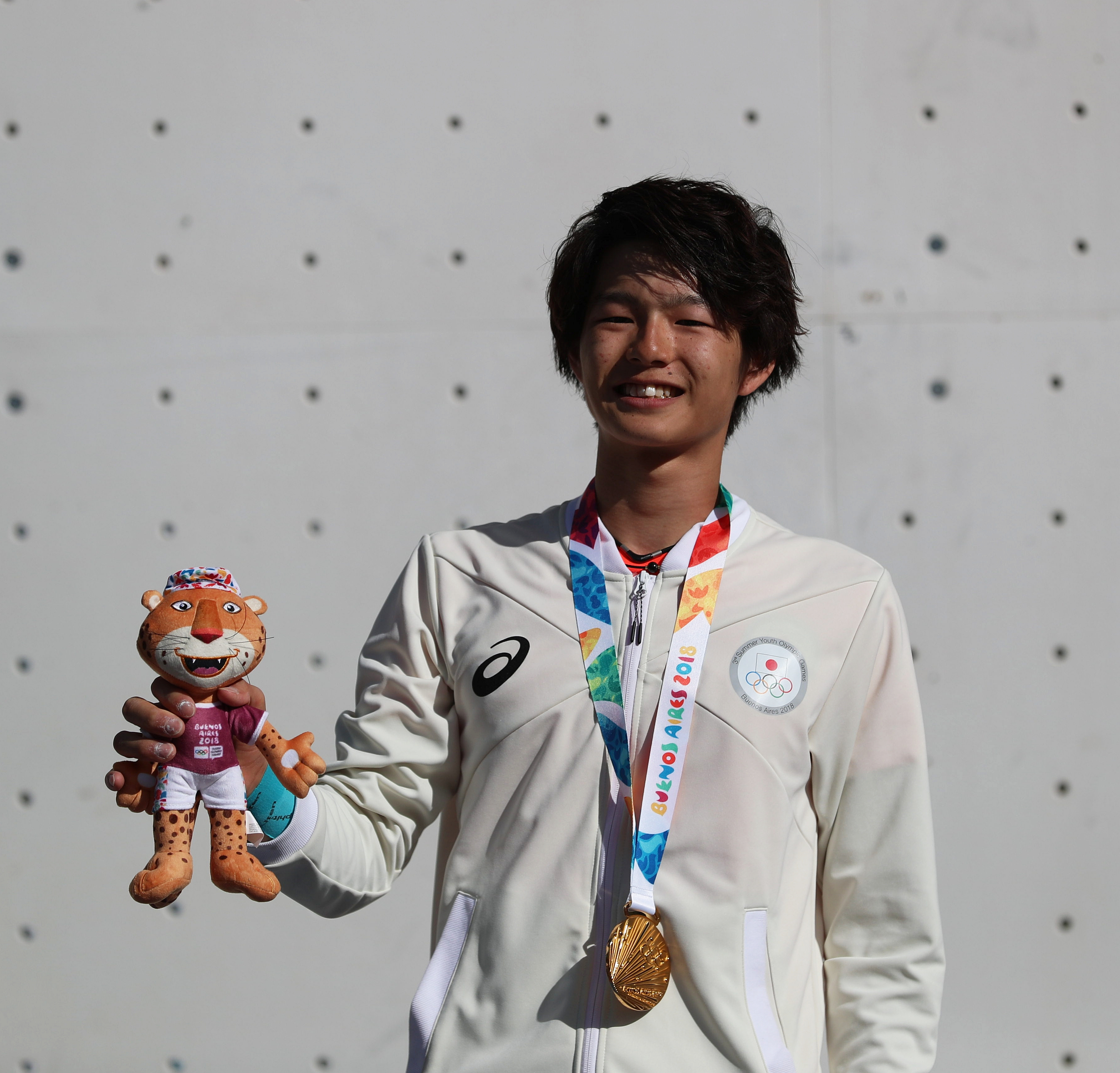
- Dohi at the 2018 Youth Olympic Games

Personal information
- Nationality: Japanese
- Born: October 17, 2000 (age 26) Hiratsuka, Kanagawa, Japan
- Height: 171 cm (5 ft 7 in)

Climbing career
- Type of climber: Competition climbing; Bouldering
- Highest grade: Bouldering: V14 (8B+)
Medal record
Men's competition climbing
Representing Japan
Asian Championships
Bronze medal – third place	Meishan 2026	Bouldering
Asian Cup
Silver medal – second place	Hong Kong 2025	Bouldering
Youth Olympic Games
Gold medal – first place	Buenos Aires 2018	Combined

Keita Dohi (土肥 圭太 Dohi Keita; born October 17, 2000) is a Japanese competition climber who specializes in competition bouldering.

== Youth competitions ==
Dohi began competing in international youth competitions in 2015, earning silver in the Youth B bouldering category at the 2015 Youth World Championships held in Arco.

He continued to have success in the youth competition climbing scene, earning the boulder gold and silver in the Youth A category at the 2016 and 2017 Youth World Championships respectively.

Dohi won the Youth A boulder title at the 2017 Asian Youth Championship held in Singapore. In 2018, Dohi became Sport Climbing's first Youth Olympics champion at the Youth Olympic Games in Buenos Aires.

== Competition climbing ==
Dohi began competing in senior competitions in 2018. He notably placed fourth at the 2019 Boulder World Cup in Wujiang. At the 2019 World Championships in Hachioji, he placed fifth in bouldering at his first senior World Championships.

In 2022, Dohi placed sixth at the 2022 Boulder World Cup in Seoul.

In 2025, he secured a silver medal in bouldering at the Asian Cup held in Hong Kong.

== Rankings ==
=== IFSC Climbing World Cup ===
Discipline	2018	2019	2022	2026
Bouldering	42	19	14	16

=== Japan Cup ===
Discipline	2015	2016	2017	2018	2019	2020	2021	2022	2023	2024	2025	2026
Bouldering	-	63	51	27	3	9	18	2	28	41	8	4

== Climbing World Championships ==
Youth

Discipline	2015 Youth B	2016 Youth A	2017 Youth A
Bouldering	2	1	2
Lead	16	-	9
Combined	-	-	5

Senior

Discipline	Hachioji 2019
Bouldering	5
Lead	29
Speed	39
Combined	15

== Notable ascents ==
=== Boulder problems ===
8B+ (V14):

- Power of Now - Magic Wood (SUI) - November 2026.
- Off the Wagon - Val Bavona (SUI) - October 2025.

8B (V13):

- Bansosha - Ogawayama (JPN) - March 2022.
