= Tomoa Narasaki =

Japanese rock climber (born 1996)

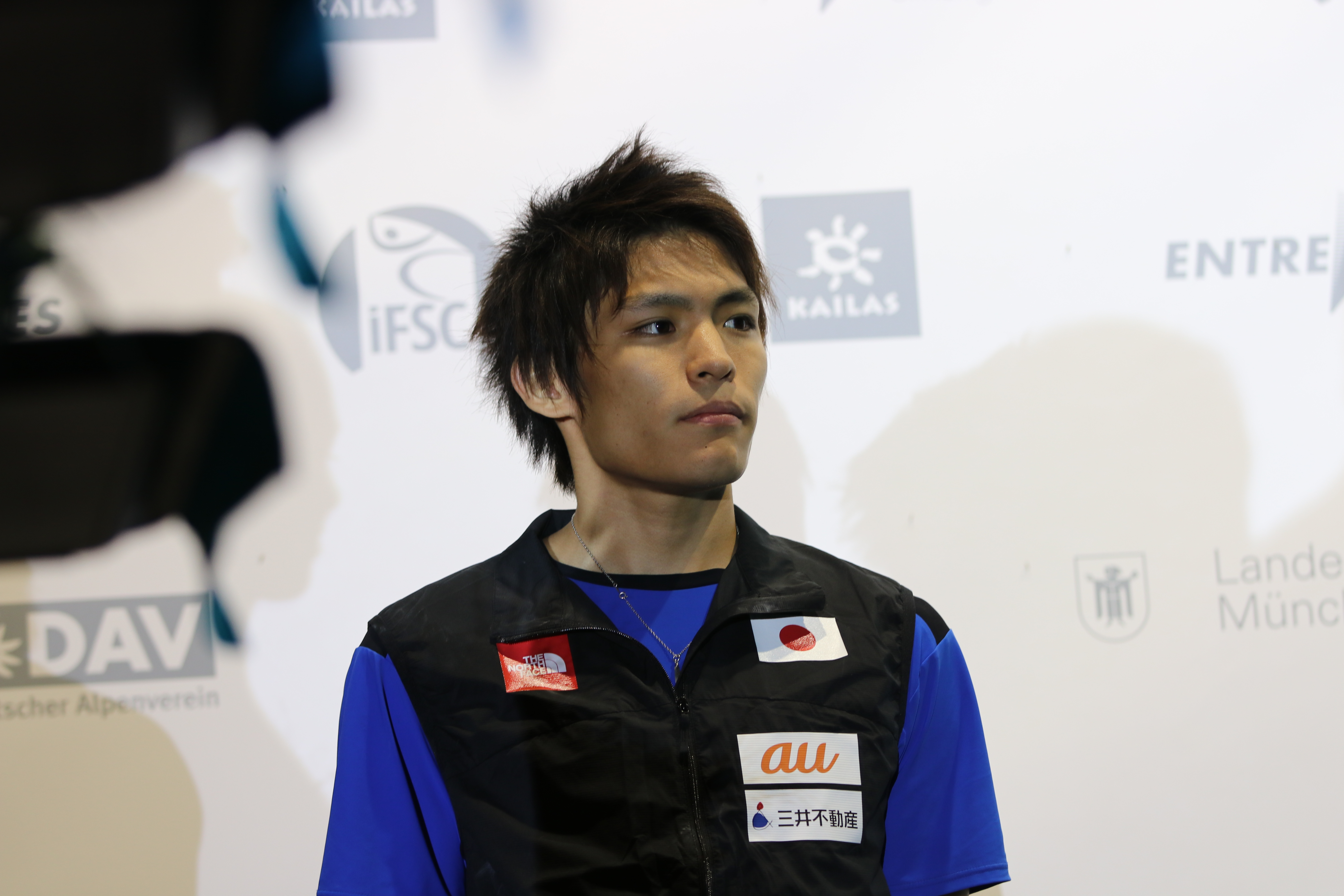
- Tomoa Narasaki in Munich, 2017

Personal information
- Nationality: Japanese
- Born: June 22, 1996 (age 30) Utsunomiya, Japan
- Occupations: Professional sport climber and boulderer
- Height: 169 cm (5 ft 7 in)
- Weight: 58 kg (128 lb)
- Spouse: Akiyo Noguchi (m. 2021)

Climbing career
- Type of climber: Competition bouldering; Bouldering
- Ape index: +10 cm (4 in)
- Highest grade: Bouldering: V15 (8C)
- Known for: IFSC World Cup and World Championship winner; 2-time Olympian
Medal record
Men's competition climbing
Representing Japan
World Championships
Gold medal – first place	2016 Paris	Bouldering
Gold medal – first place	2019 Hachiōji	Bouldering
Gold medal – first place	2019 Hachiōji	Combined
Silver medal – second place	2021 Moscow	Bouldering
Bronze medal – third place	2023 Bern	Combined
World Cup (Overall)
Winner	2016	Bouldering
Second place	2017	Bouldering
Winner	2017	Combined
Second place	2018	Bouldering
Second place	2018	Combined
Winner	2019	Bouldering
Second place	2022	Bouldering
Third place	2023	Bouldering
Third place	2024	Bouldering
Asian Championships
Gold medal – first place	2022	Bouldering
Gold medal – first place	2022	Lead
Gold medal – first place	2022	Combined
Silver medal – second place	2016	Bouldering
Silver medal – second place	2026	Bouldering
Bronze medal – third place	2024	Bouldering
Asian Games
Bronze medal – third place	2018 Jakarta-Palembang	Combined
Bronze medal – third place	2026 Aichi-Nagoya	Boulder
- Updated on June 20, 2025

Tomoa Narasaki (楢﨑 智亜, Narasaki Tomoa; born June 22, 1996) is a Japanese professional rock climber who specializes in bouldering and competition bouldering.

== Early life ==
Narasaki started climbing at age 10, together with Sachi Amma, in Sachi's family climbing gym. Previously, he had been training apparatus gymnastics.

== Climbing career ==
=== Competition climbing ===
Narasaki won the IFSC World Championships in bouldering in 2016 and 2019, and was also the overall winner of the IFSC Climbing World Cup for bouldering in 2016 and 2019.

Narasaki formerly held the Japanese record for competition speed climbing with a time of 5.73 seconds, which he secured in March 2021 at the Climbing Japan Cup speed competition. He devised the "Tomoa skip", a speed climbing technique to bypass one of the lower holds on the speed climbing wall. The Tomoa skip is now implemented by nearly all competitive speed climbers.

In 2019, Narasaki qualified for the 2020 Summer Olympics in Tokyo by winning the combined bouldering and lead climbing event at the 2019 IFSC Climbing World Championships. He went on to place fourth in the combined event at the Olympics.

In 2023, Narasaki qualified for the 2024 Summer Olympics in Paris by placing third in the combined event at the 2023 IFSC Climbing World Championships. At the Olympics, he finished in tenth place in the semifinals of the combined event and did not move on to finals.

=== Bouldering ===
On December 1, 2019, Narasaki became the sixth climber to flash a V14 (8B+) grade boulder after sending Decided in Mizugaki, Japan, on his first attempt. In 2021, Narasaki sent Asagimadara V15 (8C) on his third attempt. In December 2023, he flashed Gakidō, originally graded V16 (8C+), although Narasaki gave the boulder a grade of V14 after his send. Narasaki subsequently made the first ascent of the sit start to the climb, which he named Ashuradō and graded V15.

== Personal life ==
On December 25, 2021, Narasaki and fellow Japanese climber Akiyo Noguchi announced their marriage on their respective social media pages. On May 23, 2023, Akiyo gave birth to their first child, Keiyo.

Narasaki's younger brother, Meichi Narasaki, is also a professional climber.

== Rankings ==
=== IFSC Climbing World Cup ===
Discipline	2013	2014	2015	2016	2017	2018	2019	2021	2022	2023	2024	2025	2026
Lead	52	-	-	-	15	16	20	32	-	-	-	-	-
Bouldering	-	26	30	1	2	2	1	6	2	3	3	7	11
Speed	-	-	-	-	84	52	44	59	-	-	-	-	-
Combined	-	-	-	-	1	2	1	-	-	-	-	-	-

=== IFSC Climbing World Championships ===
Discipline	2014	2016	2018	2019	2021	2023	2025
Lead	-	-	13	4	5	12	-
Bouldering	10	1	7	1	2	13	4
Speed	-	-	21	22	-	-	-
Combined	-	-	5	1	-	3	-

=== Japan Cup ===
Discipline	2012	2013	2014	2015	2016	2017	2018	2019	2020	2021	2022	2023	2024	2025	2026
Lead	7	12	-	-	-	-	2	2	4	-	51	14	14	9	-
Bouldering	-	27	7	3	15	8	3	2	2	2	1	3	2	5	2
Speed	-	-	-	-	-	-	-	4	2	1	-	-	-	-	-
Combined	-	-	-	-	-	-	1	1	-	1	-	10	-	-	-

== World Cup podiums ==
=== Lead ===
Season	Gold	Silver	Bronze	Total
2017		2		2
2018			1	1
2019			1	1
Total	0	2	2	4

=== Bouldering ===
Season	Gold	Silver	Bronze	Total
2016	2	3		5
2017		4		4
2018	1	2	1	4
2019	1	3		4
2021		1	1	2
2022	1	1	1	2
2023	1	1		2
2024	1			1
2025			1	1
Total	7	15	4	26

=== Bouldering & Lead ===
Season	Gold	Silver	Bronze	Total
2022	1			1
Total	1	0	0	1

== Olympic results ==
Tokyo 2020	Paris 2024
Men's Combined	Men's Boulder & Lead
#4	#10

== See also ==
- List of grade milestones in rock climbing
- History of rock climbing
- Rankings of most career IFSC gold medals
