= Akiyo Noguchi =

Japanese climber (born 1989)

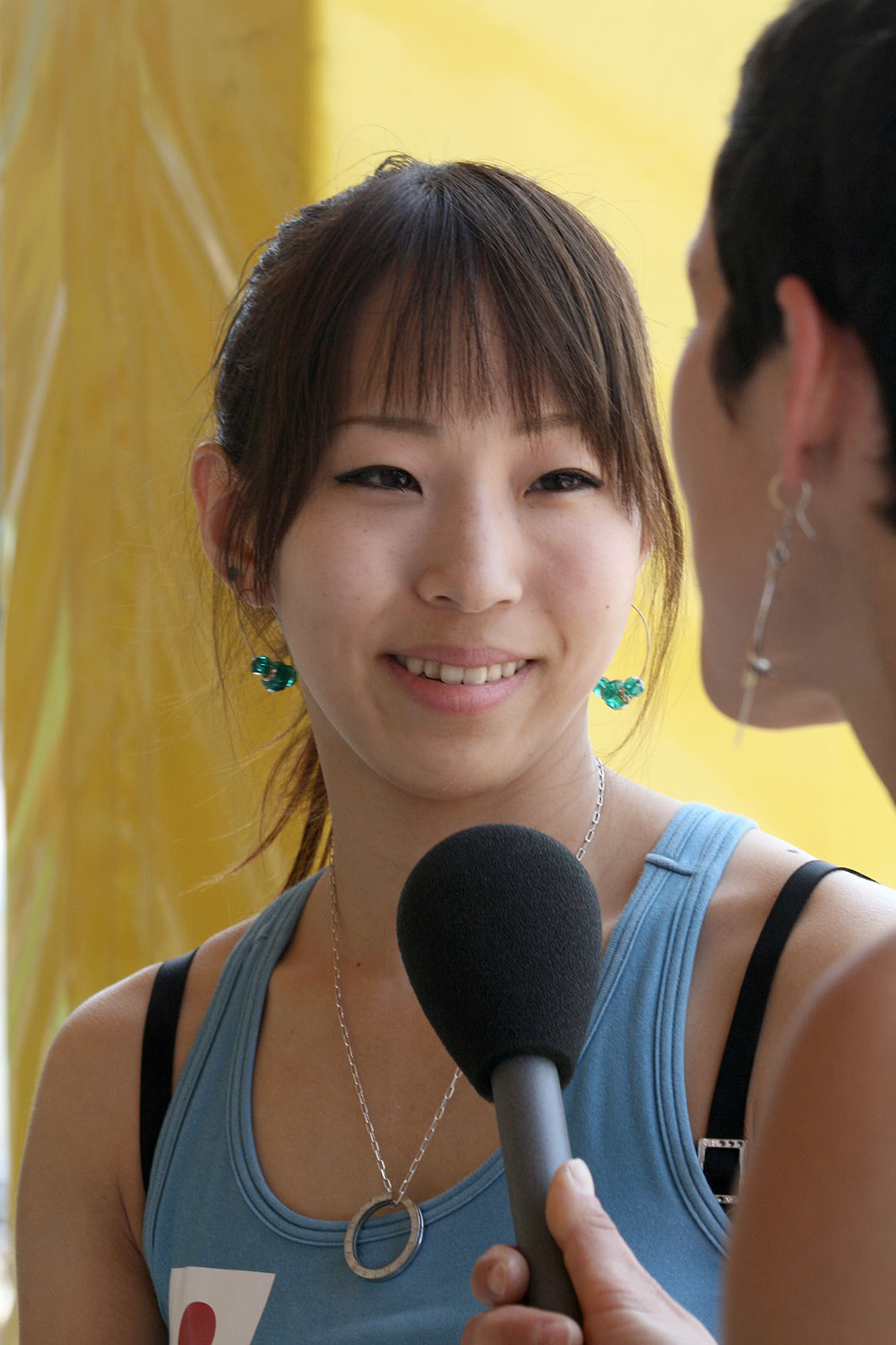
- Noguchi at the World Cup in Vienna, 2010.

Personal information
- Nationality: Japanese
- Born: May 30, 1989 (age 37) Ryūgasaki, Ibaraki Prefecture, Japan
- Occupation: Professional rock climber
- Height: 167 cm (5 ft 6 in)
- Weight: 49 kg (108 lb)
- Spouse: Tomoa Narasaki (m. 2021)

Climbing career
- Type of climber: Competition climbing; Bouldering; Sport climbing
- Highest grade: Redpoint: 8c+ (5.14c); Bouldering: 8B+ (V14)
- Retired from competition: 2021
- Known for: Winning the IFSC bouldering World Cup 4 times
Medal record
Women's competition climbing
Representing Japan
Event / 1st / 2nd / 3rd; World Cup / 21 / 24 / 23
Olympic Games
Bronze medal – third place	2020 Tokyo	Combined
World Championships
Silver medal – second place	2007 Avilés	Bouldering
Silver medal – second place	2018 Innsbruck	Bouldering
Silver medal – second place	2019 Hachiōji	Bouldering
Silver medal – second place	2019 Hachiōji	Combined
Bronze medal – third place	2005 Munich	Lead
Bronze medal – third place	2014 Munich	Bouldering
Bronze medal – third place	2016 Paris	Bouldering
World Cup (Season)
Second place	2008	Bouldering
Winner	2008	Combined
Winner	2009	Bouldering
Winner	2009	Combined
Winner	2010	Bouldering
Second place	2011	Bouldering
Second place	2012	Bouldering
Second place	2013	Bouldering
Winner	2014	Bouldering
Winner	2014	Combined
Winner	2015	Bouldering
Second place	2015	Combined
Second place	2016	Combined
Third place	2017	Bouldering
Second place	2018	Bouldering
Second place	2018	Combined
Second place	2019	Bouldering
Second place	2019	Combined
Asian Games
Gold medal – first place	2018	Combined
- Updated on April 28, 2019

Akiyo Noguchi (野口 啓代, Noguchi Akiyo; born May 30, 1989) is a Japanese professional rock climber who specializes in competition bouldering as well as outdoor bouldering and sport climbing.

She participates in both competition bouldering and competition lead climbing disciplines. She is known for winning the IFSC Climbing World Cup in Bouldering four times. In her home country, she won Bouldering Japan Cup nine times consecutively from 2005 to 2014, which no other Japanese athlete has been able to match. She retired from competition climbing after competing and winning a bronze medal in the 2020 Summer Olympics.

== Early life ==
Noguchi grew up on a cattle farm in the Ibaraki Prefecture. From a young age she would climb on buildings, trees and sometimes even on the cows. In 2000, when she was 11 years old, she tried a real climbing wall for the first time, during a holiday trip to Guam. Back at home she immediately joined a local climbing gym. Her father later built her a climbing wall in an old cattle barn on the farm.

== Competition climbing ==
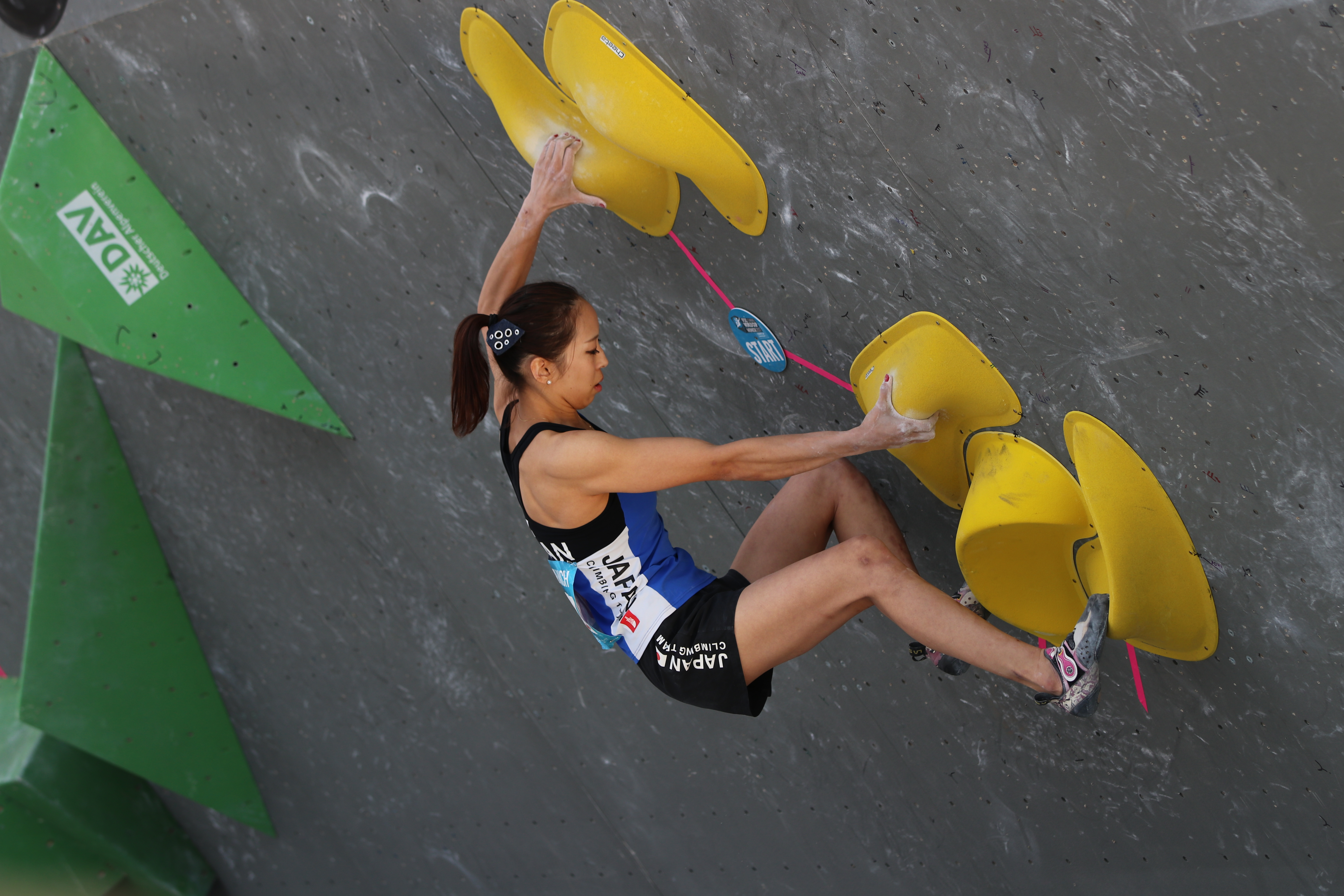
Noguchi bouldering in 2017

In 2007, she started competing in the Bouldering World Cups, reaching the podium three times. In 2009, she won the World Cup in bouldering, over the previous year's champion Anna Stöhr. Noguchi repeated as champion in 2010, 2014 and 2015. In the 2011, 2012 and 2013 bouldering events at the World Cup she placed second. She has also won the combined climbing title at the World Cup three times.

Noguchi was also awarded the La Sportiva Competition Award in 2010, "for her victories and the positive spirit she exudes during competitions".

In 2019 Akiyo Noguchi won a silver medal in the combined competition at the climbing World Championship which qualified her for the 2020 Summer Olympics. Noguchi had contemplated retirement from competition climbing as early as 2016, but when it was announced that climbing would become an Olympic sport in 2020 for the first time she decided to try and qualify for Olympics in her home country. Noguchi attended her final IFSC Climbing World Cup in Innsbruck in June 2021, finishing a career of 169 World Cups and World Championships and 75 podium places. On July 13, 2021, she published an autobiography.

She finished her climbing career with a bronze medal at the 2020 Summer Olympics.

== Rock climbing ==
=== Redpointed routes ===
8c+ (5.14c):

- Mind Control - Oliana (SPN) - December 10, 2013

8b (5.13d):

- Liquid Finger - Joyama (JPN) - December 12, 2008

=== Boulder problems ===
8B+ (V14):

- The Globalist - Sipoo (FIN) - October 2025.

8A+ (V12):

- Aguni - Mizugaki (JPN) - November 2014.
- The Mandala - The Buttermilks (CAL) - 2015.
- A Maze of Death - The Buttermilks (CAL) - 2016.
- Euro Trash - Little Cottonwood Canyon (UT) - May 2022.

8A (V11):

- Monsterman SD - Jyougasaki (JPN) - February 2010.
- Evilution Direct - The Buttermilks (CAL) - 2016.

== Personal life ==
On December 25, 2021, Noguchi and fellow Japanese sport climber Tomoa Narasaki announced their marriage on their respective social media pages. In 2023, Akiyo gave birth to their first child, Keiyo.

== Rankings ==
=== World Cup ===
	2005	2006	2007	2008	2009	2010	2011	2012	2013	2014	2015	2016	2017	2018	2019	2021
Lead	42	21	24	5	11	8	20	13	7	10	30	17	15	8	9	22
Bouldering	-	-	6	2	1	1	2	2	2	1	1	4	3	2	2	9
Combined	-	-	5	1	1	2	3	3	2	1	2	2	6	2	2	-

=== World Championships ===
	2005	2007	2009	2011	2012	2014	2016	2018	2019
Lead	3	11	8	-	-	9	-	8	5
Bouldering	21	2	5	5	6	3	3	2	2
Speed	-	-	31	-	-	-	-	47	34
Combined	-	-	-	-	-	-	-	4	2

== World Cup podiums ==
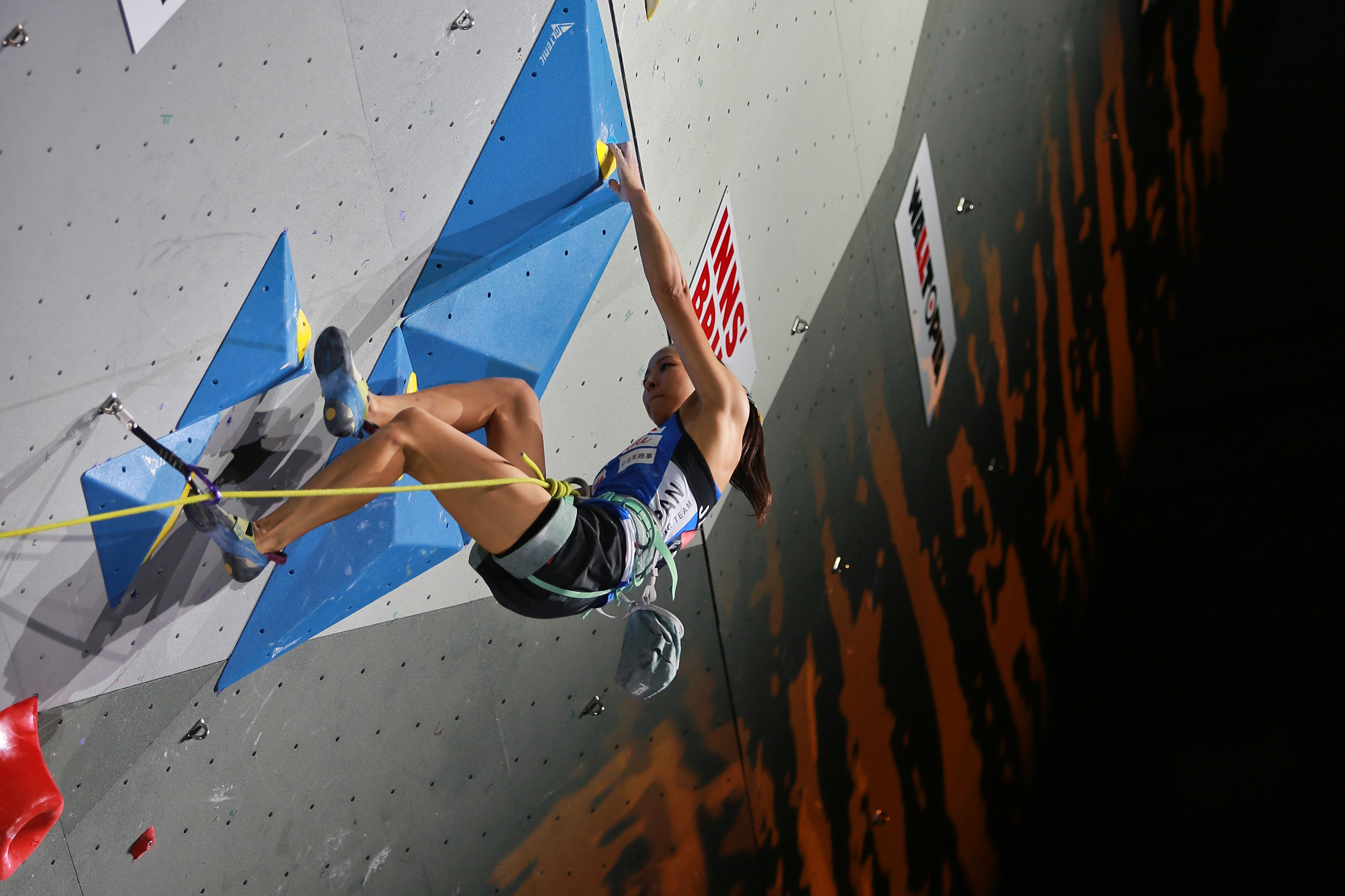
Noguchi lead climbing at the Climbing World Championships 2018

=== Lead ===
Season	Gold	Silver	Bronze	Total
2008			1	1
2009		1		1
2010			2	2
2011				0
2012				0
2013		1		1
2014			1	1
2015				0
2016		1		1
2017				0
2018			1	1
2019		1		1
2021			1	1
Total	0	4	6	10

=== Bouldering ===
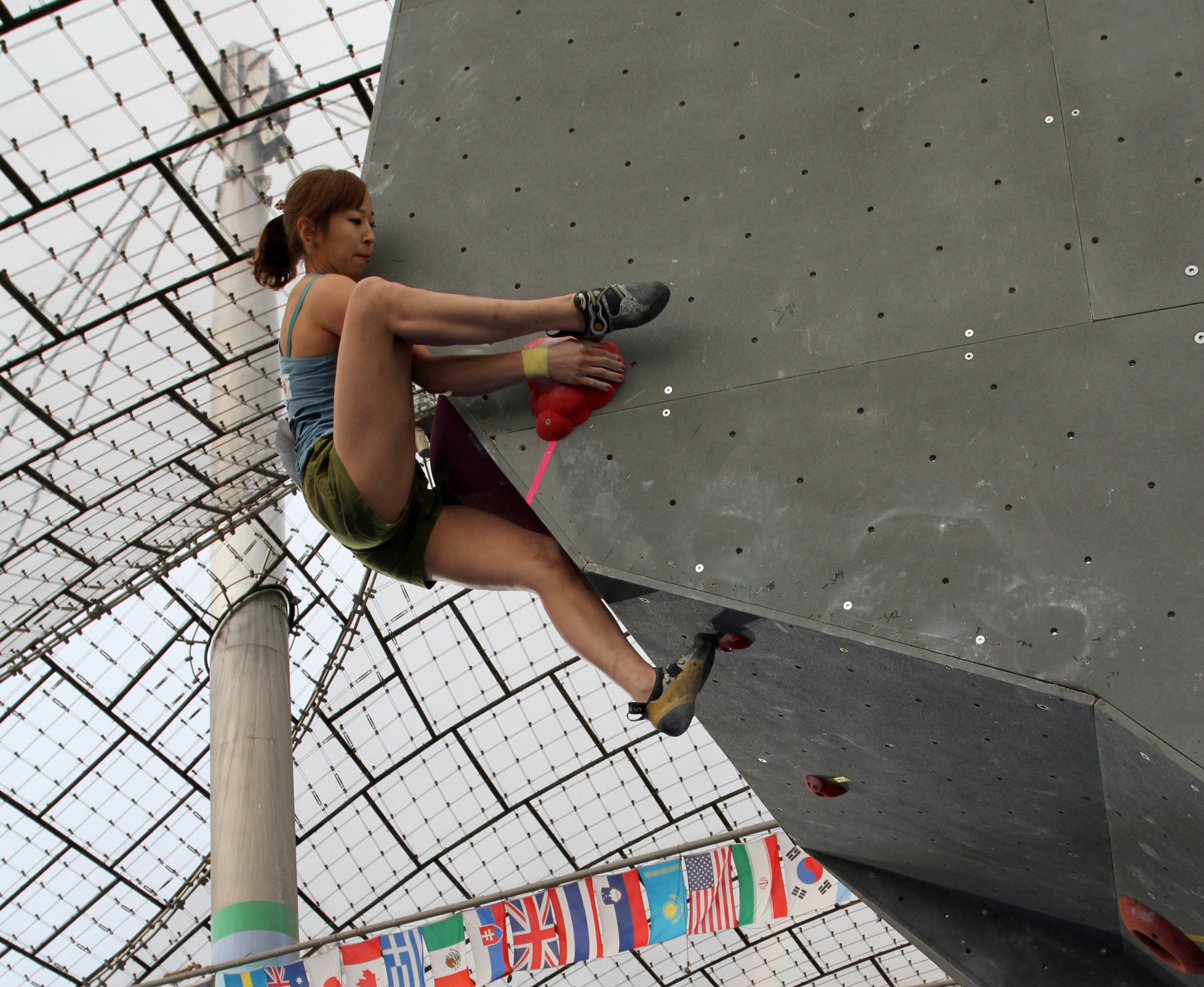
Noguchi at the World Cup in Munich, 2012.

Season	Gold	Silver	Bronze	Total
2007		2	1	3
2008	1	1	1	3
2009	3	1	1	5
2010	2	1	1	4
2011	4	1		5
2012	3			3
2013		3	2	5
2014	4	1	2	7
2015	1	3		4
2016		1	2	3
2017		2	3	5
2018	3		4	7
2019		4		4
Total	21	20	17	58

== See also ==
- Akiyo Noguchi in the Climbing World Cup
- IFSC Climbing World Cup
- IFSC Climbing World Championships
- IFSC Climbing Asian Championships
