= Kokoro Fujii =

Japanese rock climber

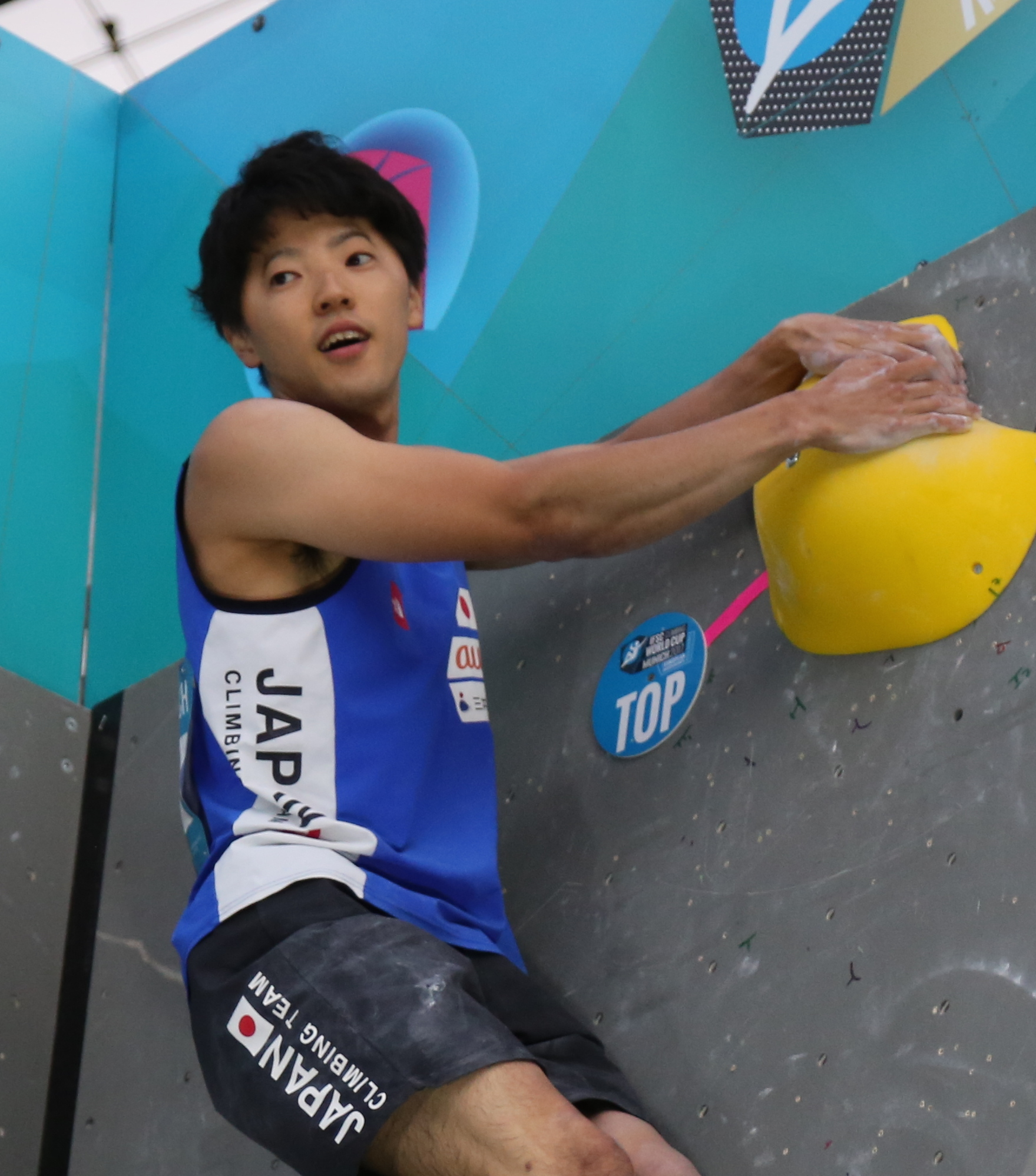
- Kokoro Fujii in Munich, 2017

Personal information
- Nationality: Japanese
- Born: November 30, 1992 (age 33) Shizuoka prefecture, Japan
- Occupations: Professional competition climber and boulderer
- Height: 176 cm (5 ft 9 in)
- Weight: 64 kg (141 lb)

Climbing career
- Type of climber: Competition climbing, Bouldering
- Highest grade: Bouldering: 8B+ (V14)
- Known for: World Champion and winner of multiple World Cup medals
Medal record
Men's competition climbing
Representing Japan
World Championships
Gold medal – first place	2021 Moscow	Bouldering
World Cup (Season)
Second place	2021	Bouldering
Third place	2022	Bouldering
Asian Championships
Gold medal – first place	2017	Lead
Gold medal – first place	2017	Bouldering
Gold medal – first place	2018	Lead
Silver medal – second place	2018	Combined
Gold medal – first place	2019	Lead
Silver medal – second place	2019	Bouldering
Gold medal – first place	2019	Combined
Bronze medal – third place	2022	Lead
Silver medal – second place	2022	Combined
World Games
Silver medal – second place	2022 Birmingham	Boulder
Asian Games
Silver medal – second place	2018	Combined
Asian Cup (Season)
Second place	2017	Lead

Kokoro Fujii (藤井 快 Fujii Kokoro, born November 30, 1992) is a Japanese professional competition climber who specialises in competition bouldering. He has won the men's bouldering event at the 2021 IFSC Climbing World Championships, and in multiple medals at IFSC Climbing World Cup events, finishing second overall in bouldering during the 2021 World Cup season.

== Rankings ==
=== Climbing World Cup ===
Discipline	2018	2019	2021	2022	2023
Lead	24	7	24	32	-
Bouldering	6	5	2	3	13
Speed	89	38	-	-	-
Combined	3	5	-	-	-

=== Climbing World Championships ===
Discipline	2014	2016	2018	2019	2021	2023
Lead	-	-	27	14	13	-
Bouldering	10	12	5	4	1	6
Speed	-	-	36	11	-	-
Combined	-	-	6	6	-	-

== World Cup podiums ==
=== Bouldering ===
Season	Gold	Silver	Bronze	Total
2016	2		1	3
2017	1			1
2018	1			1
2021		1	1	2
2022	1		1	2
Total	5	1	3	9

== See also ==
- List of grade milestones in rock climbing
- History of rock climbing
- Rankings of most career IFSC gold medals
