= Kai Harada =

Japanese climber

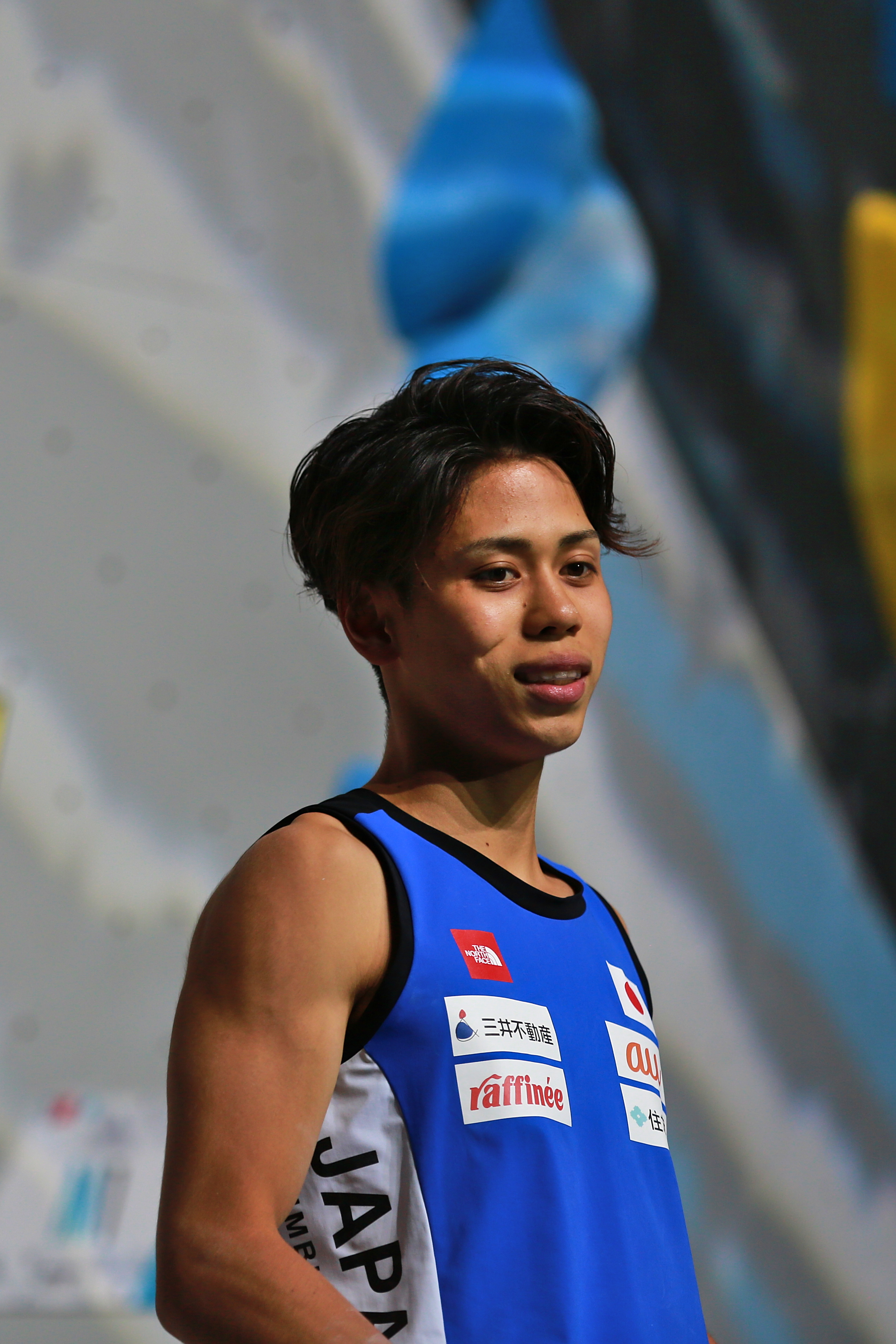
- Harada at the Climbing World Championships in 2018

Personal information
- Nationality: Japanese
- Born: March 10, 1999 (age 27) Kanagawa
- Occupation: Professional competition climber
- Height: 169 cm (5 ft 7 in)

Climbing career
- Type of climber: Bouldering
- Ape index: +11 cm (4 in)
- Highest grade: Bouldering: V15 (8C)
- Known for: Winner of Bouldering at the Climbing World Championships in 2018
Medal record
Men's competition climbing
Representing Japan
World Championships
Gold medal – first place	2018 Innsbruck	Bouldering
World Cup
Silver medal – second place	Kranj 2019	Lead
Silver medal – second place	Wujiang 2019	Bouldering

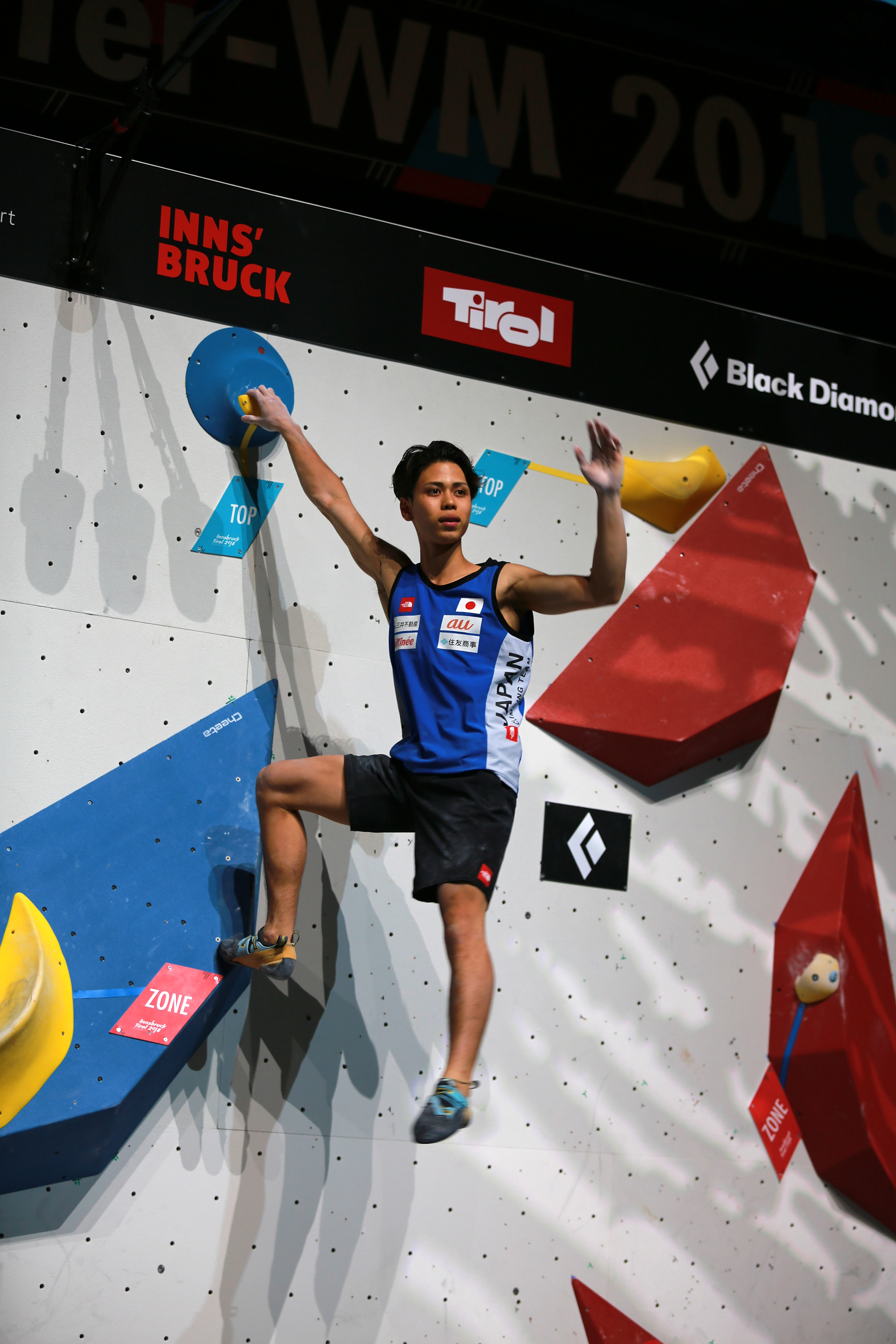
Climbing World Championships 2018 Boulder Final Harada (BT0A9215)

Kai Harada (原田 海 Harada Kai; born May 10, 1999) is a Japanese competition climber who specialises in bouldering.

Harada started climbing in 2009 in Osaka. He started competition climbing in 2015, placing in the Youth A Bouldering Championships and the Junior Asian Championships.

In 2018 he won the Bouldering Climbing World Championships as an outsider, and was the only person to get four tops in the final.

In December 2020, Harada's qualification for the Tokyo 2020 Olympics was confirmed after a dispute between the IFSC and the Japan Mountaineering and Sport Climbing Association.

== Rankings ==
=== Climbing World Cup ===
Discipline	2017	2018	2019
Lead	-	36	
Bouldering	16	16	12
Speed	-	-	
Combined	53	6	

=== Climbing World Championships ===
Youth

Discipline	2017 Juniors	2018 Juniors
Bouldering	11	3
Lead	13	3
Speed	22	33
Combined	5	-

Adult

Discipline	2018	2019
Lead	10	7
Bouldering	1	9
Speed	-	32
Combined	4	

== Number of medals in the Climbing World Cup ==
=== Bouldering ===
Season	Gold	Silver	Bronze	Total
2019		1		1
Total	0	1	0	1

== Notable ascents ==
=== Boulder problems ===
8C (V15):

- G-Master - Rocklands (RSA) - July 2024

8B+ (V14):

- Bloody Mary - Rocklands (RSA) - June 2024

8B (V13):

- The Buttermilker - Bishop (USA) - February 2025
