= 2025 IFSC Climbing World Cup =

Sport season

- Organiser: IFSC
- Edition: 37th
- Events: 18: 6 Boulder 6 Lead 6 Speed
- Locations: 14: Keqiao (B) Wujiang (L, S) Bali (L, S) Curitiba (B) Salt Lake City (B) Denver (S) Prague (B) Bern (B) Innsbruck (B, L) Kraków (S) Chamonix (L, S) Madrid (L) Koper (L) Guiyang (S)
- Dates: 18 April – 13 September 2025

Lead
- Men: (Spain) Alberto Ginés López
- Women: (United Kingdom) Erin McNeice
- Team: Japan

Boulder
- Men: (Japan) Sorato Anraku
- Women: (France) Oriane Bertone
- Team: Japan

Speed
- Men: (Indonesia) Kiromal Katibin
- Women: (United States) Emma Hunt
- Team: China

The 2025 IFSC Climbing World Cup is the 37th edition of the international competition climbing series organised by the International Federation of Sport Climbing (IFSC), held in 14 locations. There are 18 events per gender: six events each in the competition bouldering, competition lead climbing, and competition speed climbing disciplines. The series began on 18 April in Keqiao, Shaoxing with the first bouldering World Cup of the season, and concluded on 13 September in Guiyang.

== Scheduling ==
In September 2024, IFSC announced the 2025 competition schedule. This season featured the first-ever IFSC World Cup in South America, the Bouldering World Cup in Curitiba in May. The 2025 edition also featured the first IFSC World Cup events held in Bali, Denver, and Kraków.

The schedule accommodates the IFSC Climbing World Youth Championships in Helsinki from 28 July to 3 August; the World Games in Chengdu from 7 to 17 August; and the IFSC World Championships in Seoul from 21 to 28 September.

== Competition format and ranking ==
The top three finishers in each individual competition receive medals, and the overall winners are awarded trophies. At the end of the season, an overall ranking is determined based upon points, which athletes are awarded for finishing in the top 40 of each individual event.

Starting with the 2025 edition, each country's federation is limited to a maximum of six athletes per gender per discipline for each event. Previously, athletes ranked in the top 10 by the IFSC in a particular category received invites "by name" and did not count against federation quotas.

IFSC also announced changes to the competition rules. Starting this season, both lead and bouldering feature 24 athletes in the semifinal rounds and 8 in the final rounds; previously, 26 athletes qualified for lead semifinals and 6 athletes qualified for bouldering finals. In addition, boulder finals feature multiple athletes on the wall simultaneously. IFSC also introduced a point system to bouldering, in which athletes are awarded a maximum of 25 points for a top and 10 points for a zone on each problem, with a deduction of 0.1 points for an unsuccessful attempt.

== Athlete absences ==
Following the 2024 Paris Olympics, several athletes announced they would sit out the season or make limited appearances. Women's gold medalist Janja Garnbret announced she would only attend two World Cups and the IFSC World Championships this year and spend more time climbing outdoors, while silver medalist Brooke Raboutou said she was similarly taking a break to focus on outdoor climbing and Oriane Bertone said she would not appear until late in the season. Former women's bouldering champion Natalia Grossman announced she had torn her ACL and meniscus and fellow Olympian Jenya Kazbekova announced she was pregnant.

Staša Gejo announced her retirement, while Adam Ondra, Alexander Megos, and Yannick Flohé said they would step back from bouldering to focus on lead. Jakob Schubert sustained a ligament injury to his finger in January, forcing him to withdraw from World Cups earlier in the season. He returned for the lead World Cup in Koper.

== Competition highlights ==
In the second World Cup event at Wujiang on 27 April, Great Britain's Erin McNeice and South Korea's Chaehyun Seo shared the women's lead gold medal after they scored 41 in the final round, tied each other in the semifinal and qualifying rounds, and were both timed at 4 minutes 26 seconds. It was the first time multiple climbers shared the gold medal since the 2011 Chamonix World Cup.

In an unprecedented first in men's bouldering, Japan's Sorato Anraku won the bouldering World Cups in Keqiao, Curitiba and Salt Lake City, becoming the only male climber to win 3 successive bouldering World Cups in the same season.

== Overview ==
No.	Location	D	G	Gold		Silver		Bronze	
1	(China) Keqiao; 18–20 April	B	M	(Japan) Sorato Anraku	99.7	(South Korea) Lee Dohyun	99.3	(Japan) Meichi Narasaki	83.9
1	(China) Keqiao; 18–20 April	B	W	(United States) Anastasia Sanders	54.7	(France) Oriane Bertone	44.9	(United Kingdom) Erin McNeice	44.8
2	(China) Wujiang; 25–27 April	L	M	(Japan) Sorato Anraku	TOP	(Japan) Neo Suzuki	40+	(Spain) Alberto Ginés López	39+
2	(China) Wujiang; 25–27 April	L	W	(United Kingdom) Erin McNeice (South Korea) Seo Chae-hyun	41 (4:26)	-	-	(United States) Anastasia Sanders	39+
2	(China) Wujiang; 25–27 April	S	M	(China) Long Jianguo	4.88	(Ukraine) Hryhorii Ilchyshyn	4.98	(Indonesia) Kiromal Katibin	4.75
2	(China) Wujiang; 25–27 April	S	W	(China) Zhang Shaoqin	6.32	(South Korea) Jeong Ji-min	6.37	(China) Deng Lijuan	6.34
3	(Indonesia) Bali; 2–4 May	L	M	(Japan) Satone Yoshida	42	(France) Max Bertone	41	(Spain) Alberto Ginés López	39+
3	(Indonesia) Bali; 2–4 May	L	W	(United Kingdom) Erin McNeice	TOP	(South Korea) Seo Chae-hyun	TOP	(Japan) Ai Mori	45
3	(Indonesia) Bali; 2–4 May	S	M	(United States) Samuel Watson	4.64	(Japan) Ryo Omasa	FLS	(Indonesia) Kiromal Katibin	4.81
3	(Indonesia) Bali; 2–4 May	S	W	(Poland) Aleksandra Miroslaw	6.37	(China) Zhou Yafei	8.12	(Indonesia) Kadek Adi Asih	7.27
4	(Brazil) Curitiba; 16–18 May	B	M	(Japan) Sorato Anraku	69.7	(France) Mejdi Schalck	58.9	(Japan) Tomoa Narasaki	39.0
4	(Brazil) Curitiba; 16–18 May	B	W	(France) Naïlé Meignan	99.6	(France) Oriane Bertone	99.5	(Italy) Camilla Moroni	83.8
5	(United States) Salt Lake City; 23–25 May	B	M	(Japan) Sorato Anraku	84.4	(Japan) Sohta Amagasa	69.6	(South Korea) Lee Dohyun	69.5
5	(United States) Salt Lake City; 23–25 May	B	W	(Japan) Mao Nakamura	84.7	(France) Zélia Avezou	70.0	(United States) Anastasia Sanders	70.0
6	(United States) Denver; 31 May – 1 June	S	M	(Indonesia) Kiromal Katibin	4.83	(United States) Zach Hammer	4.88	(United States) Samuel Watson	4.89
6	(United States) Denver; 31 May – 1 June	S	W	(United States) Emma Hunt	6.36	(Poland) Natalia Kałucka	6.44	(China) Deng Lijuan	6.50
7	(Czech Republic) Prague; 6–8 June	B	M	(France) Mejdi Schalck	99.1	(Japan) Sorato Anraku	84.1	(France) Samuel Richard	84.1
7	(Czech Republic) Prague; 6–8 June	B	W	(France) Oriane Bertone	84.8	(France) Agathe Calliet	69.7	(Japan) Melody Sekikawa	69.5
8	(Switzerland) Bern; 13–15 June	B	M	(China) Pan Yufei	84.2	(France) Mejdi Schalck	84.1	(Japan) Sorato Anraku	83.7
8	(Switzerland) Bern; 13–15 June	B	W	(United Kingdom) Erin McNeice	99.5	(United States) Anastasia Sanders	84.4	(Japan) Miho Nonaka	84.3
9	(Austria) Innsbruck; 25 – 29 June	B	M	(United Kingdom) Toby Roberts	69.8	(Japan) Sorato Anraku	69.6	(Belgium) Hannes Van Duysen	54.6
9	(Austria) Innsbruck; 25 – 29 June	B	W	(Slovenia) Janja Garnbret	99.3	(France) Oriane Bertone	69.8	(Japan) Anon Matsufuji	59.5
9	(Austria) Innsbruck; 25 – 29 June	L	M	(Japan) Neo Suzuki	TOP	(United Kingdom) Toby Roberts	TOP	(Spain) Alberto Ginés López	TOP
9	(Austria) Innsbruck; 25 – 29 June	L	W	(Slovenia) Janja Garnbret	41	(Italy) Laura Rogora	33	(United Kingdom) Erin McNeice	32+
10	(Poland) Kraków; 5–6 July	S	M	(Indonesia) Raharjati Nursamsa	4.73	(Indonesia) Kiromal Katibin	FLL	(Japan) Ryo Omasa	5.49
10	(Poland) Kraków; 5–6 July	S	W	(Indonesia) Desak Made Rita Kusuma Dewi	6.27	(United States) Emma Hunt	7.56	(Poland) Aleksandra Mirosław	6.36
11	(France) Chamonix; 11–13 July	S	M	(United States) Samuel Watson	4.65	(Kazakhstan) Rishat Khaibullin	4.87	(United States) Zach Hammer	4.96
11	(France) Chamonix; 11–13 July	S	W	(Poland) Aleksandra Mirosław	6.19	(Indonesia) Desak Made Rita Kusuma Dewi	6.46	(United States) Emma Hunt	6.35
11	(France) Chamonix; 11–13 July	L	M	(Japan) Sorato Anraku	TOP	(Spain) Alberto Ginés López	43+	(Italy) Filip Schenk	43+
11	(France) Chamonix; 11–13 July	L	W	(South Korea) Seo Chae-hyun	44+	(United States) Anastasia Sanders	43+	(United Kingdom) Erin McNeice	42+
12	(Spain) Madrid; 17–19 July	L	M	(South Korea) Lee Dohyun	40+	(Spain) Alberto Ginés López	40	(Japan) Satone Yoshida	39+
12	(Spain) Madrid; 17–19 July	L	W	(United States) Anastasia Sanders	TOP	(Italy) Laura Rogora	48+	(United States) Brooke Raboutou	48+
13	(Slovenia) Koper; 5–6 September	L	M	(Japan) Sorato Anraku	48+	(Spain) Alberto Ginés López	47+	(United Kingdom) Toby Roberts	46+
13	(Slovenia) Koper; 5–6 September	L	W	(Slovenia) Janja Garnbret	47+	(South Korea) Seo Chae-hyun	38+	(Italy) Laura Rogora	37+
14	(China) Guiyang; 12–13 September	S	M	(China) Chu Shouhong	4.79	(Japan) Ryo Omasa	4.99	(Germany) Leander Carmanns	4.98
14	(China) Guiyang; 12–13 September	S	W	(China) Meng Shixue	6.30	(South Korea) Jeong Ji-min	6.36	(United States) Emma Hunt	6.44
OVERALL		B	M	(Japan) Sorato Anraku	5300	(France) Mejdi Schalck	4145	(Japan) Sohta Amagasa	3240
OVERALL		B	W	(France) Oriane Bertone	4375	(Japan) Mao Nakamura	3480	(United States) Anastasia Sanders	3290
OVERALL		L	M	(Spain) Alberto Ginés López	4485	(Japan) Sorato Anraku	4145	(Japan) Satone Yoshida	4130
OVERALL		L	W	(United Kingdom) Erin McNeice	4503	(South Korea) Seo Chae-hyun	4463	(Italy) Laura Rogora	3900
OVERALL		S	M	(Indonesia) Kiromal Katibin	3945	(United States) Samuel Watson	3629	(Japan) Ryo Omasa	3410
OVERALL		S	W	(United States) Emma Hunt	3795	(China) Zhou Yafei	3495	(Indonesia) Desak Made Rita Kusuma Dewi	3390

== Bouldering ==
The overall ranking is determined based upon points, which athletes are awarded for finishing in the top 80 of each individual event. The end-of-season standings are based on the sum of points earned. The national ranking is the sum of the points of that country's three best male and female athletes.

=== Men ===
The results of the ten most successful athletes of the Bouldering World Cup 2025:

Rank	Name	Points	Keqiao	Curitiba	Salt Lake City	Prague	Bern	Innsbruck
1	(Japan) Sorato Anraku	5300	1. 1000	1. 1000	1. 1000	2. 805	3. 690	2. 805
2	(France) Mejdi Schalck	4145	5. 545	2. 805	6. 495	1. 1000	2. 805	6. 495
3	(Japan) Sohta Amagasa	3240	9. 380	4. 610	2. 805	4. 610	9. 380	7. 455
4	(South Korea) Lee Dohyun	3105	2. 805	-	3. 690	7. 455	4. 610	5. 545
5	(Belgium) Hannes Van Duysen	2355	24. 105	15. 240	13. 280	6. 495	5. 545	3. 690
6	(France) Paul Jenft	1965	7. 455	7. 455	14. 260	-	6. 495	12. 300
7	(Japan) Tomoa Narasaki	1941	4. 610	3. 690	10. 337.5	41. 13.5	12. 290	-
8	(Slovenia) Anže Peharc	1925	16. 220	6. 495	18. 185	8. 415	15. 230	9. 380
9	(Japan) Meichi Narasaki	1875	3. 690	9. 380	5. 545	-	-	14. 260
10	(China) Pan Yufei	1764	36. 24	-	-	5. 545	1. 1000	17. 195

=== Women ===
The results of the ten most successful athletes of the Bouldering World Cup 2025:

Rank	Name	Points	Keqiao	Curitiba	Salt Lake City	Prague	Bern	Innsbruck
1	(France) Oriane Bertone	4375	2. 805	2. 805	4. 610	1. 1000	10. 350	2. 805
2	(Japan) Mao Nakamura	3480	4. 610	4. 610	1. 1000	19. 170	5. 545	5. 545
3	(United States) Anastasia Sanders	3290	1. 1000	-	3. 690	12. 300	2. 805	6. 495
4	(Japan) Melody Sekikawa	2880	6. 495	5. 545	13. 280	3. 690	8. 415	7. 455
5	(Japan) Anon Matsufuji	2670	11. 270.83	7. 455	14. 260	5. 520	6. 475	3. 690
6	(United Kingdom) Erin McNeice	2512	3. 690	-	-	4. 610	1. 1000	16. 212.5
7	(Japan) Miho Nonaka	2370	5. 545	-	6. 495	9. 380	3. 690	13. 260
8	(Italy) Camilla Moroni	2213	27. 68	3. 690	11. 325	16. 220	12. 300	4. 610
9	(France) Agathe Calliet	2116	17. 178.75	14. 260	12. 300	2. 805	14. 260	11. 312.5
10	(France) Zélia Avezou	2035	-	15. 240	2. 805	-	4. 610	9. 380

=== National Teams ===
The results of the ten most successful countries of the Bouldering World Cup 2025:

Country names as used by the IFSC

Rank	Name	Points	Keqiao	Curitiba	Salt Lake City	Prague	Bern	Innsbruck
1	Japan	21812.5	3950	3950	4260	3295	3070	3287.5
2	France	18465.75	2478.75	3675	2920	4195	2815	2382
3	United Kingdom	9182.75	1441.5	241	1446	1956.5	1721.75	2376
4	United States	8535.98	1994.16	1144.33	2100.5	666.33	1699	931.66
5	Slovenia	5427.53	970.83	745	300	1010	478.7	1923
6	(South Korea) Korea	5035.82	1431.5	300	862	619.5	983.16	839.66
7	Italy	4818.83	162.3	1402	602	535.5	702.2	1414.83
8	Belgium	3791.15	171.5	740	524	889	705.25	761.4
9	Germany	3785.82	848.83	940	428	669	645	254.99
10	Austria	3264.18	417.75	978.33	351.5	631.75	396.75	488.1

== Lead ==
The overall ranking is determined based upon points, which athletes are awarded for finishing in the top 80 of each individual event. The end-of-season standings are based on the sum of points earned. The national ranking is the sum of the points of that country's three best male and female athletes.

=== Men ===
The results of the ten most successful athletes of the Lead World Cup 2025:

Rank	Name	Points	Wujiang	Bali	Innsbruck	Chamonix	Madrid	Koper
1	(Spain) Alberto Ginés López	4485	3. 690	3. 690	3. 690	2. 805	2. 805	2. 805
2	(Japan) Sorato Anraku	4145	1. 1000	16. 220	9. 380	1. 1000	5. 545	1. 1000
3	(Japan) Satone Yoshida	4130	4. 610	1. 1000	4. 610	4. 610	3. 690	4. 610
4	(Japan) Neo Suzuki	3315	2. 805	6. 495	1. 1000	21. 145	7. 455	8. 415
5	(South Korea) Lee Dohyun	2950	16. 220	5. 545	7. 455	9. 380	1. 1000	10. 350
6	(Germany) Yannick Flohé	2485	8. 415	4. 610	5. 545	10. 350	18. 185	9. 380
7	(Italy) Filip Schenk	2245	7. 455	9. 380	25. 95	3. 690	12. 300	11. 325
8	(United Kingdom) Toby Roberts	2240	15. 240	-	2. 805	20. 155	10. 350	3. 690
9	(France) Max Bertone	2195	18. 185	2. 805	6. 495	19. 170	14. 260	13. 280
10	(Japan) Shion Omata	1866	14. 260	7. 455	29. 56	8. 415	6. 495	18. 185

=== Women ===
The results of the ten most successful athletes of the Lead World Cup 2025:

Rank	Name	Points	Wujiang	Bali	Innsbruck	Chamonix	Madrid	Koper
1	(United Kingdom) Erin McNeice	4503	1. 902.5	1. 1000	3. 690	3. 690	4. 610	4. 610
2	(South Korea) Seo Chae-hyun	4463	1. 902.5	2. 805	6. 495	1. 1000	7. 455	2. 805
3	(Italy) Laura Rogora	3900	4. 610	4. 610	2. 805	9. 380	2. 805	3. 690
4	(United States) Anastasia Sanders	3040	3. 690	-	5. 545	2. 805	1. 1000	-
5	(Slovenia) Rosa Rekar	2520	11. 325	8. 415	4. 610	16. 220	6. 495	7. 455
6	(Belgium) Heloïse Doumont	2048	15. 240	10. 337.5	7. 455	24. 105	8. 415	6. 495
7	(Slovenia) Janja Garnbret	2000	-	-	1. 1000	-	-	1. 1000
8	(South Korea) Kim Chaeyeong	1730	16. 220	12. 300	10. 350	11. 325	20. 155	9. 380
9	(Slovenia) Mia Krampl	1523	9. 380	7. 455	23. 120	30. 48	9. 365	20. 155
10	(France) Manon Hily	1495	-	-	12. 300	12. 300	5. 545	10. 350

=== National Teams ===
The results of the ten most successful countries of the Lead World Cup 2025:

Country names as used by the IFSC

Rank	Name	Points	Wujiang	Bali	Innsbruck	Chamonix	Madrid	Koper
1	Japan	16762	2717	3237.5	2745	3050	2600	2412.5
2	(South Korea) Korea	11287.33	1740.5	1998.83	1407	2014	2005	2122
3	Slovenia	9738.33	1550	1180.83	2357.5	1019	2200	1431
4	Italy	8948.55	1690	1421.25	1224	1549.5	1548	1515.8
5	France	8330.8	822	1355	1700	1814	1191	1448.8
6	United States	8166	1202.5	415.5	1310.5	2267	273	2697.5
7	United Kingdom	7276.83	1166.5	1057.33	1699	881	1454	1019
8	Spain	6135.25	690	690	856	1539.5	1087	1272.75
9	Germany	4933.63	1135.33	1010.5	1035	766	522	464.8
10	Austria	4218.33	593	650.83	589	507	1332.5	546

== Speed ==
The overall ranking is determined based upon points, which athletes are awarded for finishing in the top 80 of each individual event. The end-of-season standings are based on the sum of points earned. The national ranking is the sum of the points of that country's three best male and female athletes.

=== Men ===
The results of the ten most successful athletes of the Speed World Cup 2025:

Rank	Name	Points	Wujiang	Bali	Denver	Kraków	Chamonix	Guiyang
1	(Indonesia) Kiromal Katibin	3945	3. 690	3. 690	1. 1000	2. 805	9. 380	9. 380
2	(United States) Samuel Watson	3629	4. 610	1. 1000	3. 690	62. 4	1. 1000	11. 325
3	(Japan) Ryo Omasa	3410	15. 240	2. 805	8. 415	3. 690	7. 455	2. 805
4	(China) Long Jianguo	3315	1. 1000	5. 545	9. 380	10. 350	5. 545	6. 495
5	(China) Chu Shouhong	3110	5. 545	6. 495	4. 610	16. 220	15. 240	1. 1000
6	(United States) Zach Hammer	2946	9. 380	55. 6	2. 805	4. 610	3. 690	7. 455
7	(Kazakhstan) Amir Maimuratov	2625	8. 415	11. 325	6. 495	5. 545	6. 495	10. 350
8	(Indonesia) Raharjati Nursamsa	2505	-	4. 610	-	1. 1000	10. 350	5. 545
9	(Germany) Leander Carmanns	1990	-	-	5. 545	6. 495	14. 260	3. 690
10	(Ukraine) Yaroslav Tkach	1900	7. 455	10. 350	21. 145	19. 170	19. 170	4. 610

=== Women ===
The results of the ten most successful athletes of the Speed World Cup 2025:

Rank	Name	Points	Wujiang	Bali	Denver	Kraków	Chamonix	Guiyang
1	(United States) Emma Hunt	3795	4. 610	-	1. 1000	2. 805	3. 690	3. 690
2	(China) Zhou Yafei	3495	9. 380	2. 805	4. 610	5. 545	5. 545	4. 610
3	(Indonesia) Desak Made Rita Kusuma Dewi	3390	5. 545	5. 545	-	1. 1000	2. 805	6. 495
4	(Poland) Aleksandra Miroslaw	3185	6. 495	1. 1000	-	3. 690	1. 1000	-
5	(South Korea) Jeong Ji-min	3170	2. 805	4. 610	-	6. 495	7. 455	2. 805
6	(Poland) Natalia Kałucka	2745	7. 455	9. 380	2. 805	4. 610	6. 495	-
7	(China) Zhang Shaoqin	2465	1. 1000	40. 15	6. 495	13. 280	16. 220	7. 455
8	(China) Qin Yumei	2270	10. 350	-	5. 545	8. 415	4. 610	10. 350
9	(China) Deng Lijuan	2095	3. 690	6. 495	3. 690	16. 220	-	-
10	(China) Meng Shixue	2002	8. 415	-	7. 455	32. 37	25. 95	1. 1000

== Season podium table ==
Rank	Nation	Gold	Silver	Bronze	Total
1	Japan (JPN)	1	2	3	6
2	United States (USA)	1	1	1	3
3	France (FRA)	1	1	0	2
4	Indonesia (INA)	1	0	1	2
5	Great Britain (GBR)	1	0	0	1
5	Spain (ESP)	1	0	0	1
7	China (CHN)	0	1	0	1
7	South Korea (KOR)	0	1	0	1
9	Italy (ITA)	0	0	1	1
Totals (9 entries)		6	6	6	18

== Medal table ==
Rank	Nation	Gold	Silver	Bronze	Total
1	Japan (JPN)	9	6	9	24
2	United States (USA)	5	4	7	16
3	China (CHN)	5	1	2	8
4	Great Britain (GBR)	4	1	4	9
5	France (FRA)	3	8	1	12
6	South Korea (KOR)	3	5	1	9
7	Indonesia (INA)	3	2	3	8
8	Slovenia (SLO)	3	0	0	3
9	Poland (POL)	2	1	1	4
10	Spain (ESP)	0	3	3	6
11	Italy (ITA)	0	2	3	5
12	Kazakhstan (KAZ)	0	1	0	1
12	Ukraine (UKR)	0	1	0	1
14	Belgium (BEL)	0	0	1	1
14	Germany (GER)	0	0	1	1
Totals (15 entries)		37	35	36	108
