= Lead climbing at the 2025 IFSC Climbing World Cup =

- Location: Wujiang, China; Bali, Indonesia; Innsbruck, Austria; Chamonix, France; Madrid, Spain; Koper, Slovenia
- Dates: 25 April – 6 September 2025

Champions
- Men: (Spain) Alberto Ginés López
- Women: (United Kingdom) Erin McNeice

Competition lead climbing at the 2025 IFSC Climbing World Cup was held over six stages at six different locations, from 25 April to 6 September 2025. The top three in each competition received medals, and at the end of the season, the overall winners were awarded trophies. The overall winners were determined based upon points, which athletes were awarded for finishing in the top 40 of each event. Alberto Ginés López won the men's season title, Erin McNeice won the women's season title, and Japan won the national team title.

== Overview ==
Date	Location	Routesetters*	Men	Women
April, 25-27	Wujiang, China	(United Kingdom) **Yann Genoux**; (Japan) Hiroshi Okano; (France) Vincent De Girolamo	(Japan) Sorato Anraku	(United Kingdom) Erin McNeice (South Korea) Seo Chae-hyun
May, 2-4	Bali, Indonesia	(Austria) **Matthias Woitzuck**; (France) Romain Cabessut; (China) Ma Zida	(Japan) Satone Yoshida	(United Kingdom) Erin McNeice
June, 25-29	Innsbruck, Austria	(Japan) **Akito Matsushima**; (United States) Ryan Sewell; (Austria) Jacopo Larcher	(Japan) Neo Suzuki	(Slovenia) Janja Garnbret
July, 11-13	Chamonix, France	(United States) **Brad Weaver**; (Poland) Olga Niemiec; (France) Julien Gras	(Japan) Sorato Anraku	(South Korea) Seo Chae-hyun
July, 17-19	Madrid, Spain	(Austria) **Martin Hammerer**; (Japan) Hiroshi Okano; (Germany) Christian Bindhammer	(South Korea) Lee Dohyun	(United States) Anastasia Sanders
September, 5-6	Koper, Slovenia	(Czech Republic) **Jan Zbranek**; (Austria) Martin Hammerer; (France) Romain Cabessut	(Japan) Sorato Anraku	(Slovenia) Janja Garnbret
**OVERALL WINNERS**			(Spain) **Alberto Ginés López**	(United Kingdom) **Erin McNeice**
**NATIONAL TEAM**			**Japan**	

* Chief routesetters are in bold.

== Overall ranking ==
The overall ranking is determined based upon points, which athletes are awarded for finishing in the top 40 of each individual event. There are six competitions in the season, but only the best five attempts are counted. The national ranking is the sum of the points of that country's three best male and female athletes. Results displayed in parentheses are not counted.

=== Men ===
The results of the ten most successful athletes of the Lead World Cup 2025:

Rank	Name	Points	Wujiang	Bali	Innsbruck	Chamonix	Madrid	Koper
1	(Spain) Alberto Ginés López	4485	3. 690	3. 690	3. 690	2. 805	2. 805	2. 805
2	(Japan) Sorato Anraku	4145	1. 1000	16. 220	9. 380	1. 1000	5. 545	1. 1000
3	(Japan) Satone Yoshida	4130	4. 610	1. 1000	4. 610	4. 610	3. 690	4. 610
4	(Japan) Neo Suzuki	3315	2. 805	6. 495	1. 1000	21. 145	7. 455	8. 415
5	(South Korea) Lee Dohyun	2950	16. 220	5. 545	7. 455	9. 380	1. 1000	10. 350
6	(Germany) Yannick Flohé	2485	8. 415	4. 610	5. 545	10. 350	18. 185	9. 380
7	(Italy) Filip Schenk	2245	7. 455	9. 380	25. 95	3. 690	12. 300	11. 325
8	(United Kingdom) Toby Roberts	2240	15. 240	-	2. 805	20. 155	10. 350	3. 690
9	(France) Max Bertone	2195	18. 185	2. 805	6. 495	19. 170	14. 260	13. 280
10	(Japan) Shion Omata	1866	14. 260	7. 455	29. 56	8. 415	6. 495	18. 185
11	(Slovenia) Luka Potočar	1784.5	6. 495	28. 59.5	11. 325	7. 455	13. 280	19. 170
12	(United States) Jesse Grupper	1648	13. 280	13. 280	8. 415	14. 260	9. 380	33. 33
13	(Switzerland) Jonas Utelli	1570	9. 380	21. 145	20. 155	6. 495	15. 240	20. 155
14	(Italy) Giovanni Placci	1535	12. 300	14. 260	13. 280	22. 130	11. 325	15. 240
15	(United States) Colin Duffy	1203	-	-	30. 48	5. 545	4. 610	-
16	(Indonesia) Putra Tri Ramadani	1140	-	17. 205	16. 220	-	16. 220	6. 495
17	(Belgium) Hannes Van Duysen	960	10. 350	-	18. 185	13. 280	21. 145	-
18	(France) Sam Avezou	930	20. 155	-	10. 350	16. 220	-	17. 205
19	(South Korea) Hyunseung Noh	926	27. 73	12. 300	27. 73	15. 240	23. 120	23. 120
20	(Czech Republic) Jakub Konecny	878	-	-	19. 170	27. 73	8. 415	16. 220

=== Women ===
The results of the ten most successful athletes of the Lead World Cup 2025:

Rank	Name	Points	Wujiang	Bali	Innsbruck	Chamonix	Madrid	Koper
1	(United Kingdom) Erin McNeice	4503	1. 902.5	1. 1000	3. 690	3. 690	4. 610	4. 610
2	(South Korea) Seo Chae-hyun	4463	1. 902.5	2. 805	6. 495	1. 1000	7. 455	2. 805
3	(Italy) Laura Rogora	3900	4. 610	4. 610	2. 805	9. 380	2. 805	3. 690
4	(United States) Anastasia Sanders	3040	3. 690	-	5. 545	2. 805	1. 1000	-
5	(Slovenia) Rosa Rekar	2520	11. 325	8. 415	4. 610	16. 220	6. 495	7. 455
6	(Belgium) Heloïse Doumont	2048	15. 240	10. 337.5	7. 455	24. 105	8. 415	6. 495
7	(Slovenia) Janja Garnbret	2000	-	-	1. 1000	-	-	1. 1000
8	(South Korea) Kim Chaeyeong	1730	16. 220	12. 300	10. 350	11. 325	20. 155	9. 380
9	(Slovenia) Mia Krampl	1523	9. 380	7. 455	23. 120	30. 48	9. 365	20. 155
10	(France) Manon Hily	1495	-	-	12. 300	12. 300	5. 545	10. 350
11	(Slovenia) Lucka Rakovec	1445	-	-	8. 415	17. 205	13. 280	5. 545
12	(Australia) Oceania Mackenzie	1445	5. 545	5. 545	-	15. 240	-	-
13	(United States) Brooke Raboutou	1330	-	-	-	4. 610	3. 690	-
14	(France) Camille Pouget	1295	-	-	16. 220	5. 545	11. 325	17. 205
15	(Austria) Mattea Pötzi	1220	13. 280	24. 105	13. 280	20. 155	23. 120	13. 280
16	(Japan) Natsuki Tanii	1135	23. 120	19. 170	11. 325	8. 415	-	24. 105
17	(Japan) Mei Kotake	1019	33. 31.5	10. 337.5	-	10. 350	12. 300	-
18	(Spain) Geila Macià Martín	953	-	-	27. 73	7. 455	18. 185	15. 240
19	(France) Hélène Janicot	930	7. 455	9. 380	-	-	-	25. 95
20	(Austria) Flora Oblasser	842.5	19. 170	6. 495	-	-	-	18. 177.5

=== National Teams ===
The results of the ten most successful countries of the Lead World Cup 2025:

Country names as used by the IFSC

Rank	Name	Points	Wujiang	Bali	Innsbruck	Chamonix	Madrid	Koper
1	Japan	16762	2717	3237.5	2745	3050	2600	2412.5
2	(South Korea) Korea	11287.33	1740.5	1998.83	1407	2014	2005	2122
3	Slovenia	9738.33	1550	1180.83	2357.5	1019	2200	1431
4	Italy	8948.55	1690	1421.25	1224	1549.5	1548	1515.8
5	France	8330.8	822	1355	1700	1814	1191	1448.8
6	United States	8166	1202.5	415.5	1310.5	2267	273	2697.5
7	United Kingdom	7276.83	1166.5	1057.33	1699	881	1454	1019
8	Spain	6135.25	690	690	856	1539.5	1087	1272.75
9	Germany	4933.63	1135.33	1010.5	1035	766	522	464.8
10	Austria	4218.33	593	650.83	589	507	1332.5	546

== Wujiang, China (April, 25-27) ==
62 men and 60 women attended the event.

In the men's, last year's winner Toby Roberts did not advance past the semi-finals. Sorato Anraku topped the final route and claimed victory in the first lead World Cup of the 2025 season. Neo Suzuki claimed the silver medal after re-climbing the final route due to an upheld belaying appeal. Alberto Ginés López placed third.

In women's, last year's winner Janja Garnbret did not compete. Erin McNeice and Seo Chae-hyun had identical scores going into the final. Both athletes climbed to the same point with a time of 4:26 in the final — resulting in a shared gold. This also marked Erin McNeice's first World Cup win. Anastasia Sanders placed third.

Men						Women					
Rank	Name	Qualification		Semi-Final	Final	Rank	Name	Qualification		Semi-Final	Final
Rank	Name	R1	R2	Semi-Final	Final	Rank	Name	R1	R2	Semi-Final	Final
1st place, gold medalist(s)	(Japan) Sorato Anraku	TOP	TOP	49+	TOP	1st place, gold medalist(s)	(United Kingdom) Erin McNeice (South Korea) Seo Chae-hyun	TOP TOP	TOP TOP	TOP TOP	41 (4:26) 41 (4:26)
2nd place, silver medalist(s)	(Japan) Neo Suzuki	TOP	TOP	47+	40+	2nd place, silver medalist(s)	-	-	-	-	-
3rd place, bronze medalist(s)	(Spain) Alberto Ginés López	TOP	TOP	49+	39+	3rd place, bronze medalist(s)	(United States) Anastasia Sanders	TOP	TOP	TOP	39+
4	(Japan) Satone Yoshida	TOP	TOP	47+	33	4	(Italy) Laura Rogora	25+	TOP	TOP	34+
5	(China) YuFei Pan	41+	TOP	47+	32+	5	(Australia) Oceania Mackenzie	40+	42+	41+	34+
6	(Slovenia) Luka Potočar	TOP	TOP	46	32	6	(China) Yuetong Zhang	40+	37	41+	33+
7	(Italy) Filip Schenk	30	TOP	49+	28+	7	(France) Hélène Janicot	25+	39	41+	33+
8	(Germany) Yannick Flohé	40	TOP	45	28+	8	(Germany) Anna Maria Apel	25+	39+	41+	21

== Bali, Indonesia (May, 2-4) ==
55 men and 51 women attended the event.

In men's, Japan's Satone Yoshida topped a qualification route, ascended higher than anyone else on the semi-final and final routes, and thus securing his first World Cup win. France's Max Bertone took second place while Spain's Alberto Ginés López took third. The winner of last week's event, Japan's Sorato Anraku slipped on the semi-final route, placing 16th.

In women's, identical final and semi-final scores led to count-back to qualification results to determine first and second place. Eventually, Briton Erin McNeice took the win. South Korea's Seo Chae-hyun placed second and Japan's Ai Mori third.

Men						Women					
Rank	Name	Qualification		Semi-Final	Final	Rank	Name	Qualification		Semi-Final	Final
Rank	Name	R1	R2	Semi-Final	Final	Rank	Name	R1	R2	Semi-Final	Final
1st place, gold medalist(s)	(Japan) Satone Yoshida	32+	TOP	36+	42	1st place, gold medalist(s)	(United Kingdom) Erin McNeice	TOP	TOP	TOP	TOP
2nd place, silver medalist(s)	(France) Max Bertone	21	34+	31+	41	2nd place, silver medalist(s)	(South Korea) Seo Chae-hyun	44+	TOP	TOP	TOP
3rd place, bronze medalist(s)	(Spain) Alberto Ginés López	32+	36+	33+	39+	3rd place, bronze medalist(s)	(Japan) Ai Mori	TOP	TOP	49	45
4	(Germany) Yannick Flohé	32+	34+	35+	30+	4	(Italy) Laura Rogora	44+	TOP	48+	42+
5	(South Korea) Lee Dohyun	21	34+	33+	30	5	(Australia) Oceania Mackenzie	30	38+	37+	39+
6	(Japan) Neo Suzuki	30+	39+	33+	29+	6	(Austria) Flora Oblasser	30	22+	38	37+
7	(Japan) Shion Omata	30+	39+	33+	16+	7	(Slovenia) Mia Krampl	37+	28+	37+	34+
8	(Indonesia) Muhammad Rizky Syahrafli Simatupang	19	34+	33+	12	8	(Slovenia) Rosa Rekar	38	32+	37+	31+

== Innsbruck, Austria (June, 25-29) ==
97 men and 76 women attended the event.

In men's, last year's winner Jakob Schubert did not compete due to a finger injury. Japan's Neo Suzuki topped the final route and claimed his first World Cup gold. Great Britain's Toby Roberts and Spain's Alberto Ginés López also topped the final route, placed second and third respectively due to count-back to the semi-final.

In women's, Slovenian superstar Janja Garnbret was the only athlete to top both qualification routes. A high point on the final route secured Garnbret her fifth consecutive Innsbruck lead World Cup gold. Italy's Laura Rogora placed second and Erin McNeice placed third.

Men						Women					
Rank	Name	Qualification		Semi-Final	Final	Rank	Name	Qualification		Semi-Final	Final
Rank	Name	R1	R2	Semi-Final	Final	Rank	Name	R1	R2	Semi-Final	Final
1st place, gold medalist(s)	(Japan) Neo Suzuki	TOP	44+	TOP	TOP	1st place, gold medalist(s)	(Slovenia) Janja Garnbret	TOP	TOP	44+	41
2nd place, silver medalist(s)	(United Kingdom) Toby Roberts	34+	44+	50+	TOP	2nd place, silver medalist(s)	(Italy) Laura Rogora	40+	44+	42+	33
3rd place, bronze medalist(s)	(Spain) Alberto Ginés López	38+	45+	49+	TOP	3rd place, bronze medalist(s)	(United Kingdom) Erin McNeice	40+	44+	42+	32+
4	(Japan) Satone Yoshida	36	45	46+	TOP	4	(Slovenia) Rosa Rekar	40+	38+	42+	31+
5	(Germany) Yannick Flohé	36+	38	45+	TOP	5	(United States) Anastasia Sanders	40+	44+	42+	30
6	(France) Max Bertone	34+	40+	50	40	6	(South Korea) Seo Chae-hyun	40+	44+	36+	30
7	(South Korea) Lee Dohyun	34+	45	45+	38+	7	(Belgium) Heloïse Doumont	35+	38+	37+	28+
8	(United States) Jesse Grupper	34+	36+	50+	33	8	(Slovenia) Lucka Rakovec	40+	44+	37+	19+

== Chamonix, France (July, 11-13) ==
88 men and 78 women attended the event.

In men's, last year's winner Colin Duffy made it into the final and placed fifth after an early qualification exit in Innsbruck. Japan's Sorato Anraku claimed the only top of the final, securing the win. After falling while trying to jump to the top on the final route, Spain's Alberto Ginés López had to settle for silver. Italy's Filip Schenk took third, his first World Cup podium finish.

In women's, South Korea's Seo Chae-hyun claimed the win, her second Chamonix lead World Cup gold since her first in 2019. USA's Anastasia Sanders topped both qualification routes and the semi-final route, but she finished lower than Seo on the final route and had to settle for silver. Great Britain's Erin McNeice took third.

Men						Women					
Rank	Name	Qualification		Semi-Final	Final	Rank	Name	Qualification		Semi-Final	Final
Rank	Name	R1	R2	Semi-Final	Final	Rank	Name	R1	R2	Semi-Final	Final
1st place, gold medalist(s)	(Japan) Sorato Anraku	TOP	47	37+	TOP	1st place, gold medalist(s)	(South Korea) Seo Chae-hyun	42+	40+	42	44+
2nd place, silver medalist(s)	(Spain) Alberto Ginés López	TOP	40+	39	43+	2nd place, silver medalist(s)	(United States) Anastasia Sanders	TOP	TOP	TOP	43+
3rd place, bronze medalist(s)	(Italy) Filip Schenk	35	30+	37+	43+	3rd place, bronze medalist(s)	(United Kingdom) Erin McNeice	39	40+	43+	42+
4	(Japan) Satone Yoshida	37+	TOP	36+	39+	4	(United States) Brooke Raboutou	41+	40+	38+	40+
5	(United States) Colin Duffy	35+	39+	37+	38+	5	(France) Camille Pouget	41+	39	39	34+
6	(Switzerland) Jonas Utelli	33	38	37	36	6	(France) Zélia Avezou	38+	40+	41+	34
7	(Slovenia) Luka Potočar	37+	46+	37	31	7	(Spain) Geila Macià Martín	39	40+	36+	23+
8	(Japan) Shion Omata	37+	39+	37+	29+	8	(Japan) Natsuki Tanii	36+	38+	35	13+

== Madrid, Spain (July, 18-19) ==
81 men and 70 women attended the event.

In men's South Korea's Lee Dohyun claimed his first lead World Cup win. Alberto Ginés López and Satone Yoshida placed second and third respectively.

In women's, USA's Anastasia Sanders topped the final route, securing her first lead World Cup win. Sanders became the first American woman to win both Lead and Boulder World Cup golds. Italy's Laura Rogora and USA's Brooke Raboutou placed second and third respectively.

Men						Women					
Rank	Name	Qualification		Semi-Final	Final	Rank	Name	Qualification		Semi-Final	Final
Rank	Name	R1	R2	Semi-Final	Final	Rank	Name	R1	R2	Semi-Final	Final
1st place, gold medalist(s)	(South Korea) Lee Dohyun	43+	39+	45+	40+	1st place, gold medalist(s)	(United States) Anastasia Sanders	39	TOP	TOP	TOP
2nd place, silver medalist(s)	(Spain) Alberto Ginés López	43+	TOP	46+	40	2nd place, silver medalist(s)	(Italy) Laura Rogora	TOP	TOP	46+	48+
3rd place, bronze medalist(s)	(Japan) Satone Yoshida	43+	TOP	47+	39+	3rd place, bronze medalist(s)	(United States) Brooke Raboutou	42+	TOP	43+	48+
4	(United States) Colin Duffy	42+	39+	43+	39+	4	(United Kingdom) Erin McNeice	TOP	47+	43	43+
5	(Japan) Sorato Anraku	43+	TOP	45+	39	5	(France) Manon Hily	42+	40+	40+	38+
6	(Japan) Shion Omata	43+	43+	45+	38+	6	(Slovenia) Rosa Rekar	42	45+	43+	15+
7	(Japan) Neo Suzuki	43+	TOP	46+	33	7	(South Korea) Seo Chae-hyun	TOP	TOP	46+	14+
8	(Czech Republic) Jakub Konecny	41+	39	43+	30+	8	(Belgium) Heloïse Doumont	42+	44	39+	14+

== Koper, Slovenia (September, 5-6) ==
70 men and 60 women attended the event.

In men's, Japan's Sorato Anraku claimed the gold medal. Spain's Alberto Ginés López placed second and Great Britain's Toby Roberts third. Alberto Ginés López won the 2025 lead season's champion title after never placing lower than third throughout the season.

In women's, 2-time Olympic champion Janja Garnbret timed out in the semi-final, resulting in a tie with Seo Chae-hyun going into the finals. In the final Garnbret secured the win, claiming her 31st gold medal in the lead World Cup competitions — overtaking South Korea's veteran Jain Kim's record of the most lead World Cup gold medals. Seo Chae-hyun placed second, which also left her in second place in the 2025 lead season's overall rankings. Italy's Laura Rogora placed third. Great Britain's Erin McNeice, the 2025 lead season's overall champion, finished in fourth place.

Men						Women					
Rank	Name	Qualification		Semi-Final	Final	Rank	Name	Qualification		Semi-Final	Final
Rank	Name	R1	R2	Semi-Final	Final	Rank	Name	R1	R2	Semi-Final	Final
1st place, gold medalist(s)	(Japan) Sorato Anraku	TOP	TOP	41+	48+	1st place, gold medalist(s)	(Slovenia) Janja Garnbret	TOP	TOP	48	47+
2nd place, silver medalist(s)	(Spain) Alberto Ginés López	36+	TOP	40+	47+	2nd place, silver medalist(s)	(South Korea) Seo Chae-hyun	TOP	TOP	48	38+
3rd place, bronze medalist(s)	(United Kingdom) Toby Roberts	TOP	TOP	40+	46+	3rd place, bronze medalist(s)	(Italy) Laura Rogora	TOP	48+	47	37+
4	(Japan) Satone Yoshida	TOP	TOP	38	45	4	(United Kingdom) Erin McNeice	TOP	46+	40+	33
5	(Austria) Jakob Schubert	TOP	TOP	39	43	5	(Slovenia) Lucka Rakovec	TOP	48+	39+	28+
6	(Indonesia) Putra Tri Ramadani	41	42+	40	40+	6	(Belgium) Heloïse Doumont	37+	39+	39+	28+
7	(Czech Republic) Adam Ondra	44+	38+	37	35+	7	(Slovenia) Rosa Rekar	35+	20	44+	26+
8	(Japan) Neo Suzuki	44	40+	38+	10+	8	(Slovenia) Lucija Tarkus	35+	45+	39+	13+
