= Bouldering at the 2024 IFSC Climbing World Cup =

- Location: Keqiao, China Salt Lake City, United States; Innsbruck, Austria; Prague, Czech Republic Seoul, South Korea
- Dates: 8 April – 6 October 2024

Champions
- Men: (Japan) Sorato Anraku
- Women: (United States) Natalia Grossman

The 2024 season of the IFSC Climbing World Cup was the 25th season of the competition. Bouldering competitions were held at five stops of the IFSC Climbing World Cup. The bouldering season began on April 8 at the World Cup in Keqiao, and concluded on October 6 with the World Cup in Seoul. At each stop a qualifying was held on the first day of the competition, and the semi-final and final rounds were conducted on the second day of the competition. The winners were awarded trophies, and the best three finishers received medals. At the end of the season an overall ranking was determined based upon points, which athletes were awarded for finishing in the top 40 of each individual event.

Natalia Grossman won the women's season title. The men's season title went to Sorato Anraku while Japan defended its title in the national teams competition.

== Overview ==
Date	Location	Routesetters*	Men	Women
April, 8-10	Keqiao, China	(Japan) **Tsukuru Hori**; (China) Ma Zida; (Spain) Sergio Verdasco	(Japan) Tomoa Narasaki	(Slovenia) Janja Garnbret
May, 3-5	Salt Lake City, United States	(Switzerland) **Manuel Hassler**; (France) Pierre Broyer; (Italy) Anna Borella	(Japan) Sorato Anraku	(United States) Natalia Grossman
June, 26-30	Innsbruck, Austria	(Japan) **Gen Hirashima**; (United Kingdom) Max Ayrton; (United States) Flannery Shay-Nemirow	(Japan) Sohta Amagasa	(Slovenia) Janja Garnbret
September, 20-22	Prague, Czech Republic	(Spain) **Sergio Verdasco**; (Switzerland) Manuel Hassler; (France) Maelys Agrapart	(South Korea) Lee Dohyun	(United States) Natalia Grossman
October, 2-6	Seoul, South Korea	(Japan) **Gen Hirashima**; (United Kingdom) Max Ayrton; (China) Cai Luyan	(South Korea) Lee Dohyun	(United States) Anastasia Sanders
**OVERALL WINNERS**			(Japan) **Sorato Anraku**	(United States) **Natalia Grossman**
**NATIONAL TEAM**			**Japan**	

* Chief routesetters are in bold.

== Overall ranking ==
The overall ranking is determined based upon points, which athletes are awarded for finishing in the top 80 of each individual event. The end-of-season standings are based on the sum of points earned from the five best finishes for each athlete. Results displayed (in brackets) are not counted. The national ranking is the sum of the points of that country's three best male and female athletes.

=== Men ===
The results of the ten most successful athletes of the Bouldering World Cup 2024:

Rank	Name	Points	Keqiao	Salt Lake City	Innsbruck	Prague	Seoul
1	(Japan) Sorato Anraku	3365	2. 805	1. 1000	3. 690	4. 610	14. 260
2	(Japan) Meichi Narasaki	2860	6. 495	2. 805	2. 805	14. 260	6. 495
3	(Japan) Tomoa Narasaki	2690	1. 1000	9. 380	8. 415	5. 545	10. 350
4	(Japan) Sohta Amagasa	2416	29. 52	4. 610	1. 1000	27. 64	3. 690
5	(United Kingdom) Toby Roberts	2365	4. 610	7. 455	4. 610	3. 690	-
6	(South Korea) Lee Dohyun	2280	13. 280	-	-	1. 1000	1. 1000
7	(United Kingdom) Maximillian Milne	1571.66	9. 351.66	-	-	8. 415	2. 805
8	(Japan) Ritsu Kayotani	1375	16. 220	-	6. 495	13. 280	9. 380
9	(South Korea) Jongwon Chon	1331.5	7. 455	-	33. 31.5	12. 300	5. 545
10	(France) Manuel Cornu	1323.5	31. 39.5	11. 312.5	43. 11.5	2. 805	20. 155
11	(Austria) Jakob Schubert	1242.5	8. 415	3. 690	21. 137.5	-	-
12	(Japan) Yuji Fujiwaki	1215	17. 205	15. 240	9. 380	16. 220	19. 170
13	(United Kingdom) Dayan Akhtar	1184	19. 170	20. 155	15. 240	47. 9	4. 610
14	(Slovenia) Anže Peharc	1121.66	9. 351.66	-	11. 325	15. 240	17. 205
15	(France) Sam Avezou	1110	5. 545	-	-	11. 325	15. 240
16	(United States) Colin Duffy	975	12. 300	8. 415	14. 260	-	-
17	(Austria) Jan-Luca Posch	942.16	9. 351.66	5. 545	31. 39.5	55. 6	-
18	(France) Thomas Lemagner	865	-	14. 260	13. 280	-	11. 325
19	(United States) Adam Shahar	786.5	-	35. 25.5	39. 16	7. 455	12. 290
20	(France) Mejdi Schalck	785	-	-	-	10. 350	7. 435

=== Women ===
The results of the ten most successful athletes of the Bouldering World Cup 2024:

Rank	Name	Points	Keqiao	Salt Lake City	Innsbruck	Prague	Seoul
1	(United States) Natalia Grossman	2610	-	1. 1000	-	1. 1000	4. 610
2	(Australia) Oceana Mackenzie	2405	10. 350	4. 610	12. 300	3. 690	7. 455
3	(Japan) Mao Nakamura	2262.5	11. 312.5*	6. 495	4. 610	6. 495	10. 350
4	(United States) Anastasia Sanders	2105	-	8. 415	3. 690	-	1. 1000
5	(Slovenia) Janja Garnbret	2000	1. 1000	-	1. 1000	-	-
6	(France) Zélia Avezou	1960	4. 610	-	-	5. 545	2. 805
7	(France) Naïlé Meignan	1875	-	3. 690	9. 380	2. 805	-
8	(Japan) Anon Matsufuji	1848	6. 495	10. 350	27. 68*	4. 610	11. 325
9	(United Kingdom) Erin McNeice	1572.5	5. 545	-	-	10. 337.5	3. 690
10	(France) Oriane Bertone	1260	-	2. 805	7. 455	-	-
11	(Austria) Jessica Pilz	1240	17. 195	14. 260	5. 545	-	15. 240
12	(Japan) Melody Sekikawa	1195	-	11. 325	10. 350	15. 240	12. 280
13	(Slovenia) Jennifer Eucharia Buckley	1185	-	-	2. 805	9. 380	-
14	(Germany) Anna Maria Apel	1185	16. 220	26. 84	8. 415	8. 415	-
15	(France) Agathe Calliet	1185	-	12. 300	14. 260	-	6. 495
16	(Slovenia) Katja Debevec	1025	-	13. 280	13. 280	18. 185	12. 280
17	(China) Luo Zhilu	970	3. 690	-	-	-	12. 280
18	(Canada) Madison Richardson	948.16	7. 455	16. 220	29. 48.66	31. 39.5	18. 185
19	(Italy) Camilla Moroni	948.16	2. 805	-	-	-	21. 137.5
20	(South Korea) Seo Chae-hyun	922	14. 260	-	32. 37	7. 455	19. 170

* = Joint place with another athlete

=== National Teams ===
The results of the ten most successful countries of the Bouldering World Cup 2025:

Country names as used by the IFSC

Rank	Name	Points	Keqiao	Salt Lake City	Innsbruck	Prague	Seoul
1	Japan	16391.66	3445	3585	3676.66	2780	2905
2	France	11537.5	1510	2453	1869.5	3055	2650
3	United States	7936.99	535	2632	1013.33	1566.66	2190
4	Slovenia	7110.66	1571	861	2778	1142.5	758.16
5	United Kingdom	7022.33	1704	863	887.5	1462.83	2105
6	(South Korea) Korea	5178.5	1135	-	258.5	1783	2002
7	Germany	4843.41	720	1403	1290.55	1182.5	247.25
8	Austria	4768.66	1399	1574	1136.5	387.66	271.5
9	Australia	2799.16	386	900	313.33	707	492.83
10	Italy	3264.18	1098	20	452.66	394	602.32

== Keqiao, China (8-10 April) ==
=== Women ===
59 athletes attended the World Cup in Keqiao. Janja Garnbret won in front of Italy's Camilla Moroni as the only athlete to get 4 tops in the final, flashing three of the four boulders. China's Luo Zhilu finished third. Moroni and Luo claimed their first World Cup medals.

Rank	Name	Score
1	(Slovenia) Janja Garnbret	4T4z 5 5
2	(Italy) Camilla Moroni	2T3z 10 13
3	(China) Luo Zhilu	2T2z 2 2
4	(France) Zélia Avezou	1T3z 5 15
5	(United Kingdom) Erin McNeice	1T2z 1 6
6	(Japan) Anon Matsufuji	1T2z 2 4

=== Men ===
67 athletes attended the World Cup in Keqiao. The men's bouldering results were based on semifinal standings after the qualification round were delayed due to heavy rainfall. Last year's overall World Cup winner Sorato Anraku placed second in the competition, behind compatriot Tomoa Narasaki being the only two athletes to claim 2 tops and 4 zones — separated only by attempts. Belgium's Hannes Van Duysen rounded out the podium in third.

Rank	Name	Score
1	(Japan) Tomoa Narasaki	2T4z 2 4
2	(Japan) Sorato Anraku	2T4z 4 8
3	(Belgium) Hannes Van Duysen	2T3z 4 4
4	(United Kingdom) Toby Roberts	2T3z 4 6
5	(France) Sam Avezou	2T3z 5 6
6	(Japan) Meichi Narasaki	2T2z 3 3

== Salt Lake City, United States (3-5 May) ==
=== Women ===
55 athletes attended the World Cup in Salt Lake City. In the final, USA's Natalia Grossman flashed three boulders, winning the competition — her sixth World Cup gold in Salt Lake City. France's Oriane Bertone took silver and compatriot Naïlé Meignan bronze, her first World Cup medal.

Rank	Name	Score
1	(United States) Natalia Grossman	3T4z 3 10
2	(France) Oriane Bertone	3T4z 6 6
3	(France) Naïlé Meignan	3T4z 6 13
4	(Australia) Oceania Mackenzie	2T4z 2 7
5	(United States) Brooke Raboutou	2T3z 2 7
6	(Japan) Mao Nakamura	2T3z 4 5

=== Men ===
62 athletes attended the World Cup in Salt Lake City. Last year's winner Tomoa Narasaki failed to advance past the semi-final. In the final, Sorato Anraku won the competition being the only athlete to top 3 of the 4 boulders. Meichi Narasaki came in second and Austrian veteran Jakob Schubert returned to the boulder World Cup podium in third, his first since 2021.

Rank	Name	Score
1	(Japan) Sorato Anraku	3T4z 11 11
2	(Japan) Meichi Narasaki	1T4z 1 13
3	(Austria) Jakob Schubert	1T4z 7 9
4	(Japan) Sohta Amagasa	1T4z 7 12
5	(Austria) Jan-Luca Posch	1T3z 3 12
6	(Germany) Yannick Flohé	1T2z 3 4

== Innsbruck, Austria (26-30 June) ==
=== Women ===
84 athletes attended the World Cup in Innsbruck. Topping all 4 boulders in the final, Olympic champion Janja Garnbret finished ahead of compatriot Jennifer Eucharia Buckley to win the competition. USA's Anastasia Sanders finished third, claiming her first World Cup podium finish.

Rank	Name	Score
1	(Slovenia) Janja Garnbret	4T4z 10 9
2	(Slovenia) Jennifer Eucharia Buckley	3T3z 11 8
3	(United States) Anastasia Sanders	3T3z 12 9
4	(Japan) Mao Nakamura	2T2z 4 2
5	(Austria) Jessica Pilz	1T4z 6 13
6	(France) Fanny Gibert	0T2z 0 5

=== Men ===
97 athletes attended the World Cup in Innsbruck. Team Japan filled four of the 6 spots in the men's final. Japan's Sohta Amagasa won his first World Cup, using fewer attempts on the three boulders compared to Meichi Narasaki who finished second. Sorato Anraku, who was leading the way in the first half of the final, finished third after failing to top the final boulder.

Rank	Name	Score
1	(Japan) Sohta Amagasa	3T3z 8 7
2	(Japan) Meichi Narasaki	3T3z 11 7
3	(Japan) Sorato Anraku	2T3z 2 3
4	(United Kingdom) Toby Roberts	2T2z 4 4
5	(Germany) Elias Arriagada Krüger	1T3z 8 11
6	(Japan) Ritsu Kayotani	0T3z 0 24

== Prague, Czech Republic (20-22 September) ==
=== Women ===
59 athletes attended the World Cup in Prague. In the final, USA's Natalia Grossman was the only athlete to top the final boulder, finishing with three tops and four zones. France's Naïlé Maignan secured second place with two tops and zone. Australian Oceania Mackenzie took third with two tops and three zones.

Rank	Name	Score
1	(United States) Natalia Grossman	3T4z 17 18
2	(France) Naïlé Meignan	2T4z 8 11
3	(Australia) Oceania Mackenzie	2T3z 8 6
4	(Japan) Anon Matsufuji	2T3z 10 14
5	(United Kingdom) Zélia Avezou	1T2z 1 10
6	(Japan) Mao Nakamura	0T3z 0 8

=== Men ===
81 athletes attended the World Cup in Prague. South Korean Lee Dohyun won the competition, making it back-to-back World Cup golds in Prague. France's Manuel Cornu took silver, his first World Cup podium since 2019. Olympic champion Toby Roberts finished in third.

Rank	Name	Score
1	(South Korea) Lee Dohyun	2T4z 3 19
2	(France) Manuel Cornu	2T3z 5 10
3	(United Kingdom) Toby Roberts	2T2z 6 2
4	(Japan) Sorato Anraku	1T4z 1 9
5	(Japan) Tomoa Narasaki	1T4z 4 10
6	(Czech Republic) Adam Ondra	1T3z 1 7

== Seoul, South Korea (2-6 October) ==
=== Women ===
67 athletes attended the World Cup in Seoul. USA's Anastasia Sanders secured her first World Cup win over France's Zélia Avezou and Great Britain's Erin McNeice. Last year's winner Miho Nonaka placed 5th and Prague winner Natalia Grossman placed fourth.

Rank	Name	Score
1	(United States) Anastasia Sanders	3T4z 7 13
2	(France) Zélia Avezou	3T4z 9 7
3	(United Kingdom) Erin McNeice	2T4z 4 5
4	(United States) Natalia Grossman	2T4z 5 5
5	(Japan) Miho Nonaka	2T4z 9 8
6	(France) Agathe Calliet	0T3z 0 10

=== Men ===
59 athletes attended the World Cup in Seoul. South Korea's Lee Dohyun won the gold ahead of Maximillian Milne by the narrowest of margins — 1 attempt to zone — denying the Brit his first World Cup win. Japan's Sohta Amagasa took third with 4 zones.

Rank	Name	Score
1	(South Korea) Lee Dohyun	2T4z 4 4
2	(United Kingdom) Maximillian Milne	2T4z 4 5
3	(Japan) Sohta Amagasa	0T4z 0 7
4	(United Kingdom) Dayan Akhtar	0T3z 0 4
5	(South Korea) Chon Jong-won	0T3z 0 5
6	(Japan) Meichi Narasaki	0T3z 0 7
