= Annie Sanders =

American rock climber

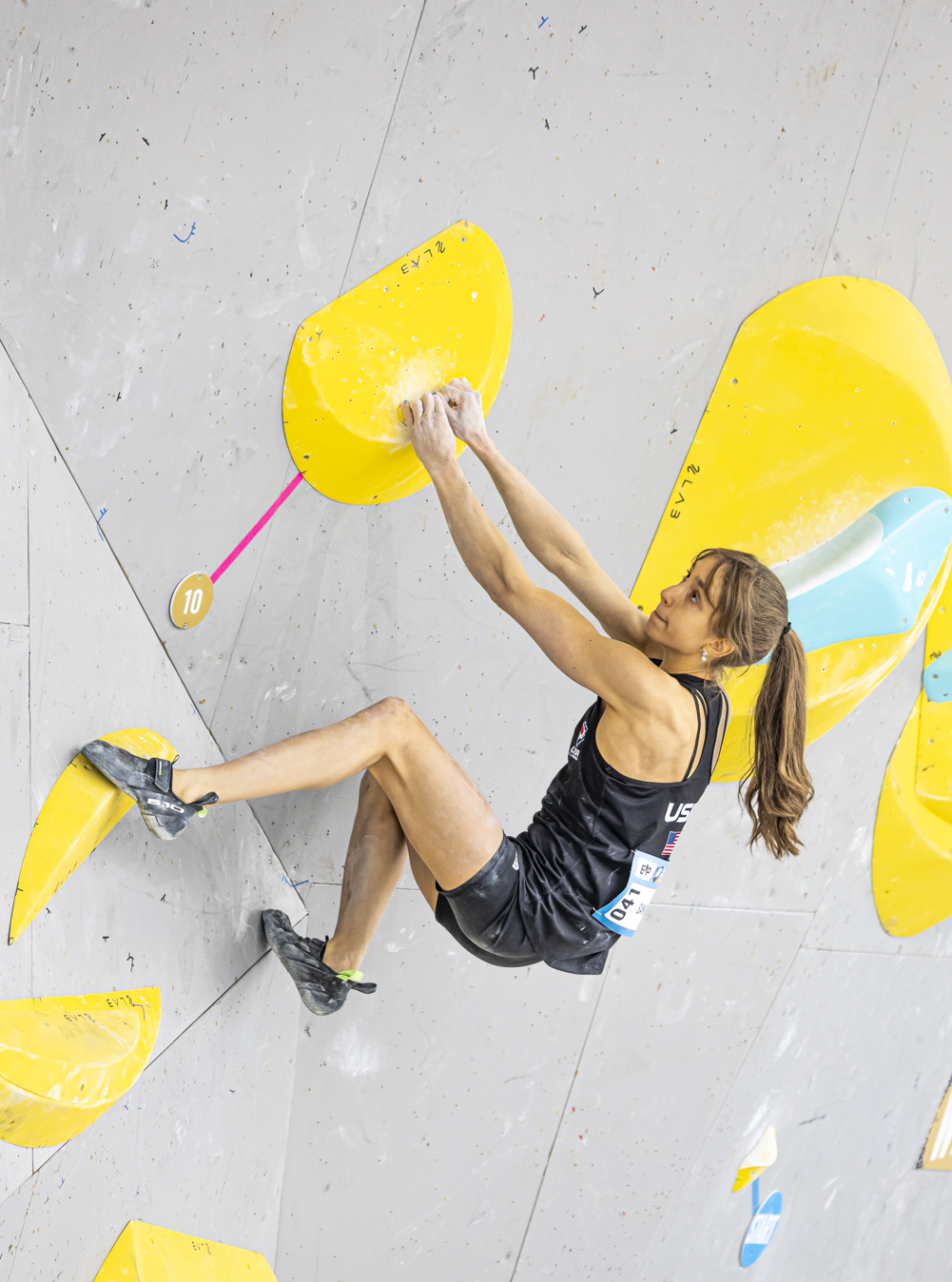
- Sanders at 2025 Prague World Cup

Personal information
- Nationality: American
- Born: July 22, 2007 (age 19) Fort Worth, Texas
- Height: 162 cm (5 ft 4 in)

Climbing career
- Type of climber: Competition climbing; Sport climbing; Bouldering
- Highest grade: Redpoint: 5.14a (8b+); Onsight/Flash: 5.14a (8b+) (flash)
Medal record
Event / 1st / 2nd / 3rd; World Cup / 8 / 3 / 6
Women's competition climbing
Representing United States
World Cup (Overall)
Winner	2026	Lead
Third place	2026	Bouldering
World Cup
Gold medal – first place	Seoul 2024	Bouldering
Gold medal – first place	Keqiao 2025	Bouldering
Gold medal – first place	Madrid 2025	Lead
Gold medal – first place	Wujiang 2026	Lead
Gold medal – first place	Prague 2026	Lead
Gold medal – first place	Prague 2026	Bouldering
Gold medal – first place	Innsbruck 2026	Bouldering
Gold medal – first place	Chamonix 2026	Lead
Silver medal – second place	Bern 2025	Bouldering
Silver medal – second place	Chamonix 2025	Lead
Silver medal – second place	Innsbruck 2026	Lead
Bronze medal – third place	Innsbruck 2024	Bouldering
Bronze medal – third place	Koper 2024	Lead
Bronze medal – third place	Seoul 2024	Lead
Bronze medal – third place	Wujiang 2025	Lead
Bronze medal – third place	Salt Lake City 2025	Bouldering
Bronze medal – third place	Bern 2026	Bouldering

Anastasia "Annie" Sanders (born July 22, 2007) is an American rock climber who specialises in competition climbing, with an emphasis on the bouldering, lead, and combined disciplines. She came to international attention at the 2021 IFSC Climbing World Youth Championships in Voronezh, where she won gold in all three Youth B U16 events before the age of 15. In the same year, she flashed the sport climbing route Omaha Beach 5.14a (8b+) at the Red River Gorge, a climbing route considered an extreme standard of difficulty in outdoor sport climbing.

In 2025, Sanders became the first American woman to win IFSC World Cup titles in both Lead and Bouldering. The Olympics has described her as a “teenage sensation” in the sport.

== Early life ==
Sanders was born in Fort Worth, Texas, to Jack Sanders and Olya Sanders, introducing her to climbing before she could walk at 10 months old.

By the time she entered high school, Sanders balanced a rigorous schedule of AP classes with intensive training and competitions. Before the age of 16, Sanders held four World Youth World Championship wins, and six National Youth Championship wins.

A 2025 NBC Dallas, Fort Worth profile highlighted how she structures her days around schoolwork, 10 hours of daily training, managing travel, rest, and competition in preparation for the 2028 Olympics.

== Competition climbing career ==
Sanders began her senior debut in 2023, reaching finals in Salt Lake City (4th) and Seoul (5th) during the 2023 IFSC Climbing World Cup season. She claimed her first Boulder World Cup victory in Seoul with three tops and four zones in finals. That season included podium finishes in Lead, with a bronze medal in Koper, and Seoul, finishing with a 4th-place overall in World Climbing Boulder World Cup standings.

=== National titles ===
Her 2022 and 2024 national titles were earned during the full USA Climbing National Championships and National Team Trials. Sanders was only 15 years old when she claimed both elite bouldering and lead titles in 2024, making her one of the youngest American climbers to achieve this feat.

- Three-time U.S. national bouldering champion – 2022 (The Spot Boulder Final), 2023 (Mesa Rim Final), 2024 (Sportrock Team Trials Final)
- Two-time U.S. national lead climbing champion – 2022 (G-1 Lead Final), 2024 (Sportrock Team Trials Final)
- U.S. national combined youth champion – 2021 (IFSC Youth World Championships, Voronezh)

=== 2021 World Cup Season ===
In 2021, Sanders won gold medals in the bouldering, lead, and combined bouldering and lead events at the IFSC Climbing World Youth Championships.

=== 2022 World Cup Season ===
In 2022, Sanders repeated as Youth World Champion in bouldering. She won the USA Climbing National Championships in both bouldering and lead, her first senior competition at age 15.

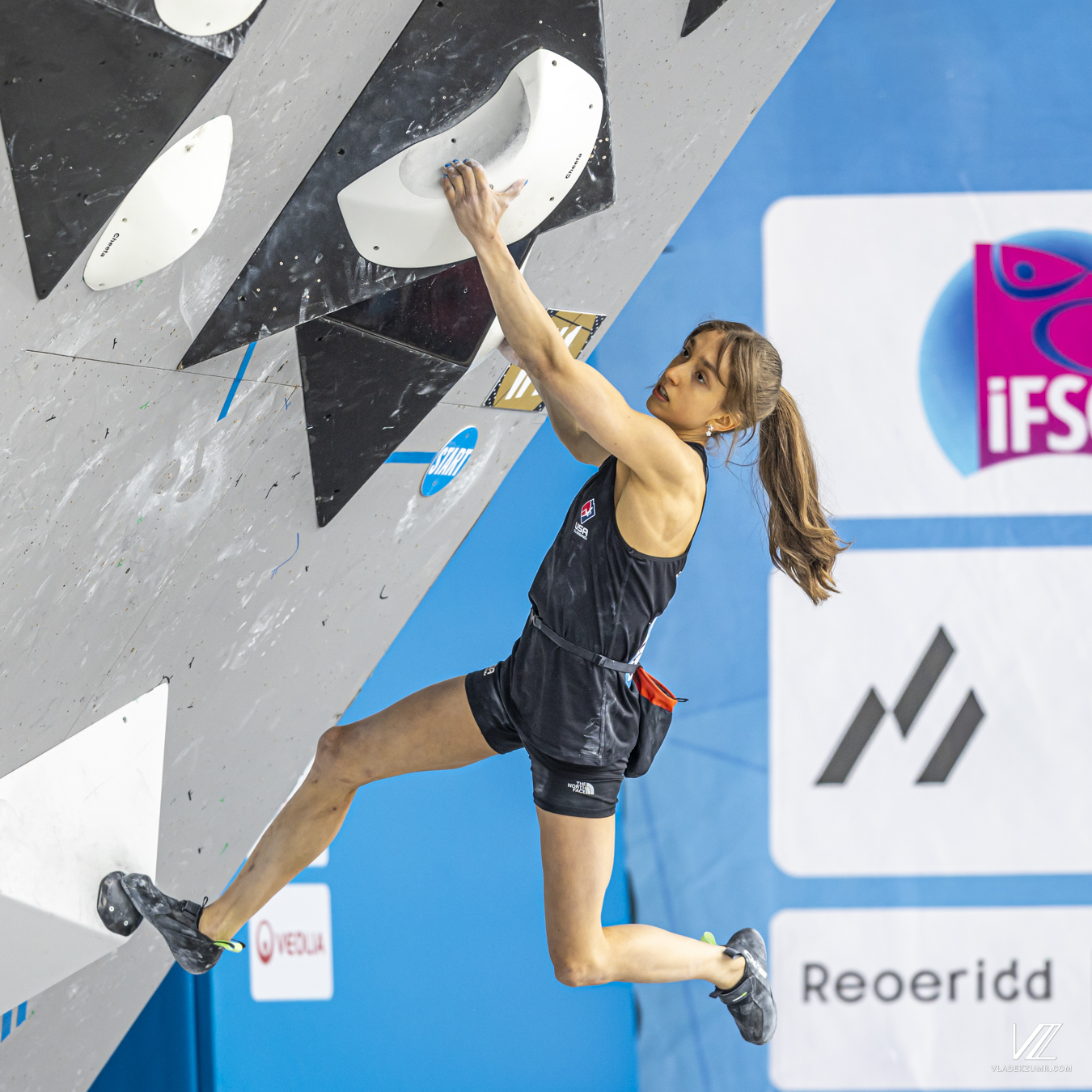
Sanders in 2025 at a IFSC World Cup Prague

=== 2023 World Cup Season ===
In 2023, at the 2023 USA Climbing National Team Trials, Sanders won in the bouldering, lead and combined events, thus qualifying to compete as part of the United States national team on the international senior circuit at age 15-16. Sanders reached two bouldering finals during the 2023 IFSC Climbing World Cup season, placing 4th in Salt Lake City and 5th in the Seoul, and reached the final of the combined bouldering and lead event at the 2023 IFSC Climbing World Championships, where she finished in eighth place.

=== 2024 World Cup Season ===
In 2024, Sanders won her first World Cup medals, collecting one gold medal and one bronze medal in the Boulder World Cup and two bronze medals in the Lead World Cup.

=== 2025 World Cup Season ===
At the IFSC World Cup Keqiao 2025 Sanders won her first Boulder World Cup event, becoming the fifth American woman to win multiple Boulder World Cups.

She followed up with another podium at the IFSC World Cup Salt Lake 2025, where Sanders secured bronze. In finals, Sanders tied with gold medalist Mao Nakamura, and silver medalist Zélia Avezou with a score of 70.0 points, only separated by their performances from semi-finals.

Her early 2025 season podium run came to an end at the IFSC World Cup Prague 2025, where Sanders finished 12th overall, with a score of 44.1.

As the boulder season progressed, Sanders secured a spot into finals with a three-way tie for sixth place at the IFSC World Cup 2025 in Bern. Her buzzer beater on semis W4 put her above teammate Kyra Condie, securing her a spot in finals, where she took silver behind gold medalist, Erin McNeice.

At the IFSC Climbing World Cup Innsbruck 2025, Sanders topped three boulders, finishing first in the women's Boulder semi-final with 84.5 points.

2025 was her best Boulder cup season career finish, placing third with 3,290 points at the end of the World Climbing Boulder Cup Season.

At the 2025 IFSC Lead World Cup in Madrid, she won her first gold medal in Lead, topping the final route and finishing ahead of Laura Rogora and Brooke Raboutou. The result made her the first American woman to win World Cup events in both Lead and Boulder.

== World Cup Results ==
=== IFSC World Cup Medals ===
Bouldering

Season	Gold	Silver	Bronze	Total
2024	1		1	2
2025	1	1	1	3
2026	2		1	3
Total	4	1	3	8

Lead

Season	Gold	Silver	Bronze	Total
2024			2	2
2025	1	1	1	3
2026	3	1		4
Total	4	2	3	9

=== IFSC World Cup Podiums ===
Year	Event	City	Discipline	Rank
2026	World Climbing Series	Chamonix, France	Lead	1st
2026	World Climbing Series	Innsbruck, Austria	Lead	2nd
2026	World Climbing Series	Innsbruck, Austria	Boulder	1st
2026	World Climbing Series	Prague, Czechia	Lead	1st
2026	World Climbing Series	Prague, Czechia	Boulder	1st
2026	World Climbing Series	Bern, Switzerland	Boulder	3rd
2026	World Climbing Series	Wujiang, China	Lead	1st
2025	IFSC World Cup	Madrid, Spain	Lead	1st
2025	IFSC World Cup	Chamonix, France	Lead	2nd
2025	IFSC World Cup	Bern, Switzerland	Boulder	2nd
2025	IFSC World Cup	Salt Lake City, USA	Boulder	3rd
2025	IFSC World Cup	Wujiang, CHN	Lead	3rd
2025	IFSC World Cup	Keqiao, CHN	Boulder	1st
2024	IFSC World Cup	Seoul	Boulder	1st
2024	IFSC World Cup	Seoul	Lead	3rd
2024	IFSC World Cup	Koper	Lead	3rd
2024	IFSC World Cup	Innsbruck	Boulder	3rd

== Rankings ==
=== World Cup ===
Discipline	2023	2024	2025
Lead	41	6	4
Boulder	9	4	3

=== World Championships ===
Discipline	Bern 2023	Seoul 2025
Lead	13	5
Boulder	14	7
Boulder & Lead	8	-

=== Youth World Championships ===
Discipline	2021 Youth B	2022 Youth B
Lead	1	17
Boulder	1	1
Combined	1	-

== Notable ascents ==
Sanders has made several outdoor ascents of sport climbing routes at grade 5.13 (7c+) or higher in the Red River Gorge in Kentucky, including a flash of Omaha Beach at 5.14a (8b+), in October 2021.

=== Redpointed routes ===
5.14a (8b+)

- Omaha Beach, Red River Gorge, flashed, October 2021
- God's Own Throne, Red River Gorge, October 2020

5.13c (8a+)

- The Madness, Red River Gorge, October 2021

== Personal life ==
Sanders attends an online learning program within the Grapevine–Colleyville Independent School District, which provides the flexibility needed to pursue her elite climbing career while continuing her education. The arrangement has allowed her to travel for international competitions and USA Climbing events, including senior-level tournaments, while maintaining her academic progress.
