= 2025 IFSC Climbing World Championships =

Biennial competition climbing event

- Venue: KSPO Dome
- Location: Seoul, South Korea
- Date: 21–28 September 2025
- Website: IFSC WC Seoul 2025

The 2025 IFSC Climbing World Championships, the 19th edition, was held in Seoul, South Korea, from 21 to 28 September 2025. The competition climbing championships consisted of lead, speed, and bouldering, along with the paraclimbing event.

== Medalists ==
Event	Gold	Silver	Bronze
Men's Lead	Lee Do-hyun (KOR)	Satone Yoshida (JPN)	Taisei Homma (JPN)
Men's Bouldering	Sorato Anraku (JPN)	Mejdi Schalck (FRA)	Lee Do-hyun (KOR)
Men's Speed	Long Jianguo (CHN)	Leander Carmanns (GER)	Zach Hammer (USA)
Women's Lead	Janja Garnbret (SLO)	Rosa Rekar (SLO)	Seo Chae-hyun (KOR)
Women's Bouldering	Janja Garnbret (SLO)	Oriane Bertone (FRA)	Melina Costanza (USA)
Women's Speed	Aleksandra Mirosław (POL)	Deng Lijuan (CHN)	Zhou Yafei (CHN)

== Medal table ==
* Host nation (South Korea)

Rank	Nation	Gold	Silver	Bronze	Total
1	Slovenia	2	1	0	3
2	China	1	1	1	3
2	Japan	1	1	1	3
4	South Korea*	1	0	2	3
5	Poland	1	0	0	1
6	France	0	2	0	2
7	Germany	0	1	0	1
8	United States	0	0	2	2
Totals (8 entries)		6	6	6	18

== Lead ==
=== Men ===
Rank	Name	Qualification					Semi-Final	Final
Rank	Name	Route 1		Route 2		Points	Semi-Final	Final
Rank	Name	Score	Rank	Score	Rank	Points	Semi-Final	Final
1	(South Korea) Lee Do-hyun	34+	7	42+	7	7.48	48+	43+
2	(Japan) Satone Yoshida	TOP	1	45+	5	3.54	46+	43+
3	(Japan) Taisei Homma	28+	9	42	10	10.99	47	42+
4	(Spain) Alberto Ginés	TOP	1	TOP	1	2.5	46	42+
5	(Japan) Neo Suzuki	38+	5	TOP	1	3.54	46	39+
6	(France) Sam Avezou	TOP	1	42	10	5.12	48+	34+
7	(Austria) Jakob Schubert	28+	9	44	6	8.31	47+	34
8	(Italy) Giovanni Placci	24+	32	42+	7	16.49	46+	30+

=== Women ===
Rank	Name	Qualification					Semi-Final	Final
Rank	Name	Route 1		Route 2		Points	Semi-Final	Final
Rank	Name	Score	Rank	Score	Rank	Points	Semi-Final	Final
1	(Slovenia) Janja Garnbret	TOP	1	TOP	1	1.22	51+	TOP
2	(Slovenia) Rosa Rekar	28+	15	41	3	8.94	32+	45
3	(South Korea) Seo Chae-hyun	44+	2	39	12	6.0	47+	44+
4	(United Kingdom) Erin McNeice	44+	2	TOP	1	2.12	41	44
5	(United States) Anastasia Sanders	44+	2	41	3	3.87	39+	42+
6	(France) Zélia Avezou	43	6	41	3	5.48	32	35+
7	(Slovenia) Lučka Rakovec	30+	9	32+	16	13.67	39+	30
8	(Austria) Flora Oblasser	29	14	31+	20	17.15	32+	29+

== Bouldering ==
=== Men ===
Rank	Name	Qualification	Semi-Final	Final
1	(Japan) Sorato Anraku	94.9	99.2	99.2
2	(France) Mejdi Schalck	70.0	84.2	84.5
3	(South Korea) Lee Do-hyun	80.0	84.8	84.2
4	(Japan) Tomoa Narasaki	79.7	69.8	59.7
5	(Japan) Meichi Narasaki	94.4	69.4	44.8
6	(Austria) Jan-Luca Posch	69.9	84.3	29.7
7	(Germany) Thorben Perry Bloem	64.8	69.6	29.0
8	(United Kingdom) Jack MacDougall	79.8	69.7	19.8

=== Women ===
Rank	Name	Qualification	Semi-Final	Final
1	(Slovenia) Janja Garnbret	124.6	84.3	99.5
2	(France) Oriane Bertone	124.6	69.6	85.0
3	(United States) Melina Costanza	84.8	69.5	59.8
4	(United Kingdom) Erin McNeice	94.5	84.6	54.8
5	(Slovenia) Jennifer Eucharia Buckley	84.6	69.2	44.5
6	(Germany) Anna Maria Apel	94.0	68.1	44.0
7	(United States) Anastasia Sanders	109.7	84.6	39.3
8	(Israel) Ayala Kerem	99.1	69.4	29.6

== Speed ==
=== Men ===
Final bracket

Round of 16
1 (United States) Zach Hammer	5.01
16 (Japan) Shuto Fujino	6.71
8 (China) Wu Peng	5.18
9 (France) Guillaume Moro	7.41
4 (Ukraine) Yaroslav Tkach	4.99
13 (Germany) Leander Carmanns	4.86
5 (United States) Michael Hom	5.08
12 (China) Li Xu	5.14
2 (United States) Samuel Watson	4.92
15 (Kazakhstan) Amir Maimuratov	FLL
7 (Iran) Reza Alipour	5.08
10 (China) Chu Shouhong	6.40
3 (China) Long Jianguo	4.93
14 (Ukraine) Hryhorii Ilchyshyn	4.97
6 (Italy) Matteo Zurloni	5.05
11 (Spain) Erik Noya	5.04

Quarterfinals
(United States) Zach Hammer	4.99
(China) Wu Peng	5.04
(Germany) Leander Carmanns	4.94
(United States) Michael Hom	4.98
(United States) Samuel Watson	FLL
(Iran) Reza Alipour	4.95
(China) Long Jianguo	4.91
(Spain) Erik Noya	5.04

Semifinals
(United States) Zach Hammer	FLL
(Germany) Leander Carmanns	5.08
(Iran) Reza Alipour	4.93
(China) Long Jianguo	4.86

Final
(Germany) Leander Carmanns	4.99
(China) Long Jianguo	4.80
Third place
(United States) Zach Hammer	4.93
(Iran) Reza Alipour	4.94

=== Women ===
Final bracket

Round of 16
1 (Poland) Aleksandra Mirosław	6.36
16 (Japan) Ren Koyamatsu	FLL
8 (United States) Isis Rothfork	8.00
9 (China) Zhang Shaoqin	6.99
4 (China) Zhou Yafei	6.55
13 (Spain) Carla Martínez	7.13
5 (Poland) Natalia Kałucka	6.75
12 (Spain) Leslie Romero	6.90
2 (China) Deng Lijuan	6.67
15 (United States) Kelly Piper	7.08
7 (China) Zhang Mengli	6.73
10 (France) Capucine Viglione	7.00
3 (South Korea) Jeong Ji-min	6.55
14 (China) Meng Shixue	6.83
6 (China) Qin Yumei	6.81
11 (Italy) Beatrice Colli	6.89

Quarterfinals
(Poland) Aleksandra Mirosław	6.31
(China) Zhang Shaoqin	6.95
(China) Zhou Yafei	6.44
(Poland) Natalia Kałucka	6.56
(China) Deng Lijuan	6.46
(China) Zhang Mengli	6.75
(South Korea) Jeong Ji-min	6.36
(China) Qin Yumei	6.63

Semifinals
(Poland) Aleksandra Mirosław	6.20
(China) Zhou Yafei	6.53
(China) Deng Lijuan	6.42
(South Korea) Jeong Ji-min	8.00

Final
(Poland) Aleksandra Mirosław	6.03
(China) Deng Lijuan	6.22
Third place
(China) Zhou Yafei	6.34
(South Korea) Jeong Ji-min	6.38

== See also ==
- 2025 IFSC Climbing World Cup
