= Aleksandra Kałucka =

Polish speed climber

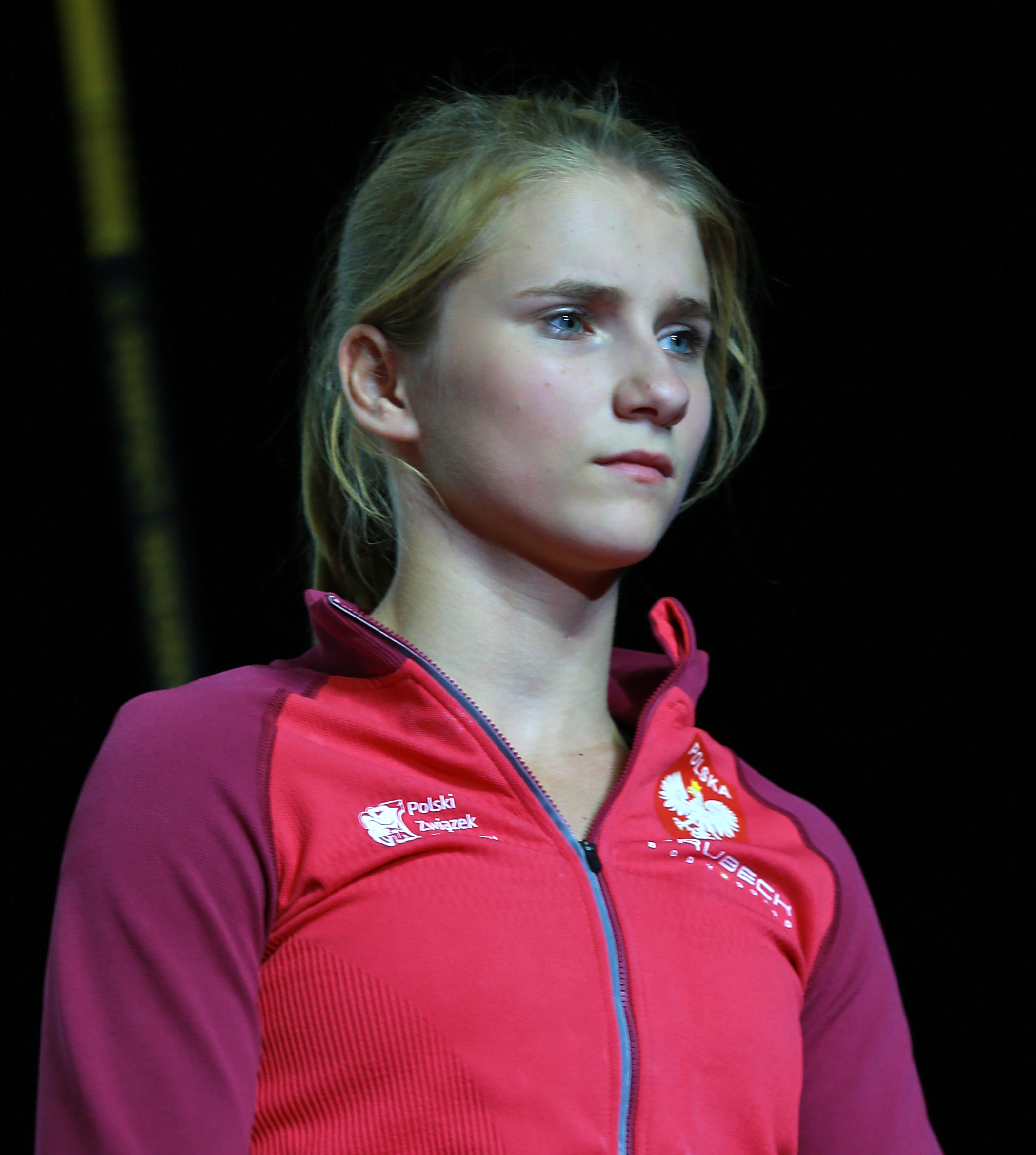
- Kałucka in 2018

Personal information
- Nickname: Ola
- Born: 25 December 2001 (age 24) Tarnów, Poland
- Home town: Tarnów, Poland
- Years active: 2015–present
- Height: 164 cm (5 ft 5 in)

Sport
- Country: Poland
- Sport: Competition speed climbing
- Club: AZS ANS Tarnów
- Coached by: Tomasz Mazur
Medal record
Women's competition climbing
Representing Poland
Olympic Games
Bronze medal – third place	2024 Paris	Speed
European Championships
Silver medal – second place	2022 Munich	Speed

Aleksandra Kałucka (born 25 December 2001) is a Polish competition climber who specializes in competition speed climbing. She won the bronze medal at the 2024 Summer Olympics in the speed climbing event and is a European Championships silver medallist. She is the twin sister of fellow speed climber Natalia Kałucka.

== Career ==
Kałucka participated at the 2022 IFSC Climbing European Championships, being awarded the silver medal in the women's speed event.

Kałucka competed in speed climbing at the 2024 Summer Olympics. She won her run against Zhou Yafei of China in the quarterfinals and then she lost to her teammate Aleksandra Mirosław despite setting a new personal best time of 6.34. In the bronze medal contest she defeated Indonesia's Rajiah Sallsabillah and finished the competition in the third place.

== Achievements ==
=== Olympic Games ===
Discipline	2024
Speed	3

=== World championships ===
Discipline	2018	2019	2021	2023
Speed	4	5	10	4
Bouldering	108	63	—	—
Lead	73	64	—	—
Combined	25	28	—	—

=== World Cup ===
Discipline	2018	2019	2021	2022	2023	2024
Speed	18	7	—	1	6	6
Combined	—	25	—	—	—	

=== European championships ===
Discipline	2019	2020	2022
Speed	4	4	2
Bouldering	33	19	—
Lead	—	28	—
Combined	—	10	—
