= 2022 IFSC Climbing European Championships =

Climbing championships

- Königsplatz, Munich was held the competition
- Venue: Königsplatz
- Location: Munich, Germany
- Date: 11 – 18 August 2022
- Website: ifsc-climbing.org

The 2022 IFSC Climbing European Championships, the 14th edition, was held in Munich, Germany from 11 to 18 August 2022 as part of 2022 European Championships. The competition climbing event consisted of lead, speed, bouldering, and combined events.

== Medal summary ==
Event	Gold	Silver	Bronze
Men's boulder	Nicolai Uznik; Austria	Sam Avezou; France	Adam Ondra; Czech Republic
Men's lead	Adam Ondra; Czech Republic	Luka Potočar; Slovenia	Alberto Ginés López; Spain
Men's speed	Danyil Boldyrev; Ukraine	Marcin Dzieński; Poland	Guillaume Moro; France
Men's combined (boulder & lead)	Jakob Schubert; Austria	Adam Ondra; Czech Republic	Alberto Ginés López; Spain
Women's boulder	Janja Garnbret; Slovenia	Hannah Meul; Germany	Oriane Bertone; France
Women's lead	Janja Garnbret; Slovenia	Jessica Pilz; Austria	Manon Hily; France
Women's speed	Aleksandra Mirosław; Poland	Aleksandra Kałucka; Poland	Natalia Kałucka; Poland
Women's combined (boulder & lead)	Janja Garnbret; Slovenia	Mia Krampl; Slovenia	Jessica Pilz; Austria

== Medal table ==
* Host nation (Germany)

Rank	Nation	Gold	Silver	Bronze	Total
1	Slovenia (SLO)	3	2	0	5
2	Austria (AUT)	2	1	1	4
3	Poland (POL)	1	2	1	4
4	Czech Republic (CZE)	1	1	1	3
5	Ukraine (UKR)	1	0	0	1
6	France (FRA)	0	1	3	4
7	Germany (GER)*	0	1	0	1
8	Spain (ESP)	0	0	2	2
Totals (8 entries)		8	8	8	24
