= Laura Rogora =

Italian rock climber (born 2001)

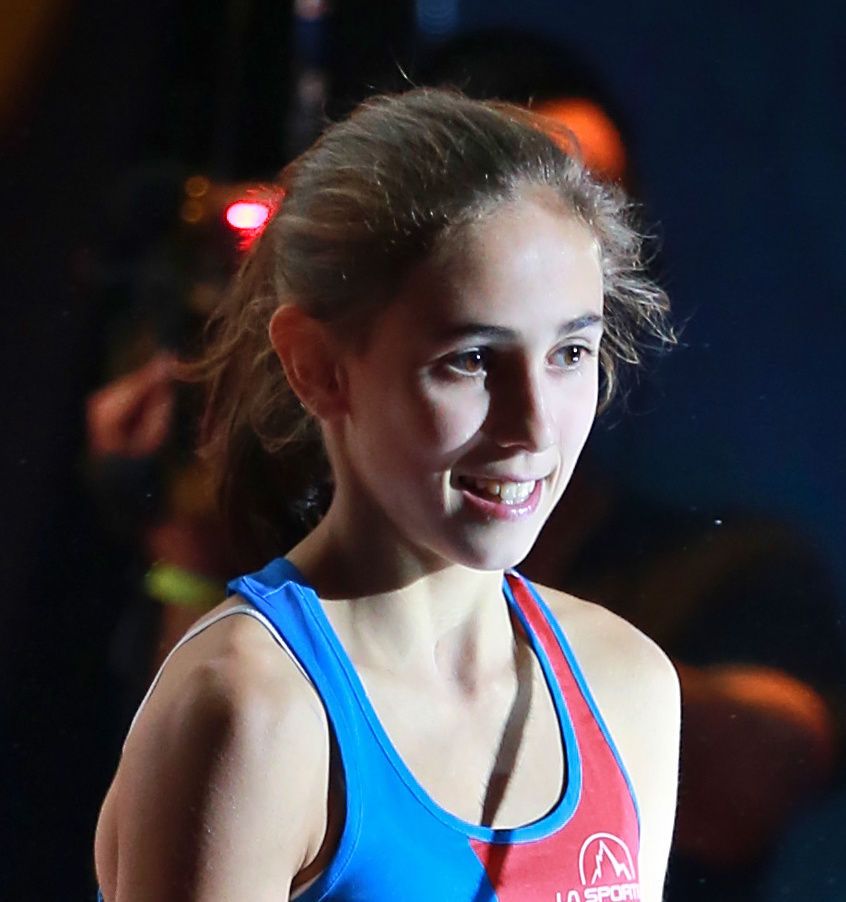

Personal information
- Nationality: Italian
- Born: April 28, 2001 (age 25) Rome, Italy
- Occupation: Professional rock climber
- Height: 152 cm (5 ft 0 in)
- Weight: 43 kg (95 lb)

Climbing career
- Type of climber: Competition climbing; Sport climbing; Bouldering
- Highest grade: Redpoint: 9b+ (5.15c); Onsight/Flash: 8c+ (5.14c)
- First ascents: Rèveille-toi (9a); Sitting Bull (8c+/9a); Ercole (8c/+); La Gasparata (8c+/9a); Supercrack (8b+/8c); Tomorrowland Ext (8c+/9a)
- Known for: Second youngest person (at age 14) to climb at 9a (5.14d); Third woman to climb at 9b+ (5.15c); First woman to onsight at 8c+ (5.14c)
Medal record
Women's competition climbing
Representing Italy
World Championships
Bronze medal – third place	2021 Moscow	Lead
World Cup (Overall)
Third place	2021	Lead
Third place	2025	Lead
World Cup
Gold medal – first place	Briançon 2020	Lead
Gold medal – first place	Chamonix 2021	Lead
Silver medal – second place	Villars 2021	Lead
Silver medal – second place	Chamonix 2022	Lead
Silver medal – second place	Briançon 2024	Lead
Silver medal – second place	Innsbruck 2025	Lead
Silver medal – second place	Madrid 2025	Lead
Silver medal – second place	Santiago 2026	Lead
Bronze medal – third place	Koper 2025	Lead
European Championships
Gold medal – first place	2024 Villars	Lead
Gold medal – first place	2024 Villars	Combined
Silver medal – second place	2019 Edinburgh	Lead
- Updated on 30 June 2025

Laura Rogora (born 28 April 2001) is an Italian rock climber who specializes in extreme sport climbing and in competition climbing (and in the competition lead climbing event in particular). Rogora is known for her onsights of routes, including the 2025 onsight of the 8c+ (5.14c) graded sport-climbing route, Ultimate Sacrifice, which was the first time a woman onsighted a climbing route at that grade. In 2026, she redpointed the 9b+ (5.15c) graded sport-climbing route, Bibliographie, making her only the third woman to ascend a 9b+ graded route. Rogora has won medals in competition lead climbing at both the biennial World Climbing Championship (in 2021) and for the overall annual World Climbing Series (in 2021, 2025).

== Early life and education ==
Rogora was born in Rome, Italy, and was introduced to climbing by her father. She studied mathematics at university, but paused her degree to focus on climbing.

== Climbing career ==
=== Competition climbing ===
In 2019, Rogora qualified to compete at the 2020 Summer Olympic Games, by finishing second in lead climbing at the IFSC Climbing European Championships and won 3 of 4 possible gold medals at the IFSC Climbing World Youth Championships, coming first in lead climbing, bouldering and the combined categories in the Junior age group.

She competed at the 2020 Summer Olympics, in Women's combined Olympic climbing finishing 15th, and the 2024 Olympics, finishing 18th.

=== Sport climbing ===
In 2015, aged 14, she became the second youngest climber to redpoint a 9a (5.14d)–graded sport climbing route. In 2021, she became the third female to redpoint a 9b (5.15b)-graded sport route.

In 2023, Rogora made the first female ascent/first female free ascent of Lapsus, a 9a+ (5.15a)–graded sport climbing route in Italy.

On July 28, 2025, she ticked Ultimate Sacrifice at the Gorges du Loup in France, becoming the first woman to onsight a 8c+ (5.14c).

In 2026, she climbed the sport climbing route, Bibliographie, which was her first 9b+ (5.15c) graded route. She only spent 6 days working on the route, which is the fastest anyone has completed a climb of that grade. In completing her ascent, she became only the third woman to ascend a 9b+ graded route.

== Notable ascents ==
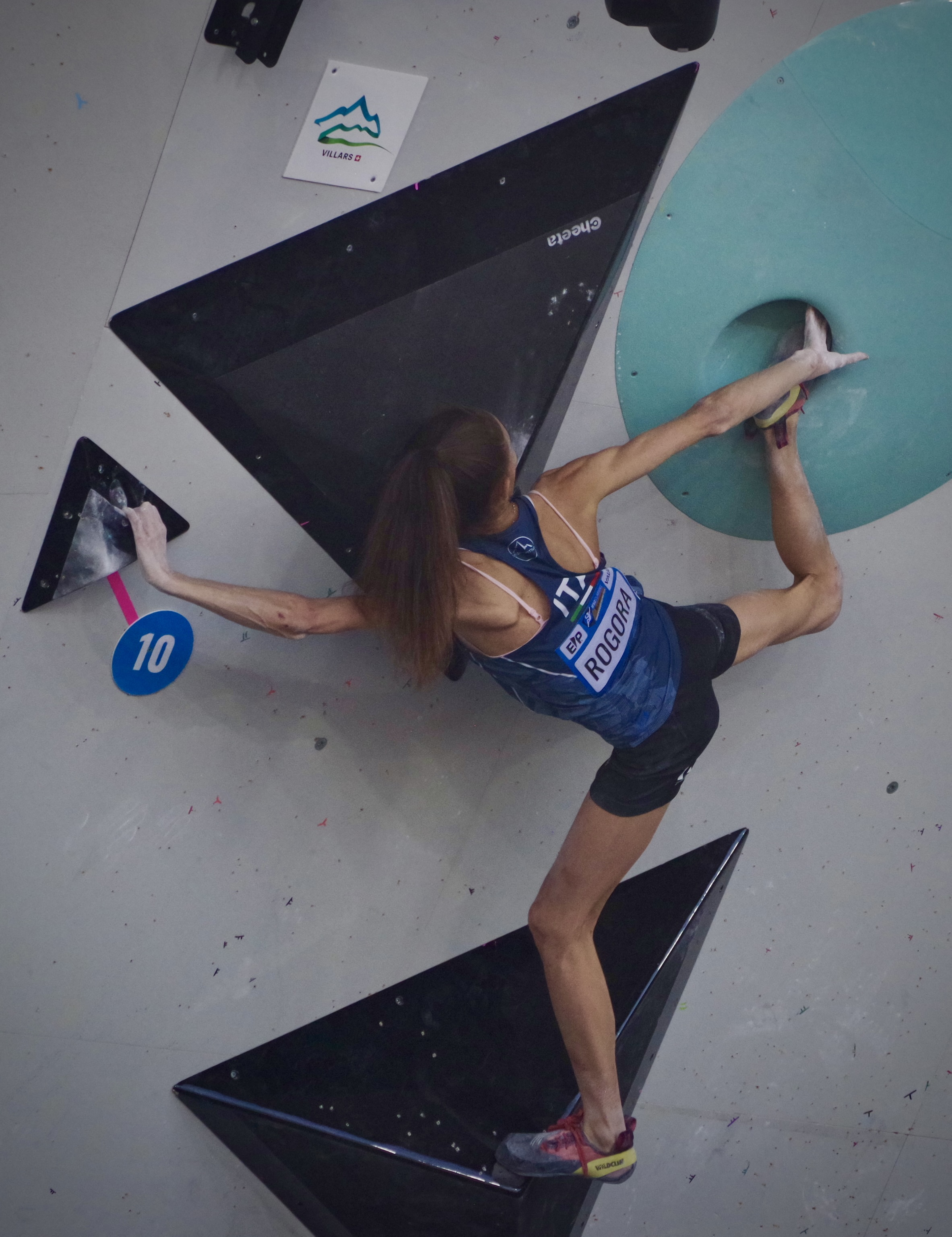
Rogora at the 2024 European Championships

=== Redpointed routes ===
- 9b+ (5.15c)
  - Bibliographie, France, August 16, 2026; third woman to climb a 9b+ route.
- 9b (5.15b)
  - Erebor, Italy, October 2021; third woman to climb a 9b route.
- 9a+ (5.15a)
  - Punt'X, France, November 2025
  - La Castagne, France, November 2025 (First female ascent. Established by Adam Ondra)
  - Super Crackinette, France, October 2025
  - Bombardino, Italy, November 2024 (First female ascent)
  - Trofeo dell’Adriatico, Italy, November 2024 (First female ascent)
  - Goldrake, Italy, September 2024 (First female ascent)
  - Lapsus, Italy, November 2023 (First female ascent of the route)
  - Ali Hulk Sit Extension Total, Rodellar, Spain, July 2020 (was once considered potential 9b)
  - Pure Dreaming Plus, Arco, Italy, 30 May 2020 (First female ascent and first repeat of the route, established by Adam Ondra)
  - The Bow, Arco, Italy, November 2020
- 9a (5.14d)
  - Le Cadafist, France, October 2025
  - Il Terzo Occhio, Italy, October 2025 (First female ascent)
  - Just Two Fix, France, July 2025
  - Trip Tik Tonik, France, July 2025
  - Tre Mou Polacche, Italy, March 2025
  - Martin Krpan, Slovenia, January 2025
  - Xaxid Hostel, Slovenia, January 2025
  - Sanjski Par (Extension), Slovenia, January 2025
  - Estado Crítico, Spain, November 2024
  - Flipping the Bird Direct, Italy, October 2024
  - Prima Classe, Italy, October 2024
  - Grandi Gesti, Sperlonga, Italy, March 2016
  - Joe-cita, Oliana, Spain, February 2017
  - Esclatamasters, Perles, Spain, January 2019
  - La Bongada, Margalef, Spain, January 2020
  - The Bomb, Rodellar, Spain, July 2020
- 8c+/9a (5.14c/5.14d)
  - Pal Norte, Margalef, Spain, December 2019
  - Underground, Massone, Italy, June 2020
- 8c+ (5.14c)
  - Joe Blau, Oliana, Spain, January 2017
  - Hulk Extension Total, Rodellar, Spain, July 2020
- 8c (5.14b)
  - Ciccio Formaggio, Grotta dell’Aerenauta, Sperlonga, Italy, December 2014 (her first 8c at age 13).
  - Il Corvo, Ferentillo, Italy, April 2015
  - Wallstreet, Frankenjura, Germany, August 2016

=== First ascents ===
- Tomorrowland extension, 8c+/9a (5.14c/5.14d), Cueva di Collepardo, November 2016
- Supercrack, 8c+/9a (5.14c/5.14d), Cueva di Collepardo, December 2016
- La Gasparata, 8c+/9a (5.14c/5.14d), Cueva di Collepardo, January 2017
- Ercole, 8c+ (5.14c), Cueva di Collepardo, March 2017
- It segid narg, 8c+ (5.14c), Grotta dell'Arenauta Sperlonga, December 2017
- Sitting Bull, 8c+/9a (5.14c/5.14d), Cueva di Collepardo, April 2018
- Rèveille-toi, 9a (5.14d), Cueva di Collepardo, June 2019
- Iron Man, 9a (5.14d), Trentino, September 2021
- L’Ultimo Ruggito, 9a (5.14d), Gole del Melfa, October 2025

=== Onsighted routes ===
- 8c+ (5.14c)
  - Ultimate Sacrifice, the Gorges du Loup, France, July 2025
- 8b+ (5.14a)
  - Ixeia, Rodellar, Spain, July 2020
  - L-mens, Montsant, Spain, January 2020

== Competition climbing highlights ==
=== IFSC Olympic qualifying ===
- IFSC Combined Qualifier Toulouse 2019
  - Women combined: 8th (qualified)

=== IFSC Climbing European Championships ===
Discipline	Edinburgh 2019	Munich 2022	Villars 2024
Lead	2	26	1
Boulder & Lead	-	-	1

=== IFSC Climbing World Championships ===
Discipline	Innsbruck 2018	Hachioji 2019	Moscow 2021	Bern 2023	Seoul 2025
Lead	10	20	3	7	9

=== IFSC Climbing World Youth Championships ===
Discipline	2017 Youth A	2018 Youth A	2019 Juniors
Lead	4	6	1
Boulder	4	1	1
Combined	6	-	1

=== European Youth Championships ===
- 2017 European Youth Championships (Lead & Speed) (Perm)
  - Female Youth A lead: 4th

== See also ==
- List of grade milestones in rock climbing
- History of rock climbing
- Rankings of most career IFSC gold medals
