= Alberto Ginés =

Spanish climber (born 2002)

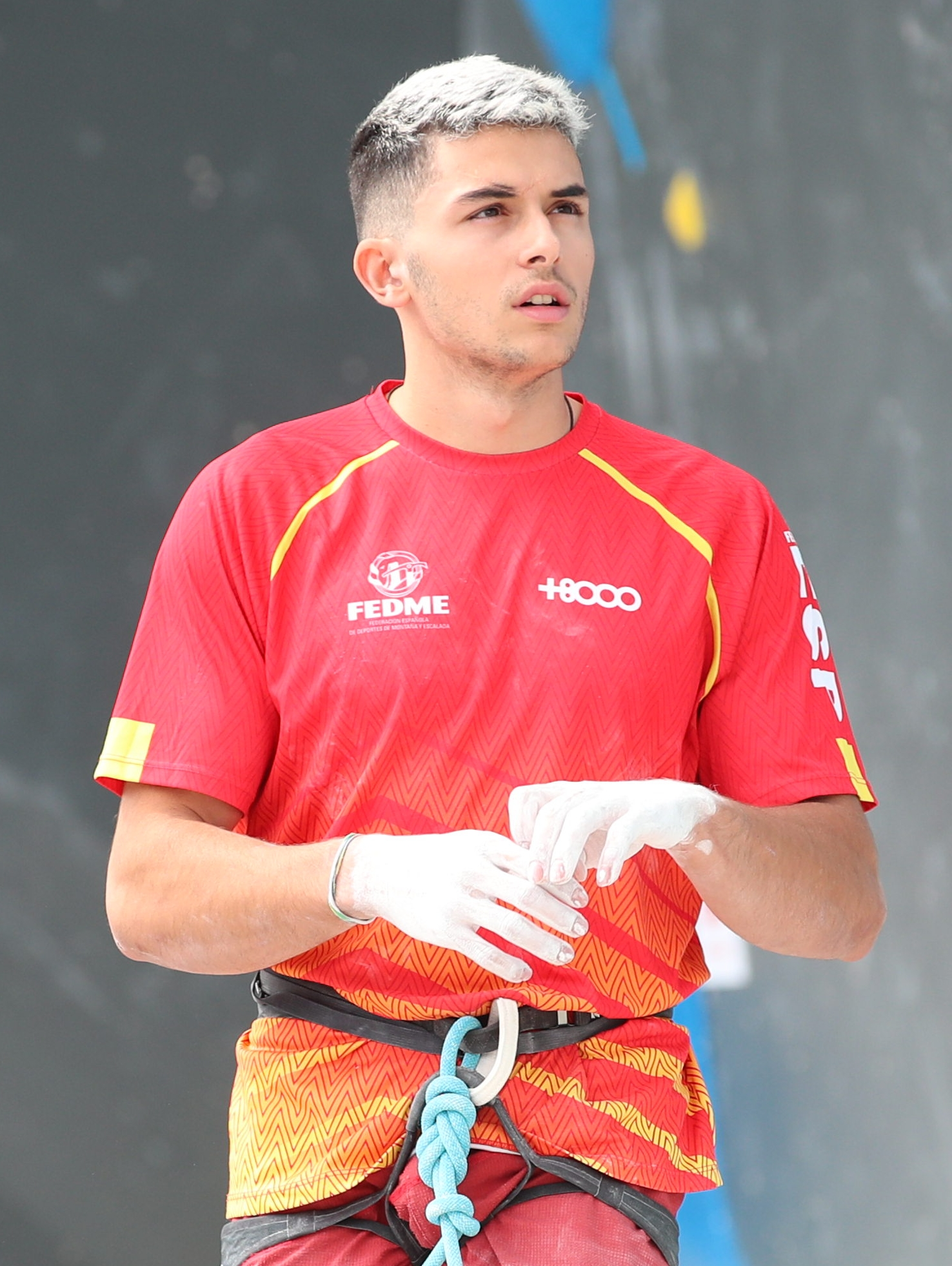
- Ginés at the European Championships 2022

Personal information
- Full name: Alberto Ginés López
- Born: 23 October 2002 (age 24) Cáceres, Cáceres, Spain
- Occupation: Professional rock climber
- Height: 169 cm (5 ft 7 in)
- Weight: 58 kg (128 lb)

Climbing career
- Type of climber: Competition climbing
- Known for: Winning the first Olympic gold in Sport climbing Combined, Men's Division, in Tokyo, 2021
Medal record
Men's competition climbing
Representing Spain
Olympic Games
Gold medal – first place	2020 Tokyo	Combined
World Cup
Winner	2025	Lead
Second place	2019	Lead
Third place	2026	Lead
European Championships
Gold medal – first place	2026 Laval	Lead
Silver medal – second place	2019 Edinburgh	Lead
Bronze medal – third place	2022 Munich	Lead
Bronze medal – third place	2022 Munich	Combined
- Updated on 5 August 2021

Alberto Ginés López (Note: In this Spanish name, the first or paternal surname is Ginés and the second or maternal family name is López.) (born 23 October 2002) is a Spanish professional rock climber, specializing in competition lead climbing and competition bouldering. He won gold at the first Olympic sport climbing event at the 2020 Summer Olympics in Tokyo in August 2021. He placed second in the 2019 Lead Climbing World Cup and won a silver medal at the 2019 Lead Climbing European Championship.

== Biography ==
Ginés started climbing with his parents when he was very young. In 2013, Ginés, who was 10 years old at the time, met professional climbing coach David Macià in Rodellar, after his father introduced the child to him. Macià was surprised by the attitude with which Ginés climbed the sport climbing route, El Delfín 7c+ (5.13a), and became his coach.

In 2016, after the announcement that competition climbing would become an Olympic sport at 2020 Summer Olympics in Tokyo, he moved from Cáceres to Barcelona to train, with the goal of qualifying for the international event.

In August 2017, Ginés took a silver medal at the Lead Climbing Youth World Championships, in the category Youth B. A month later, he won the Lead Climbing European Youth Championship in the same category. In May 2018, Ginés won the Lead Climbing European Youth Championship, in the category Youth A. In August 2019, he took bronze medals at the Lead Climbing and Combined Climbing Youth World Championships, in the category Youth A. A month later, Ginés also won a bronze at the Lead Climbing European Youth Championships, in the same category.

On 6 October 2019, Ginés won a silver medal at the Lead Climbing European Championships. Later that month, he finished second in the Lead Climbing World Cup, winning medals in two of its six events: a bronze in Kranj and a silver in the last event, held in Inzai. In November, Ginés qualified to compete at the 2020 Summer Olympics in Tokyo. He won gold in the men's combined event at the 2020 Summer Olympics.

== Rankings ==
=== Climbing World Cup ===
Discipline	2019	2025	2026
Lead	2	1	3

=== World Championships ===
Discipline	Hachioji 2019	Bern 2023	Seoul 2025
Lead	31	24	4
Boulder	31	30	-
Combined	36	29	-

=== Climbing European Championships ===
Discipline	2019	2022	2026
Lead	2	3	1

== Number of medals in the Climbing European Youth Cup ==
=== Lead ===
Season	Category	Gold	Silver	Bronze	Total
2017	Youth B	2	1	1	4
2018	Youth A	1		1	2
2019	Youth A	2		1	3
Total		5	1	3	9

=== Bouldering ===
Season	Category	Gold	Silver	Bronze	Total
2017	Youth B	2			2
2018	Youth A	1	1		2
2019	Youth A	1	1		2
Total		4	2	0	6

== Number of medals in the Climbing World Cup ==
=== Lead ===
Season	Gold	Silver	Bronze	Total
2019		1	1	2
2023			1	1
2025		3	3	6
2026	1	2		3
Total	1	6	5	12

== Notable ascents ==
=== Redpointed routes ===
9b (5.15b):

- El Bon Combat – Cova de L'Ocell (ESP) – February 2026 – First ascent by Chris Sharma. Graded 9a+ by Ginés.

9a (5.14d):

- Open your Mind Direct – Santa Linya (ESP) – October 2024.
- JoeDan – Santa Linya (ESP) – December 2023.
- Jungle Speed – Siurana (ESP) – December 2023.
- Victimes del Futur – Margalef (ESP) – April 2018. Second ascent after Ramón Julián.

=== Boulder problems ===
8C (V15):

- Dreamtime – Cresciano (SUI) – November 2025.

8B+ (V14):

- Off the Wagon – Val Bavona (SUI) – January 2023.

== See also ==
- History of rock climbing
