= Oriane Bertone =

French rock climber (born 2005)

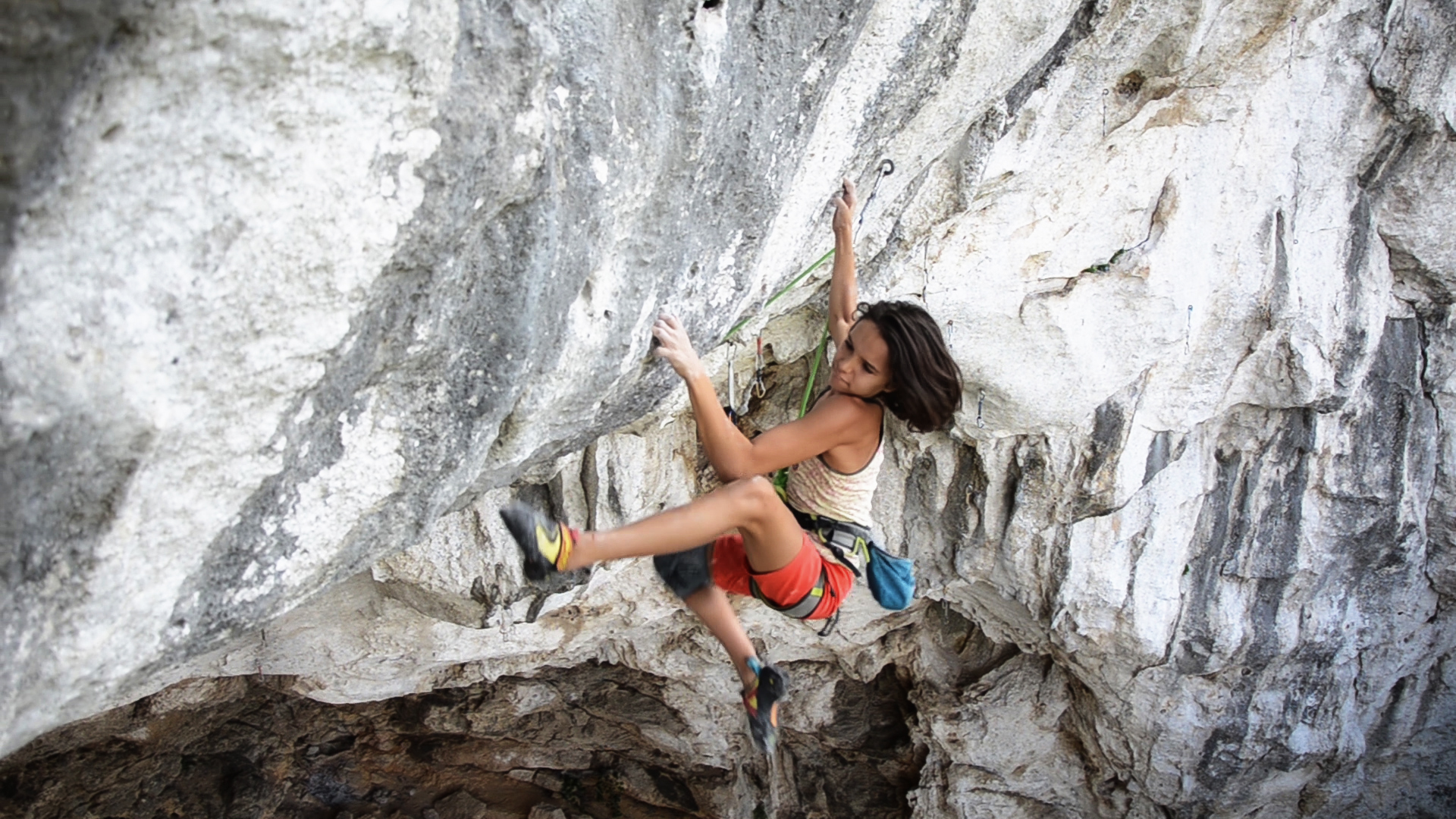
- Oriane Bertone, Giravuelta

Personal information
- Nationality: French
- Born: 10 March 2005 (age 21) Nice, France
- Height: 167 cm (5 ft 6 in)

Climbing career
- Type of climber: Competition climbing; Sport climbing; Bouldering
- Ape index: +16cm (6 in)
- Highest grade: Redpoint: 5.14c (8c+); Bouldering: V15 (8C)
- Known for: Youngest person to solve a V14 (8B+) boulder problem
Medal record
Women's competition climbing
Representing France
World Championships
Silver medal – second place	2023 Bern	Bouldering
Silver medal – second place	2025 Seoul	Bouldering
World Cup (Season)
Gold medal – first place	2025	Bouldering
World Cup
Gold medal – first place	Prague 2023	Bouldering
Gold medal – first place	Prague 2025	Bouldering
Gold medal – first place	Salt Lake City 2026	Bouldering
Silver medal – second place	Meiringen 2021	Bouldering
Silver medal – second place	Salt Lake City 2021	Bouldering
Silver medal – second place	Seoul 2022	Bouldering
Silver medal – second place	Seoul 2023	Bouldering
Silver medal – second place	Salt Lake City 2023	Bouldering
Silver medal – second place	Salt Lake City 2024	Bouldering
Silver medal – second place	Keqiao 2025	Bouldering
Silver medal – second place	Curitiba 2025	Bouldering
Silver medal – second place	Innsbruck 2025	Bouldering
Bronze medal – third place	Madrid 2026	Bouldering
European Championships
Gold medal – first place	2026 Barcelona	Bouldering
Bronze medal – third place	2022 Munich	Bouldering
- Updated on 20 August 2026

Oriane Bertone (born 10 March 2005) is a French rock climber, who specializes in competition climbing, but is also noted for her sport climbing and her bouldering.

== Climbing career ==
=== Rock climbing ===
In 2018, when she was 12 years old, Bertone became the youngest climber to send a V14 (8B+) graded boulder problem when she solved Golden Shadow in Rocklands (South Africa). In 2020, aged 14, she redpointed the sport climbing route, Panonoramix et les cyclopes, in Saint Léger at grade 8c+ (5.14c).

=== Competition climbing ===
In 2019, she started competing in international youth competition climbing events, where she won multiple gold medals in both competition lead climbing and competition bouldering.

In 2021, Bertone made her IFSC Climbing World Cup debut at age 16 at the Boulder World Cup in Meiringen, where she advanced to the final and won a silver medal.

In 2023, Bertone won her first IFSC Climbing World Cup gold medal at the Boulder World Cup in Prague, beating Janja Garnbret in doing so. She went on to win a silver medal in bouldering at the 2023 IFSC Climbing World Championships and secure a spot for the 2024 Summer Olympics in Paris by placing first in the European Boulder and Lead Climbing Olympic Qualifier.

In 2024, Bertone finished in eighth place in the combined bouldering and lead climbing event at the 2024 Summer Olympics.

In 2026, she won the inaugural Pro Climbing League in London, beating Janja Garnbret in the final.

Also in 2026, she made the first female ascent of The Big Island V15, which is in Fontainebleau, France.

== Personal life ==
Bertone was born in Nice in 2005, and grew up on the island of Réunion, a territory of France, to an Italian father and French mother.

Her younger brother Max Bertone is also a climber who has competed at World Cup level since 2024.

== Rankings ==
=== European Youth Championships ===
Discipline	2019 Youth B
Boulder	1
Lead	1

=== Youth World Championships ===
Discipline	2019 Youth B
Boulder	1
Lead	1

=== European Championships ===
Discipline	2022
Boulder	3

=== IFSC Climbing World Cup Overall Ranking ===
Discipline	2021	2022	2023	2024	2025	2026
Boulder	3	6	4	10	1	4

=== IFSC World Cup ===
==== Podiums ====
Season	First	Second	Third	Total
2021		2		2
2022		1		1
2023	1	2		3
2024		1		1
2025	1	3		4
2026	1		1	2
Total	3	9	1	13

== Notable ascents ==
=== Boulder problems ===
8C (V15):

- Satan I Helvete - Bas, Fontainebleau (France) - 2020
- The Big Island - Fontainebleau (France) - 2026

8B+ (V14):

- Golden Shadow - Rocklands (South Africa) - 2018
- Super Tanker - Fontainebleau (France) - 2021

8B (V13):

- Psychopad - Réunion - 2017
- Le Spartiate direct assis - Réunion - 2018
- Fragile Steps - RockLands (South Africa) - 2017
- Trafic - Fontainebleau - 2018
- The master Key - Rocklands (South Africa) - 2019
- Bio Affinity - Rocklands (South Africa) - 2019
- Ray of light - Rocklands (South Africa) - 2020
- Leopard cave extended - Rocklands (South Africa) - 2020
- Agamemnon - Rocklands (South Africa) - 2020
- Fata I Helvete - Fontainebleau - 2020

=== Redpointed routes ===
8c+ (5.14c):

- Panonoramix et les cyclopes - Saint Léger - 2020

8c (5.14b):

- Chykungunya - Réunion - 2018
- Stay Kratom, stay home - Saint Léger - 2020
- Panonoramix - Saint Léger - 2020
