= Leander Carmanns =

German speed climber (born 2004)

Personal information
- Born: 30 September 2004 (age 21)
- Home town: Düsseldorf, Germany
- Years active: 2019–present

Climbing career
- Type of climber: Competition speed climbing

Sport
- Country: Germany
Medal record
Men's competition climbing
Representing Germany
World Championships
| Silver medal – second place | 2025 Seoul | Speed |

Leander Carmanns (born 30 September 2004) is a German competition speed climber.

== Career ==
Carmanns represented Germany at the 2025 IFSC Climbing World Championships and won a silver medal in the men's speed event. This was Germany's first ever sport climbing medal at the World Championships.
