= Zach Hammer =

American speed climber (born 2006)

Personal information
- Full name: Zachary Hammer
- Born: May 29, 2006 (age 20)
- Home town: Ann Arbor, Michigan, U.S.
- Years active: 2022–present

Climbing career
- Type of climber: Competition speed climbing
Medal record
Men's competition climbing
Representing the United States
World Championships
Bronze medal – third place	2025 Seoul	Speed
World Games
Bronze medal – third place	2025 Chengdu	Speed relay

Zachary Hammer (born May 29, 2006) is an American competition speed climber. He represented the United States at the 2024 Summer Olympics.

== Career ==
Hammer represented the United States at the 2024 Summer Olympics in the men's speed event. In August 2025, he competed at the 2025 World Games and won a bronze medal in the speed relay along with Sam Watson. The next month he competed at the 2025 IFSC Climbing World Championships and won a bronze medal in the men's speed event.
