= Manon Hily =

French rock climber

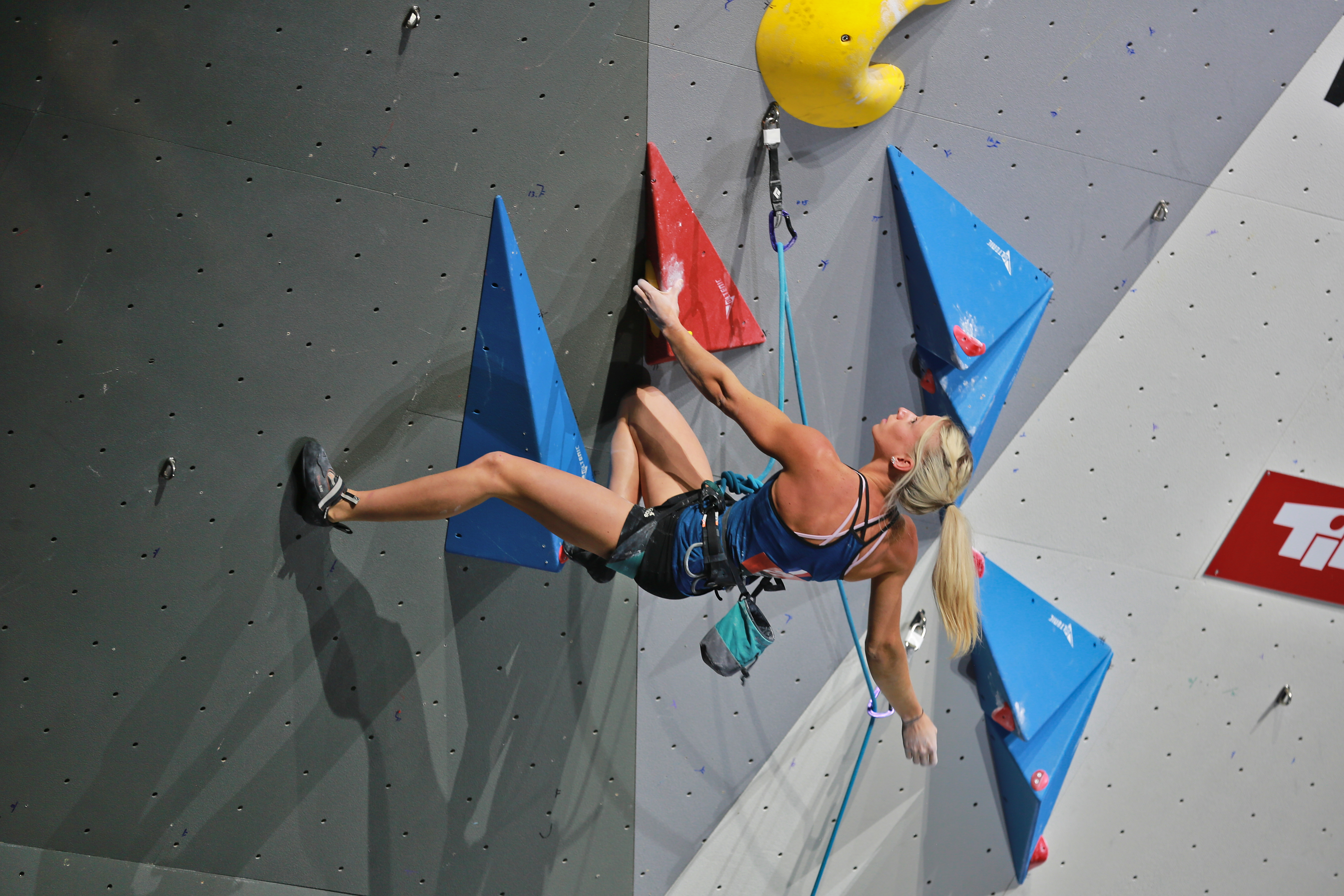
- Manon Hily, World Championships 2018

Personal information
- Nationality: French
- Born: 24 January 1994 (age 32) Aix-en-Provence
- Occupations: Nurse; Rock climber

Climbing career
- Type of climber: Sport climbing; Competition lead climbing
- Highest grade: 8c+/9a
Medal record
Women's competition climbing
Representing France
European Championships
Bronze medal – third place	2022 Munich	Lead

Manon Hily (born 24 January 1994) is a French rock climber, specialising in competition lead climbing and sport climbing. She is also a qualified nurse.

In August 2022, she took part in the European Championships in Munich and got a bronze medal in lead climbing behind Janja Garnbret and Jessica Pilz.

Outside of competition climbing, she has redpointed 8c (5.14b) graded sport climbing routes in places such as Buoux or Céüse in France, or Margalef in Spain.

Besides climbing, she works as a nurse in the South of France.

== Rankings ==
=== European championships ===
Discipline	2022
Lead	3
