= Natalia Kałucka =

Polish speed climber

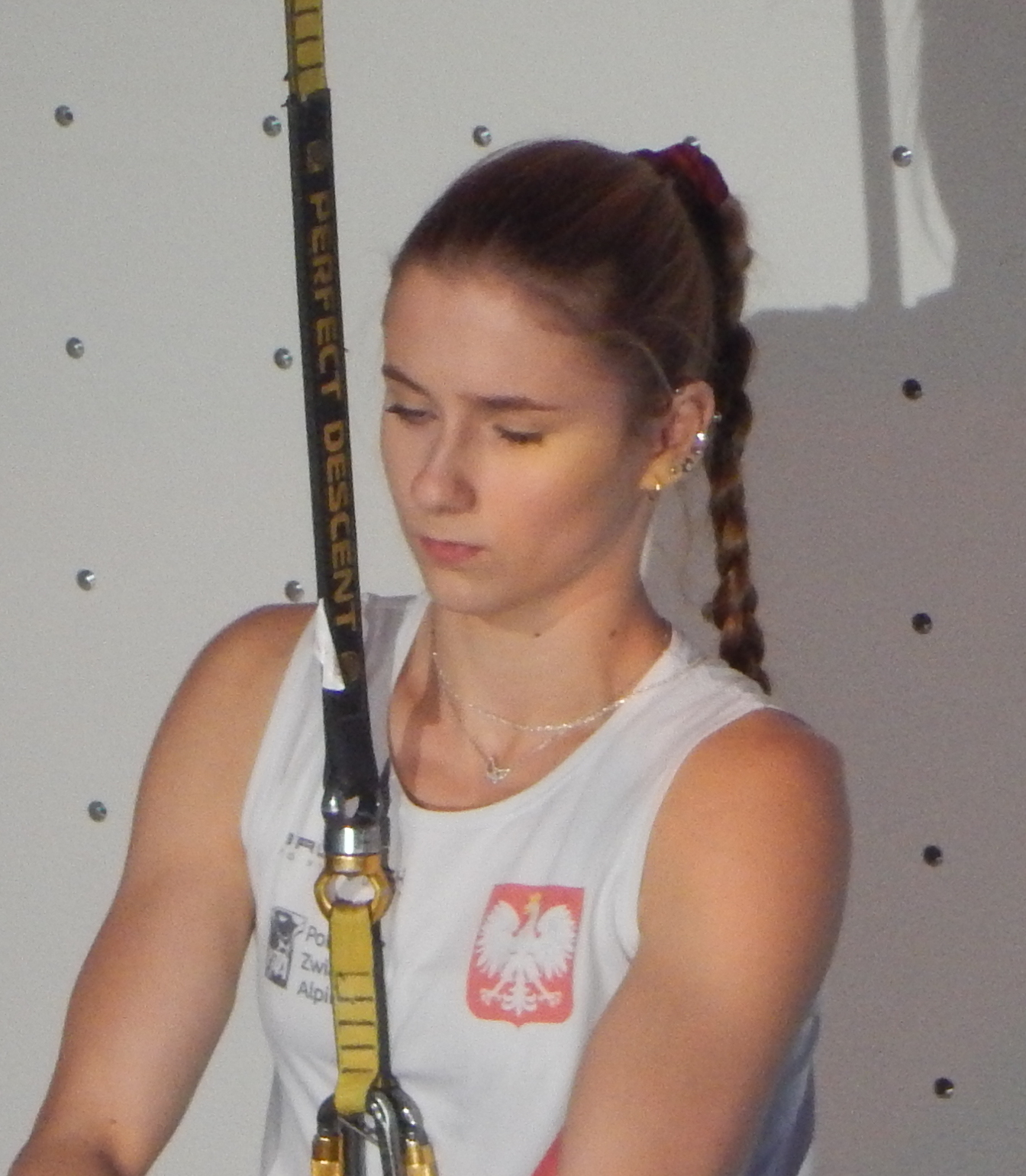
- Kałucka in 2020

Personal information
- Born: December 25, 2001 (age 24) Tarnów, Poland
- Height: 165 cm (5 ft 5 in)

Sport
- Country: Poland
- Sport: Competition speed climbing
Medal record
Women's competition climbing
Representing Poland
World Games
Silver medal – second place	2022 Birmingham	Speed
World Championships
Gold medal – first place	2021 Moscow	Speed
European Championships
Gold medal – first place	2024 Villars	Speed
Bronze medal – third place	2022 Munich	Speed
European Games
Gold medal – first place	2023 Kraków–Małopolska	Speed

Natalia Kałucka (born 25 December 2001) is a Polish competition climber who specialises in competition speed climbing. She is a World Championships, European Championships and European Games gold medallist, and a World Games silver medallist. Kałucka won the gold medal in the women's speed event at the 2021 World Championships, 2024 European Championships and 2023 European Games. She is the twin sister of fellow speed climber Aleksandra Kałucka.

== Achievements ==
=== World Championships ===
Discipline	2018	2019	2021	2023
Speed	10	10	1	9
Boulder	92			
Lead	75			
Combined	36			

=== European Championships ===
Discipline	2019	2022	2024
Speed	13	3	1
Lead	30		
Boulder	32		
