= Sam Avezou =

French rock climber (born 2001)

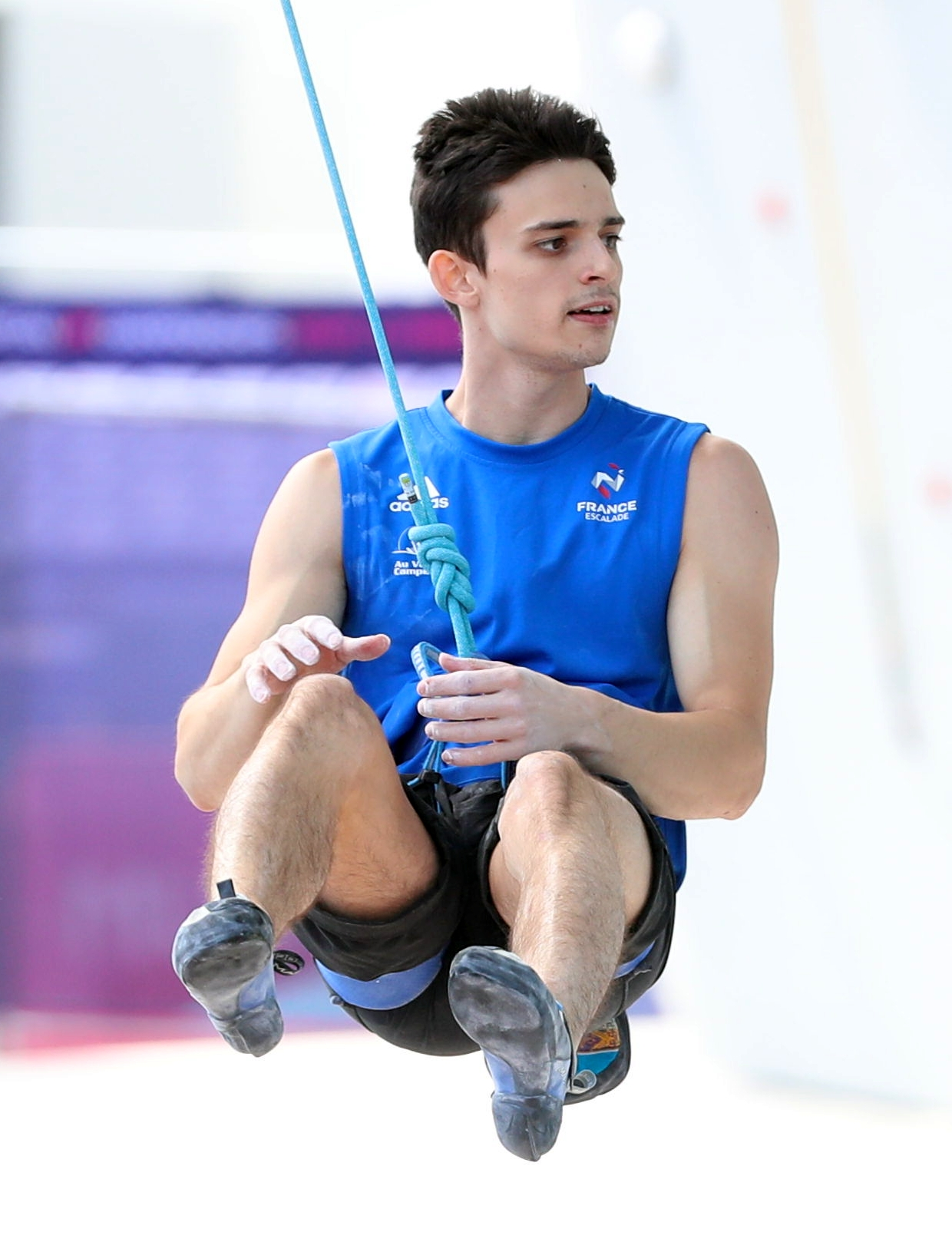
- Avezou in 2022

Personal information
- Nationality: France
- Born: 22 March 2001 (age 25)
- Relative: Zélia Avezou (sister)

Climbing career
- Type of climber: Competition climbing
Medal record
Men's competition climbing
Representing France
World Cup
Silver medal – second place	Chamonix 2024	Lead
Silver medal – second place	Chamonix 2023	Lead
Bronze medal – third place	Koper 2024	Lead
Bronze medal – third place	Innsbruck 2023	Bouldering
European Championships
Gold medal – first place	Villars 2024	Boulder
Gold medal – first place	Villars 2024	Combined
Silver medal – second place	Munich 2022	Boulder
Silver medal – second place	Villars 2024	Lead
Bronze medal – third place	Laval 2026	Lead

Sam Avezou (born 22 March 2001) is a French rock climber who specializes in competition climbing. He won the silver medal in the bouldering event at the 2022 IFSC Climbing European Championships. He qualified for the boulder and lead combined event at the 2024 Summer Olympics, placing 11th overall.
