= Erin McNeice =

British rock climber (born 2004)

Erin McNeice OLY
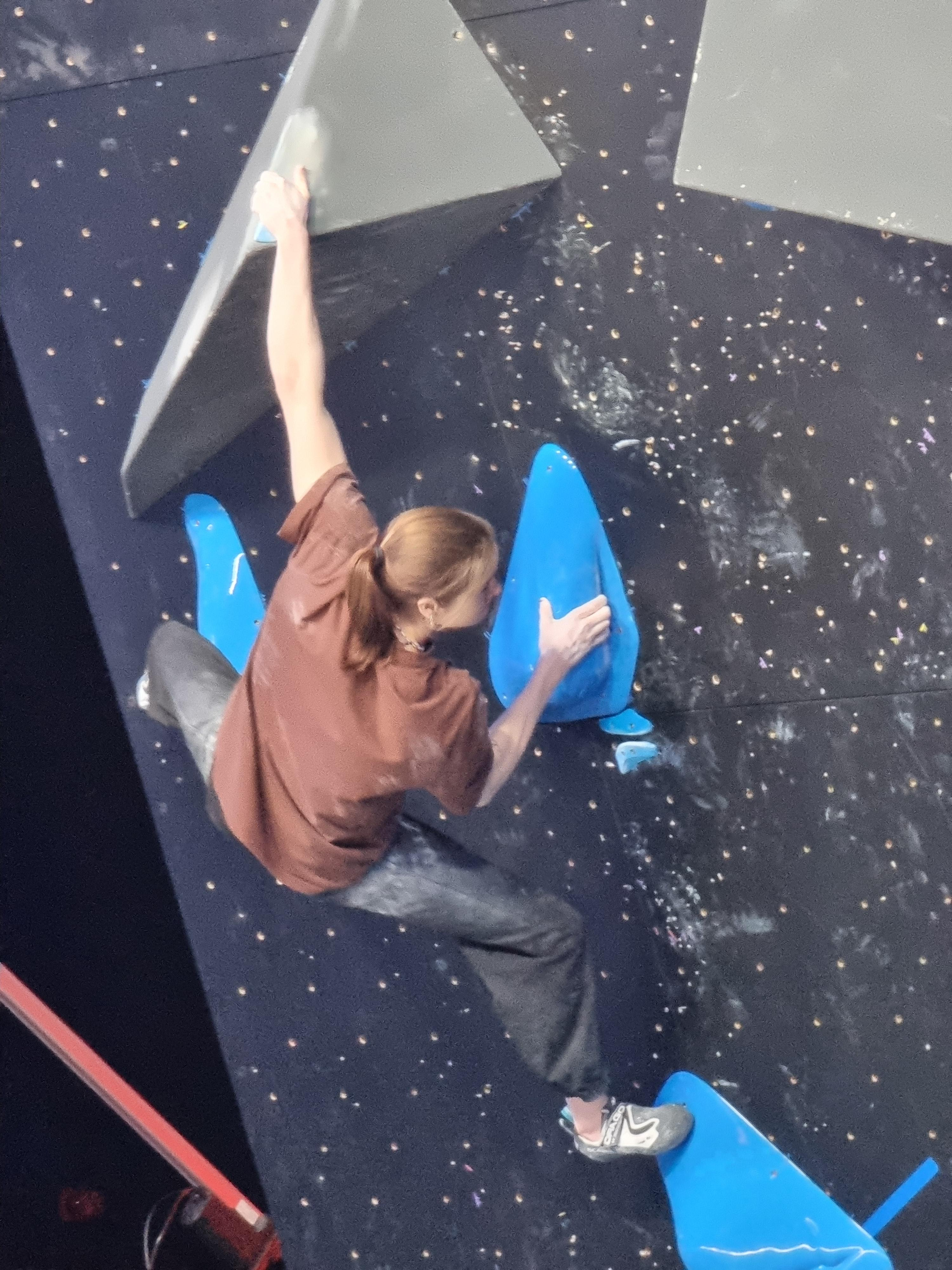
- Erin McNeice, London 2026

Personal information
- Nickname: Erin McBeast
- Nationality: British
- Born: 6 April 2004 (age 22) Rodmersham, Kent, England
- Occupation: Professional rock climber
- Height: 165 cm (5 ft 5 in)

Climbing career
- Type of climber: Competition climbing; Bouldering; Lead; Sport climbing
Medal record
Women's competition climbing
Representing Great Britain
World Cup (Overall)
Winner	2025	Lead
Winner	2026	Bouldering
World Cup
Gold medal – first place	2025 Bali	Lead
Gold medal – first place	2025 Bern	Bouldering
Gold medal – first place	2025 Wujiang	Lead
Gold medal – first place	2026 Madrid	Bouldering
Silver medal – second place	2026 Innsbruck	Bouldering
Silver medal – second place	2026 Prague	Bouldering
Silver medal – second place	2026 Bern	Bouldering
Silver medal – second place	2026 Salt Lake City	Bouldering
Bronze medal – third place	2024 Seoul	Bouldering
Bronze medal – third place	2025 Chamonix	Lead
Bronze medal – third place	2025 Innsbruck	Lead
Bronze medal – third place	2025 Keqiao	Bouldering
European Championships
Gold medal – first place	2026 Laval	Lead

Erin McNeice OLY (born 6 April 2004) is an English rock climber who specialises in competition climbing. She represented Great Britain at the 2024 Summer Olympics, finishing fifth in the combined Boulder and Lead competition. McNeice won the 2025 IFSC Climbing World Cup Lead title and the 2026 IFSC Climbing World Cup Bouldering title.

== Biography ==
=== Early life and career ===
McNeice started climbing at the age of five when her father took her and her older brother to a climbing gym.

Aged 12, after four years living in Malaysia where she trained on larger climbing walls, McNeice entered her first national competition before eventually making it onto the Great Britain Climbing junior squad and going on to represent her country at the 2021 IFSC Climbing World Youth Championships, where she placed 5th in Bouldering and 10th in Lead.

=== 2022–2023: First national senior titles ===
In 2022, and still only 17-years-old, she became the youngest member of the Great Britain Climbing senior team.

McNeice won the British Lead senior title in 2022 and 2023.

=== 2024: Fifth at Paris Olympics ===
She took a bronze medal at the first Olympic Qualifier Series event in Shanghai, China, in May.

The following month, McNeice matched that performance at the second event of the series in Budapest, Hungary, to book her spot at the 2024 Summer Olympics.

Her Olympic place was officially confirmed when Team GB named their climbing squad on 3 July. At the Games in Paris, McNeice was 10th after the bouldering section of the semi-finals and then came seventh in the Lead round to qualify for the final in a combined seventh position. She finished fifth in the final.

On 3 October, McNeice won her first IFSC Climbing World Cup medal, claiming bronze in the bouldering competition at the final event of the 2024 season in Seoul, South Korea. In doing so she became only the third British woman to win a medal at a Bouldering World Cup competition after Shauna Coxsey and Claire Bell. The result also meant McNeice finished ninth in the overall 2024 Bouldering World Cup standings.

=== 2025: World Cup Lead champion ===
On 26 January, she won the British Bouldering Championships. On 9 February, she also won the British Lead Climbing Championships and became double champion.

In April, McNeice claimed her second world cup medal, taking bronze in the opening bouldering event of the season in Keqiao, Shaoxing, China. Later that month she won her first IFSC gold medal at the Lead World Cup in Wujiang, China, tied with South Korean climber Seo Chae-hyun.

In May, McNeice won her second lead gold medal at the World Cup event in Bali. The following month, she won her first boulder World Cup gold at the World Cup round in Bern, Switzerland, making her the first British woman to win a World Cup in two sport climbing disciplines.

In September, a fourth place finish in Koper, Slovenia, was enough to see McNeice win the overall World Cup Lead title, becoming the first British female climber to do so.

=== 2026: European Lead champion ===
On 29 May, McNeice won the Bouldering gold medal at the fourth event of the newly named World Climbing Series in Madrid, Spain, taking first place as the only woman to top all four problems in the final.

McNeice won gold in the Lead competition at the European Championships in Laval, France, on 30 August 2026, being the only competitor to finish the course in the final and doing so with less than three seconds left on her allotted time.

== See also ==
- Shauna Coxsey
