= Sport climbing at the 2024 Summer Olympics – Qualification =

In qualifying for the 2024 Summer Olympics, a total of 68 climbers, with an equal distribution between men and women, were to compete across two separate competition climbing disciplines at these Games for the first time, namely: a unique competition bouldering-and-competition lead climbing combined event, and a separate competition speed climbing event.

== Qualification summary ==
Nation	Boulder and Lead		Speed		Total
Nation	Men	Women	Men	Women	Total
Australia	1	1			2
Austria	1	1			2
Belgium	1				1
China	1	2	2	2	7
Czech Republic	1				1
France	2	2	1	2	7
Germany	2	1			3
Great Britain	2	2			4
Indonesia			2	2	4
Iran			1		1
Italy		2	1	1	4
Japan	2	2			4
Kazakhstan			1		1
New Zealand			1	1	2
Poland				2	2
Slovenia	1	2			3
South Africa	1	1	1	1	4
South Korea	1	1	1		3
Spain	1			1	2
Switzerland	1				1
Ukraine		1	1		2
United States	2	2	2	2	8
Total: 22 NOCs	20	20	14	14	68

== Boulder and lead combined ==
A total of 40 climbers (twenty per gender) will compete in the men's and women's competition bouldering-and-competition lead climbing combined event for Paris 2024. Each National Olympic Committees (NOC) could only send a maximum of four climbers with an equal split between men and women. Quota places are allocated to the athletes by name. These qualification spots will be awarded as follows:

- World Championships – The three highest-ranked climbers in each of the two events will obtain a quota place, respecting a two-member limit for their NOC.
- Continental Qualification Events – The highest-ranked eligible male and female climber at each of the five continental qualifying tournaments (Africa, Asia, Europe, the Americas, and Oceania) will obtain a quota place, respecting a two-member limit for his or her NOC.
- Olympic Qualifier Series – The top ten male and female climbers after a series of two events in 2024 will obtain a quota place, respecting a two-member limit for their NOC. The list of athletes who will compete for these places has been published by the IFSC.
- Host country – As the host country, France reserves one quota place each for the men's and women's boulder-and-lead combined events. If one or more French sport climbers qualify regularly and directly through the world championships or their respective continental meet, the host country slots will be reallocated.
- Universality places – Two invitational places will be entitled to eligible NOCs interested to have their sport climbers compete in Paris 2024 as granted by the Universality principle.
- Reallocation – Unused quota spots for host country and universality will be reallocated to the next eligible climbers from the Olympic Qualifier series.

=== Timeline ===
Event	Date	Venue
2023 IFSC Climbing World Championships	August 1–12, 2023	(Switzerland) Bern
2023 Pan American Games	October 21–24, 2023	(Chile) Santiago
2023 European Boulder & Lead Climbing Olympic Qualifier	October 26–29, 2023	(France) Laval
2023 Asian Sport Climbing Olympic Qualifier	November 9–12, 2023	(Indonesia) Jakarta
2023 Oceania Sport Climbing Olympic Qualifier	November 24–26, 2023	(Australia) Melbourne
2023 African Sport Climbing Olympic Qualifier	December 7–9, 2023	(South Africa) Pretoria
2024 Olympic Qualifier Series	May 16–19, 2024; June 20–23, 2024	(China) Shanghai (Hungary) Budapest

=== Qualification table ===
Event	Male		Female	
Event	Places	Qualified sport climber	Places	Qualified sport climber
Host nation	0 (Note: France filled the men's Boulder and Lead slot when two French athletes qualified in the Olympic Qualifier Series.)	—N/a	0 (Note: France filled the women's Boulder and Lead slot when Oriane Bertone qualified in the European Qualifier.)	—N/a
2023 World Championships	3	Jakob Schubert (AUT); Colin Duffy (USA); Tomoa Narasaki (JPN)	3	Janja Garnbret (SLO); Jessica Pilz (AUT); Ai Mori (JPN)
2023 Pan American Games	1	Jesse Grupper (USA)	1	Natalia Grossman (USA)
2023 European Qualifier	1	Toby Roberts (GBR)	1	Oriane Bertone (FRA)
2023 Asian Qualifier	1	Sorato Anraku (JPN)	1	Zhang Yuetong (CHN)
2023 Oceania Qualifier	1	Campbell Harrison (AUS)	1	Oceana Mackenzie (AUS)
2023 African Qualifier	1	Mel Janse van Rensburg (RSA)	1	Lauren Mukheibir (RSA)
Olympic Qualifying Series	10	Lee Do-hyun (KOR); Sam Avezou (FRA); Adam Ondra (CZE); Alberto Ginés López (ESP); Hannes Van Duysen (BEL); Paul Jenft (FRA); Yannick Flohé (GER); Hamish McArthur (GBR); Sascha Lehmann (SUI); Alexander Megos (GER)	10	Brooke Raboutou (USA); Miho Nonaka (JPN); Erin McNeice (GBR); Seo Chae-hyun (KOR); Luo Zhilu (CHN); Jenya Kazbekova (UKR); Mia Krampl (SLO); Lucia Dörffel (GER); Zélia Avezou (FRA); Camilla Moroni (ITA)
Universality places	0	—N/a	0	—N/a
Reallocation	2	Luka Potočar (SLO); Pan Yufei (CHN)	2	Laura Rogora (ITA); Molly Thompson-Smith (GBR)
Total	20		20	

== Speed ==
A total of 28 climbers (fourteen per gender) will compete in the inaugural men's and women's competition speed climbing events, respectively, for Paris 2024. Each NOC could only send a maximum of four climbers with an equal split between men and women. Quota places are allocated to the athletes by name. These qualification spots will be awarded as follows:

- World Championships – The two highest-ranked climbers (a champion and a runner-up) in each event will obtain a quota place, respecting a two-member limit for their NOC.
- Continental Qualification Events – The highest-ranked eligible male and female climber at each of the five continental qualifying tournaments (Africa, Asia, Europe, the Americas, and Oceania) will obtain a quota place, respecting a two-member limit for his or her NOC.
- Olympic Qualifier Series – The top five male and female climbers after a four-month-long invitational series of events will obtain a quota place, respecting a two-member limit for their NOC.
- Host country – As the host country, France reserves one quota place each for the men's and women's boulder-and-lead combined events. If one or more French sport climbers qualify regularly and directly through the world championships or their respective continental meet, their slots will be reallocated to the next highest-ranked eligible sport climbers from the Olympic Qualifier Series.
- Universality places – Two invitational places will be entitled to eligible NOCs interested to have their sport climbers compete in Paris 2024 as granted by the Universality principle.
- Reallocation – Unused quota spots will be reallocated.

=== Timeline ===
Event	Date	Venue
2023 IFSC Climbing World Championships	August 1–12, 2023	(Switzerland) Bern
2023 European Speed Climbing Olympic Qualifier	September 15, 2023	(Italy) Rome
2023 Pan American Games	October 21–24, 2023	(Chile) Cerrillos
2023 Asian Sport Climbing Olympic Qualifier	November 9-12, 2023	(Indonesia) Jakarta
2023 Oceania Sport Climbing Olympic Qualifier	November 24–26, 2023	(Australia) Melbourne
2023 African Sport Climbing Olympic Qualifier	December 7–9, 2023	(South Africa) Pretoria
Olympic Qualifier Series	May 16–19, 2024; June 20–23, 2024	(China) Shanghai (Hungary) Budapest

=== Qualification table ===
Event	Male		Female	
Event	Places	Qualified speed climber	Places	Qualified speed climber
Host nation	0 (Note: France filled the men's speed slot when Bassa Mawem qualified in the European Qualifier.)	—N/a	0 (Note: France filled the women's speed slot when Capucine Viglione and Manon Lebon qualified in the Olympic Qualifying Series.)	—N/a
2023 World Championships	2	Matteo Zurloni (ITA); Long Jinbao (CHN)	2	Desak Made Rita Kusuma Dewi (INA); Emma Hunt (USA)
2023 European Qualifier	1	Bassa Mawem (FRA)	1	Aleksandra Mirosław (POL)
2023 Pan American Games	1	Samuel Watson (USA)	1	Piper Kelly (USA)
2023 Asian Qualifier	1	Rahmad Adi Mulyono (INA)	1	Deng Lijuan (CHN)
2023 Oceania Qualifier	1	Julian David (NZL)	1	Sarah Tetzlaff (NZL)
2023 African Qualifier	1	Joshua Bruyns (RSA)	1	Aniya Holder (RSA)
Olympic Qualifying Series	5	Wu Peng (CHN); Veddriq Leonardo (INA); Amir Maimuratov (KAZ); Zach Hammer (USA); Reza Alipour (IRI)	5	Zhou Yafei (CHN); Aleksandra Kałucka (POL); Rajiah Sallsabillah (INA); Capucine Viglione (FRA); Manon Lebon (FRA)
Universality places	0	—N/a	0	—N/a
Reallocation	2	Yaroslav Tkach (UKR); Shin Eun-cheol (KOR)	2	Leslie Romero Pérez (ESP); Beatrice Colli (ITA)
Total	14		14	
