= Julian David (climber) =

New Zealand speed climber

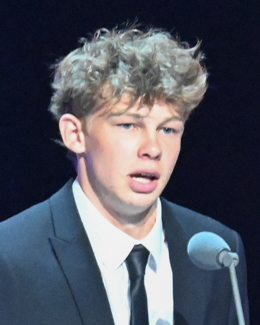
- David at the Halberg Awards in 2024

Personal information
- Born: 30 January 2005 (age 21) La Rochelle, France
- Home town: Tauranga, New Zealand
- Years active: 2022—present
- Height: 173 cm (5 ft 8 in)

Climbing career
- Type of climber: Competition speed climbing

Sport
- Country: New Zealand
- Coached by: Rob Moore

Julian David (born 30 January 2005) is a competition speed climber from New Zealand. He represented New Zealand at the 2024 Summer Olympics.

== Early life ==
David was born in La Rochelle, France, and moved to New Zealand at three years old. He started speed climbing in 2019.

== Career ==
In August 2023, David won the 2023 Youth World Championships in Seoul, South Korea, becoming New Zealand's first ever gold medal winner at the world championships.

In November 2023, David won the 2023 Oceania Qualifier in Melbourne, Australia, and qualified to represent New Zealand at the 2024 Summer Olympics. In February 2024, he won the Halberg Awards Emerging Talent Award.

During the Olympics, David advanced to the quarterfinals of the men's speed event, before being eliminated by Sam Watson.

== Major results ==
=== Olympic Games ===
Discipline	2024
Speed	8

=== World championships ===
Discipline	2023
Speed	62

=== World Cup ===
Discipline	2022	2023	2024
Speed	101	69	33

Awards
Preceded by Gustav Legnavsky	Halberg Awards – Emerging Talent Award; 2023	Succeeded by Tyler Bindon
