= Leslie Romero =

Spanish speed climber

Personal information
- Full name: Leslie Adriana Romero Pérez
- Nationality: Spanish
- Born: March 18, 1993 (age 33) San Juan de los Morros, Venezuela
- Years active: 2022–present
- Height: 160 cm (5 ft 3 in)

Sport
- Sport: Competition climbing
- Event: Competition speed climbing
- Coached by: David Macià

Leslie Adriana Romero Pérez (born 18 March 1998) is a Venezuelan-born Spanish competition climber who specializes in competition speed climbing. She was a finalist for the 2024 Spanish Olympic team in the speed climbing event.

== Early life ==
Romero was born in 1998 in San Juan de los Morros, Venezuela, with a Venezuelan mother and Spanish father from Málaga, giving her dual citizenship. After many years in Venezuela, she and her family moved to Mutxamel in Spain in 2019. Romero herself lives and trains in Sant Cugat del Vallès, near Barcelona.

As a child, she climbed her parents' fruit trees to reach the fruit. She began sport climbing at age six when her parents took her to a gym, and allowed her to try climbing after discovering that the gymnastics club they were intending for her had moved.

== Competition results ==
Climbing for Venezuela, Romero won first place for Youth B speed climbing in the 2012 IFSC Climbing World Youth Championships in Singapore, and first place for Youth A in the 2014 PanAmerican Youth Championship in Mexico City. After moving to Spain, Romero's best international results include first place at the 2022 International Federation of Sport Climbing (IFSC) European Continental Cup in Innsbruck, Austria, in June 2022, first place at the IFSC European Cup in Innsbruck in May 2023, first place at the IFSC European Cup in Žilina, Slovakia in July 2023, and first place at the IFSC European Cup in Innsbruck in June 2024.

She finished in 12th and 11th place at the Olympic Qualifier Series events in Shanghai and Budapest, respectively, and qualified for the Olympics in reallocation, after France took their allocated slot by placing higher in the competition. At the Olympics, Romero won her heat against Rajiah Sallsabillah in the elimination round of qualifications after Sallsabillah fell. Sallsabillah, the eventual fourth-place finisher, also continued into the finals as the heat loser with the fastest qualification time. Romero ended up in eighth place after losing in the quarterfinals to Aleksandra Mirosław, the world record holder and eventual gold medalist.

Her personal best time is 6.86, earned in July 2024 at an IFSC World Cup in Chamonix, France.

== Major results ==
=== Olympic Games ===
Discipline	2024
Speed	8

=== World championships ===
Discipline	2023
Speed	7

=== World Cup ===
Discipline	2022	2023	2024
Speed	48	23	12
