= Sport climbing at the 2022 Asian Games – Men's speed relay =

Men's speed relay at the 2022 Asian Games
- Venue: Keqiao Yangshan Sport Climbing Centre
- Date: 4 October 2023
- Competitors: 35 from 10 nations

Medalists
gold medal	China; Long Jinbao, Wang Xinshang, Wu Peng, Zhang Liang
silver medal	Indonesia; Aspar Jaelolo, Kiromal Katibin, Veddriq Leonardo, Rahmad Adi Mulyono
bronze medal	South Korea; Jung Yong-jun, Lee Seung-beom, Lee Yong-su

The men's competition speed climbing relay event at the 2022 Asian Games took place on 4 October 2023 at Keqiao Yangshan Sport Climbing Centre, Shaoxing, China.

== Schedule ==
All times are China Standard Time (UTC+08:00)

Date	Time	Event
Wednesday, 4 October 2023	11:00	Qualification
Wednesday, 4 October 2023	20:00	Quarterfinals
Wednesday, 4 October 2023	20:17	Semifinals
Wednesday, 4 October 2023	20:32	Finals

== Results ==
Legend

- FS — False start

=== Qualification ===
Rank	Team	Time
1	Indonesia (INA); Aspar Jaelolo; Kiromal Katibin; Veddriq Leonardo; Rahmad Adi Mulyono	16.632
2	China (CHN); Long Jinbao; Wang Xinshang; Wu Peng; Zhang Liang	16.762
3	Iran (IRI); Mehdi Alipour; Milad Alipour; Reza Alipour	17.743
4	Kazakhstan (KAZ); Beknur Altynbekov; Rishat Khaibullin; Amir Maimuratov; Alisher Murat	18.553
5	South Korea (KOR); Jung Yong-jun; Lee Seung-beom; Lee Yong-su	20.201
6	Singapore (SGP); Amar Hassan Kamal; Denzel Chua; Tan Bing Qian	20.293
7	Thailand (THA); Phanuphong Bunprakop; Sirapob Jirajaturapak; Aphiwit Limpanichpakdee; Thatthana Raksachat	20.484
8	Hong Kong (HKG); Au Chi Fung; Shoji Chan; Ho Cheuk Hei; Wong Cheuk Nam	21.080
9	Pakistan (PAK); Zaheer Ahmad; Mir Abuzar Faiz; Fazal Wadood	29.029
10	Mongolia (MGL); Battulgyn Bilgüün; Batzorigiin Mönkhbaatar; Chuluunbaataryn Mandakhbayar	38.912

=== Knockout round ===
Quarterfinals
1	Indonesia	17.979
8	Hong Kong	19.651
4	Kazakhstan	18.691
5	South Korea	18.025
2	China	19.144
7	Thailand	20.923
3	Iran	FS
6	Singapore	—

Semifinals
1	Indonesia	16.289
5	South Korea	16.650
2	China	16.152
6	Singapore	20.632

Final
1	Indonesia	FS
2	China	—
Small final
5	South Korea	17.827
6	Singapore	23.169
