= Matteo Zurloni =

Italian speed climber (born 2002)

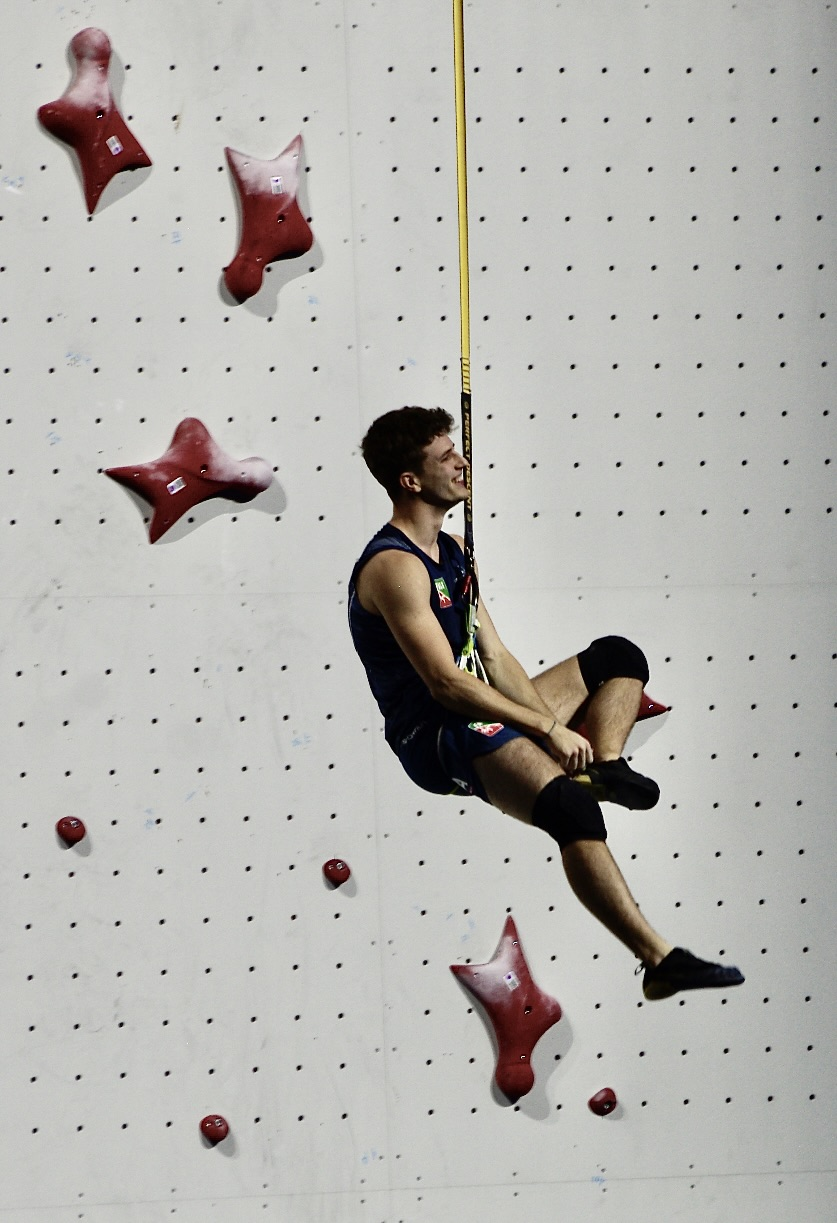
- Zurloni in 2023

Personal information
- Nationality: Italian
- Born: 20 March 2002 (age 24) Segrate, Italy
- Home town: Cassano d'Adda, Italy
- Years active: 2018—present
- Height: 175 cm (5 ft 9 in)

Sport
- Country: Italy
- Sport: Competition speed climbing
- Event: Speed
- Club: Fiamme Oro
- Coached by: Stanislao Zama
Medal record
Men's competition climbing
Representing Italy
World Championships
Gold medal – first place	2023 Bern	Speed
European Championships
Silver medal – second place	2024 Villars	Speed

Matteo Zurloni (born 20 March 2002) is an Italian competition speed climber. He won the speed event at the 2023 IFSC Climbing World Championships, qualifying him for the 2024 Summer Olympics.

== Career ==
At the 2024 Summer Olympics in Paris, Zurloni won by 0.01 seconds his heat against China's Long Jinbao in the elimination round of qualifications. Zurloni ended up in sixth place after losing 0.002 seconds in the quarterfinals to another China's Wu Peng, the eventual silver medalist.

== Major results ==
=== Olympic Games ===
Discipline	2024
Speed	6

=== World championships ===
Discipline	2023
Speed	1

=== World Cup ===
Discipline	2022	2023	2024
Speed	69	14	2

=== European championships ===
Discipline	2022	2024
Speed	12	2
