= Sport climbing at the 2024 Summer Olympics – Men's speed =

Men's speed at the Games of the XXXIII Olympiad
- Olympic sport climbing
- Venue: Le Bourget Sport Climbing Venue, Paris
- Dates: 6 August 2024 (qualification); 8 August 2024 (final)
- Competitors: 14 from 11 nations

Medalists
1st place, gold medalist(s)		Veddriq Leonardo	Indonesia
2nd place, silver medalist(s)		Wu Peng	China
3rd place, bronze medalist(s)		Sam Watson	United States

The men's competition speed climbing event at the 2024 Summer Olympics took place from 6 to 8 August 2024 at Le Bourget Sport Climbing Venue in Paris.

== Records ==
Prior to this competition, the existing world and Olympic records were as follows:

World Best
World record	Sam Watson (USA)	4.79	Wujiang, China	12 April 2024
Olympic record	Bassa Mawem (France)	5.45	Tokyo, Japan	2 August 2021

== Schedule ==
All times are Central European Time (UTC+02:00)

Date	Time	Event
6 August 2024	13:00	Qualification Seeding
6 August 2024	13:35	Qualification Elimination heats
8 August 2024	12:35	Quarterfinals
8 August 2024	12:43	Semifinals
8 August 2024	12:51	Bronze medal match
8 August 2024	12:54	Final

== Results ==
=== Qualification Seeding ===
Rank	Athlete	Lane A	Lane B	Best Time	Notes
1	Veddriq Leonardo (INA)	4.79	4.92	4.79	WR
2	Amir Maimuratov (KAZ)	4.89	8.45	4.89	PB
3	Sam Watson (USA)	4.91	5.29	4.91	
4	Matteo Zurloni (ITA)	5.16	4.94	4.94	PB
5	Wu Peng (CHN)	5.01	5.07	5.01	
6	Reza Alipour (IRI)	5.06	5.18	5.06	
7	Yaroslav Tkach (UKR)	5.11	5.13	5.11	
8	Bassa Mawem (FRA)	5.18	5.16	5.16	PB
9	Julian David (NZL)	5.24	7.33	5.24	PB
10	Shin Eun-cheol (KOR)	5.25	6.52	5.25	
11	Long Jinbao (CHN)	6.09	5.29	5.29	
12	Zach Hammer (USA)	6.05	6.06	6.05	
13	Joshua Bruyns (RSA)	6.18	Fall	6.18	
14	Rahmad Adi Mulyono (INA)	FS	5.07	FS	

=== Qualification Elimination Heats ===
Heat	Lane	Athlete	Time	Notes
1	A	Veddriq Leonardo (INA)	4.98	Q
1	B	Rahmad Adi Mulyono (INA)	5.13	
2	A	Amir Maimuratov (KAZ)	4.94	Q
2	B	Joshua Bruyns (RSA)	5.84	
3	A	Sam Watson (USA)	4.75	Q, WR
3	B	Zach Hammer (USA)	Fall	
4	A	Matteo Zurloni (ITA)	5.06	Q
4	B	Long Jinbao (CHN)	5.18	
5	A	Wu Peng (CHN)	5.00	Q
5	B	Shin Eun-cheol (KOR)	7.24	
6	A	Reza Alipour (IRI)	5.26	q
6	B	Julian David (NZL)	5.20	Q, PB
7	A	Yaroslav Tkach (UKR)	5.17	
7	B	Bassa Mawem (FRA)	5.16	Q, PB

=== Knockout stage ===
Quarterfinals
Sam Watson (USA)	5.03
Julian David (NZL)	5.65
Matteo Zurloni (ITA)	4.997
Wu Peng (CHN)	4.995
Veddriq Leonardo (INA)	4.88
Bassa Mawem (FRA)	5.26
Amir Maimuratov (KAZ)	6.14
Reza Alipour (IRI)	5.57

Semifinals
Sam Watson (USA)	4.93
Wu Peng (CHN)	4.85
Veddriq Leonardo (INA)	4.78 PB
Reza Alipour (IRI)	4.84 PB

Final
Wu Peng (CHN)	4.77 PB
Veddriq Leonardo (INA)	4.75 PB
Bronze medal match
Sam Watson (USA)	4.74 WR
Reza Alipour (IRI)	4.88

== Final standing ==
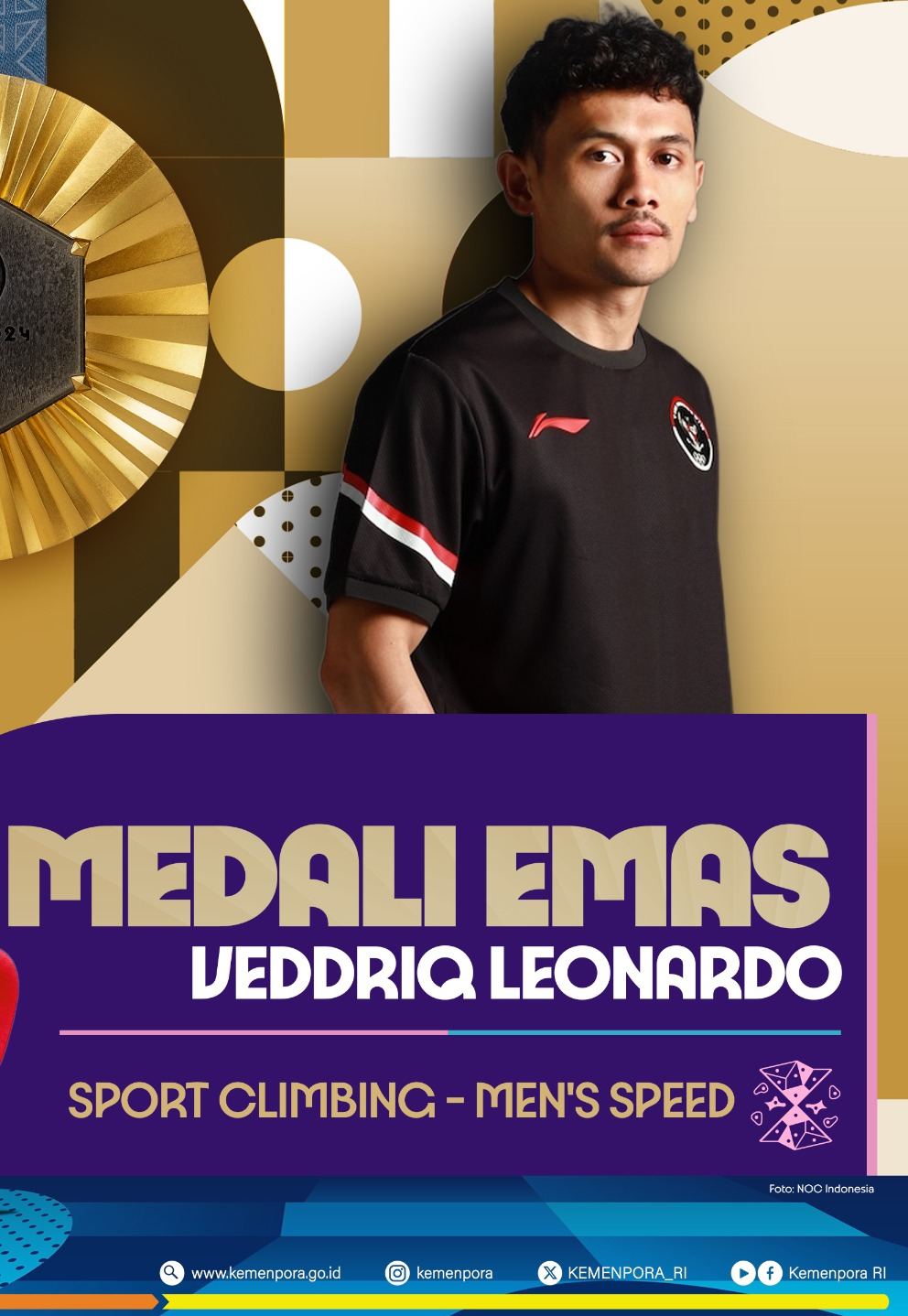

Rank	Athlete
1st place, gold medalist(s)	Veddriq Leonardo (INA)
2nd place, silver medalist(s)	Wu Peng (CHN)
3rd place, bronze medalist(s)	Sam Watson (USA)
4	Reza Alipour (IRI)
5	Amir Maimuratov (KAZ)
6	Matteo Zurloni (ITA)
7	Bassa Mawem (FRA)
8	Julian David (NZL)
9	Yaroslav Tkach (UKR)
10	Rahmad Adi Mulyono (INA)
11	Long Jinbao (CHN)
12	Shin Eun-cheol (KOR)
13	Joshua Bruyns (RSA)
14	Zach Hammer (USA)

== See also ==
- Sport climbing at the 2024 Summer Olympics – Women's speed
