= Aniya Holder =

South African climber (born 2001)

Personal information
- Born: 3 August 2001 (age 24) Grahamstown, South Africa
- Home town: Port Elizabeth, South Africa
- Height: 1.75 m (5 ft 9 in)
- Weight: 75 kg (165 lb)

Climbing career
- Type of climber: Competition climbing, speed climbing
- World finals: IFSC African Continental Champion in 2023 (speed)
Medal record
Women's competition climbing
Representing South Africa
African Championships
Bronze medal – third place	2021 Johannesburg	Bouldering
Bronze medal – third place	2021 Johannesburg	Lead

Aniya Holder (born 3 August 2001) is a South African rock climber who specializes in competition climbing, particularly speed climbing. As of 2024, Holder is the reigning female African Continental Champion in women's speed climbing, and represented South Africa in speed cllimbing at the 2024 Summer Olympics.

== Early life ==
Holder was born on 3 August 2001 in Grahamstown (now Makhanda), South Africa. She grew up in Makhanda as one of seven children, and her father was a director of music at Kingswood College. Holder was homeschooled and tried both dancing and karate before picking up climbing at age 14. She began climbing at a small wall at Rhodes University and started joining the university's club on outdoor climbing trips at 16.

== Competitive climbing career ==
Holder participated in her first competitive climbing event at 17 and originally kept to the boulder and lead categories. In 2021, however, she fractured her knuckles by punching a volume hold on the wall. Soon after partially healing from that injury, Holder dislocated her elbow while bouldering, which necessitated five months' rest to rehabilitate. Her coach, Jay-D Muller, suggested that she try speed climbing as a less painful and less injury-prone alternative to boulder and lead. Holder has said that "[speed climbing] doesn't have such hard, compressed moves – it's more running up the wall." She began speed climbing in October 2022 and took a liking to it, despite the poor facilities available to her — the international standard route is 15 meters, but the gym in Gqeberha only has a 6-meter wall, which must be changed every 1–3 months to resemble each third of the official route. In late 2023, she entered her first-ever speed climbing competition and won.

Holder won first-place in the International Federation of Sport Climbing (IFSC)'s 2023 African Continental Championship, but initially began training for it without realizing the event was a qualifier for the 2024 Summer Olympics. At the competition, held in Pretoria in December 2023, she qualified for the speed climbing event's final round with a time of 11.89 seconds, and won the final with a time of 11.33 seconds, over two seconds faster than second-place finisher Tegwen Oates.

Holder is the only woman representing an African nation in the speed climbing event at the 2024 Paris Summer Olympics. She is joined on Team South Africa by fellow speed climber Joshua Bruyns as well as boulder-and-lead combined climbers Lauren Mukheibir and Mel Janse van Rensburg. In the qualification seeding rounds of the Paris Olympics, held in Le Bourget, Holder achieved a new personal best time of 9.12 seconds and received the 14th seed for the elimination rounds. Holder exited the competition later that same day, posting a 9.36–second run in a round where she was eliminated by Aleksandra Mirosław, the event's current world record holder.

== Personal life ==
As of 2024, Holder lives in Gqeberha and works full-time as a route-setter and coach at the local climbing gym. She is also a visual artist. Holder's father Stephen, a former director of music at Kingswood College, died in 2020 during the COVID-19 lockdown. Stephen never got to see Aniya compete or climb outdoors, so she painted a portrait of him on her chalk bag in remembrance.

== Major results ==
=== Olympic Games ===
Discipline	2024
Speed	14

=== World Cup ===
Discipline	2024
Speed	57

=== African championships ===
Discipline	2021
Boulder	3
Lead	3
