= Sport climbing at the 2018 Asian Games – Men's speed relay =

Men's speed relay at the 2018 Asian Games
- Venue: Jakabaring Sport City
- Date: 27 August 2018
- Competitors: 47 from 9 nations

Medalists
gold medal	Indonesia; Muhammad Hinayah, Veddriq Leonardo, Rindi Sufriyanto, Abudzar Yulianto
silver medal	Indonesia; Muhammad Fajri Alfian, Aspar Jaelolo, Sabri, Septo Wibowo Siburian
bronze medal	China; Li Jinxin, Liang Rongqi, Ou Zhiyong

The men's competition speed climbing relay event at the 2018 Asian Games took place on 27 August at Jakabaring Sport City, Palembang, Indonesia.

== Schedule ==
All times are Western Indonesia Time (UTC+07:00)

Date	Time	Event
Monday, 27 August 2018	17:15	Qualification
Monday, 27 August 2018	19:15	Quarterfinals
Monday, 27 August 2018	19:15	Semifinals
Monday, 27 August 2018	19:15	Finals

== Results ==
Legend

- FS — False start

=== Qualification ===
Rank	Team	Time
1	Indonesia 1 (INA); Muhammad Fajri Alfian; Aspar Jaelolo; Sabri; Septo Wibowo Siburian	19.373
2	China 2 (CHN); Li Jinxin; Liang Rongqi; Ou Zhiyong	19.868
3	Indonesia 2 (INA); Muhammad Hinayah; Veddriq Leonardo; Rindi Sufriyanto; Abudzar Yulianto	19.982
4	Iran 1 (IRI); Mehdi Alipour; Reza Alipour; Ehsan Asrar	20.325
5	China 1 (CHN); Duan Yurong; Li Guangfeng; Lin Penghui; Zhong Qixin	21.227
6	Kazakhstan 1 (KAZ); Rishat Khaibullin; Roman Kostyukov; Amir Maimuratov	22.557
7	Kazakhstan 2 (KAZ); Alexey Molchanov; Alisher Murat; Alexandr Nigmatulin	24.202
8	Thailand 1 (THA); Phanuphong Bunprakop; Thatthana Raksachat; Winai Ruangrit; Kritsadakorn Thongmung	25.471
9	Hong Kong 1 (HKG); Au Chi Fung; Shoji Chan; Lam Hei Yeung; Yau Ka Chun	26.122
10	South Korea 2 (KOR); Choi Seung-bin; Kim Han-wool; Son Jong-seok	26.192
11	Singapore 1 (SGP); Amar Hassan Kamal; Emmanuel Ryan Paul; Tay Kuan Liang	26.289
12	Malaysia 1 (MAS); Ghalib Azimi; Izzat Shokor; Taqiuddin Zulkifli	28.656
13	Thailand 2 (THA); Teeraphon Boondech; Sirapob Jirajaturapak; Sorakarn Thongjaras	34.509
14	South Korea 1 (KOR); Lee Seung-beom; Lee Yong-su; Son Min	Fall

=== Knockout round ===
Quarterfinals
1	Indonesia 1	20.091
8	Thailand 1	24.003
4	Iran 1	24.251
5	China 1	20.754
2	China 2	20.792
7	Kazakhstan 2	25.645
3	Indonesia 2	19.793
6	Kazakhstan 1	26.018

Semifinals
1	Indonesia 1	19.205
5	China 1	19.874
2	China 2	Fall
3	Indonesia 2	18.998

Final
1	Indonesia 1	FS
3	Indonesia 2	18.686
Small final
5	China 1	FS
2	China 2	21.646
