= Amir Maimuratov =

Kazakhstani speed climber

Personal information
- Native name: Әмір Маймұратов
- Born: 19 July 1995 (age 31) Astana, Kazakhstan
- Years active: 2009—present
- Height: 182 cm (6 ft 0 in)

Climbing career
- Type of climber: Competition speed climbing

Sport
- Country: Kazakhstan
- Club: CSKA
Medal record
Men's competition climbing
Representing Kazakhstan
Asian Championships
Silver medal – second place	2024 Tai'an	Speed

Amir Maimuratov (born 19 July 1995) is a Kazakhstani competition speed climber. He represented Kazakhstan at the 2024 Summer Olympics.

== Early life ==
Maimuratov attended Kazakh-British Technical University.

== Career ==
During the 2024 Olympic Qualifier Series in Budapest, Maimuratov finished in second place with a time of 4.95 seconds. He finished third overall in the Olympic Qualifier Series rankings and qualified to represent Kazakhstan at the 2024 Summer Olympics.

During the men's speed climbing event, he finished in second place in the qualification round with a personal best time of 4.89 seconds. He defeated Joshua Bruyns in the elimination round to advance to the quarterfinals, and finished in fifth place after losing in the quarterfinals to Reza Alipour.

== Major results ==
=== Olympic Games ===
Discipline	2024
Speed	5

=== World championships ===
Discipline	2011	2012	2014	2016	2018	2019	2021	2023
Speed	70	52	19	—	16	15	12	27

=== World Cup ===
Discipline	2014	2015	2016	2017	2018	2019	2021	2022	2023	2024
Speed	38	10	—	46	31	31	28	23	24	9
Combined	—	—	128	—	—	—	—	—	—	—

=== Asian championships ===
Discipline	2013	2014	2015	2016	2017	2018	2019	2022	2024
Speed	4	—	—	5	—	8	13	34	2
Bouldering	—	—	—	—	—	—	42	—	—
Lead	—	—	—	—	—	—	39	—	—
Combined	—	—	—	—	—	—	19	—	—
