= Mickaël Mawem =

French rock climber (born 1990)

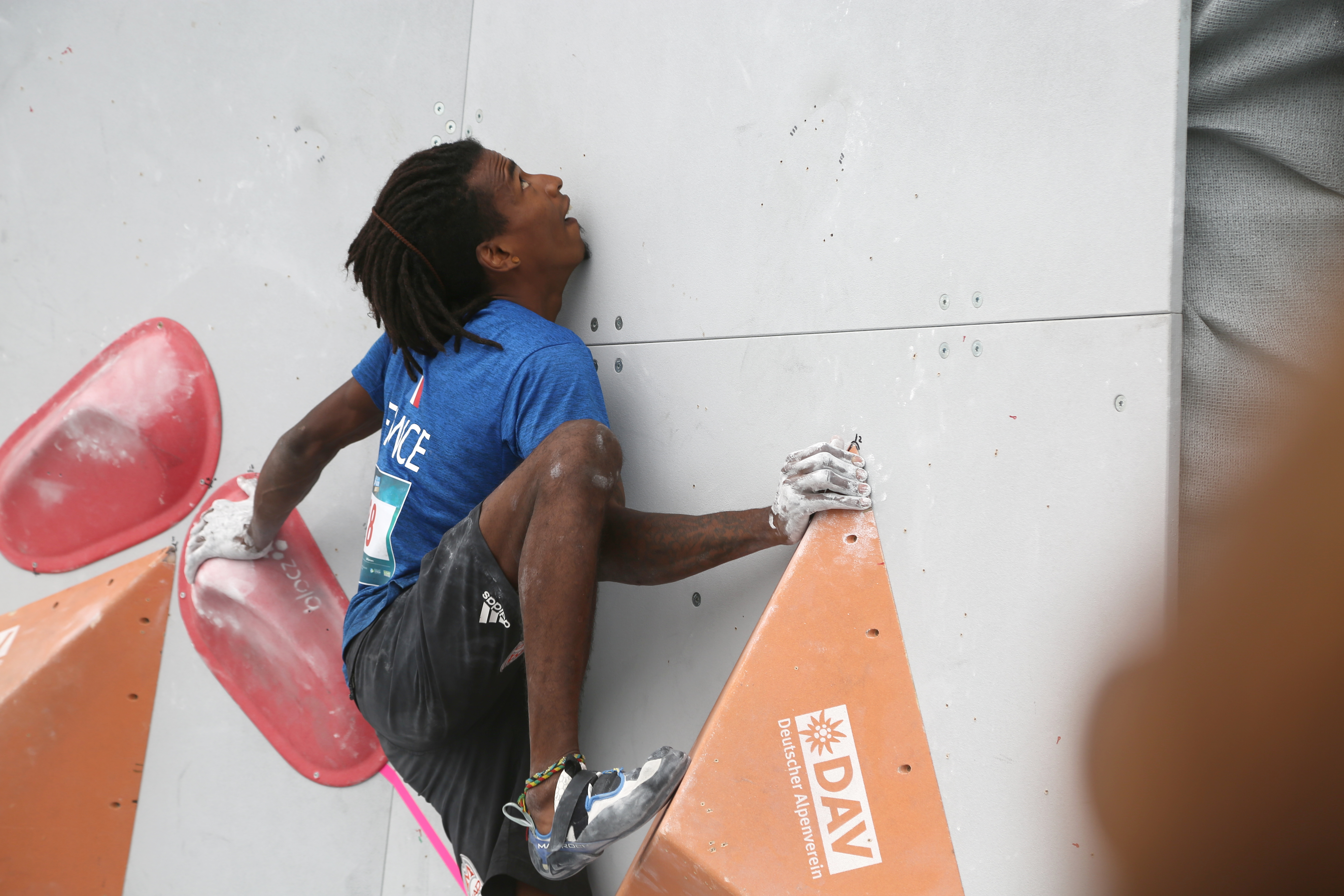

Personal information
- Nationality: French
- Born: 3 August 1990 (age 36) Nîmes, France
- Occupation: Professional rock climber

Climbing career
- Type of climber: Competition climbing
Medal record
Men's competition climbing
Representing France
World Championships
Gold medal – first place	2023 Bern	Bouldering

Mickaël Mawem (born 3 August 1990 at Nimes, France) is a French professional rock climber who specializes in competition bouldering. He is the 2023 World boulder champion. He qualified for the 2020 Summer Olympics by finishing 7th at the 2019 IFSC Climbing World Championships. He also won the bouldering event in the 2019 IFSC Climbing European Championships, and at the 2023 World Championships at Bern.

Mawem was first selected for the national team in 2014.

== Personal life ==
His older brother Bassa is also a professional rock climber.
