= Veddriq Leonardo =

Indonesian speed climber (born 1997)

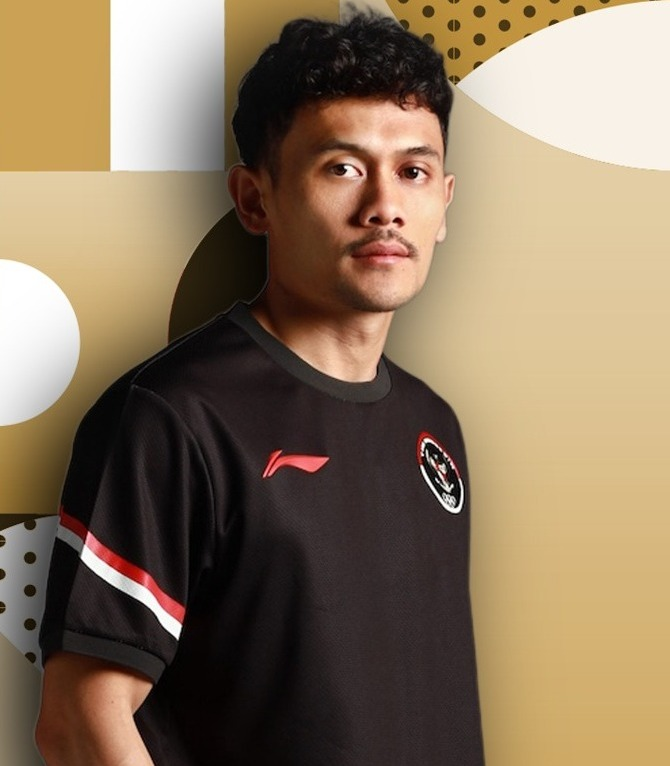
- Leonardo in 2024

Personal information
- Born: 11 March 1997 (age 29) Pontianak, West Kalimantan, Indonesia
- Education: Tanjungpura University

Climbing career
- Type of climber: Competition speed climbing
Medal record
Men's competition climbing
Representing Indonesia
Olympic Games
Gold medal – first place	2024 Paris	Speed
World Games
Gold medal – first place	2022 Birmingham	Speed
World Cup (Season)
Winner	2021	Speed
Winner	2022	Speed
Winner	2023	Speed
Asian Games
Gold medal – first place	2018 Jakarta–Palembang	Speed relay
Silver medal – second place	2022 Hangzhou	Speed relay
Bronze medal – third place	2022 Hangzhou	Speed
Asian Championships
Gold medal – first place	2019 Bogor	Speed
Silver medal – second place	2019 Bogor	Speed relay
Silver medal – second place	2022 Seoul	Speed
Bronze medal – third place	2026 Meishan	Speed

Veddriq Leonardo (born 11 March 1997) is an Indonesian competition speed climber. He has held the world record for the discipline for about a year twice, first after setting it en route to winning the men's speed climbing event at the 2021 IFSC Climbing World Cup in Salt Lake City, and again at the 2023 IFSC Climbing World Cup in Seoul. He is the current Olympic champion, having won speed climbing in 2024, thus becoming the first Indonesian non-badminton Olympic gold medalist.

He was first introduced to competition speed climbing in his first year of high school. In 2014, he participated in his first national championship in Tanjung Balai Karimun, where he was finished the top eight. In 2016, he won his first medal (bronze) in the junior national championship in Bangka Belitung. His first international event was 2018 Moscow World Cup where he placed third.

== Achievements ==
=== Olympic Games ===
Men's speed

Year	Venue	Opponent	Time (s)	Result	Ref
2024	Le Bourget, Paris, France	(China) Wu Peng	4.75–4.77	Gold	

=== World Games ===
Men's speed

Year	Venue	Opponent	Time (s)	Result	Ref
2022	Sloss Furnaces, Birmingham, United States	(Indonesia) Kiromal Katibin	7.230–fall	(gold) Gold	

=== Asian Games ===
Men's speed

Year	Venue	Opponent	Time (s)	Result	Ref
2022	Keqiao Yangshan Sport Climbing Centre, Shaoxing, China	(China) Wu Peng	4.955–5.119	(bronze) Bronze	

Men's speed relay

Year	Venue	Partner	Opponent	Time (s)	Result	Ref
2018	Jakabaring Sport City, Palembang, Indonesia	(Indonesia) Muhammad Hinayah (Indonesia) Rindi Sufriyanto (Indonesia) Abudzar Yulianto	(Indonesia) Muhammad Fajri Alfian (Indonesia) Aspar Jaelolo (Indonesia) Sabri (Indonesia) Septo Wibowo Siburian	18.686–fall	(gold) Gold	
2022	Keqiao Yangshan Sport Climbing Centre, Shaoxing, China	(Indonesia) Kiromal Katibin (Indonesia) Rahmad Adi Mulyono (Indonesia) Aspar Jaelolo	(China) Wang Xinshang (China) Wu Peng (China) Zhang Liang (China) Long Jinbao	FS–W	(silver) Silver	

=== Asian Championships ===
Men's speed

Year	Venue	Opponent	Time (s)	Result	Ref
2019	Pakansari Stadium, Bogor, Indonesia	(Indonesia) Kiromal Katibin	5.460–5.547	(gold) Gold	
2022	Seoul, South Korea	(South Korea) Lee Seung-beom	6.04–5.91	(silver) Silver	

Men's speed relay

Year	Venue	Partner	Opponent	Time (s)	Result	Ref
2019	Pakansari Stadium, Bogor, Indonesia	(Indonesia) Kiromal Katibin (Indonesia) Zaenal Aripin	(Indonesia) Sabri (Indonesia) Rahmad Adi Mulyono (Indonesia) Fatchur Roji	fall–23.492	(silver) Silver	

=== IFSC Climbing World Cup ===
Men's speed

Year	Venue	Opponent	Time (s)	Result	Ref
2018	Moscow, Russia	(Indonesia) Muhammad Hinayah	wc–fs	(bronze) Bronze	
2021	Salt Lake City, United States	(Indonesia) Kiromal Katibin	5.208–fall	(gold) Gold	
2021	Villars, Switzerland	(Russia) Dmitri Timofeev	5.329–7.35	(gold) Gold	
2022	Seoul, South Korea	(Indonesia) Kiromal Katibin	6.965–fall	(gold) Gold	
2022	Salt Lake City (I), United States	(Italy) Ludovico Fossali	5.595–fall	(bronze) Bronze	
2022	Salt Lake City (II), United States	(Austria) Tobias Plangger	6.330–fall	(gold) Gold	
2023	Seoul, South Korea	(China) Long Jinbao	5.01–5.12	(gold) Gold	
2023	Salt Lake City, United States	(China) Wu Peng	4.95–6.99	(gold) Gold	
2026	Chamonix, France	(Indonesia) Antasyafi Robby Al Hilmi	4.89–5.11	(gold) Gold	

=== Other international competitions ===
Men's speed

Year	Venue	Opponent	Time (s)	Result	Ref
2019	The Belt and Road International, Qinghai, China	(China) Ou Zhiyong	5.60–?	(gold) Gold	
2023	Neom Beach Games, Neom, Saudi Arabia	(Ukraine) Yaroslav Tkach	5.077–5.347	(gold) Gold	
2024	IFSC Madrid 4 Speed, Madrid, Spain	(Indonesia) Rahmad Adi Mulyono	5.06–5.14	(gold) Gold	

Men's 4 speed

Year	Tournament	Opponent	Time (s)	Opponents time (s)	Result	Ref
2024	IFSC Madrid 4 Speed, Madrid, Spain	(China) Long Jianguo	5.11	4.98	(bronze) Bronze	
2024	IFSC Madrid 4 Speed, Madrid, Spain	(Kazakhstan) Amir Maimuratov	5.11	4.90	(bronze) Bronze	
2024	IFSC Madrid 4 Speed, Madrid, Spain	(United States) Zach Hammer	5.11	9.55	(bronze) Bronze	

Men's speed relay

Year	Tournament	Partner	Opponent	Time (s)	Result	Ref
2024	IFSC Madrid 4 Speed, Madrid, Spain	(Indonesia) Kiromal Katibin	(China) Long Jinbao (China) Long Jianguo	10.235–fall	(gold) Gold	

== World records ==
Men's World Record History
Date	Time (s)	Location	Competition
28 April 2023	4.90	Seoul, South Korea	World Cup
28 April 2023	4.984	Seoul, South Korea	World Cup
28 May 2021	5.20	Salt Lake City, United States	World Cup

== Rankings ==
=== IFSC Climbing World Cup ===
Discipline	2021	2022	2023	2024	2025
Speed	1	1	1	15	17

== Number of medals in the Climbing World Cup ==
=== Speed ===
Season	Gold	Silver	Bronze	Total
2018			1	1
2021	2			2
2022	2		1	3
2023	2			2
2026	1			1
Total	7		2	9

== Awards and nominations ==
Awards	Year	Category	Nominee/work	Result	Ref.
Santini JebreeetMedia Awards	2024	Favorite Male Athlete	Veddriq Leonardo	Nominated	
The World Games	2024	Athlete of the Year	Veddriq Leonardo	Won	
