= Miho Nonaka =

Japanese rock climber (born 1997)

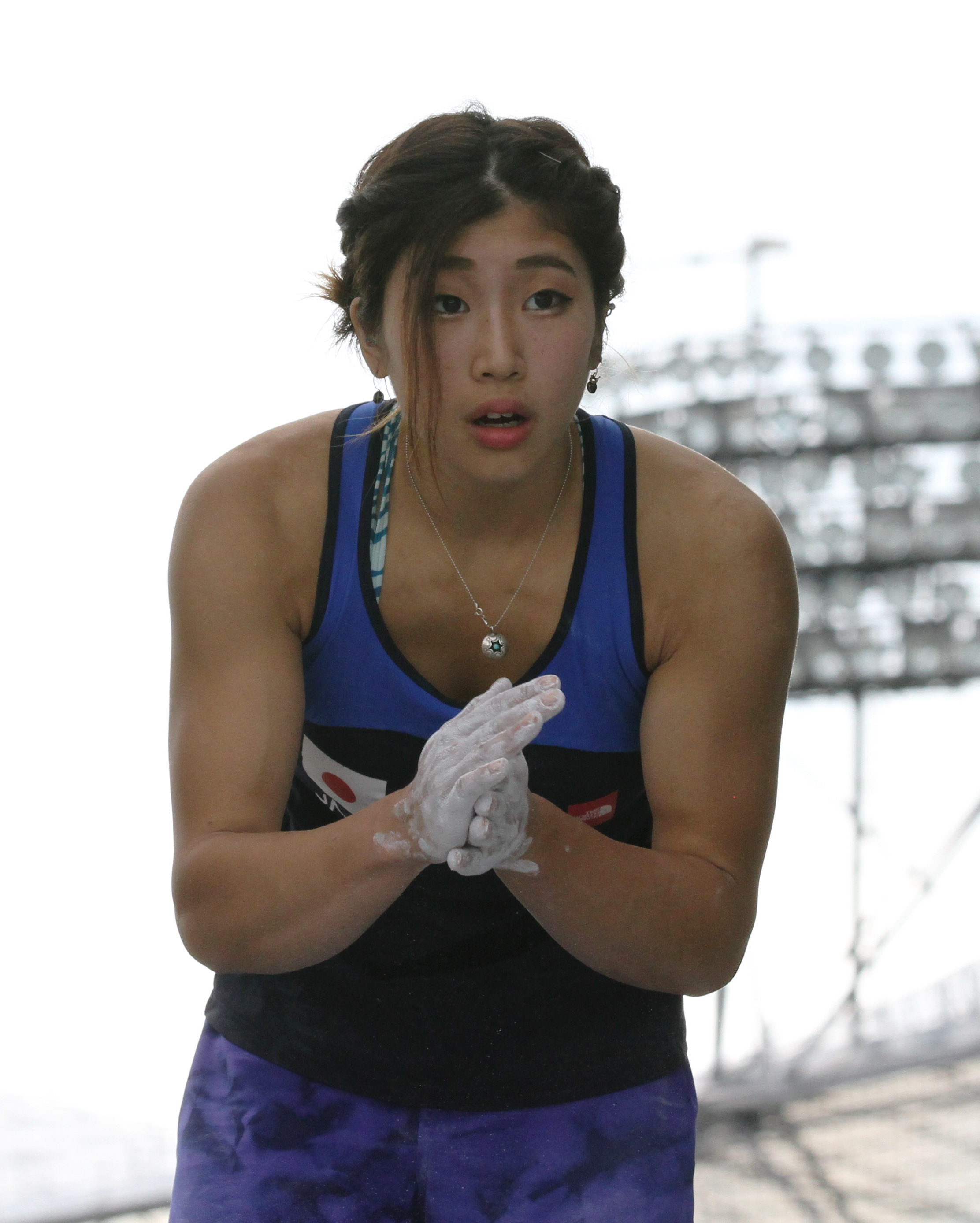
- Nonaka at the Bouldering World Cup, Munich, 2015

Personal information
- Nationality: Japanese
- Born: May 21, 1997 (age 29) Tokyo, Japan
- Occupation: Professional climber
- Height: 163 cm (5 ft 4 in)

Climbing career
- Type of climber: Competition climbing
- Highest grade: Redpoint: 8c+ (5.14c)
- Known for: Winner of overall Boulder World Cup title in 2018; 2020 Olympic silver medalist
Medal record
Women's competition climbing
Representing Japan
Olympic Games
| Silver medal – second place | 2020 Tokyo | Combined |
World Championships
| Silver medal – second place | 2016 Paris | Bouldering |
World Cup
| First place | 2023 Seoul | Bouldering |
| First place | 2018 Meiringen | Bouldering |
| First place | 2016 Munich | Bouldering |
| First place | 2016 Navi Mumbai | Bouldering |
| Second place | 2022 Innsbruck | Bouldering |
| Second place | 2018 Munich | Bouldering |
| Second place | 2018 Vail | Bouldering |
| Second place | 2018 Hachioji | Bouldering |
| Second place | 2017 Navi Mumbai | Bouldering |
| Second place | 2016 Paris | Bouldering |
| Third place | 2025 Bern | Bouldering |
| Third place | 2023 Innsbruck | Bouldering |
| Third place | 2022 Salt Lake City | Bouldering |
| Third place | 2021 Salt Lake City | Speed |
| Third place | 2017 Vail | Bouldering |
| Third place | 2017 Tokyo | Bouldering |
| Third place | 2017 Meiringen | Bouldering |
| Third place | 2016 Innsbruck | Bouldering |
| Third place | 2016 Kazo | Bouldering |
Asian Championships
| Gold medal – first place | 2014 Lombok | Bouldering |
| Gold medal – first place | 2015 Ningbo | Bouldering |
| Silver medal – second place | 2018 Kurayoshi | Combined |
| Silver medal – second place | 2024 Tai'an | Bouldering |

Miho Nonaka (野中 生萌, Nonaka Mihō; born May 21, 1997) is a Japanese competition climber who specializes in competition bouldering. She is an Olympic silver medalist in sport climbing.

== Early life ==
Nonaka grew up in Tokyo, and was introduced to climbing by her father and older sister when she was eight years old.

== Climbing career ==
In 2013, Nonaka began competing on the international senior circuit at IFSC Climbing World Cups at age 16, initially focusing on competition lead climbing.

In 2014, Nonaka transitioned towards competition bouldering, winning her first World Cup medal with a second-place finish at the Boulder World Cup in Laval and eventually finishing the World Cup season in fifth place in the overall ranking for bouldering.

Nonaka continued to move up the overall rankings for bouldering in the following World Cup seasons, finishing in third place in 2015 and second place in 2016. She won her first World Cup gold medal at the Boulder World Cup in Navi Mumbai in 2016.

In 2018, Nonaka won the overall title in the Boulder World Cup by earning a place on the podium at every World Cup that season, winning one gold medal and six silver medals.

In 2019, Nonaka was deemed by the IFSC to have qualified to compete at the 2020 Summer Olympics in Tokyo by finishing in fifth place in the combined event at the 2019 IFSC Climbing World Championships. In December 2020, Nonaka's Olympic berth was confirmed after a dispute between the IFSC and the Japan Mountaineering and Sport Climbing Association was resolved in Nonaka's favor.

In preparation to compete in the combined event at the 2020 Summer Olympics (postponed to 2021), Nonaka competed at bouldering, lead climbing, and speed climbing events during the 2021 IFSC Climbing World Cup season, making finals across all disciplines and winning a bronze medal at the Speed World Cup in Salt Lake City. At the Olympics, Nonaka won a silver medal in the combined event.

Nonaka followed up her Olympic medal with two straight second-place finishes in the overall rankings of the Boulder World Cup in 2022 and 2023.

In 2024, Nonaka placed second in the rankings of the combined bouldering and lead climbing event at the Olympic Qualifier Series, securing a spot for the combined event at the 2024 Summer Olympics in Paris. At the Olympics, she finished in ninth place in the semifinals of the combined event and did not move on to finals.

== Notable ascents ==
On September 15, 2021, Nonaka redpointed Mr. Hyde 8c+ (5.14c) in Céüse, France. She noted on her instagram that her previous best was a 7c+ (5.13a).

In 2024 she climbed The Buttermilker Sit 8b (5.13d) in Bishop, California.

== Other activities ==
In 2025 Nonaka opened a climbing gym called Next Gen in Niiza, Saitama.

Nonaka is an ambassador for SpoGomi a competitive litter-picking sport started in Japan.

== Rankings ==
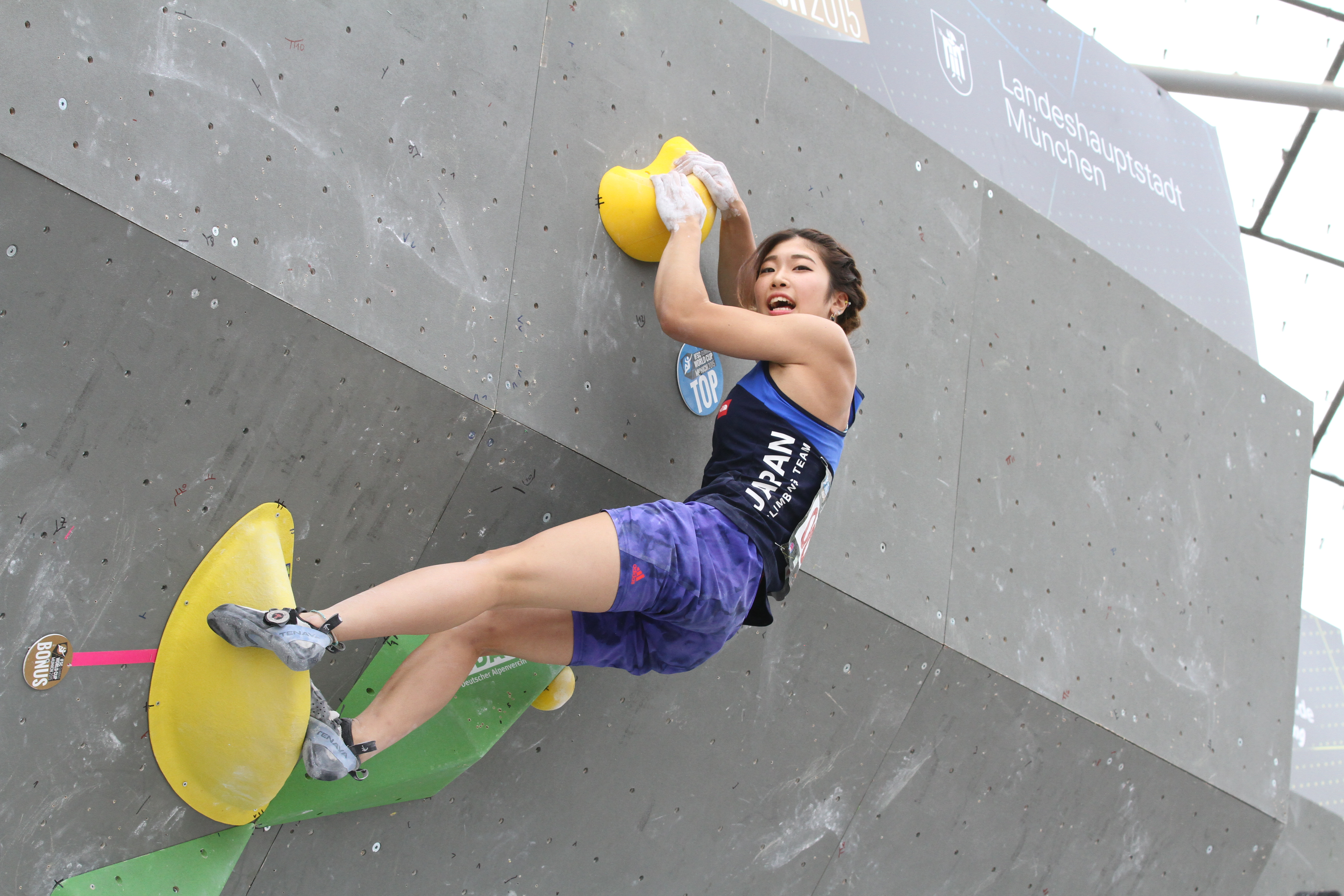
Nonaka at the Bouldering World Cup, Munich, 2015

Nonaka lead climbing at the Climbing World Championships, 2018

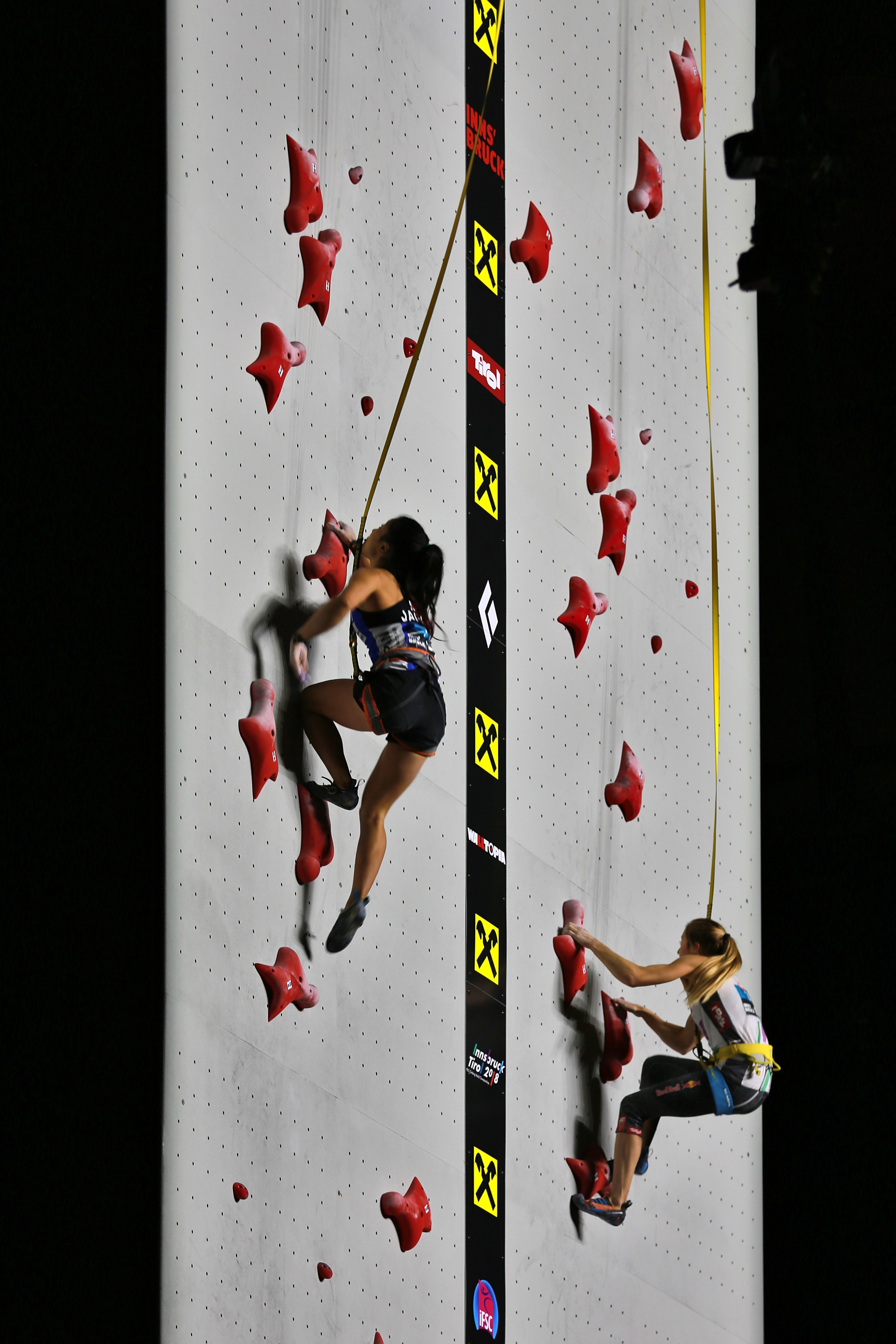
Nonaka speed climbing at the Climbing World Championships, 2018

=== Climbing World Cup ===
| Discipline | 2013 | 2014 | 2015 | 2016 | 2017 | 2018 | 2019 | 2021 | 2022 | 2023 | 2024 | 2025 |
|---|---|---|---|---|---|---|---|---|---|---|---|---|
| Lead | 42 | 55 | – | – | 46 | 23 | 19 | 26 | – | 14 | 51 | 49 |
| Bouldering | – | 5 | 3 | 2 | 4 | 1 | 15 | 5 | 2 | 2 | 21 | 7 |
| Speed | – | – | – | – | – | 43 | 30 | 9 | – | – | – | – |
| Combined | | 5 | – | – | 8 | 3 | 4 | | | 6 | – | – |

=== Climbing World Championships ===
Youth

| Discipline | 2015 Juniors | 2016 Juniors |
|---|---|---|
| Bouldering | 2 | 4 |

Adult

| Discipline | 2014 | 2016 | 2018 | 2019 | 2023 | 2025 |
|---|---|---|---|---|---|---|
| Lead | – | – | 16 | 26 | 8 | – |
| Bouldering | 15 | 2 | 5 | 5 | 24 | 9 |
| Speed | – | – | 25 | 25 | – | – |
| Combined | – | – | 5 | 5 | 7 | – |

== World Cup podiums ==
=== Bouldering ===
| Season | Gold | Silver | Bronze | Total |
|---|---|---|---|---|
| 2014 | | 1 | | 1 |
| 2015 | | 1 | | 1 |
| 2016 | 2 | | 3 | 5 |
| 2017 | | 1 | 4 | 5 |
| 2018 | 1 | 6 | | 7 |
| 2021 | | | 1 | 1 |
| 2022 | | 1 | 2 | 3 |
| 2023 | 1 | | 1 | 2 |
| 2025 | | | 1 | 1 |
| Total | 4 | 10 | 12 | 26 |

=== Speed ===
| Season | Gold | Silver | Bronze | Total |
|---|---|---|---|---|
| 2021 | | | 1 | 1 |
| Total | | | 1 | 1 |
