= Rahmad Adi Mulyono =

Indonesian climber (born 2000)

Personal information
- Nickname: Adi
- Born: 31 October 2000 (age 25) Surabaya, East Java, Indonesia
- Home town: Surabaya, East Java, Indonesia
- Height: 168 cm (5 ft 6 in)

Sport
- Country: Indonesia
- Sport: competition climbing
- Event: Speed
- Club: Federasi Panjat Tebing
- Coached by: Hendra Basir
Medal record
Men's competition climbing
Representing Indonesia
World Championships
Bronze medal – third place	2023 Bern	Speed
Asian Games
Silver medal – second place	2022 Hangzhou	Speed relay
Asian Championships
Gold medal – first place	2019 Bogor	Speed relay
Bronze medal – third place	2019 Bogor	Speed
ASEAN University Games
Gold medal – first place	2022 Ubon Ratchathani	Speed relay
Bronze medal – third place	2022 Ubon Ratchathani	Speed
World Youth Championships
Bronze medal – third place	2019 Arco	Speed juniors

Rahmad Adi Mulyono (born 31 October 2000) is an Indonesian competition climber who specializes in competition speed climbing. He won a bronze medal at the 2023 IFSC Climbing World Championships.

== Career ==
In the qualification seeding round of the 2024 Summer Olympics, Mulyono received the 14th seed due to false start. He finished the competition after compatriot Veddriq Leonardo eliminated him in the next round and placed in the 10th position.

== Achievements ==
=== World Championships ===
Men's speed

Year	Venue	Opponent	Time (s)	Result	Ref
2023	PostFinance Arena, Bern, Switzerland	(Kazakhstan) Rishat Khaibullin	5.05–7.34	(bronze) Bronze	

=== Asian Games ===
Men's speed relay

Year	Venue	Partner	Opponent	Time (s)	Result	Ref
2022	Keqiao Yangshan Sport Climbing Centre, Shaoxing, China	(Indonesia) Kiromal Katibin (Indonesia) Veddriq Leonardo (Indonesia) Aspar	(China) Wang Xinshang (China) Wu Peng (China) Zhang Liang (China) Long Jinbao	FS–W	(silver) Silver	

=== Asian Championships ===
Men's speed

Year	Venue	Opponent	Time (s)	Result	Ref
2019	Pakansari Stadium, Bogor, Indonesia	(Indonesia) Zaenal Aripin	6.122–fall	(bronze) Bronze	

Men's speed relay

Year	Venue	Partner	Opponent	Time (s)	Result	Ref
2019	Pakansari Stadium, Bogor, Indonesia	(Indonesia) Sabri (Indonesia) Fatchur Roji	(Indonesia) Kiromal Katibin (Indonesia) Veddriq Leonardo (Indonesia) Zaenal Aripin	23.492–fall	(gold) Gold	

=== IFSC Climbing World Cup ===
Men's speed

Year	Venue	Opponent	Time (s)	Result	Ref
2022	Seoul, South Korea	(Italy) Ludovico Fossali	5.587–fall	(bronze) Bronze	
2023	Chamonix, France	(Kazakhstan) Rishat Khaibullin	5.01–5.05	(gold) Gold	

=== NEOM Beach Games ===
Men's speed

Year	Venue	Opponent	Time (s)	Result	Ref
2023	Gayal Beach, Neom, Saudi Arabia	(Kazakhstan) Amir Maimuratov	5.436–0	(bronze) Bronze	
