= 2023 IFSC Climbing World Championships =

Annual competition climbing event

- Venue: PostFinance Arena
- Location: Bern, Switzerland
- Date: 1 – 12 August 2023
- Website: https://bern2023.org/

The 2023 IFSC Climbing World Championships, the 18th edition, was held in Bern, Switzerland from 1 to 12 August 2023. The competition climbing championships consisted of lead, speed, bouldering, and boulder & lead combined events, along with the paraclimbing event. The speed and combined events served as the first qualifying event for the 2024 Summer Olympics. PostFinance Arena served as the event venue.

Pierre Broyer developed a problem based around no-tex holds for the bouldering contest which marked the beginning of their wider use.

== Medalists ==
Event	Gold	Silver	Bronze
Men's Lead	Jakob Schubert (AUT)	Sorato Anraku (JPN)	Alexander Megos (GER)
Men's Bouldering	Mickaël Mawem (FRA)	Mejdi Schalck (FRA)	Lee Dohyun (KOR)
Men's Speed	Matteo Zurloni (ITA)	Long Jinbao (CHN)	Rahmad Adi Mulyono (INA)
Men's Combined	Jakob Schubert (AUT)	Colin Duffy (USA)	Tomoa Narasaki (JPN)
Women's Lead	Ai Mori (JPN)	Janja Garnbret (SLO)	Seo Chae-hyun (KOR)
Women's Bouldering	Janja Garnbret (SLO)	Oriane Bertone (FRA)	Brooke Raboutou (USA)
Women's Speed	Desak Made Rita Kusuma Dewi (INA)	Emma Hunt (USA)	Aleksandra Mirosław (POL)
Women's Combined	Janja Garnbret (SLO)	Jessica Pilz (AUT)	Ai Mori (JPN)

== Medal table ==
* Host nation (Switzerland)

Rank	Nation	Gold	Silver	Bronze	Total
1	Austria	2	1	0	3
1	Slovenia	2	1	0	3
3	France	1	2	0	3
4	Japan	1	1	2	4
5	Indonesia	1	0	1	2
6	Italy	1	0	0	1
7	United States	0	2	1	3
8	China	0	1	0	1
9	South Korea	0	0	2	2
10	Germany	0	0	1	1
10	Poland	0	0	1	1
Totals (11 entries)		8	8	8	24

== Lead ==
=== Men ===
Rank	Name	Qualification					Semi-Final	Final
Rank	Name	Route 1		Route 2		Points	Semi-Final	Final
Rank	Name	Score	Rank	Score	Rank	Points	Semi-Final	Final
1	(Austria) Jakob Schubert	42+	1	32+	1	1.00	38+	48+
2	(Japan) Sorato Anraku	39+	1	36+	2	2.00	30+	48
3	(Germany) Alexander Megos	41	4	25+	11	7.35	34	40
4	(South Korea) Lee Dohyun	37	9	25+	11	11.62	29+	39+
5	(Japan) Ao Yurikusa	30	14	35+	3	6.71	32+	38+
6	(France) Paul Jenft	37+	7	25+	11	10.06	29+	33+
7	(United States) Sean Bailey	38	5	23+	21	11.00	29+	30+
8	(Czech Republic) Adam Ondra	39+	1	34+	5	3.16	39+	27+
9	(United Kingdom) Toby Roberts	39+	1	35	4	2.83	43+	20
10	(South Korea) Song Yun-chan	38	5	30+	4	4.97	32+	17

=== Women ===
Rank	Name	Qualification					Semi-Final	Final
Rank	Name	Route 1		Route 2		Points	Semi-Final	Final
Rank	Name	Score	Rank	Score	Rank	Points	Semi-Final	Final
1	(Japan) Ai Mori	44+	3	47+	1	1.73	52	TOP
2	(Slovenia) Janja Garnbret	TOP	1	TOP	1	1.00	47	TOP
3	(South Korea) Seo Chae-hyun	TOP	1	44+	2	2.29	37	47+
4	(Slovenia) Mia Krampl	41	6	28	11	8.31	36+	42
5	(United States) Brooke Raboutou	52+	2	38+	2	2.00	44+	39+
6	(Austria) Jessica Pilz	40+	6	44+	2	4.77	37	39
7	(Italy) Laura Rogora	TOP	1	44+	2	2.29	37+	36+
8	(Japan) Miho Nonaka	40+	7	28+	9	8.15	36+	32
9	(United Kingdom) Molly Thompson-Smith	46+	3	26	20	8.03	37+	26+

== Bouldering ==
=== Men ===
Rank	Name	Qualification	Semi-Final	Final
1	(France) Mickael Mawem	3t4z 16 13	3t4z 7 8	3t4z 8 12
2	(France) Mejdi Schalck	3t4z 7 10	3t3z 8 6	2t4z 5 10
3	(South Korea) Lee Dohyun	3t3z 12 12	3t3z 10 8	2t3z 5 15
4	(Japan) Sorato Anraku	5t5z 11 10	4t4z 11 5	2t2z 3 3
5	(Austria) Nicolai Uznik	3t4z 6 10	2t4z 2 7	1t3z 2 5
6	(Japan) Kokoro Fujii	3t3z 5 8	3t4z 10 6	0t2z 0 3

=== Women ===
Rank	Name	Qualification	Semi-Final	Final
1	(Slovenia) Janja Garnbret	5t5z 9 5	4t4z 4 4	4t4z 4 4
2	(France) Oriane Bertone	3t5z 6 7	3t4z 4 5	3t4z 7 4
3	(United States) Brooke Raboutou	3t5z 7 13	4t4z 9 6	2t4z 2 11
4	(France) Zélia Avezou	4t5z 9 13	3t4z 9 8	2t4z 8 10
5	(United States) Natalia Grossman	3t5z 10 7	3t4z 4 6	1t4z 1 9
6	(Japan) Ai Mori	3t4z 4 6	3t4z 6 8	1t2z 1 6

== Speed ==
=== Men ===
Final bracket

Round of 16
1 (Indonesia) Veddriq Leonardo	6.35
16 (Spain) Erik Noya Cardona	5.46
8 (Japan) Jun Yasukawa	Fall
9 (Kazakhstan) Rishat Khaibullin	5.46
4 (China) Zhang Liang	5.18
13 (France) Pierre Rebreyend	5.49
5 (China) Long Jinbao	5.21
12 (Indonesia) Aspar Aspar	8.20
2 (Indonesia) Rahmad Adi Mulyono	5.04
15 (Ukraine) Yaroslav Tkach	5.25
7 (Indonesia) Kiromal Katibin	5.09
10 (China) Wang Xinshang	5.15
3 (China) Wu Peng	5.33
14 (United States) Zack Hammer	6.69
6 (Italy) Matteo Zurloni	6.36
11 (France) Bassa Mawem	7.28

Quarterfinals
(Spain) Erik Noya Cardona	6.87
(Kazakhstan) Rishat Khaibullin	5.26
(China) Zhang Liang	5.28
(China) Long Jinbao	5.08
(Indonesia) Rahmad Adi Mulyono	4.97
(Indonesia) Kiromal Katibin	5.05
(China) Wu Peng	5.12
(Italy) Matteo Zurloni	5.02

Semifinals
(Kazakhstan) Rishat Khaibullin	5.17
(China) Long Jinbao	5.03
(Indonesia) Rahmad Adi Mulyono	8.01
(Italy) Matteo Zurloni	5.13

Final
(China) Long Jinbao	False start
(Italy) Matteo Zurloni	5.56
Third place
(Kazakhstan) Rishat Khaibullin	7.34
(Indonesia) Rahmad Adi Mulyono	5.05

=== Women ===
Final bracket

Round of 16
1 (Poland) Aleksandra Mirosław	6.41
16 (China) Niu Di	7.21
8 (China) Deng Lijuan	7.50
9 (Spain) Leslie Romero	7.19
4 (United States) Emma Hunt	6.83
13 (China) Wang Shengyan	7.78
5 (Poland) Natalia Kałucka	Fall
12 (China) Zhou Yafei	7.45
2 (Indonesia) Desak Made Rita Kusuma Dewi	6.70
15 (Italy) Giulia Randi	7.43
7 (Poland) Patrycja Chudziak	7.18
10 (France) Capucine Viglione	8.61
3 (Poland) Aleksandra Kałucka	6.70
14 (Indonesia) Nurul Iqamah	10.03
6 (Indonesia) Rajiah Sallsabillah	6.86
11 (South Korea) Jeong Ji-min	7.15

Quarterfinals
(Poland) Aleksandra Mirosław	6.38
(Spain) Leslie Romero	7.18
(United States) Emma Hunt	7.10
(China) Zhou Yafei	7.22
(Indonesia) Desak Made Rita Kusuma Dewi	6.64
(Poland) Patrycja Chudziak	7.14
(Poland) Aleksandra Kałucka	6.58
(Indonesia) Rajiah Sallsabillah	7.72

Semifinals
(Poland) Aleksandra Mirosław	Fall
(United States) Emma Hunt	7.17
(Indonesia) Desak Made Rita Kusuma Dewi	6.48
(Poland) Aleksandra Kałucka	7.40

Final
(United States) Emma Hunt	6.67
(Indonesia) Desak Made Rita Kusuma Dewi	6.49
Third place
(Poland) Aleksandra Mirosław	6.55
(Poland) Aleksandra Kałucka	8.07

== Combined ==
=== Men ===
Rank	Name	Bouldering		Lead		Points
Rank	Name	Score	Points	Holds	Points	Points
1	(Austria) Jakob Schubert	4T4hz4lz 8 8 8	99.6	42	84	183.6
2	(United States) Colin Duffy	3T4hz4lz 5 7 5	84.7	40	76	160.7
3	(Japan) Tomoa Narasaki	4T4hz4lz 7 5 4	99.7	35	57	156.7
4	(Japan) Sorato Anraku	3T4hz4lz 3 4 4	85	37+	64.1	149.1
5	(United Kingdom) Toby Roberts	3T3hz4lz 9 5 5	79.3	37+	64.1	143.4
6	(Czech Republic) Adam Ondra	3T4hz4lz 8 13 6	84.1	35+	57.1	141.2
7	(South Korea) Lee Dohyun	2T4hz4lz 2 4 4	70	35+	57.1	127.1
8	(France) Paul Jenft	2T4hz4lz 3 6 4	68.9	27	33	102.8

=== Women ===
Rank	Name	Bouldering		Lead		Points
Rank	Name	Score	Points	Holds	Points	Points
1	(Slovenia) Janja Garnbret	3T4hz4lz 4 4 4	84.9	49+	92.1	177.0
2	(Austria) Jessica Pilz	2T4hz4lz 6 13 9	69.0	48+	88.1	157.1
3	(Japan) Ai Mori	1T2hz4lz 3 3 7	44.5	50+	96.1	140.6
4	(United States) Brooke Raboutou	2T4hz4lz 3 6 5	69.8	43	68.0	137.8
5	(South Korea) Jain Kim	0T0hz3lz 0 0 12	14.1	49+	92.1	106.2
6	(France) Oriane Bertone	1T4hz4lz 3 6 5	54.7	34+	39.1	93.8
7	(Japan) Miho Nonaka	1T4hz4lz 2 9 6	54.4	34+	39.1	93.5
8	(United States) Anastasia Sanders	0T1hz4lz 0 3 6	24.6	36+	45.1	69.7

== See also ==
- 2023 IFSC Climbing World Cup
