= Wu Peng (climber) =

Chinese speed climber

Personal information
- Native name: 伍鹏
- Born: 15 October 2002 (age 23) Jiugongqiao, Shaoyang County, Shaoyang, Hunan, China
- Years active: 2022—present

Climbing career
- Type of climber: Competition speed climbing

Sport
- Country: China
- Coached by: Zhong Qixin
Medal record
Men's competition climbing
Representing China
Olympics
Silver medal – second place	2024 Paris	Speed
World Cup
Gold medal – first place	2023 Wujiang	Speed
Gold medal – first place	2024 Wujiang	Speed
Silver medal – second place	2022 Villars	Speed
Silver medal – second place	2023 Salt Lake City	Speed
Asian Championships
Gold medal – first place	2024 Tai'an	Speed
Asian Games
Gold medal – first place	2022 Hangzhou	Speed relay

Wu Peng (simplified Chinese: 伍鹏; traditional Chinese: 伍鵬; pinyin: Wǔ Péng; born 15 October 2002) is a Chinese competition speed climber. He represented China at the 2024 Summer Olympics and won a silver medal in the men's speed event.

== Career ==
Wu competed at the 2023 IFSC Climbing World Championships and finished in sixth place. He finished the 2023 IFSC Climbing World Cup season in second place.

During the first leg of 2024 Olympic Qualifier Series in Shanghai, Wu finished in second place. He had the fastest time of qualifying during his first attempt, finishing in 4.94 seconds. During the second leg of the Olympic Qualifier Series in Budapest, Wu finished in first place with an Asian record time of 4.90 seconds, and just 0.04 seconds shy of tying Sam Watson's world record time.

He finished first overall in the Olympic Qualifier Series rankings and qualified to represent China at the 2024 Summer Olympics. During the semifinals of the men's speed event, he defeated world record holder Sam Watson to advance to the final. In the event final, he won a silver medal with a personal best time of 4.77 seconds, finishing 0.02 seconds behind Indonesia's Veddriq Leonardo.

== Major results ==
=== Olympic Games ===
Discipline	2024
Speed	2

=== World championships ===
Discipline	2023
Speed	6

=== World Cup ===
Discipline	2022	2023	2024
Speed	24	2	11

=== Asian championships ===
Discipline	2024
Speed	1
