= Sam Watson (climber) =

American professional speed climber (born 2006)

Samuel Watson
Personal information
- Born: February 27, 2006 (age 20) Southlake, Texas, U.S.
- Education: University of Utah
- Occupation: Professional climber
- Years active: 2021–present
- Height: 180 cm (5 ft 11 in)

Climbing career
- Type of climber: Competition speed climbing

Sport
- Coached by: Albert Ok
Medal record
Men's competition climbing
Representing the United States
Olympic Games
Bronze medal – third place	2024 Paris	Speed
World Games
Silver medal – second place	2025 Chengdu	Speed
Bronze medal – third place	2025 Chengdu	Speed relay
World Cup (Overall)
Winner	2024	Speed
Second place	2025	Speed
World Cup
Gold medal – first place	2026 Krakow	Speed
Gold medal – first place	2025 Chamonix	Speed
Gold medal – first place	2025 Bali	Speed
Gold medal – first place	2024 Salt Lake City	Speed
Gold medal – first place	2024 Chamonix	Speed
Gold medal – first place	2022 Edinburgh	Speed
Silver medal – second place	2024 Wujiang	Speed
World Climbing Series
Gold medal – first place	2026 Krakow	Speed
Bronze medal – third place	2026 Wujiang	Speed
Bronze medal – third place	2025 Denver	Speed
Pan American Games
Gold medal – first place	2023 Santiago	Speed

Samuel Watson (born February 27, 2006) is an American professional rock climber who specializes in competition speed climbing and represents the United States at IFSC Climbing World Cups. He held the world record for the discipline at 4.64 seconds, accomplished at the 2025 IFSC Climbing World Cup in Bali, Indonesia. He won a bronze medal at the 2024 Summer Olympics in Paris, France.

== Career ==
In 2021 Watson won a silver medal at the Youth B category of the IFSC Climbing World Youth Championships in Voronezh, Russia. In 2022 he won a gold medal at the Edinburgh, Scotland IFSC Climbing World Cup, in speed, and became the youngest climber to do so. Also in 2022, Watson won, a bronze medal at the Youth A category of the IFSC Climbing World Youth Championships in Dallas, Texas, and won first in the US National Speed Climbing Championship.

In 2023, Watson set a US and Pan American speed climbing records at 5.02 seconds, at the 2023 IFSC Climbing World Cup in Seoul, Korea. At the Pan American Games that year, he won the gold medal and qualified in speed climbing for the 2024 Summer Olympics.

In the leadup to the Olympics, he set a world record for the discipline at 4.798 seconds, accomplished in the 2024 IFSC Climbing World Cup in Wujiang. At the Olympics, he lost to Wu Peng in the semifinal round, and took the bronze medal in the small final. Along the way, he broke his own world record twice. He set a world record of 4.74 seconds in the small final, climbing against Reza Alipour.

Watson is originally from Texas, and resides in Millcreek, Utah.

== Major results ==
=== Olympic Games ===
Discipline	2024
Speed	3

=== World championships ===
Discipline	2023	2026
Speed	71	1

=== IFSC Climbing World Cup ===
Discipline	2022	2023	2024	2025
Speed	5	3	1	2
