= Erik Noya =

Spanish climber

Personal information
- Born: Erik Noya Cardona; 9 February 1994 (age 32) Caracas, Venezuela

Climbing career
- Type of climber: Competition climbing; Speed climbing
Medal record
Men's competition climbing
Representing Spain
World Championships
Silver medal – second place	2021 Moscow	Speed
European Championships
Bronze medal – third place	2024 Villars	Speed

Erik Noya Cardona (born 9 February 1994) is a Spanish competition climber who specializes in competition speed climbing. He participated at the 2021 IFSC Climbing World Championships, being awarded the silver medal in the men's speed event.

== See also ==
- List of grade milestones in rock climbing
- History of rock climbing
- Rankings of most career IFSC gold medals
