= Paul Jenft =

French rock climber (born 2003)

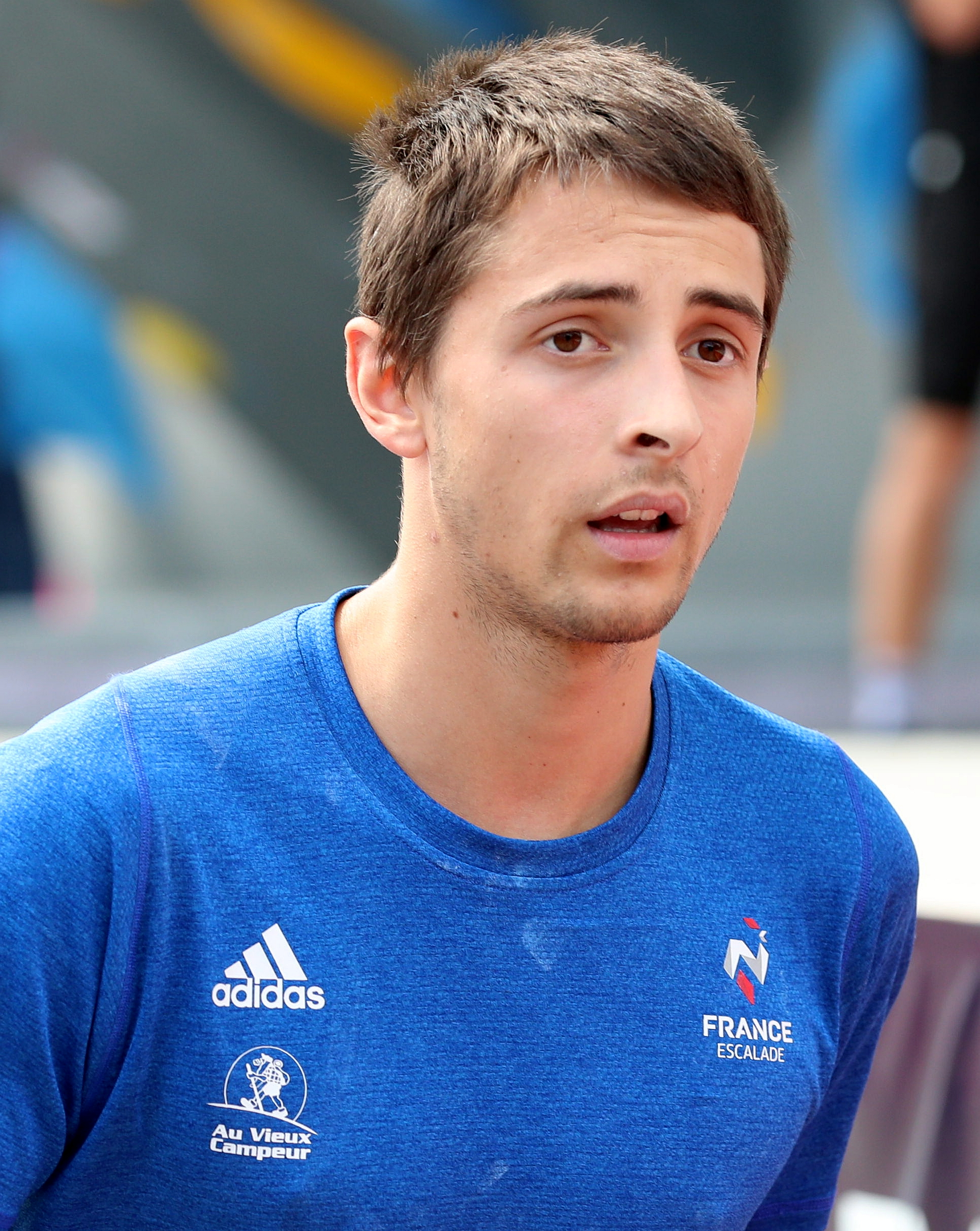
- Jenft in 2022

Personal information
- Nationality: France
- Born: 16 June 2003 (age 23) Grenoble, France

Climbing career
- Type of climber: Competition climbing
Medal record
Men's competition climbing
Representing France
World Cup
Bronze medal – third place	Hachioji 2023	Bouldering

Paul Jenft (born 16 June 2003) is a French rock climber who specializes in competition climbing. He finished third in the bouldering event in Hachioji at the 2023 IFSC Climbing World Cup. He qualified for the boulder and lead combined event at the 2024 Summer Olympics, placing 8th in the final.
