= 2022 IFSC Climbing World Cup =

34th edition climbing world cup

- Organiser: IFSC
- Edition: 34th
- Events: 21: 6 Boulder 7 Lead 7 Speed 1 Boulder & Lead Combined
- Locations: 12: ~~Moscow~~ Meiringen Seoul Salt Lake City (Italy) Brixen Innsbruck Villars Chamonix Briançon Koper Edinburgh Jakarta ~~Wujiang~~ ~~Chongqing~~ Morioka-Iwate
- Dates: 8 April – 22 October 2022

Lead
- Men: (Slovenia) Luka Potočar
- Women: (Slovenia) Janja Garnbret
- Team: Japan

Boulder
- Men: (Japan) Yoshiyuki Ogata
- Women: (United States) Natalia Grossman
- Team: Japan

Speed
- Men: (Indonesia) Veddriq Leonardo
- Women: (Poland) Aleksandra Kałucka
- Team: Indonesia

The 2022 IFSC Climbing World Cup is the 34th edition of the international sport climbing competition series organised by the International Federation of Sport Climbing (IFSC), held in 12 locations. There are 21 events: six bouldering, seven lead, seven speed, and one bouldering & lead combined events. The series began on 8 April in Meiringen, Switzerland with the first bouldering competitions of the season, and concluded on 22 October in Morioka-Iwate, Japan, which introduced the Boulder & Lead combined format that will be used at the 2024 Summer Olympics in Paris.

The top 3 in each competition receive medals, and the overall winners are awarded trophies. At the end of the season, an overall ranking is determined based upon points, which athletes are awarded for finishing in the top 30 of each individual event.

== Scheduling ==
The IFSC announced the 2022 World Cup schedule in October 2021. The series was initially scheduled to open in Moscow instead of the traditional curtain-raiser in Meiringen, Switzerland, and repeats the back-to-back events held in Salt Lake City, introduced in the 2021 series The IFSC followed up in December 2021 with an announcement of Koper, Slovenia as a first-time host city, a change from the traditional host city of Kranj, Slovenia which hosted a World Cup event 25 times between 1996 and 2021, as well as Wujiang as the last stop in the circuit.

On 25 February 2022, the IFSC announced the suspension of the Boulder and Speed World Cup in Moscow scheduled for April, following the Russian invasion of Ukraine. On 22 March 2022, the federation announced that the suspended Moscow Boulder World Cup event was rescheduled to take place in Brixen, Italy from 10 to 12 June 2022.

On 24 March 2022, the IFSC announced that the World Cup originally scheduled to take place in Bali, Indonesia, would now take place in Jakarta.

On 20 May 2022, the IFSC announced the cancellation of two World Cup events in China, Wujiang (Lead & Speed) from 30 September to 2 October and Chongqing (Lead & Boulder) from 6 to 9 October, citing concerns over the COVID-19 pandemic.

Later in May, the federation announced that the Boulder World Cup event originally scheduled for Japan in May would be rescheduled as a Boulder & Lead World Cup in Morioka-Iwate, Japan from 20 to 22 October. This would be the first IFSC event to feature the Boulder & Lead combined format that will be used at the 2024 Summer Olympics in Paris.

In July, the IFSC announced a Lead & Speed World Cup to take place 9 to 11 September in Edinburgh, to replace the previously canceled Wujiang World Cup. Edinburgh had most recently hosted a World Cup in 2017.

== Overview ==
No.	Dates	Location	D	G	Gold		Silver		Bronze	
1	8–10 April	(Switzerland) Meiringen	B	M	(Japan) Tomoa Narasaki	2T3Z 3 6	(Japan) Yoshiyuki Ogata	2T3Z 5 19	(France) Mejdi Schalck	2T3Z 7 9
1	8–10 April	(Switzerland) Meiringen	B	W	(Slovenia) Janja Garnbret	4T4Z 5 5	(United States) Natalia Grossman	3T4Z 8 16	(Switzerland) Andrea Kümin	1T2Z 1 3
2	6–8 May	(South Korea) Seoul	B	M	(Japan) Kokoro Fujii	4T4Z 11 4	(Japan) Tomoa Narasaki	4T4Z 12 8	(Japan) Yoshiyuki Ogata	3T4Z 6 7
2	6–8 May	(South Korea) Seoul	B	W	(United States) Natalia Grossman	4T4Z 7 5	(France) Oriane Bertone	3T4Z 5 5	(United States) Brooke Raboutou	3T3Z 6 5
2	6–8 May	(South Korea) Seoul	S	M	(Indonesia) Veddriq Leonardo	6.965	(Indonesia) Kiromal Katibin	false start	(Indonesia) Rahmad Adi Mulyono	5.587
2	6–8 May	(South Korea) Seoul	S	W	(Poland) Aleksandra Mirosław	6.723	(United States) Emma Hunt	7.236	(Poland) Aleksandra Kałucka	7.249
3	20–22 May	(United States) Salt Lake City	B	M	(France) Mejdi Schalck	4T4Z 9 6	(Japan) Yoshiyuki Ogata	4T4Z 11 10	(Japan) Rei Kawamata	3T4Z 14 12
3	20–22 May	(United States) Salt Lake City	B	W	(United States) Natalia Grossman	4T4Z 9 9	(United States) Brooke Raboutou	3T4Z 5 14	(Japan) Miho Nonaka	3T4Z 9 18
3	20–22 May	(United States) Salt Lake City	S	M	(Indonesia) Kiromal Katibin	5.643	(United States) Noah Bratschi	fall	(Indonesia) Veddriq Leonardo	5.595
3	20–22 May	(United States) Salt Lake City	S	W	(Poland) Aleksandra Mirosław	6.934	(Poland) Aleksandra Kałucka	7.838	(Poland) Natalia Kałucka	7.521
4	27–29 May	(United States) Salt Lake City	B	M	(Japan) Yoshiyuki Ogata	4T4Z 5 5	(Slovenia) Anze Peharc	4T4Z 5 5	(Japan) Kokoro Fujii	4T4Z 9 8
4	27–29 May	(United States) Salt Lake City	B	W	(United States) Natalia Grossman	4T4Z 10 4	(Japan) Miho Nonaka	3T4Z 5 5	(United States) Brooke Raboutou	3T4Z 6 4
4	27–29 May	(United States) Salt Lake City	S	M	(Indonesia) Veddriq Leonardo	6.330	(Austria) Tobias Plangger	fall	(Italy) Ludovico Fossali	5.490
4	27–29 May	(United States) Salt Lake City	S	W	(Poland) Aleksandra Mirosław	6.548	(United States) Emma Hunt	fall	(Poland) Aleksandra Kałucka	7.963
5	10–12 June	(Italy) Brixen (Note: Originally scheduled to be held in Moscow, Russia on 1–3 April.)	B	M	(Germany) Yannick Flohé	2T4Z 5 9	(United Kingdom) Maximillian Milne	2T3Z 6 9	(Japan) Tomoa Narasaki	1T4Z 4 9
5	10–12 June	(Italy) Brixen	B	W	(United States) Natalia Grossman	4T4Z 6 5	(Germany) Hannah Meul	4T4Z 6 6	(China) Luo Zhilu	2T4Z 5 9
6	22–25 June	(Austria) Innsbruck	B	M	(United States) Colin Duffy	3T4Z 12 9	(South Korea) Lee Dohyun	2T4Z 10 12	(Japan) Yoshiyuki Ogata	2T4Z 10 14
6	22–25 June	(Austria) Innsbruck	B	W	(United States) Natalia Grossman	4T4Z 5 5	(Germany) Hannah Meul	4T4Z 7 6	(Japan) Miho Nonaka	2T2Z 3 2
6	22–25 June	(Austria) Innsbruck	L	M	(United States) Colin Duffy	38+	(Japan) Ao Yurikusa	37+	(United States) Jesse Grupper	37+
6	22–25 June	(Austria) Innsbruck	L	W	(Slovenia) Janja Garnbret	39+	(South Korea) Seo Chae-hyun	27+	(United States) Brooke Raboutou	27+
7	30 June–2 July	(Switzerland) Villars	L	M	(Japan) Taisei Homma	36+	(United States) Jesse Grupper	34+	(United States) Colin Duffy	34
7	30 June–2 July	(Switzerland) Villars	L	W	(Slovenia) Janja Garnbret	TOP	(United States) Brooke Raboutou	37+	(United States) Natalia Grossman	35+
7	30 June–2 July	(Switzerland) Villars	S	M	(China) Long Jianguo	5.23	(China) Wu Peng	5.24	(China) Long Jinbao	5.16
7	30 June–2 July	(Switzerland) Villars	S	W	(China) Deng Lijuan	6.87	(China) Niu Di	8.22	(Indonesia) Desak Made Rita Kusuma Dewi	7.06
8	8–10 July	(France) Chamonix	L	M	(Czech Republic) Adam Ondra	39+	(Japan) Taisei Homma	39+	(United States) Sean Bailey	29+
8	8–10 July	(France) Chamonix	L	W	(Slovenia) Janja Garnbret	TOP	(Italy) Laura Rogora	TOP	(South Korea) Seo Chae-hyun	TOP
8	8–10 July	(France) Chamonix	S	M	(China) Long Jinbao	5.11	(Spain) Erik Noya Cardona	5.49	(Indonesia) Aspar Aspar	5.53
8	8–10 July	(France) Chamonix	S	W	(China) Deng Lijuan	6.55	(Poland) Aleksandra Kałucka	6.64	(Indonesia) Desak Made Rita Kusuma Dewi	6.82
9	22–23 July	(France) Briançon	L	M	(United States) Jesse Grupper	37	(Japan) Taisei Homma	35+	(Germany) Alexander Megos	35+
9	22–23 July	(France) Briançon	L	W	(Slovenia) Janja Garnbret	42+	(South Korea) Seo Chae-hyun	41+	(United States) Natalia Grossman	41
10	2–3 September	(Slovenia) Koper	L	M	(Slovenia) Luka Potočar	30+	(Switzerland) Sascha Lehmann	30+	(Germany) Yannick Flohé	29+
10	2–3 September	(Slovenia) Koper	L	W	(Japan) Ai Mori	30+	(Slovenia) Janja Garnbret	27+	(United States) Brooke Raboutou	23+
11	9–11 September	(United Kingdom) Edinburgh (Note: Originally scheduled to be held in Wujiang from 30 September to 2 October.)	L	M	(United States) Jesse Grupper	TOP	(Slovenia) Luka Potočar	31+	(United Kingdom) Toby Roberts	30+
11	9–11 September	(United Kingdom) Edinburgh	L	W	(Japan) Ai Mori	TOP	(Slovenia) Janja Garnbret	TOP	(South Korea) Seo Chae-hyun	42+
11	9–11 September	(United Kingdom) Edinburgh	S	M	(United States) Samuel Watson	5.97	(China) Long Jinbao	6.93	(Spain) Erik Noya Cardona	wc
11	9–11 September	(United Kingdom) Edinburgh	S	W	(Poland) Aleksandra Kałucka	7.47	(Poland) Natalia Kałucka	fall	(United States) Emma Hunt	7.28
12	24–26 September	(Indonesia) Jakarta (Note: Originally scheduled to be held in Bali.)	L	M	(Japan) Ao Yurikusa	29	(Japan) Masahiro Higuchi	28	(Germany) Sebastian Halenke	28
12	24–26 September	(Indonesia) Jakarta	L	W	(Slovenia) Janja Garnbret	TOP	(South Korea) Seo Chae-hyun	40	(Slovenia) Mia Krampl	35+
12	24–26 September	(Indonesia) Jakarta	S	M	(Indonesia) Aspar Aspar	5.39	(Indonesia) Kiromal Katibin	5.75	(China) Cao Long	5.16
12	24–26 September	(Indonesia) Jakarta	S	W	(China) Deng Lijuan	6.66	(Poland) Natalia Kałucka	7.20	(Poland) Aleksandra Kałucka	6.81
13	20–22 October	(Japan) Morioka-Iwate	B&L	M	(Japan) Tomoa Narasaki	156.4	(Japan) Yoshiyuki Ogata	138.4	(Japan) Kokoro Fujii	132.6
13	20–22 October	(Japan) Morioka-Iwate	B&L	W	(Japan) Ai Mori	190.9	(United States) Natalia Grossman	171.2	(South Korea) Seo Chae-hyun	131.8
OVERALL			B	M	(Japan) Yoshiyuki Ogata	3990	(Japan) Tomoa Narasaki	3405	(Japan) Kokoro Fujii	3110
OVERALL			B	W	(United States) Natalia Grossman	5000	(Japan) Miho Nonaka	3210	(United States) Brooke Raboutou	2940
OVERALL			L	M	(Slovenia) Luka Potočar	3860	(Japan) Taisei Homma	3835	(United States) Jesse Grupper	3812
OVERALL			L	W	(Slovenia) Janja Garnbret	5805	(South Korea) Seo Chae-hyun	4405	(United States) Natalia Grossman	3370
OVERALL			S	M	(Indonesia) Veddriq Leonardo	4455	(Indonesia) Kiromal Katibin	4080	(China) Long Jinbao	3105
OVERALL			S	W	(Poland) Aleksandra Kałucka	4680	(United States) Emma Hunt	3950	(Poland) Natalia Kałucka	3820
NATIONAL TEAMS			B	A	Japan	20783	United States	15223	France	10175.5
NATIONAL TEAMS			L	A	Japan	21355	Slovenia	18273.66	United States	16598
NATIONAL TEAMS			S	A	Indonesia	17135	Poland	15347	China	15203

== Competition highlights ==
In the speed competition at the Seoul World Cup on 6 May, Indonesia's Kiromal Katibin and Poland's Aleksandra Mirosław set the world record for their respective genders' at 5.17 seconds and 6.64 seconds, respectively. Two weeks later, Katibin and Mirosław broke their own records in Salt Lake City, at 5.10 seconds and 6.53 seconds, respectively. Katibin broke his own record twice on 30 June during the qualifying round at Villars, posting times of 5.09, and then 5.04 seconds. He broke his record again on 8 July at Chamonix with a time of 5.009.

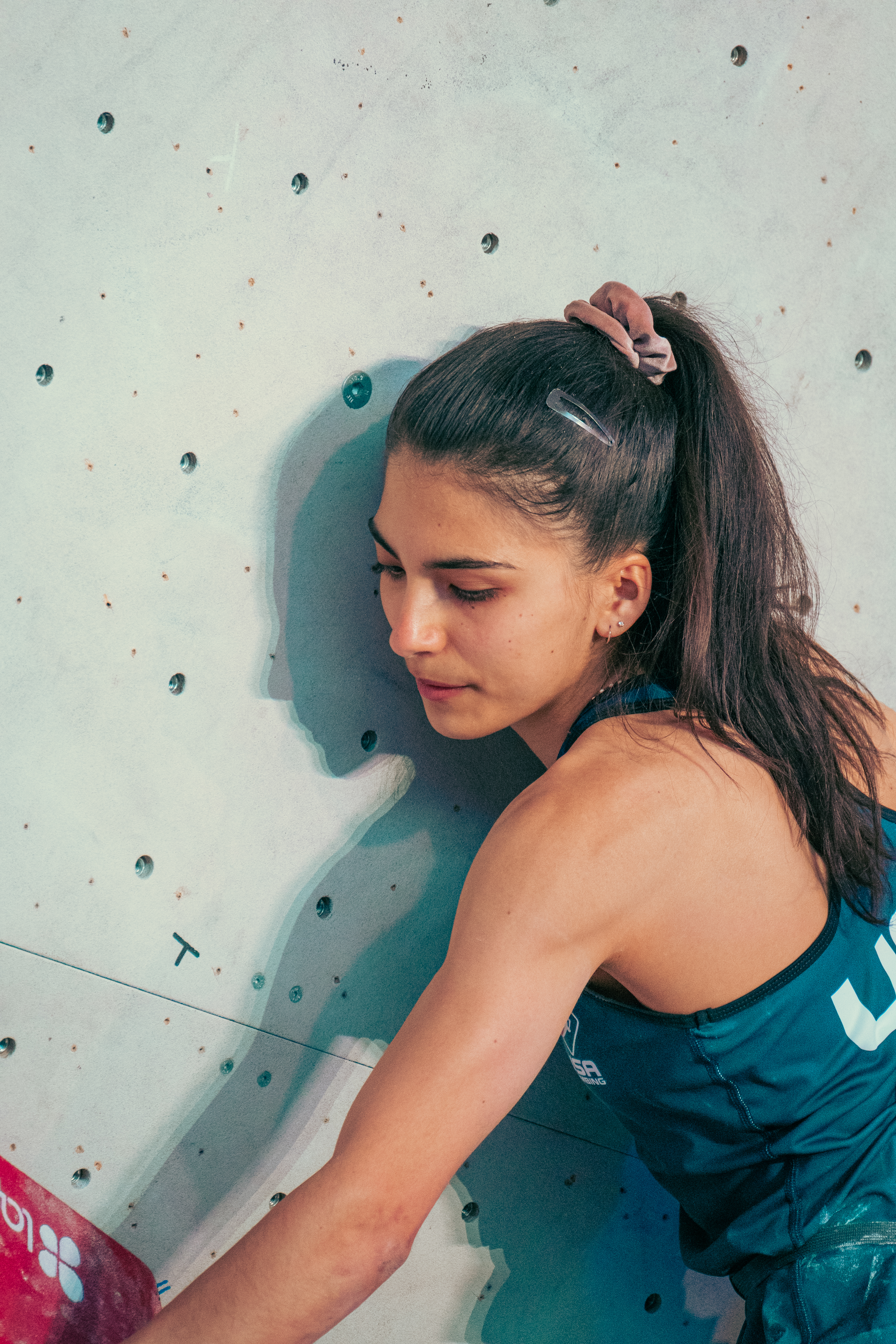
Natalia Grossman at the Brixen World Cup in June 2022

Natalia Grossman of the United States repeated her women's bouldering overall series win with five straight gold medals, only missing the gold when she finished second to Janja Garnbret of Slovenia, who sat out most of the bouldering season. Yoshiyuki Ogata of Japan also repeated as the overall bouldering series winner, and he was joined by fellow Japanese climbers Tomoa Narasaki with the silver and Kokoro Fujii with the bronze, completing a Japanese sweep of the bouldering series podium.

At Innsbruck in June, Colin Duffy of the United States won both the bouldering and lead gold medals, becoming the first male athlete to win both disciplines in the same IFSC World Cup event.

== Bouldering ==
The overall ranking is determined based upon points, which athletes are awarded for finishing in the top 40 of each individual event. The end-of-season standings are based on the sum of points earned from the five best finishes for each athlete. Results displayed (in brackets) are not counted. The national ranking is the sum of the points of that country's three best male and female athletes.

=== Men ===
The results of the ten most successful athletes of the Bouldering World Cup 2022:

Rank	Name	Points	Meiringen	Seoul	Salt Lake City I	Salt Lake City II	Brixen	Innsbruck
1	(Japan) Yoshiyuki Ogata	3990	2. 805	3. 690	2. 805	1. 1000	5. (545)	3. 690
2	(Japan) Tomoa Narasaki	3405	1. 1000	2. 805	7. 455	—	3. 690	7. 455
3	(Japan) Kokoro Fujii	3110	6. 495	1. 1000	14. (260)	3. 690	9. 380	5. 545
4	(Germany) Yannick Flohé	2475	—	—	5. 545	7. 435	1. 1000	6. 495
5	(France) Mejdi Schalck	2294	3. 690	7. 455	1. 1000	21. 137.5	—	43. 11.5
6	(United Kingdom) Maximillian Milne	2215	8. 415	8. 415	13. 280	12. 300	2. 805	14. (260)
7	(South Korea) Lee Dohyun	2128.5	41. 13.5	10. 350	—	10. 350	4. 610	2. 805
8	(United States) Colin Duffy	1976	5. 545	—	21. 137.5	13. 280	41. 13.5	1. 1000
9	(South Korea) Chon Jong-won	1957.5	21. 112.5	12. 300	—	4. 610	11. 325	4. 610
10	(Japan) Rei Kawamata	1774.5	31. 39.5	—	3. 690	5. 545	14. 260	15. 240

=== Women ===
The results of the ten most successful athletes of the Bouldering World Cup 2022:

Rank	Name	Points	Meiringen	Seoul	Salt Lake City I	Salt Lake City II	Brixen	Innsbruck
1	(United States) Natalia Grossman	5000	2. (805)	1. 1000	1. 1000	1. 1000	1. 1000	1. 1000
2	(Japan) Miho Nonaka	3210	26. (68)	8. 415	3. 690	2. 805	4. 610	3. 690
3	(United States) Brooke Raboutou	2940	12. 300	3. 690	2. 805	3. 690	—	7. 455
4	(Japan) Futaba Ito	2560	5. 545	15. (240)	9. 380	4. 610	8. 415	4. 610
5	(Germany) Hannah Meul	2345	7. 455	—	13. 280	—	2. 805	2. 805
6	(France) Oriane Bertone	2316.5	4. 610	2. 805	7. 455	8. 415	—	33. 31.5
7	(Austria) Jessica Pilz	2215	18. (185)	7. 455	4. 610	13. 280	7. 455	8. 415
8	(Serbia) Staša Gejo	2195	6. 495	4. 610	8. 415	11. 325	10. 350	16. (220)
9	(South Korea) Seo Chae-hyun	1930	17. (205)	14. 260	5. 545	12. 300	13. 280	5. 545
10	(Italy) Camilla Moroni	1820	13. 280	5. 545	6. 495	17. (205)	16. 220	13. 280

* = Joint place with another athlete

== Speed ==
The overall ranking is determined based upon points, which athletes are awarded for finishing in the top 40 of each individual event. There were seven competitions in the season. The national ranking is the sum of the points of that country's three best male and female athletes. Results displayed (in brackets) are not counted.

=== Men ===
The results of the ten most successful athletes of the Speed World Cup 2022:

Rank	Name	Points	Seoul	Salt Lake City I	Salt Lake City II	Villars	Chamonix	Edinburgh	Jakarta
1	(Indonesia) Veddriq Leonardo	4455	1. 1000	3. 690	1. 1000	4. 610	4. 610	—	5. 545
2	(Indonesia) Kiromal Katibin	4080	2. 805	1. 1000	5. 545	5. 545	9. 380	—	2. 805
3	(China) Long Jinbao	3105	—	—	—	3. 690	1. 1000	2. 805	4. 610
4	(Spain) Erik Noya Cardona	2955	11. 325	9. 380	7. 455	13. (280)	2. 805	3. 690	12. 300
5	(United States) Samuel Watson	2725	16. 220	8. 415	8. 415	12. 220	58. (5)	1. 1000	7. 455
6	(Italy) Ludovico Fossali	2534	4. 610	4. 610	3. 690	12. 300	15. 240	31. (42)	26. 84
7	(United States) John Brosler	2460	38. (18)	5. 545	6. 495	7. 455	11. 325	7. 455	18. 185
8	(China) Long Jianguo	2380	—	—	—	1. 1000	7. 455	5. 545	9. 380
9	(Indonesia) Aspar Jaelolo	2245	10. 350	—	—	17. 205	3. 690	—	1. 1000
10	(France) Guillaume Moro	2115	7. 455	11. 325	12. 300	8. 415	51. (7)	9. 380	15. 240

=== Women ===
The results of the ten most successful athletes of the Speed World Cup 2022:

Rank	Name	Points	Seoul	Salt Lake City I	Salt Lake City II	Villars	Chamonix	Edinburgh	Jakarta
1	(Poland) Aleksandra Kałucka	4680	3. 690	2. 805	3. 690	9. (380)	2. 805	1. 1000	3. 690
2	(United States) Emma Hunt	3950	2. 805	4. 610	2. 805	6. 495	—	3. 690	5. 545
3	(Poland) Natalia Kałucka	3820	13. (280)	3. 690	4. 610	7. 455	7. 455	2. 805	2. 805
4	(China) Deng Lijuan	3380	—	—	—	1. 1000	1. 1000	9. 380	1. 1000
5	(Poland) Aleksandra Mirosław	3000	1. 1000	1. 1000	1. 1000	—	—	—	—
6	(China) Niu Di	2385	—	—	—	2. 805	6. 495	6. 475*	4. 610
7	(France) Capucine Viglione	2365	6. 495	10. 350	7. 455	8. 415	10. 350	12. 300	15. (240)
8	(Poland) Patrycja Chudziak	2345	11. 325	6. 495	9. 380	12. 300	12. 300	5. 545	18. (185)
9	(France) Aurelia Sarisson	2210	14. 260	5. 545	32. (37)	10. 350	9. 380	11. 325	10. 350
10	(Indonesia) Desak Made Rita Kusuma Dewi	2140	9. 380	—	—	3. 690	3. 690	—	9. 380

* = Joint place with another athlete

== Lead ==
The overall ranking is determined based upon points, which athletes are awarded for finishing in the top 40 of each individual event. There were seven competitions in the season. The national ranking is the sum of the points of that country's three best male and female athletes. Results displayed (in brackets) are not counted.

=== Men ===
The results of the ten most successful athletes of the Lead World Cup 2022:

Rank	NAME	Points	Innsbruck	Villars	Chamonix	Briançon	Koper	Edinburgh	Jakarta
1	(Slovenia) Luka Potočar	3860	4. 610	11. (325)	4. 610	9. 380	1. 1000	2. 805	7. 455
2	(Japan) Taisei Homma	3835	9. 380	1. 1000	2. 805	2. 805	6. 495	10. 350	12. (300)
3	(United States) Jesse Grupper	3812	3. 690	2. 805	35. (27)	1. 1000	32. 37	1. 1000	13. 280
4	(Japan) Ao Yurikusa	3239	2. 805	8. 415	28. (63)	26. 84	4. 610	11. 325	1. 1000
5	(Germany) Yannick Flohé	2910	7. 455	4. 610	5. 545	4. 610	3. 690	-	-
6	(United States) Colin Duffy	2845	1. 1000	3. 690	20. 155	5. 545	-	7. 455	-
7	(Japan) Satone Yoshida	2660	6. 495	5. 545	9. 380	23. (120)	8. 415	13. 280	5. 545
8	(Switzerland) Sascha Lehmann	2635	10. 350	19. (170)	8. 415	10. 350	2. 805	6. 495	16. 220
9	(Japan) Yoshiyuki Ogata	2540	12. 300	6. 495	33. (33)	6. 495	7. 455	8. 415	9. 380
10	(Japan) Masahiro Higuchi	2295	31. (37.33)*	20. 155	17. 205	14. 260	11. 325	5. 545	2. 805

=== Women ===
The results of the ten most successful athletes of the Lead World Cup 2022:

Rank	NAME	Points	Innsbruck	Villars	Chamonix	Briançon	Koper	Edinburgh	Jakarta
1	(Slovenia) Janja Garnbret	5805	1. 1000	1. 1000	1. 1000	1. 1000	2. 805	2. (805)	1. 1000
2	(South Korea) Seo Chae-hyun	4405	2. 805	6. (495)	3. 690	2. 805	4. 610	3. 690	2. 805
3	(United States) Natalia Grossman	3370	6. 495	3. 690	6. 495	3. 690	7. 455	5. 545	-
4	(Italy) Laura Rogora	3345	4. 610	4. 610	2. 805	6. 495	17. (205)	13. 280	5. 545
5	(United States) Brooke Raboutou	3250	3. 690	2. 805	7. 455	4. 610	3. 690	-	-
6	(Japan) Natsuki Tanii	3075	5. 545	8. 415	5. 545	5. 545	13. (280)	4. 610	8. 415
7	(Slovenia) Mia Krampl	2385	22. 125*	9. 380	8. 415	13. 280	6. 495	-	3. 690
8	(Japan) Ryu Nakagawa	2320	12. 300	7. 455	23. (120)	8. 415	15. 240	7. 455	7. 455
9	(Slovenia) Vita Lukan	2235	7. 455	17. (205)	16. 220	7. 455	10. 350	14. 260	6. 495
10	(Austria) Jessica Pilz	2149	8. 415	26. 84	4. 610	-	5. 545	6. 495	-

* = Joint place with another athlete

== Season podium table ==
Rank	Nation	Gold	Silver	Bronze	Total
1	Slovenia (SLO)	2	0	0	2
2	Japan (JPN)	1	3	1	5
3	United States (USA)	1	1	3	5
4	Indonesia (INA)	1	1	0	2
5	Poland (POL)	1	0	1	2
6	South Korea (KOR)	0	1	0	1
7	China (CHN)	0	0	1	1
Totals (7 entries)		6	6	6	18

== Medal table ==
Rank	Nation	Gold	Silver	Bronze	Total
1	United States (USA)	10	8	10	28
2	Japan (JPN)	9	9	8	26
3	Slovenia (SLO)	7	4	1	12
4	China (CHN)	5	3	3	11
5	Poland (POL)	4	4	4	12
6	Indonesia (INA)	4	2	5	11
7	Germany (GER)	1	2	3	6
8	France (FRA)	1	1	1	3
9	Czech Republic (CZE)	1	0	0	1
10	South Korea (KOR)	0	4	3	7
11	Great Britain (GBR)	0	1	1	2
11	Italy (ITA)	0	1	1	2
11	Spain (ESP)	0	1	1	2
11	Switzerland (SWI)	0	1	1	2
15	Austria (AUT)	0	1	0	1
Totals (15 entries)		42	42	42	126
