= Long Jinbao =

Chinese speed climber

Personal information
- Native name: 龙金宝
- Nationality: Chinese
- Born: November 8, 2000 (age 25) Beijing, China
- Years active: 2019–present
- Height: 169 cm (5 ft 7 in)

Sport
- Country: China
- Sport: Sport climbing
- Coached by: Zhong Qixin
Medal record
World Championships
Silver medal – second place	2023 Bern	Speed

Long Jinbao (Chinese: 龙金宝, born 2000 in Beijing) is a Chinese competition speed climber.

== Competition climbing career ==
In April 2019, Long Jinbao competed in the IFSC Climbing World Cup for the first time where he finished tenth in Chongqing. In Villars, he was on the podium for the first time in third place on July 2, 2022. Just a week later, he won his first IFSC World Cup event in Chamonix.

At the IFSC Climbing World Championships in August 2023 in Bern he won the silver medal, and qualified for the 2024 Summer Olympics in Paris.

In the qualification seeding round of the Olympics, Long received the 11th seed for the elimination rounds with the best time 5.29. He finished the competition after Italy's Matteo Zurloni eliminated him in the next round and placed in the 11th position.

== Major results ==
=== Olympic Games ===
Discipline	2024
Speed	11

=== World championships ===
Discipline	2023
Speed	2

=== World Cup ===
Discipline	2019	2021	2022	2023	2024
Speed	17	—	3	7	44

=== Asian championships ===
Discipline	2021
Speed	9
Bouldering	34
Lead	34
Combined	12
