= 2023 IFSC Climbing World Cup =

Series of competitions in the year

- Organiser: IFSC
- Edition: 35th
- Events: 18: 6 Boulder 6 Lead 6 Speed
- Locations: 12: Hachioji Seoul Jakarta Salt Lake City Prague Brixen Innsbruck Villars Chamonix Briançon Koper Wujiang
- Dates: 21 April – 24 September 2023

Lead
- Men: (Japan) Sorato Anraku
- Women: (Austria) Jessica Pilz
- Team: Japan

Boulder
- Men: (Japan) Sorato Anraku
- Women: (United States) Natalia Grossman
- Team: Japan

Speed
- Men: (Indonesia) Veddriq Leonardo
- Women: (Poland) Natalia Kałucka
- Team: Indonesia

The 2023 IFSC Climbing World Cup is the 35th edition of the international competition climbing series organized by the International Federation of Sport Climbing (IFSC), held in 12 locations. There are 18 events: six bouldering, six lead, and six speed events. The series begins on 23 April in Hachioji, Japan with the first bouldering competitions of the season, and concluded on 24 September in Wujiang, China.

The top 3 in each competition receive medals, and the overall winners are awarded trophies. At the end of the season, an overall ranking is determined based upon points, which athletes are awarded for finishing in the top 40 of each individual event.

== Scheduling ==
The IFSC announced the 2023 World Cup schedule in September 2022.

== Overview ==
No.	Location	D	G	Gold		Silver		Bronze	
1	(Japan) Hachioji; 21–23 April	B	M	(France) Mejdi Schalck	2T3z 7 7	(Belgium) Hannes Van Duysen	1T3z 2 11	(France) Paul Jenft	1T3z 3 3
1	(Japan) Hachioji; 21–23 April	B	W	(United States) Brooke Raboutou	3T3z 6 6	(Germany) Hannah Meul	1T3z 1 8	(Japan) Anon Matsufuji	0T3z 0 7
2	(South Korea) Seoul; 28–30 April (Note: Seoul bouldering results based on semifinal standings after finals were canceled due to rain delay.)	B	M	(France) Mejdi Schalck	2T3z 2 7	(Japan) Tomoa Narasaki	2T3z 6 10	(South Korea) Chon Jong-won	2T2z 2 2
2	(South Korea) Seoul; 28–30 April	B	W	(Japan) Miho Nonaka	2T3z 20 22	(France) Oriane Bertone	2T2z 4 3	(United States) Brooke Raboutou	2T2z 10 7
2	(South Korea) Seoul; 28–30 April	S	M	(Indonesia) Veddriq Leonardo	5.01	(China) Long Jinbao	5.12	(China) Wang Xinshang	5.11
2	(South Korea) Seoul; 28–30 April	S	W	(Poland) Aleksandra Mirosław	6.25	(Poland) Natalia Kałucka	6.67	(Indonesia) Desak Made Rita Kusuma Dewi	6.60
3	(Indonesia) Jakarta; 6–7 May	S	M	(Indonesia) Raharjati Nursamsa	5.11	(China) Wang Xinshang	5.14	(Indonesia) Kiromal Katibin	6.34
3	(Indonesia) Jakarta; 6–7 May	S	W	(Poland) Aleksandra Mirosław	6.43	(Indonesia) Desak Made Rita Kusuma Dewi	6.52	(Poland) Aleksandra Kałucka	6.64
4	(United States) Salt Lake City; 19–21 May	B	M	(Japan) Tomoa Narasaki	4T4z 6 5	(Japan) Sorato Anraku	4T4z 12 6	(United Kingdom) Toby Roberts	3T4z 8 10
4	(United States) Salt Lake City; 19–21 May	B	W	(United States) Natalia Grossman	4T4z 5 5	(France) Oriane Bertone	2T4z 3 6	(United States) Brooke Raboutou	2T3z 4 10
4	(United States) Salt Lake City; 19–21 May	S	M	(Indonesia) Veddriq Leonardo	4.95	(China) Wu Peng	6.99	(Indonesia) Kiromal Katibin	4.98
4	(United States) Salt Lake City; 19–21 May	S	W	(Poland) Aleksandra Mirosław	6.43	(Indonesia) Desak Made Rita Kusuma Dewi	6.82	(China) Deng Lijuan	6.77
5	(Czech Republic) Prague; 2–4 June	B	M	(South Korea) Lee Dohyun	4T4z 5 5	(Czech Republic) Adam Ondra	4T4z 13 9	(France) Mejdi Schalck	3T4z 3 6
5	(Czech Republic) Prague; 2–4 June	B	W	(France) Oriane Bertone	3T4z 4 5	(Slovenia) Janja Garnbret	3T4z 6 7	(France) Flavy Cohaut	2T3z 6 12
6	(Italy) Brixen; 9–11 June	B	M	(United Kingdom) Toby Roberts	3T4z 10 7	(South Korea) Lee Dohyun	2T4z 3 4	(Japan) Yoshiyuki Ogata	2T4z 5 6
6	(Italy) Brixen; 9–11 June	B	W	(United States) Natalia Grossman	4T4z 12 12	(South Korea) Seo Chae-hyun	3T4z 3 9	(Serbia) Staša Gejo	3T4z 5 6
7	(Austria) Innsbruck; 14–18 June	B	M	(Japan) Sorato Anraku	3T3z 11 9	(Japan) Meichi Narasaki	3T3z 15 11	(France) Sam Avezou	2T2z 4 3
7	(Austria) Innsbruck; 14–18 June	B	W	(Slovenia) Janja Garnbret	4T4z 4 4	(United States) Natalia Grossman	2T4z 2 11	(Japan) Miho Nonaka	2T4z 2 13
7	(Austria) Innsbruck; 14–18 June	L	M	(Switzerland) Sascha Lehmann	44+	(Germany) Alexander Megos	44+	(Austria) Jakob Schubert	42+
7	(Austria) Innsbruck; 14–18 June	L	W	(Slovenia) Janja Garnbret	39+	(Japan) Ai Mori	33+	(Austria) Jessica Pilz	25+
8	(Switzerland) Villars; 30 June–2 July	L	M	(Austria) Jakob Schubert	42+	(Czech Republic) Adam Ondra	41+	(Germany) Alexander Megos	40
8	(Switzerland) Villars; 30 June–2 July	L	W	(Slovenia) Janja Garnbret	TOP	(Austria) Jessica Pilz	43+	(United States) Brooke Raboutou	43
8	(Switzerland) Villars; 30 June–2 July	S	M	(China) Long Jianguo	5.26	(China) Zhang Liang	FALL	(Japan) Ryo Omasa	5.30
8	(Switzerland) Villars; 30 June–2 July	S	W	(Poland) Natalia Kałucka	6.55	(United States) Emma Hunt	8.37	(China) Deng Lijuan	6.49
9	(France) Chamonix; 7–9 July	L	M	(United Kingdom) Toby Roberts	TOP	(France) Sam Avezou	50	(Japan) Sorato Anraku	48
9	(France) Chamonix; 7–9 July	L	W	(South Korea) Jain Kim	43+	(Japan) Nonoha Kume	38+	(France) Hélène Janicot	38+
9	(France) Chamonix; 7–9 July	S	M	(Indonesia) Rahmad Adi Mulyono	5.01	(Kazakhstan) Rishat Khaibullin	5.05	(Indonesia) Raharjati Nursamsa	5.323
9	(France) Chamonix; 7–9 July	S	W	(Indonesia) Rajiah Sallsabillah	6.97	(France) Victoire Andrier	9.59	(Indonesia) Nurul Iqamah	7.16
10	(France) Briançon; 14–15 July	L	M	(Japan) Sorato Anraku	TOP	(Japan) Taisei Homma	49+	(Japan) Satone Yoshida	49+
10	(France) Briançon; 14–15 July	L	W	(Slovenia) Vita Lukan	46	(Czech Republic) Eliska Adamovska	44+	(France) Manon Hily	44+
11	(Slovenia) Koper; 8–9 September	L	M	(Japan) Sorato Anraku	TOP	(United States) Jesse Grupper	42+	(Spain) Alberto Ginés López	23
11	(Slovenia) Koper; 8–9 September	L	W	(Slovenia) Janja Garnbret	TOP	(Japan) Ai Mori	44+	(Slovenia) Vita Lukan	40+
12	(China) Wujiang; 22–24 September	L	M	(Japan) Sorato Anraku	39+	(Japan) Shion Omata	30+	(Japan) Taisei Homma	26+
12	(China) Wujiang; 22–24 September	L	W	(Japan) Ai Mori	36+	(Austria) Jessica Pilz	31+	(Japan) Natsuki Tanii	26+
12	(China) Wujiang; 22–24 September	S	M	(China) Wu Peng	5.05	(China) Jingjie Huang	5.10	(Japan) Ryo Omasa	5.11
12	(China) Wujiang; 22–24 September	S	W	(China) Deng Lijuan	6.58	(Poland) Natalia Kałucka	6.69	(China) Di Niu	6.89

== Bouldering ==
The overall ranking is determined based upon points, which athletes are awarded for finishing in the top 80 of each individual event. The end-of-season standings are based on the sum of points earned from the five best finishes for each athlete. Results displayed (in brackets) are not counted. The national ranking is the sum of the points of that country's three best male and female athletes.

=== Men ===
The results of the ten most successful athletes of the Bouldering World Cup 2023:

Rank	Name	Points	Hachioji	Seoul	Salt Lake City	Prague	Brixen	Innsbruck
1	(Japan) Sorato Anraku	3350	5. 545	(29. 52*)	2. 805	7. 455	5. 545	1. 1000
2	(South Korea) Lee Dohyun	3130	7. 455	4. 610	(39. 15.3*)	1. 1000	2. 805	14. 260
3	(Japan) Tomoa Narasaki	3000	10. 350	2. 805	1. 1000	10. 350	6. 495	(11. 325)
4	(United Kingdom) Toby Roberts	2710	(25. 89.5*)	8. 415	3. 690	15. 240	1. 1000	9. 365*
5	(France) Mejdi Schalck	2690	1. 1000	1. 1000	(-)	3. 690	-	-
6	(Japan) Yoshiyuki Ogata	2335	13. 280	12. 300	(16. 220)	4. 610	3. 690	7. 455
7	(South Korea) Chon Jong-won	2275	6. 495	3. 690	14. 260	(16. 220)	16. 220	4. 610
8	(Belgium) Hannes Van Duysen	2140	2. 805	13. 280	6. 495	13. 280	(-)	13. 280
9	(Japan) Meichi Narasaki	1945	8. 415	(85. 0)	25. 89.5*	35. 25.5*	4. 610	2. 805
10	(Germany) Yannick Flohé	1750.5	11. 325	7. 455	(-)	5. 545	8. 415	45. 10.5*

=== Women ===
The results of the ten most successful athletes of the Bouldering World Cup 2023:

Rank	Name	Points	Hachioji	Seoul	Salt Lake City	Prague	Brixen	Innsbruck
1	(United States) Natalia Grossman	3527.5	8. 397.5*	11. 325	1. 1000	(-)	1. 1000	2. 805
2	(Japan) Miho Nonaka	3005	11. 325	1. 1000	9. 380	4. 610	(-)	3. 690
3	(United States) Brooke Raboutou	2990	1. 1000	3. 690	3. 690	(-)	-	4. 610
4	(France) Oriane Bertone	2649.5	31. 39.5*	2. 805	2. 805	1. 1000	(-)	-
5	(Israel) Ayala Kerem	1995	4. 610	6. 495	(-)	13. 280	4. 610	-
6	(Serbia) Staša Gejo	1893	27. 68*	10. 350	(-)	5. 545	3. 690	15. 240
7	(Australia) Oceana Mackenzie	1880	(35. 25.5*)	13. 280	12. 300	7. 455	5. 545	12. 300
8	(Slovenia) Janja Garnbret	1805	(-)	-	-	2. 805	-	1. 1000
9	(United States) Anastasia Sanders	1765	37. 20*	5. 545	4. 610	(-)	15. 240	10. 350
10	(South Korea) Seo Chae-hyun	1744.5	14. 250	(29. 52*)	25. 89.5*	8. 415	2. 805	18. 185

* = Joint place with another athlete

== Speed ==
The overall ranking is determined based upon points, which athletes are awarded for finishing in the top 80 of each individual event. The end-of-season standings are based on the sum of points earned from the five best finishes for each athlete. Results displayed (in brackets) are not counted. The national ranking is the sum of the points of that country's three best male and female athletes.

=== Men ===
The results of the ten most successful athletes of the Speed World Cup 2023:

Rank	Name	Points	Seoul	Jakarta	Salt Lake City	Villars	Chamonix	Wujiang
1	(Indonesia) Veddriq Leonardo	3470	1. 1000	5. 545	1. 1000	5. 545	9. 380	—
2	(China) Wu Peng	3405	6. 495	4. 610	2. 805	6. 495	7. 455	1. 1000
3	(United States) Samuel Watson	2550	9. 380	6. 495	4. 610	4. 610	10. 350	7. 455
4	(China) Long Jianguo	2510	4. 610	34. 30	5. 545	1. 1000	11. 325	40. 15
5	(Indonesia) Rahmad Adi Mulyono	2460	10. 350	9. 380	9. 380	10. 350	1. 1000	—
6	(China) Wang Xinshang	2355	3. 690	2. 805	15. 240	15. 240	24. 105	9.380
7	(China) Long Jinbao	2255	2. 805	12. 300	7. 455	13. 280	8. 415	—
8	(China) Zhang Liang	2003	67. 3	10. 350	12. 300	2. 805	71. 1.57	5. 545
9	(South Korea) Shin Eun-cheol	1955	5. 545	8. 415	48. 9	21. 145	15. 240	4. 610
10	(Japan) Ryo Omasa	1814	21. 145	43. 12	17. 205	3. 690	26. 284	3. 690

=== Women ===
The results of the ten most successful athletes of the Speed World Cup 2023:

Rank	Name	Points	Seoul	Jakarta	Salt Lake City	Villars	Chamonix	Wujiang
1	(Poland) Natalia Kałucka	3700	2. 805	6. 495	5. 545	1. 1000	5. 545	2. 805
2	(Poland) Aleksandra Mirosław	3545	1. 1000	1. 1000	1. 1000	—	—	5. 545
3	(China) Deng Lijuan	3535	5. 545	4. 610	3. 690	3. 690	—	1. 1000
4	(Indonesia) Desak Made Rita Kusuma Dewi	3225	3. 690	2. 805	2. 805	5. 545	9. 380	—
5	(Indonesia) Rajiah Sallsabillah	3015	6. 495	8. 415	4. 610	6. 495	1. 1000	—
6	(Poland) Aleksandra Kałucka	2785	4. 610	3. 690	9. 380	9. 380	6. 495	4. 610
7	(United States) Emma Hunt	2665	7. 455	7. 455	6. 495	2. 805	7. 455	—
8	(China) Niu Di	2290	9. 380	5. 545	11. 325	10. 350	13. 280	3. 690
9	(Indonesia) Nurul Iqamah	2125	18. 185	9. 380	7. 455	8. 415	3. 690	—
10	(China) Zhang Shaoqin	1870	10. 350	20. 155	26. 84	12. 300	4. 610	7. 455

* = Joint place with another athlete

== Lead ==
The overall ranking is determined based upon points, which athletes are awarded for finishing in the top 80 of each individual event. The end-of-season standings are based on the sum of points earned from the five best finishes for each athlete. Results displayed (in brackets) are not counted. The national ranking is the sum of the points of that country's three best male and female athletes.

=== Men ===
The results of the ten most successful athletes of the Lead World Cup 2023:

Rank	Name	Points	Innsbruck	Villars	Chamonix	Briançon	Koper	Wujiang
1	(Japan) Sorato Anraku	4300	4. 610	(6. 495)	3. 690	1. 1000	1. 1000	1. 1000
2	(Germany) Alexander Megos	2650	2. 805	3. 690	4. 610	-	5. 545	-
3	(Japan) Taisei Homma	2455	9. 380	13. 280	12. 300	2. 805	(13. 270*)	3. 690
4	(Japan) Shion Omata	2445	12. 300	8. 415	9. 380	5. 545	(15. 240)	2. 805
5	(United Kingdom) Toby Roberts	2440	16. 220	4. 610	1. 1000	-	4. 610	-
6	(Japan) Satone Yoshida	2080	6. 495	12. 300	11. 325	3. 690	13. 270*	(14. 260)
7	(Japan) Yoshiyuki Ogata	2065	(18. 185)	17. 205	14. 260	4. 610	9. 380	4. 610
8	(Switzerland) Sascha Lehmann	1940	1. 1000	18. 185	-	-	12. 300	7. 455
9	(Japan) Masahiro Higuchi	1720	7. 455	21. 145	(26. 84)	6. 495	11. 325	12. 300
10	(Austria) Jakob Schubert	1690	3. 690	1. 1000	-	-	-	-

=== Women ===
The results of the ten most successful athletes of the Lead World Cup 2023:

Rank	Name	Points	Innsbruck	Villars	Chamonix	Briançon	Koper	Wujiang
1	(Austria) Jessica Pilz	3235	3. 690	2. 805	4. 610	-	11. 325	2. 805
2	(Slovenia) Janja Garnbret	3000	1. 1000	1. 1000	-	-	1. 1000	-
3	(Slovenia) Vita Lukan	2725	(17. 205)	13. 280	7. 455	1. 1000	3. 690	12. 300
4	(Japan) Ai Mori	2610	2. 805	-	-	-	2. 805	1. 1000
5	(Japan) Natsuki Tanii	2525	(26. 84)	6. 495	9. 380	8. 415	5. 545	3. 690
6	(South Korea) Jain Kim	2485	11. 325	7. 455	1. 1000	14. 250	(20. 155)	7. 455
7	(South Korea) Seo Chae-hyun	2430	5. 545	4. 610	8. 415	14. 250	4. 610	-
8	(Slovenia) Mia Krampl	2275	6. 495	5. 545	6. 495	-	8. 415	11. 325
9	(Japan) Nonoha Kume	2090	-	16. 220	2. 805	4. 610	7. 455	-
10	(United Kingdom) Molly Thompson-Smith	1885	9. 380	9. 380	12. 300	5. 545	13. 280	-

* = Joint place with another athlete

== Season podium table ==
Rank	Nation	Gold	Silver	Bronze	Total
1	Japan (JPN)	2	1	2	5
2	Poland (POL)	1	1	0	2
3	United States (USA)	1	0	2	3
4	Austria (AUT)	1	0	0	1
4	Indonesia (INA)	1	0	0	1
6	China (CHN)	0	1	1	2
6	Slovenia (SLO)	0	1	1	2
8	Germany (GER)	0	1	0	1
8	South Korea (KOR)	0	1	0	1
Totals (9 entries)		6	6	6	18

== Medal table ==
Rank	Nation	Gold	Silver	Bronze	Total
1	Japan (JPN)	7	8	9	24
2	Indonesia (INA)	5	2	5	12
3	Slovenia (SLO)	5	1	1	7
4	Poland (POL)	4	2	1	7
5	China (CHN)	3	5	4	12
6	France (FRA)	3	4	6	13
7	United States (USA)	3	3	3	9
8	South Korea (KOR)	2	2	1	5
9	Great Britain (GBR)	2	0	1	3
10	Austria (AUT)	1	2	2	5
11	Switzerland (SUI)	1	0	0	1
12	Czech Republic (CZE)	0	3	0	3
13	Germany (GER)	0	2	1	3
14	Belgium (BEL)	0	1	0	1
14	Kazakhstan (KAZ)	0	1	0	1
16	Serbia (SRB)	0	0	1	1
16	Spain (ESP)	0	0	1	1
Totals (17 entries)		36	36	36	108

== See also ==
- 2023 IFSC Climbing World Championships
