= Sport climbing at the 2024 Summer Olympics =

Competition climbing at the Games of the XXXIII Olympiad
- Venue: Le Bourget Sport Climbing Venue
- Dates: 5–10 August 2024
- No. of events: 4 (2 men, 2 women)
- Competitors: 68

Competition climbing at the 2024 Summer Olympics took place from 5 to 10 August at Le Bourget Sport Climbing Venue in Saint-Denis, returning to the program for the second time since the sport's official debut in Tokyo 2020. The total number of medal events was doubled from two in the previous edition because the boulder-and-lead tandem had been separated from the speed format. Furthermore, the number of climbers increased from 40 to 68.

== Venue ==
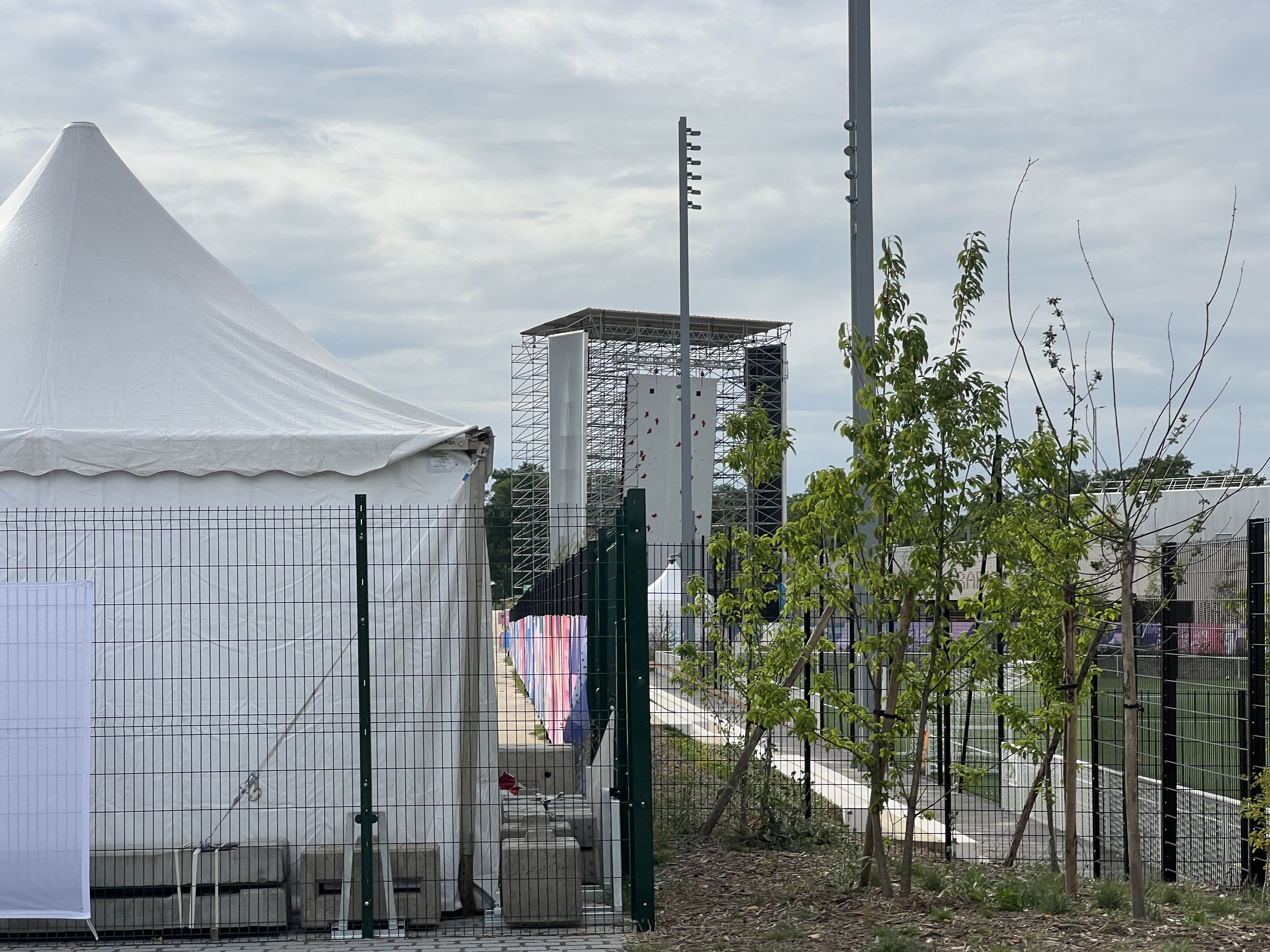
The venue is Le Bourget Sport Climbing Venue (Site d'escalade du Bourget).

The climbing competition is taking place at the Le Bourget Sport Climbing Venue in Le Bourget, in the Seine-Saint-Denis suburb of Paris. Along with the aquatic centre in Saint Denis, the climbing venue serves as one of the two sports facilities to be built specifically for the Games.

== Competition format ==
Since the inclusion of competition climbing in the Olympics for the 2020 Summer Olympics, the International Federation of Sport Climbing (IFSC) has advocated for three separate medal events: bouldering, lead, and speed; however, climbing in Tokyo 2020 was limited to a single 'combined' format for each gender. The format, along with the scoring system multiplying a placement from each discipline, drew criticisms from athletes, prompting a significant overlap between the boulder-and-lead tandem and speed climbing specialists.

For Paris 2024, the International Olympic Committee decided to award four medals in two separate disciplines per gender, namely, boulder-and-lead combined and speed.

=== Speed ===
Speed climbing was a standalone event, and followed the standard single-elimination competition speed climbing format with athletes climbing side-by-side up a 15-metre wall.

=== Boulder-and-lead combined ===
At the 2020 Summer Olympics, points were calculated by multiplying each athlete's position in the lead, boulder, and speed with the athlete who obtained the lowest total winning. With the speed separated from the combined format for Paris 2024, the IFSC has introduced a system that computes the total score from the lead and boulder phases, with the athlete who garners the most points winning.

The proposed scoring format will be distributed as follows:

- An athlete can earn a maximum of 200 points.
- The maximum points for the boulder phase is 100; each of the four problems is worth up to 25.
  - Athletes earn 5 points for reaching the first zone, 10 for the second, and the full 25 for the top.
  - A tenth of a point (0.1) is deducted for each failed attempt to reach the next scoring position.
- The maximum points for the lead phase are 100, attained by reaching and clipping the top of a route.
  - An athlete receives points for the final 40 moves of a route.
  - Counting from the top, the last 10 moves earn 4 points each, the previous 10 moves earn 3 each, the previous 10 moves earn 2 each, and the previous 10 moves earn 1 point each.
  - Moves below the final 40 do not collect any points.

This scoring format was first used (with a slightly different point distribution system) in March 2022 at the Sharma Climbing test event in Barcelona, Spain, before becoming internationally available to the sport climbers at two successful meets: the IFSC Climbing European Championships in Munich, Germany (August 2022) and the IFSC Climbing World Cup series in Morioka, Japan (October 2022).

== Qualification ==
A total of 68 quota places (28 for speed and 40 for boulder-and-lead combined) are available for Paris 2024, an increment of seventy percent from the Tokyo 2020 roster size (40). Each NOC is entitled to enter a maximum of four climbers (two per gender) in the two separate formats.

The qualification period commenced at the 2023 IFSC Climbing World Championships, which took place between 1 and 12 August in Bern, Switzerland. There, ten spots were awarded to the highest-ranked climbers, respecting the two-athlete NOC limit for each gender: the top three medalists for the boulder-and-lead combined, along with the champion and runner-up for the speed climbing. The remainder of the total quota were awarded to the twenty eligible climbers for the boulder-and-lead combined and ten for the speed, respectively, at each of the continental qualification tournaments (Africa, the Americas, Asia, Europe, and Oceania) over a three-month-long period (September to December 2023). Further qualification opportunities will be available at a triad of Olympic Qualifier Series events held between March and June 2024.

Because France is the host country, a single spot is reserved for a French climber of each gender in each discipline if France doesn't otherwise have an athlete who qualifies. Four more quota places (two per gender) are reserved for the NOCs competing in each category under the Universality rule.

== Competition schedule ==
Legend
B	Boulder semifinal	L	Lead semifinal	Q	Qualification	F	Final

Schedule
Event ↓ / Date →	Mon 5 Aug 24	Tue 6 Aug 24	Wed 7 Aug 24	Thu 8 Aug 24	Fri 9 Aug 24	Sat 10 Aug 24
Men's combined	B		L		F	
Men's speed		Q		F		
Women's combined		B		L		F
Women's speed	Q		F			

== Participation ==
In total of 68 climbers from 22 nations:

- Australia (2)
- Austria (2)
- Belgium (1)
- China (7)
- Czech Republic (1)
- France (7) Host
- Germany (3)
- Great Britain (4)
- Indonesia (4)
- Iran (1)
- Italy (4)
- Japan (4)
- Kazakhstan (1)
- New Zealand (2)
- Poland (2)
- Slovenia (3)
- South Africa (4)
- South Korea (3)
- Spain (2)
- Switzerland (1)
- Ukraine (2)
- United States (8)

== Medal summary ==
A total of 12 medals were won by eight NOC's.

=== Medal table ===
* Host nation (France)

Rank	NOC	Gold	Silver	Bronze	Total
1	Poland	1	0	1	2
2	Great Britain	1	0	0	1
2	Indonesia	1	0	0	1
2	Slovenia	1	0	0	1
5	China	0	2	0	2
6	United States	0	1	1	2
7	Japan	0	1	0	1
8	Austria	0	0	2	2
Totals (8 entries)		4	4	4	12

=== Medalists ===
Event	Gold	Silver	Bronze
Men's combined	Toby Roberts; Great Britain	Sorato Anraku; Japan	Jakob Schubert; Austria
Men's speed	Veddriq Leonardo; Indonesia	Wu Peng; China	Sam Watson; United States
Women's combined	Janja Garnbret; Slovenia	Brooke Raboutou; United States	Jessica Pilz; Austria
Women's speed	Aleksandra Mirosław; Poland	Deng Lijuan; China	Aleksandra Kałucka; Poland

== Records broken ==
Event	Round	Climber	Nation	Time	Date	Record
Women's speed (speed)	Qualification	Zhou Yafei	China	6.54	5 August	OR
Women's speed (speed)	Qualification	Desak Made Rita Kusuma Dewi	Indonesia	6.52	5 August	OR
Women's speed (speed)	Qualification	Emma Hunt	United States	6.36	5 August	OR
Women's speed (speed)	Qualification	Aleksandra Mirosław	Poland	6.21	5 August	WR
Women's speed (speed)	Qualification	Aleksandra Mirosław	Poland	6.06	5 August	WR
Men's speed (speed)	Bronze medal match	Sam Watson	United States	4.74	8 August	WR

== See also ==
- Sport climbing at the 2023 Pan American Games
