= List of Asian Games medalists in sport climbing =

This is the complete list of Asian Games medalists in sport climbing from 2018 to 2026.

== Men ==
=== Speed ===
Games	Gold	Silver	Bronze
2018 Jakarta–Palembang	Reza Alipour (IRI)	Zhong Qixin (CHN)	Aspar Jaelolo (INA)
2022 Hangzhou	Reza Alipour (IRI)	Long Jinbao (CHN)	Veddriq Leonardo (INA)
2026 Aichi–Nagoya	Chu Shouhong (CHN)	Reza Alipour (IRI)	Damir Toktarov (KAZ)

=== Speed relay ===
Games	Gold	Silver	Bronze
2018 Jakarta–Palembang	Indonesia (INA); Muhammad Hinayah; Veddriq Leonardo; Rindi Sufriyanto; Abudzar Yulianto	Indonesia (INA); Muhammad Fajri Alfian; Aspar Jaelolo; Sabri; Septo Wibowo Siburian	China (CHN); Li Jinxin; Liang Rongqi; Ou Zhiyong
2022 Hangzhou	China (CHN); Long Jinbao; Wang Xinshang; Wu Peng; Zhang Liang	Indonesia (INA); Aspar Jaelolo; Kiromal Katibin; Veddriq Leonardo; Rahmad Adi Mulyono	South Korea (KOR); Jung Yong-jun; Lee Seung-beom; Lee Yong-su

=== Combined ===
Games	Gold	Silver	Bronze
2018 Jakarta–Palembang	Chon Jong-won (KOR)	Kokoro Fujii (JPN)	Tomoa Narasaki (JPN)
2022 Hangzhou	Sorato Anraku (JPN)	Lee Do-hyun (KOR)	Pan Yufei (CHN)

=== Boulder ===
Games	Gold	Silver	Bronze
2026 Aichi–Nagoya	Sorato Anraku (JPN)	Lee Do-hyun (KOR)	Tomoa Narasaki (JPN)

=== Lead ===
Games	Gold	Silver	Bronze
2026 Aichi–Nagoya	Neo Suzuki (JPN)	Satone Yoshida (JPN)	Lee Do-hyun (KOR)

== Women ==
=== Speed ===
Games	Gold	Silver	Bronze
2018 Jakarta–Palembang	Aries Susanti Rahayu (INA)	Puji Lestari (INA)	He Cuilian (CHN)
2022 Hangzhou	Desak Made Rita Kusuma Dewi (INA)	Deng Lijuan (CHN)	Rajiah Sallsabillah (INA)
2026 Aichi–Nagoya	Desak Made Rita Kusuma Dewi (INA)	Deng Lijuan (CHN)	Jeong Jimin (KOR)

=== Speed relay ===
Games	Gold	Silver	Bronze
2018 Jakarta–Palembang	Indonesia (INA); Fitriyani; Puji Lestari; Aries Susanti Rahayu; Rajiah Sallsabillah	China (CHN); Deng Lijuan; Niu Di; Pan Xuhua	China (CHN); He Cuilian; Ni Mingwei; Qiu Haimei; Song Yiling
2022 Hangzhou	China (CHN); Deng Lijuan; Niu Di; Wang Shengyan; Zhang Shaoqin	Indonesia (INA); Desak Made Rita Kusuma Dewi; Nurul Iqamah; Alivany Ver Khadijah; Rajiah Sallsabillah	South Korea (KOR); Choi Na-woo; Jeong Ji-min; Noh Hee-ju

=== Combined ===
Games	Gold	Silver	Bronze
2018 Jakarta–Palembang	Akiyo Noguchi (JPN)	Sa Sol (KOR)	Kim Ja-in (KOR)
2022 Hangzhou	Ai Mori (JPN)	Seo Chae-hyun (KOR)	Zhang Yuetong (CHN)

=== Boulder ===
Games	Gold	Silver	Bronze
2026 Aichi–Nagoya	Zhang Yuetong (CHN)	Ai Mori (JPN)	Seo Chae-hyun (KOR)

=== Lead ===
Games	Gold	Silver	Bronze
2026 Aichi–Nagoya	Seo Chae-hyun (KOR)	Ai Mori (JPN)	Zhang Yuetong (CHN)
