= Sport climbing at the 2026 Asian Games =

Competition climbing at the 2026 Asian Games
- Venue: Nagoya International Exhibition Hall Exhibition Hall 1
- Dates: 29 September–3 October 2026
- Competitors: 75 from 13 nations

Competition climbing at the 2026 Asian Games will be held between 29 September and 3 October 2026 at the Nagoya International Exhibition Hall.

== Schedule ==
The schedule is as follows:

Q	Qualification	SF	Semifinals	F	Final

Event↓/Date →	29th Tue	30th Wed	1st Thu	2nd Fri	3rd Sat
Men's boulder	SF	F			
Men's lead				SF	F
Men's speed 4		Q	F		
Women's boulder		SF	F		
Women's lead				SF	F
Women's speed 4	Q	F			

== Medal summary ==
=== Medal table ===
* Host nation (Japan)

Rank	Nation	Gold	Silver	Bronze	Total
1	Japan*	2	3	1	6
2	China	2	1	1	4
3	South Korea	1	1	3	5
4	Indonesia	1	0	0	1
5	Iran	0	1	0	1
6	Kazakhstan	0	0	1	1
Totals (6 entries)		6	6	6	18

=== Medalists ===
==== Men's events ====
Event	Gold	Silver	Bronze
Boulder	Sorato Anraku; Japan	Lee Do-hyun; South Korea	Tomoa Narasaki; Japan
Lead	Neo Suzuki; Japan	Satone Yoshida; Japan	Lee Do-hyun; South Korea
Speed	Chu Shouhong; China	Reza Alipour; Iran	Damir Toktarov; Kazakhstan

==== Women's events ====
Event	Gold	Silver	Bronze
Boulder	Zhang Yuetong; China	Ai Mori; Japan	Seo Chae-hyun; South Korea
Lead	Seo Chae-hyun; South Korea	Ai Mori; Japan	Zhang Yuetong; China
Speed	Desak Made Rita Kusuma Dewi; Indonesia	Deng Lijuan; China	Jeong Ji-min; South Korea

== Participating nations ==
- China (8)
- Hong Kong (8)
- India (2)
- Indonesia (9)
- Iran (2)
- Japan (11)
- Jordan (2)
- Kazakhstan (4)
- Kuwait (1)
- Malaysia (2)
- Singapore (9)
- South Korea (10)
- Thailand (7)
