= Sport climbing at the Asian Games =

- Governing bodies: WC (World) / WC Asia (Asia)
- Events: 6 (men: 3; women: 3)

Games
- 1951; 1954; 1958; 1962; 1966; 1970; 1974; 1978; 1982; 1986; 1990; 1994; 1998; 2002; 2006; 2010; 2014; 2018; 2022; 2026
- Medalists

Competition climbing has been included in the Asian Games since the 2018 Asian Games in Palembang, Indonesia, and includes men's and women's events of competition lead climbing, competition bouldering, and competition speed climbing.

== Editions ==
Games	Year	Host city	Best nation
XVIII	2018	Jakarta–Palembang, Indonesia	Indonesia
XIX	2022	Hangzhou, China	China
XX	2026	Aichi–Nagoya, Japan	Japan

== Events ==
Event	18	22	26	Years
Men's boulder			X	1
Men's lead			X	1
Men's speed	X	X	X	3
Men's speed relay	X	X		2
Men's combined	X	X		2
Women's boulder			X	1
Women's lead			X	1
Women's speed	X	X	X	3
Women's speed relay	X	X		2
Women's combined	X	X		2
Total	6	6	6	18

== Medal table ==
As of 2026 edition

Rank	Nation	Gold	Silver	Bronze	Total
1	Indonesia (INA)	5	4	3	12
2	Japan (JPN)	5	4	2	11
3	China (CHN)	4	5	6	15
4	South Korea (KOR)	2	4	6	12
5	Iran (IRI)	2	1	0	3
6	Kazakhstan (KAZ)	0	0	1	1
Totals (6 entries)		18	18	18	54

== Participating nations ==
Nation	18	22	Years
China	18	12	2
Chinese Taipei	1	2	2
Hong Kong	4	6	2
India	3	7	2
Indonesia	20	12	2
Iran	8	5	2
Japan	4	6	2
Kazakhstan	13	12	2
Kuwait		1	1
Malaysia	7		1
Mongolia	3	5	2
Nepal	2		1
Pakistan	2	5	2
Philippines	1	4	2
Singapore	7	5	2
South Korea	14	10	2
Thailand	14	12	2
Uzbekistan		4	1
Number of nations	16	16	
Number of athletes	121	108	

== List of records ==
Event	Time	Athlete	Nation	Games	Date
Men's speed	4.955	Veddriq Leonardo	Indonesia	2022 Hangzhou	3 October 2023
Women's speed	6.062	Desak Made Rita Kusuma Dewi	Indonesia	2026 Aichi–Nagoya	30 September 2026

== See also ==
- IFSC Climbing World Championships
- IFSC Climbing World Cup
