= 2024 in sport climbing =

This article lists the main competition climbing events and their results for 2024. This includes the World Cup, World Championships, International Climbing Series, and Continental Championships.

== Summer Olympics ==
- August 5–10: 2024 Summer Olympics in (France) Paris

== World Championships ==
- August 22–31: 2024 IFSC Climbing World Youth Championships in (China) Guiyang
- September 9–12: 2024 FISU University Climbing Championships in (Slovenia) Koper

== World Cup ==
- April 8–10: CWC #1 in (China) Keqiao
  - Boulder winners: (Japan) Tomoa Narasaki (m) / (Slovenia) Janja Garnbret (w)
- April 12–14: CWC #2 in (China) Wujiang
  - Speed winners: (China) Wu Peng (m) / (Poland) Aleksandra Miroslaw (w)
  - Lead winners: (United Kingdom) Toby Roberts (m) / (Slovenia) Janja Garnbret (w)
- May 3–5: CWC #3 in (United States) Salt Lake City
  - Boulder winners: (Japan) Anraku Sorato (m) / (United States) Natalia Grossman (w)
  - Speed winners: (United States) Sam Watson (m) / (United States) Emma Hunt (w)
- June 26–30: CWC #4 in (Austria) Innsbruck
  - Boulder winners: (Japan) Sohta Amagasa (m) / (Slovenia) Janja Garnbret (w)
  - Lead winners: (Austria) Jakob Schubert (m) / (Slovenia) Janja Garnbret (w)
- July 12–14: CWC #5 in (France) Chamonix
  - Lead winners: (United States) Colin Duffy (m) / (Japan) Ai Mori (w)
  - Speed winners: (United States) Sam Watson (m) / (China) Shaoqin Zhang (w)
- July 17–19: CWC #6 in (France) Briançon
  - Lead winners: (Japan) Zento Murashita (m) / (Japan) Mei Kotake (w)
  - Speed winners: (Italy) Ludovico Fossali (m) / (China) Lijuan Deng (w)
- September 6 & 7: CWC #7 in (Slovenia) Koper
  - Lead winners: (United Kingdom) Toby Roberts (m) / (Slovenia) Janja Garnbret (w)
- September 20–22: CWC #8 in (Czech Republic) Prague
  - Boulder winners: (South Korea) Lee Dohyun (m) / (United States) Natalia Grossman (w)
- October 2–6: CWC #9 (final) in (South Korea) Seoul
  - Boulder winners: (South Korea) Lee Dohyun (m) / (United States) Anastasia Sanders (w)
  - Lead winners: (Japan) Sorato Anraku (m) / (Austria) Jessica Pilz (w)
  - Speed winners: (China) Xinshang Wang (m) / (China) Yafei Zhou (w)

== Continental Championships ==
- August 24 – September 1: 2024 IFSC Climbing European Championships in (Switzerland) Villars
- September 25–29: 2024 IFSC Climbing Youth European Championships in (France) Troyes
- October 10–14: 2024 IFSC Climbing Asian Championships in (China) Tai'an
- November 14–17: 2024 IFSC Climbing Youth Asian Championships in (India) Jamshedpur
- November 20–24: 2024 IFSC Climbing Pan American Championships in (Chile) Santiago

== European Cup ==
=== IFSC-Europe Climbing European Cup 2024 ===
- March 16: EC #1 in (Poland) Lublin
  - Speed winners: (Italy) Gian Luca Zodda (m) / (Germany) Franziska Ritter (w)
- April 26–27: EC #2 in (Austria) Klagenfurt
  - Speed winners: (France) Leo Favot (m) / (Slovenia) Jennifer Eucharia Buckley (w)
- May 25: EC #3 in (Italy) Mezzolombardo
- June 21–22: EC #4 in (Germany) Augsburg
- June 24: EC #5 in (Austria) Innsbruck
- September 13–15: EC #6 in (Italy) Bologna
- October 5–6: EC #7 in (Italy) Genova

=== IFSC-Europe Climbing European Youth Cup 2024 ===
- March 17: YEC #1 in (Poland) Lublin
  - Speed Juniors winners: (Italy) Marco Rontini (m) / (Poland) Daria Marciniak (w)
  - Speed Youth A winners: (Germany) Aodhan Umlauf (m) / (Ukraine) Polina Khalkevych (w)
  - Speed Youth B winners: (Italy) Davide Radaelli (m) / (Italy) Alice Marcelli (w)
- April 5–7: YEC #2 in (Italy) Curno
  - Boulder Juniors winners: (Israel) Yonatan Katz (m) / (France) Lily Abriat (w)
  - Boulder Youth A winners: (Germany) Lucas Trandafir (m) / (United Kingdom) Lucy Garlick (w)
  - Boulder Youth B winners: (Israel) Or Mark (m) / (Ukraine) Rafael Kazbekova (w)
- April 20–21: YEC #3 in (Portugal) Soure
- May 3–5: YEC #4 in (Austria) Graz
- May 24–25: YEC #5 in (Italy) Mezzolombardo
- July 13–14: YEC #6 in (Austria) Dornbirn
- July 19–21: YEC #7 in (Slovakia) Žilina
- September 21–22: YEC #8 in (Switzerland) Ostermundigen

== South America Cup ==
- October 15–20: SAC #1 in (Ecuador) Ibarra
- November 29 – December 1: SAC #2 in (Argentina) Mar del Plata
- December 14–20: SAC #3 in (Brazil) Curitiba

== Olympic Qualifier Series ==
- May 16–19: OQS #1 in (China) Shanghai
- June 20–23: OQS #2 in (Hungary) Budapest

== Other international competitions ==
- March 9–10: Studio Bloc Masters 2024 in (Germany) Pfungstadt
  - Boulder winners: (France) Arthur le Bris (m) / (United States) Natalia Grossman (w)
- March 23–24: Delfts Bleau International Youth Open 2024 in (Netherlands) Delft
  - Boulder U16 winners: (Netherlands) Simon Tse (m) / (Netherlands) Lynn Robichon (w)
  - Boulder U18 winners: (Netherlands) Twan Heuff (m) / (Denmark) Clara Stricker-Petersen (w)
  - Boulder U20 winners: (Belgium) Jitse Remes (m) / (Ukraine) Kseniia Zakharova (w)
- October 18–20: IFSC Madrid 4 Speed in (Spain) Madrid
- November 11–13: NEOM IFSC Masters 2024 in (Saudi Arabia) Neom

== National competitions ==
- February 10–12: 2024 Boulder Japan Cup
  - Winners: (Japan) Yoshiyuki Ogata (m) / (Japan) Mao Nakamura (w)
- February 23–24: 2024 Lead Japan Cup
  - Winners: (Japan) Shion Omata (m) / (Japan) Ai Mori (w)
- February 25: 2024 Speed Japan Cup
  - Winners: (Japan) Jun Yasukawa (m) / (Japan) Ai Takeuchi (w)
