= Lead climbing at the 2019 IFSC Climbing World Cup =

- Location: Villars, Switzerland; Chamonix, France; Briançon, France; Kranj, Slovenia; Xiamen, China; Inzai, Japan
- Dates: 4 July – 27 October 2019

Champions
- Men: (Czech Republic) Adam Ondra
- Women: (South Korea) Chaehyun Seo

Competition lead climbing at the 2019 IFSC Climbing World Cup was held over six stages at six different locations, from 4 July to 27 October 2019. The top three in each competition received medals, and at the end of the season, the overall winners were awarded trophies. The overall winners were determined based upon points, which athletes were awarded for finishing in the top 30 of each individual event. Adam Ondra won the men's seasonal title, Chaehyun Seo won the women's seasonal title, and Japan won the national team title.

== Winners overview ==
Date	Location	Men	Women
July, 4–6	Villars, Switzerland	(Switzerland) Sascha Lehmann	(Slovenia) Janja Garnbret
July, 11–13	Chamonix, France	(Czech Republic) Adam Ondra	(South Korea) Chaehyun Seo
July, 19–20	Briançon, France	(Japan) Hidemasa Nishida	(South Korea) Chaehyun Seo
September, 28–29	Kranj, Slovenia	(Czech Republic) Adam Ondra	(South Korea) Chaehyun Seo
October, 18–20	Xiamen, China	(Czech Republic) Adam Ondra	(South Korea) Chaehyun Seo
October, 26–27	Inzai, Japan	(Japan) Hiroto Shimizu	(South Korea) Jain Kim
OVERALL WINNERS		(Czech Republic) Adam Ondra	(South Korea) Chaehyun Seo
NATIONAL TEAM		Japan	

== Overall ranking ==
The overall ranking is determined based upon points, which athletes are awarded for finishing in the top 30 of each individual event. There are six competitions in the season, but only the best five attempts are counted. The national ranking is the sum of the points of that country's three best male and female athletes. Results displayed in parentheses are not counted.

=== Men ===
The results of the ten most successful athletes of the Lead World Cup 2019:

Rank	NAME	Points	Inzai	Xiamen	Kranj	Briançon	Chamonix	Villars
1	(Czech Republic) Adam Ondra	300.00	( — )	1. 100.00	1. 100.00	( — )	1. 100.00	( — )
2	(Spain) Alberto Ginés López	256.00	2. 80.00	5. 51.00	3. 65.00	22. 9.00	5. 51.00	26. (5.00)
3	(Canada) Sean McColl	206.00	6. 47.00	26. (5.00)	4. 55.00	5. 51.00	7. 43.00	21. 10.00
4	(Japan) Kai Harada	195.00	25. 6.00	4. 55.00	2. 80.00	( — )	8. 40.00	19. 14.00
5	(Italy) Stefano Ghisolfi	190.00	3. 65.00	13. 25.00	6. 47.00	15. 22.00	26. (5.00)	11. 31.00
6	(Japan) Hiroto Shimizu	180.00	1. 100.00	( — )	( — )	2. 80.00	( — )	( — )
7	(Japan) Kokoro Fujii	165.00	20. 12.00	11. 31.00	5. 51.00	( — )	11. 31.00	8. 40.00
7	(Germany) Alexander Megos	165.00	( — )	( — )	( — )	16. 20.00	2. 80.00	3. 65.00
9	(United States) Sean Bailey	158.00	8. 40.00	8. 40.00	14. 24.00	6. 47.00	24. 7.00	( — )
10	(Switzerland) Sascha Lehmann	152.00	( — )	( — )	( — )	13. 26.00	13. 26.00	1. 100.00

=== Women ===
The results of the ten most successful athletes of the Lead World Cup 2019:

Rank	NAME	Points	Inzai	Xiamen	Kranj	Briançon	Chamonix	Villars
1	(South Korea) Chaehyun Seo	480.00	3. (65.00)	1. 100.00	1. 100.00	1. 100.00	1. 100.00	2. 80.00
2	(Slovenia) Janja Garnbret	352.00	2. 80.00	4. 55.00	13. (26.00)	2. 80.00	9. 37.00	1. 100.00
3	(Japan) Natsuki Tanii	243.00	6. 47.00	5. 51.00	( — )	3. 65.00	8. 40.00	8. 40.00
4	(Slovenia) Lucka Rakovec	226.00	16. (20.00)	6. 47.00	3. 65.00	14. 24.00	7. 43.00	6. 47.00
5	(Japan) Akiyo Noguchi	224.00	4. 55.00	2. 80.00	( — )	( — )	10. 34.00	4. 55.00
6	(Japan) Ai Mori	220.00	20. 12.00	9. 37.00	5. 51.00	( — )	4. 55.00	3. 65.00
7	(China) YueTong Zhang	207.00	( — )	7. 43.00	( — )	6. 47.00	2. 80.00	9. 37.00
8	(South Korea) Jain Kim	206.00	1. 100.00	3. 65.00	9. 37.00	( — )	( — )	27. 4.00
9	(Slovenia) Mia Krampl	189.00	22. 9.00	24. (7.00)	7. 43.00	4. 55.00	11. 31.00	5. 51.00
10	(Austria) Jessica Pilz	176.00	( — )	( — )	2. 80.00	( — )	3. 65.00	11. 31.00

=== National Teams ===
The results of the ten most successful countries of the Lead World Cup 2019:

Country names as used by the IFSC

Rank	Nation	Points	Inzai	Xiamen	Kranj	Briançon	Chamonix	Villars
1	(Japan)	1695	345	368	306	375	(220)	301
2	Slovenia	988	(109)	112	210	224	139	303
3	(South Korea) Republic of Korea	758	174	206	137	116	(106)	125
4	United States	612	151	103	75	179	104	(22)
5	Austria	525	(47)	53	143	91	166	72
6	Czech Republic	484	18	136	146	(0)	147	37
7	France	440	66	(44)	65	112	111	86
8	Italy	434	115	90	91	87	(29)	51
9	Germany	381	(24)	79	30	51	138	83
10	(United Kingdom) Great Britain	360	68	62	(31)	75	110	45

== Villars, Switzerland (July, 4–6) ==
97 men and 86 women attended the event.

In men's, Switzerland's Sascha Lehmann topped the final route and claimed victory in front of his home crowd. China's YuFei Pan and Germany's Alexander Megos, also topped the final route, placed second and third respectively due to count-backs to the semi-final. Japan's Tomoa Narasaki, who was leading in the semi-final round, stepped on the rope and slipped, taking sixth place.

In women's, Slovenia's Janja Garnbret was the winner of the event. In the semi-final round, Garnbret claimed the only top of the route despite dropping her chalk bag. South Korea's 15-year-old Chaehyun Seo took second place in her first adult World Cup competition. Japan's Ai Mori, also 15 years old, took third place. South Korea's Jain Kim was forced to withdraw from the competition after suffering a finger injury in the qualification round.

Men						Women					
Rank	Name	Qualification		Semi-Final	Final	Rank	Name	Qualification		Semi-Final	Final
Rank	Name	R1	R2	Semi-Final	Final	Rank	Name	R1	R2	Semi-Final	Final
1st place, gold medalist(s)	(Switzerland) Sascha Lehmann	23+	TOP	36+	TOP	1st place, gold medalist(s)	(Slovenia) Janja Garnbret	TOP	TOP	TOP	36+
2nd place, silver medalist(s)	(China) YuFei Pan	17+	TOP	32	TOP	2nd place, silver medalist(s)	(South Korea) Chaehyun Seo	33+	32	48+	35+
3rd place, bronze medalist(s)	(Germany) Alexander Megos	TOP	TOP	31+	TOP	3rd place, bronze medalist(s)	(Japan) Ai Mori	40+	32+	47	35+
4	(Slovenia) Domen Škofic	TOP	37	36+	39+	4	(Japan) Akiyo Noguchi	35+	31+	42+	35+
5	(Japan) Meichi Narasaki	32+	31+	31+	39+	5	(Slovenia) Mia Krampl	35+	33	38	35+
6	(Japan) Tomoa Narasaki	37+	30	37+	34+	6	(Slovenia) Lucka Rakovec	31	30+	30+	35+
7	(Japan) Yuki Hada	35+	30	36+	22	7	(France) Julia Chanourdie	28+	33+	30	35+
8	(Japan) Kokoro Fujii	35+	29+	33+	8	8	(Japan) Natsuki Tanii	33+	32+	39+	35

== Chamonix, France (July, 11–13) ==
111 men and 103 women attended the event.

In men's, Czech Republic's Adam Ondra topped both qualification routes, ascended higher than anyone else on the semi-final and final routes, and thus securing the win. Germany's Alexander Megos took second place while Austria's Jakob Schubert took third. Ondra would skip the Briançon's event to prepare for the World Championships.

In women's, the final's bottleneck led to count-backs to semi-final results. Eventually, South Korea's Chaehyun Seo took the win. China's YueTong Zhang placed second and Austria's Jessica Pilz third. The winner of last week's event, Slovenia's Janja Garnbret slipped on the semi-final route, placing 9th, barely missing the final. This was the first time Garnbret ever missed a Lead World Cup final.

Men						Women					
Rank	Name	Qualification		Semi-Final	Final	Rank	Name	Qualification		Semi-Final	Final
Rank	Name	R1	R2	Semi-Final	Final	Rank	Name	R1	R2	Semi-Final	Final
1st place, gold medalist(s)	(Czech Republic) Adam Ondra	TOP	TOP	44+	47+	1st place, gold medalist(s)	(South Korea) Chaehyun Seo	TOP	TOP	50	34+
2nd place, silver medalist(s)	(Germany) Alexander Megos	40+	TOP	35	44	2nd place, silver medalist(s)	(China) YueTong Zhang	36+	39+	50	34+
3rd place, bronze medalist(s)	(Austria) Jakob Schubert	32+	TOP	36+	43+	3rd place, bronze medalist(s)	(Austria) Jessica Pilz	41+	26+	50	34+
4	(United Kingdom) William Bosi	21.5+	40	38+	39+	4	(Japan) Ai Mori	35+	41+	45	34+
5	(Spain) Alberto Ginés López	20+	TOP	42+	33+	5	(United States) Ashima Shiraishi	41+	36+	42+	34+
6	(Czech Republic) Martin Stráník	30+	41+	35+	31+	6	(United Kingdom) Molly Thompson-Smith	24	36+	42+	26+
7	(Canada) Sean McColl	21.5+	36+	36	25+	7	(Slovenia) Lucka Rakovec	42	26+	49+	25+
8	(Japan) Kai Harada	32+	TOP	38+	22	8	(Japan) Natsuki Tanii	37+	26+	52+	17+

== Briançon, France (July, 19–20) ==
88 men and 79 women attended the event.

In men's, the Japanese team swept the podium. Hidemasa Nishida claimed the win, Hiroto Shimizu placed second, and Shuta Tanaka placed third. None of them had been on a World Cup podium before.

In women's, last week's winner, South Korea's Chaehyun Seo took the win again. Seo and Slovenian superstar Janja Garnbret topped the final route, but Seo pushed Garnbret to second place by count-back to the semi-final results. Japan's Natsuki Tanii placed third.

Men						Women					
Rank	Name	Qualification		Semi-Final	Final	Rank	Name	Qualification		Semi-Final	Final
Rank	Name	R1	R2	Semi-Final	Final	Rank	Name	R1	R2	Semi-Final	Final
1st place, gold medalist(s)	(Japan) Hidemasa Nishida	39+	42+	31+	39+	1st place, gold medalist(s)	(South Korea) Chaehyun Seo	39+	TOP	TOP	TOP
2nd place, silver medalist(s)	(Japan) Hiroto Shimizu	40+	42+	38+	38+	2nd place, silver medalist(s)	(Slovenia) Janja Garnbret	38+	TOP	43+	TOP
3rd place, bronze medalist(s)	(Japan) Shuta Tanaka	41	40+	34	38+	3rd place, bronze medalist(s)	(Japan) Natsuki Tanii	39+	TOP	43+	41+
4	(United Kingdom) William Bosi	39+	40	37+	38	4	(Slovenia) Mia Krampl	37	35+	43	36
5	(Canada) Sean McColl	40	43+	36+	38	5	(United States) Ashima Shiraishi	30+	35+	41+	36
6	(United States) Sean Bailey	40+	42+	38+	34+	6	(China) YueTong Zhang	31+	35+	42+	33+
7	(Slovenia) Domen Škofic	40+	43+	32+	34+	7	(Slovenia) Vita Lukan	30	35+	37.5	32+
8	(Italy) Marcello Bombardi	40+	38+	32+	34+	8	(France) Nina Arthaud	22+	26	37.5+	24+

== Kranj, Slovenia (September, 28–29) ==
72 men and 53 women attended the event.

In men's, Czech Republic's Adam Ondra, having just won the Lead World Championships in August, claimed the only top of the final route, securing the win. Japan's Kai Harada took second place and Spain's Alberto Ginés López took third.

In women's, South Korea's Chaehyun Seo continued her winning streak, claiming her third gold medal. Austria's Jessica Pilz took second place and Slovenia's Lucka Rakovec took third. Japan's Ai Mori topped both qualification routes and led the field in the semi-fnal round, but struggled in the final and had to settle for 5th place. Slovenia's Janja Garnbret, having just won the Lead World Championships in August, struggled in the semi-final and placed 13th. This event marked the return of South Korea's Jain Kim to the World Cup circuit after her finger injury. Kim placed 9th, barely missing a spot in the final.

Men						Women					
Rank	Name	Qualification		Semi-Final	Final	Rank	Name	Qualification		Semi-Final	Final
Rank	Name	R1	R2	Semi-Final	Final	Rank	Name	R1	R2	Semi-Final	Final
1st place, gold medalist(s)	(Czech Republic) Adam Ondra	TOP	TOP	39+	TOP	1st place, gold medalist(s)	(South Korea) Chaehyun Seo	TOP	29+	38	34.5+
2nd place, silver medalist(s)	(Japan) Kai Harada	TOP	TOP	35+	32	2nd place, silver medalist(s)	(Austria) Jessica Pilz	TOP	29+	34+	34.5
3rd place, bronze medalist(s)	(Spain) Alberto Ginés López	TOP	TOP	29+	31.5+	3rd place, bronze medalist(s)	(Slovenia) Lucka Rakovec	36+	29+	38+	34+
4	(Canada) Sean McColl	37+	35	27+	30+	4	(Belgium) Anak Verhoeven	TOP	35+	34+	34+
5	(Japan) Kokoro Fujii	TOP	TOP	28+	27+	5	(Japan) Ai Mori	TOP	TOP	38+	20+
6	(Italy) Stefano Ghisolfi	TOP	TOP	30+	25+	6	(Japan) Natsumi Hirano	TOP	27+	37+	20+
7	(Austria) Jakob Schubert	37+	TOP	37+	12+	7	(Slovenia) Mia Krampl	TOP	32+	34+	20+
8	(Czech Republic) Martin Stráník	37+	35	30+	12+	8	(Japan) Mei Kotake	TOP	23	34+	20+

== Xiamen, China (October, 18–20) ==
55 men and 51 women attended the event.

In men's, Czech Republic's Adam Ondra claimed his third win, undefeated in the lead events he participated in. Japan's Taisei Homma and Tomoa Narasaki placed second third respectively. Japan's Kai Harada led the semi-final round but fell short in the final round, placing 4th.

In women's, South Korea's Chaehyun Seo topped all the routes of the event, securing her fourth consecutive win and the overall Lead World Champion title. Japan's Akiyo Noguchi claimed second place, while South Korea's Jain Kim claimed third. Slovenia's Janja Garnbret, along with Seo, topped qualification and semi-final routes, but fell trying to jump to the top on the final route, thus finishing in 4th place.

Men						Women					
Rank	Name	Qualification		Semi-Final	Final	Rank	Name	Qualification		Semi-Final	Final
Rank	Name	R1	R2	Semi-Final	Final	Rank	Name	R1	R2	Semi-Final	Final
1st place, gold medalist(s)	(Czech Republic) Adam Ondra	TOP	TOP	31+	TOP	1st place, gold medalist(s)	(South Korea) Chaehyun Seo	TOP	TOP	TOP	TOP
2nd place, silver medalist(s)	(Japan) Taisei Homma	37+	TOP	31+	TOP	2nd place, silver medalist(s)	(Japan) Akiyo Noguchi	35+	TOP	38+	TOP
3rd place, bronze medalist(s)	(Japan) Tomoa Narasaki	37	TOP	31+	TOP	3rd place, bronze medalist(s)	(South Korea) Jain Kim	35+	TOP	38+	TOP
4	(Japan) Kai Harada	TOP	TOP	35+	31+	4	(Slovenia) Janja Garnbret	TOP	TOP	TOP	37+
5	(Spain) Alberto Ginés López	TOP	TOP	31+	29+	5	(Japan) Natsuki Tanii	35+	TOP	33.5	37+
6	(Japan) Meichi Narasaki	38	TOP	31+	26	6	(Slovenia) Lucka Rakovec	TOP	TOP	33+	37+
7	(United States) Jesse Grupper	TOP	TOP	31+	25+	7	(China) YueTong Zhang	35+	TOP	TOP	34+
8	(United States) Sean Bailey	37+	TOP	31+	23+	8	(Ukraine) Ievgeniia Kazbekova	35+	TOP	36+	31+
						9	(Japan) Ai Mori	TOP	TOP	33+	10+

== Inzai, Japan (October, 26–27) ==
54 men and 52 women attended the event.

In men's, Japan's Hiroto Shimizu claimed the gold medal. Spain's Alberto Ginés López placed second and Italy's Stefano Ghisolfi third. Czech Republic's Adam Ondra, absent from the competition, claimed the lead season's champion title.

In women's, South Korea's veteran Jain Kim topped the final route and secured the win, claiming her 30th gold medal in the World Cup competitions. Slovenia's Janja Garnbret was leading the competition coming into the final, but could not match Kim's top in the final round, thus placed second. South Korea's Chaehyun Seo, the lead season's overall champion, finished in third place.

Men						Women					
Rank	Name	Qualification		Semi-Final	Final	Rank	Name	Qualification		Semi-Final	Final
Rank	Name	R1	R2	Semi-Final	Final	Rank	Name	R1	R2	Semi-Final	Final
1st place, gold medalist(s)	(Japan) Hiroto Shimizu	38+	38+	32+	38+	1st place, gold medalist(s)	(South Korea) Jain Kim	TOP	TOP	33+	TOP
2nd place, silver medalist(s)	(Spain) Alberto Ginés López	34+	TOP	TOP	36+	2nd place, silver medalist(s)	(Slovenia) Janja Garnbret	TOP	TOP	41	39
3rd place, bronze medalist(s)	(Italy) Stefano Ghisolfi	38+	TOP	32+	32+	3rd place, bronze medalist(s)	(South Korea) Chaehyun Seo	35+	35+	33+	37+
4	(Japan) Yuki Hada	38+	TOP	31+	28+	4	(Japan) Akiyo Noguchi	TOP	TOP	30	36+
5	(United States) Jesse Grupper	31+	17+	30+	28+	5	(Japan) Miho Nonaka	35+	TOP	28+	34+
6	(Canada) Sean McColl	38+	2+	34	27+	6	(Japan) Natsuki Tanii	TOP	35	28+	34+
7	(Belgium) Loïc Timmermans	30+	33+	30+	22+	7	(Italy) Laura Rogora	TOP	36	28+	20
8	(United States) Sean Bailey	35+	31+	34	19+	8	(Japan) Aika Tajima	30+	35+	29	19+
9	(Japan) Meichi Narasaki	31+	17+	30+	19+						
