= Sport climbing at the 2024 Summer Olympics – Women's combined =

Women's combined at the Games of the XXXIII Olympiad
- Olympic sport climbing
- Venue: Le Bourget Sport Climbing Venue, Paris
- Dates: 6–8 August 2024 (semifinals); 10 August 2024 (final)
- Competitors: 20 from 13 nations

Medalists
1st place, gold medalist(s)		Janja Garnbret	Slovenia
2nd place, silver medalist(s)		Brooke Raboutou	United States
3rd place, bronze medalist(s)		Jessica Pilz	Austria

The women's competition climbing combined event at the 2024 Summer Olympics took place from 6 to 10 August 2024 at Le Bourget Sport Climbing Venue in Paris. It marked the second Olympics to feature this event as part of the programme. Competition climbing only received one women's event that combined bouldering, lead, and speed climbing at the 2020 Summer Olympics in Tokyo. The 2024 Olympic event retained the bouldering and lead climbing disciplines, while speed climbing was spun off into its own event.

== Schedule ==
All times are Central European Time (UTC+02:00)

Date	Time	Event
6 August 2024	10:00	Bouldering Semifinals
8 August 2024	10:00	Lead Semifinals
10 August 2024	10:15	Bouldering Final
10 August 2024	12:35	Lead Final

== Results ==
=== Bouldering semifinal ===
The women's bouldering semifinal took place on 6 August 2024.

Rank	Athlete	Boulder				Total
Rank	Athlete	1	2	3	4	Total
1	Janja Garnbret (SLO)	25.0	25.0	24.9	24.7	99.6
2	Oriane Bertone (FRA)	24.9	24.9	25.0	9.7	84.5
3	Brooke Raboutou (USA)	24.4	24.9	9.8	24.6	83.7
4	Oceana Mackenzie (AUS)	25.0	24.9	24.8	4.9	79.6
5	Natalia Grossman (USA)	9.8	25.0	9.8	24.6	69.2
6	Jessica Pilz (AUT)	9.8	10.0	24.5	24.5	68.8
7	Miho Nonaka (JPN)	24.8	24.6	10.0	5.0	64.4
8	Camilla Moroni (ITA)	5.0	24.5	10.0	24.5	64.0
9	Luo Zhilu (CHN)	4.8	24.9	9.4	24.5	63.6
10	Erin McNeice (GBR)	5.0	24.7	24.9	5.0	59.6
11	Ai Mori (JPN)	0.0	24.6	4.7	24.7	54.0
12	Zélia Avezou (FRA)	4.7	24.7	10.0	9.9	49.3
13	Seo Chae-hyun (KOR)	5.0	24.8	9.7	4.7	44.2
14	Jenya Kazbekova (UKR)	4.9	24.8	5.0	4.8	39.5
15	Zhang Yuetong (CHN)	4.8	10.0	10.0	4.9	29.7
16	Lucia Dörffel (GER)	5.0	9.7	9.8	4.7	29.2
17	Mia Krampl (SLO)	4.6	9.9	9.7	4.2	28.4
18	Laura Rogora (ITA)	0.0	4.4	5.0	3.8	13.2
19	Molly Thompson-Smith (GBR)	0.0	4.8	5.0	0.0	9.8
20	Lauren Mukheibir (RSA)	0.0	0.0	0.0	0.0	0.0

=== Lead semifinal ===
The women's lead semifinal took place on 8 August 2024.

Rank	Athlete	Lead points		
Rank	Athlete	1	Janja Garnbret (SLO)	96.1
Ai Mori (JPN)		1		96.1
3	Jessica Pilz (AUT)	88.1		
4	Brooke Raboutou (USA)	72.1		
4	Seo Chae-hyun (KOR)	72.1		
6	Zhang Yuetong (CHN)	68.0		
7	Erin McNeice (GBR)	64.1		
8	Laura Rogora (ITA)	57.1		
9	Molly Thompson-Smith (GBR)	57.0		
10	Miho Nonaka (JPN)	51.1		
10	Lucia Dörffel (GER)	51.1		
10	Mia Krampl (SLO)	51.1		
13	Luo Zhilu (CHN)	48.1		
14	Oriane Bertone (FRA)	45.1		
14	Oceana Mackenzie (AUS)	45.1		
14	Zélia Avezou (FRA)	45.1		
14	Jenya Kazbekova (UKR)	45.1		
18	Natalia Grossman (USA)	39.1		
19	Camilla Moroni (ITA)	36.1		
20	Lauren Mukheibir (RSA)	4.1		

=== Standings ===
Following both semifinals, the scores for each athlete were combined to calculate a total score. The eight competitors with the highest score qualified for the final.

Rank	Athlete	Total points	Notes
1	Janja Garnbret (SLO)	195.7	Q
2	Jessica Pilz (AUT)	156.9	Q
3	Brooke Raboutou (USA)	155.8	Q
4	Ai Mori (JPN)	150.1	Q
5	Oriane Bertone (FRA)	129.6	Q
6	Oceana Mackenzie (AUS)	124.7	Q
7	Erin McNeice (GBR)	123.7	Q
8	Seo Chae-hyun (KOR)	116.3	Q
9	Miho Nonaka (JPN)	115.5	
10	Luo Zhilu (CHN)	111.7	
11	Natalia Grossman (USA)	108.3	
12	Camilla Moroni (ITA)	100.1	
13	Zhang Yuetong (CHN)	97.7	
14	Zélia Avezou (FRA)	94.4	
15	Jenya Kazbekova (UKR)	84.6	
16	Lucia Dörffel (GER)	80.3	
17	Mia Krampl (SLO)	79.5	
18	Laura Rogora (ITA)	70.3	
19	Molly Thompson-Smith (GBR)	66.8	
20	Lauren Mukheibir (RSA)	4.1	

=== Final ===
The women's combined lead and bouldering final took place on 10 August 2024.

Rank	Athlete	Bouldering points	Lead points	Total points
1st place, gold medalist(s)	Janja Garnbret (SLO)	84.4	84.1	168.5
2nd place, silver medalist(s)	Brooke Raboutou (USA)	84.0	72.0	156.0
3rd place, bronze medalist(s)	Jessica Pilz (AUT)	59.3	88.1	147.4
4	Ai Mori (JPN)	39.0	96.1	135.1
5	Erin McNeice (GBR)	59.5	68.1	127.6
6	Seo Chae-hyun (KOR)	28.9	76.1	105.0
7	Oceana Mackenzie (AUS)	59.7	45.1	104.8
8	Oriane Bertone (FRA)	59.5	45.0	104.5

== See also ==
- Sport climbing at the 2024 Summer Olympics – Men's combined
