= Lee Do-hyun (climber) =

South Korean climber (born 2002)

Lee Dohyun
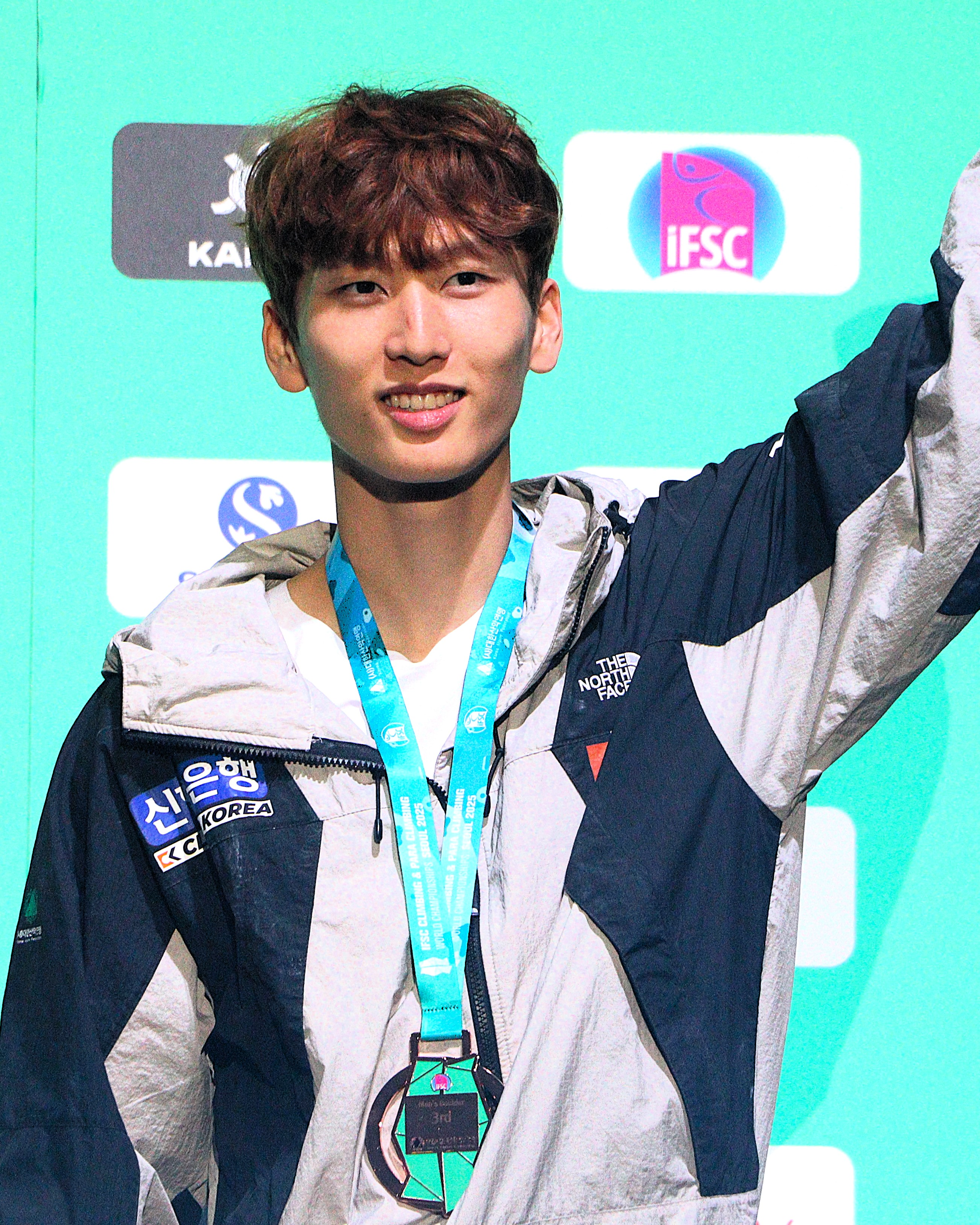

Personal information
- Nationality: South Korean
- Born: October 8, 2002 (age 24)

Climbing career
- Type of climber: Competition bouldering; Competition lead climbing
Medal record
Men's competition climbing
Representing Republic of Korea
World Championships
Gold medal – first place	Seoul 2025	Lead
Bronze medal – third place	Seoul 2025	Bouldering
Bronze medal – third place	Bern 2023	Bouldering
World Cup (Overall)
Second place	2023	Bouldering
Second place	2026	Bouldering
World Cup
Gold medal – first place	Seoul 2024	Bouldering
Gold medal – first place	Prague 2024	Bouldering
Gold medal – first place	Prague 2023	Bouldering
Gold medal – first place	Madrid 2025	Lead
Silver medal – second place	Prague 2026	Bouldering
Silver medal – second place	Keqiao 2026	Bouldering
Silver medal – second place	Keqiao 2025	Bouldering
Silver medal – second place	Brixen 2023	Bouldering
Silver medal – second place	Innsbruck 2022	Bouldering
Silver medal – second place	Seoul 2024	Lead
Bronze medal – third place	Innsbruck 2026	Bouldering
Bronze medal – third place	Salt Lake City 2025	Bouldering
Bronze medal – third place	Wujiang 2026	Lead
Asian Games
Silver medal – second place	2022 Hangzhou	Combined
Silver medal – second place	2026 Aichi-Nagoya	Boulder
Bronze medal – third place	2026 Aichi-Nagoya	Lead
Asian Championships
Gold medal – first place	2026 Meishan	Bouldering

Lee Dohyun (Korean: 이도현, born October 8, 2002), also known as Dohyun Lee, is a South Korean rock climber who specializes in competition climbing, particularly in competition bouldering and competition lead climbing.

== Climbing career ==
Lee started competing in international youth competition climbing events in 2016. He started competing on the international senior circuit at IFSC Climbing World Cups in 2019.

In 2022, Lee won his first World Cup medal at the Boulder World Cup in Innsbruck, placing second. He finished the season in seventh place in the overall ranking for bouldering.

In 2023, Lee won his first World Cup gold medal at the Boulder World Cup in Prague. He finished the season in second place in the overall ranking for bouldering. He went on to win a bronze medal in bouldering at the 2023 IFSC Climbing World Championships, finishing in fourth place in lead climbing and in seventh place in the combined bouldering and lead climbing event.

In 2024, Lee placed first in the rankings of the combined bouldering and lead climbing event at the Olympic Qualifier Series, securing a spot for the combined event at the 2024 Summer Olympics in Paris. At the Olympics, Lee finished in fifteenth place in the semifinals of the combined event and did not move on to finals. Lee went on to defend his gold medal at the Boulder World Cup in Prague. He finished out the season by winning a gold medal in bouldering followed by a silver medal in lead at the World Cup in Seoul, becoming one of only three male climbers to win medals in bouldering and lead at the same event. He finished the season in sixth place in the overall ranking for bouldering and thirteenth place in the overall ranking for lead.

== Rankings ==
=== IFSC Climbing World Cup ===
Discipline	2019	2022	2023	2024	2025	2026
Lead	47	15	36	13	5	8
Bouldering	-	7	2	6	4	2

=== IFSC Climbing World Championships ===
Youth

Discipline	2016 Youth B	2017 Youth B	2018 Youth A
Lead	42	29	9
Bouldering	35	20	10
Speed	-	48	-
Combined	-	23	-

Senior

Discipline	Hachioji 2019	Bern 2023	Seoul 2025
Lead	66	4	1
Bouldering	75	3	3
Speed	53	-	-
Combined	61	7	-

== Number of medals at the IFSC Climbing World Cup ==
=== Bouldering ===
Season	Gold	Silver	Bronze	Total
2022		1		1
2023	1	1		2
2024	2			2
2025		1	1	2
2026		2	1	3
Total	3	5	2	10

=== Lead ===
Season	Gold	Silver	Bronze	Total
2024		1		1
2025	1			1
2026			1	1
Total	1	1	1	3
