= 2019 IFSC Climbing World Cup =

International sport climbing competition

- Organiser: IFSC
- Edition: 31st
- Events: 18: 6 Boulder 6 Lead 6 Speed
- Locations: 12: Meiringen, Switzerland Moscow, Russia Chongqing, China Wujiang, China Munich, Germany Vail, United States Villars, Switzerland Chamonix, France Briançon, France Kranj, Slovenia Xiamen, China Inzai, Japan
- Dates: 5 April – 27 October 2019

Lead
- Men: (Czech Republic) Adam Ondra
- Women: (South Korea) Seo Chae-hyun
- Team: Japan

Boulder
- Men: (Japan) Tomoa Narasaki
- Women: (Slovenia) Janja Garnbret
- Team: Japan

Speed
- Men: (France) Bassa Mawem
- Women: (China) Song Yiling
- Team: Russia

Combined
- Men: (Japan) Tomoa Narasaki
- Women: (Slovenia) Janja Garnbret

The 2019 IFSC Climbing World Cup was held in 12 locations. Bouldering, lead and speed competitions were each held in 6 locations. The season began on 5 April in Meiringen, Switzerland with the first bouldering competition in the season, and concluded on 27 October in Inzai, Japan, with the last lead climbing competition in the season.

The top 3 in each competition received medals, and the overall winners were awarded trophies. At the end of the season an overall ranking was determined based upon points, which athletes were awarded for finishing in the top 30 of each individual event.

== Olympic qualification ==
For the Tokyo 2020 Olympics athletes can qualify through either the IFSC Combined World Championships, the Olympic Qualifying Event or the Continental Championships. The Olympic Qualifying Event is an invitation only event open to the 22 highest ranked climbers on the World Cup circuit who haven't already qualified.

== Highlights of the season ==
In bouldering, at the World Cup in Moscow, Janja Garnbret of Slovenia flashed all boulders in the final round to take the win. At the World Cup in Vail, Garnbret won her sixth consecutive gold medal and became the first climber ever to make a clean sweep of Bouldering World Cup season by winning six out of six events held this year. Moreover, she also became the first female climber to win overall World Cup season titles in lead (2016, 2017, 2018) and bouldering (2019). Ai Mori of Japan, in her first year of open eligibility, made her the World Cup debut in Meiringen, then won her first medal (bronze) at the World Cup in Wujiang, China.

In speed, at the World Cup in Chongqing, YiLing Song of China set a new world record of 7.101s, breaking the previous world record of 7.32s set by Iuliia Kaplina of Russia at the 2017 World Games in Wroclaw and Anouck Jaubert of France at the 2018 Speed World Cup in Moscow. At the World Cup in Xiamen, Aries Susanti Rahayu of Indonesia set a new world record of 6.995s in the final race, breaking Song's 7.101s, and becoming the first woman in the history of the sport to record a time under 7 seconds.

In lead, Chaehyun Seo of South Korea, in her first year of open eligibility, made her World Cup debut in Villars and claimed her first medal (silver) there. Then, she won the next 4 Lead World Cups and placed third in the last one, finishing her debut season with a 2019 Lead World Cup Season Champion title. Also in her debut season, Natsuki Tanii of Japan earned her first medal (bronze) in Briançon and continued her consistent performance throughout the season and thus claiming third place of the overall lead season ranking. Other notable athletes in their World Cup debut season: Ai Mori (JPN), YueTong Zhang (CHN).

== Overview ==
No.	Location	D	G	Gold		Silver		Bronze	
1	(Switzerland) Meiringen, Switzerland; April, 5–6	B	M	(Czech Republic) Adam Ondra	4T4z 10 9	(Japan) Tomoa Narasaki	3T3z 7 6	(Japan) Rei Sugimoto	2T3z 6 7
1	(Switzerland) Meiringen, Switzerland; April, 5–6	B	W	(Slovenia) Janja Garnbret	3T4z 6 6	(Japan) Akiyo Noguchi	3T4z 9 12	(United Kingdom) Shauna Coxsey	2T3z 3 4
2	(Russia) Moscow, Russia; April, 12–14	B	M	(Slovenia) Jernej Kruder	4T4z 8 6	(Czech Republic) Adam Ondra	3T4z 5 7	(Japan) Yoshiyuki Ogata	3T3z 6 5
2	(Russia) Moscow, Russia; April, 12–14	B	W	(Slovenia) Janja Garnbret	4T4z 4 4	(United Kingdom) Shauna Coxsey	4T4z 6 6	(France) Fanny Gibert	4T4z 6 6
2	(Russia) Moscow, Russia; April, 12–14	S	M	(France) Bassa Mawem	5.730	(Russia) Vladislav Deulin	11.545	(Indonesia) Aspar Jaelolo	6.083
2	(Russia) Moscow, Russia; April, 12–14	S	W	(China) YiLing Song	7.389	(France) Anouck Jaubert	7.682	(Russia) Iuliia Kaplina	8.233
3	(China) Chongqing, China; April, 26–28	B	M	(France) Manuel Cornu	3T4z 5 5	(Japan) Tomoa Narasaki	3T4z 5 6	(Slovenia) Anze Peharc	3T4z 10 10
3	(China) Chongqing, China; April, 26–28	B	W	(Slovenia) Janja Garnbret	4T4z 8 6	(Japan) Akiyo Noguchi	4T4z 12 9	(Austria) Jessica Pilz	3T4z 8 11
3	(China) Chongqing, China; April, 26–28	S	M	(Indonesia) Alfian Muhammad	5.970	(Ukraine) Kostiantyn Pavlenko	6.315	(Russia) Sergey Rukin	6.808
3	(China) Chongqing, China; April, 26–28	S	W	(China) YiLing Song	7.673	(Poland) Aleksandra Rudzinska	fall	(Russia) Iuliia Kaplina	8.429
4	(China) Wujiang, China; May, 3–5	B	M	(Japan) Tomoa Narasaki	3T4z 7 8	(Japan) Kai Harada	3T4z 7 13	(Austria) Jakob Schubert	1T4z 2 9
4	(China) Wujiang, China; May, 3–5	B	W	(Slovenia) Janja Garnbret	4T4z 5 4	(Japan) Akiyo Noguchi	3T4z 4 5	(Japan) Ai Mori	3T4z 11 9
4	(China) Wujiang, China; May, 3–5	S	M	(Russia) Dmitrii Timofeev	5.597	(France) Bassa Mawem	5.810	(Italy) Ludovico Fossali	5.856
4	(China) Wujiang, China; May, 3–5	S	W	(Poland) Aleksandra Rudzinska	7.313	(Indonesia) Aries Susanti Rahayu	7.607	(France) Anouck Jaubert	7.516
5	(Germany) Munich, Germany; May, 18–19	B	M	(Austria) Jakob Schubert	3T4z 7 8	(Czech Republic) Adam Ondra	3T3z 3 3	(Germany) Jan Hojer	2T4z 4 14
5	(Germany) Munich, Germany; May, 18–19	B	W	(Slovenia) Janja Garnbret	4T4z 5 5	(France) Fanny Gibert	4T4z 8 7	(Slovenia) Mia Krampl	3T3z 9 9
6	(United States) Vail, United States; June, 7–8	B	M	(Japan) Yoshiyuki Ogata	4T4z 11 9	(Japan) Tomoa Narasaki	3T4z 5 5	(South Korea) Jongwon Chon	3T4z 6 7
6	(United States) Vail, United States; June, 7–8	B	W	(Slovenia) Janja Garnbret	4T4z 9 8	(Japan) Akiyo Noguchi	3T4z 5 6	(France) Fanny Gibert	2T4z 3 9
7	(Switzerland) Villars, Switzerland; July, 4–6	L	M	(Switzerland) Sascha Lehmann	Top	(China) YuFei Pan	Top	(Germany) Alexander Megos	Top
7	(Switzerland) Villars, Switzerland; July, 4–6	L	W	(Slovenia) Janja Garnbret	36+	(South Korea) Chaehyun Seo	35+	(Japan) Ai Mori	35+
7	(Switzerland) Villars, Switzerland; July, 4–6	S	M	(Russia) Aleksandr Shikov	5.542	(Russia) Dmitrii Timofeev	fall	(Czech Republic) Jan Kriz	7.765
7	(Switzerland) Villars, Switzerland; July, 4–6	S	W	(France) Anouck Jaubert	7.660	(China) YiLing Song	8.415	(Russia) Elizaveta Ivanova	7.586
8	(France) Chamonix, France; July, 11–13	L	M	(Czech Republic) Adam Ondra	47+	(Germany) Alexander Megos	44	(Austria) Jakob Schubert	43+
8	(France) Chamonix, France; July, 11–13	L	W	(South Korea) Chaehyun Seo	34+	(China) YueTong Zhang	34+	(Austria) Jessica Pilz	34+
8	(France) Chamonix, France; July, 11–13	S	M	(Indonesia) Alfian Muhammad	5.764	(China) QiXin Zhong	6.382	(Russia) Vladislav Deulin	6.057
8	(France) Chamonix, France; July, 11–13	S	W	(China) YiLing Song	99.000	(Russia) Elizaveta Ivanova	false start	(Poland) Aleksandra Kalucka	7.661
9	(France) Briançon, France; July, 19–20	L	M	(Japan) Hidemasa Nishida	39+	(Japan) Hiroto Shimizu	38+	(Japan) Shuta Tanaka	38+
9	(France) Briançon, France; July, 19–20	L	W	(South Korea) Chaehyun Seo	Top	(Slovenia) Janja Garnbret	Top	(Japan) Natsuki Tanii	41+
10	(Slovenia) Kranj, Slovenia; September, 28–29	L	M	(Czech Republic) Adam Ondra	Top	(Japan) Kai Harada	32	(Spain) Alberto Ginés López	31.5
10	(Slovenia) Kranj, Slovenia; September, 28–29	L	W	(South Korea) Chaehyun Seo	34.5+	(Austria) Jessica Pilz	34.5	(Slovenia) Lucka Rakovec	34+
11	(China) Xiamen, China; October, 18–20	L	M	(Czech Republic) Adam Ondra	Top	(Japan) Taisei Homma	Top	(Japan) Tomoa Narasaki	Top
11	(China) Xiamen, China; October, 18–20	L	W	(South Korea) Chaehyun Seo	Top	(Japan) Akiyo Noguchi	Top	(South Korea) Jain Kim	Top
11	(China) Xiamen, China; October, 18–20	S	M	(China) QiXin Zhong	7.208	(Russia) Lev Rudatskiy	fall	(Russia) Vladislav Deulin	5.635
11	(China) Xiamen, China; October, 18–20	S	W	(Indonesia) Aries Susanti Rahayu	6.995	(China) YiLing Song	9.032	(Russia) Mariia Krasavina	7.947
12	(Japan) Inzai, Japan; October, 26–27	L	M	(Japan) Hiroto Shimizu	38+	(Spain) Alberto Ginés López	36+	(Italy) Stefano Ghisolfi	32+
12	(Japan) Inzai, Japan; October, 26–27	L	W	(South Korea) Jain Kim	Top	(Slovenia) Janja Garnbret	39	(South Korea) Chaehyun Seo	37+
OVERALL		B	M	(Japan) Tomoa Narasaki	340.00	(Czech Republic) Adam Ondra	335.00	(Japan) Yoshiyuki Ogata	264.00
OVERALL		B	W	(Slovenia) Janja Garnbret	500.00	(Japan) Akiyo Noguchi	320.00	(France) Fanny Gibert	308.00
OVERALL		L	M	(Czech Republic) Adam Ondra	300.00	(Spain) Alberto Ginés López	256.00	(Canada) Sean McColl	206.00
OVERALL		L	W	(South Korea) Chaehyun Seo	480.00	(Slovenia) Janja Garnbret	352.00	(Japan) Natsuki Tanii	243.00
OVERALL		S	M	(France) Bassa Mawem	329.00	(Russia) Vladislav Deulin	312.00	(Indonesia) Alfian Muhammad	286.00
OVERALL		S	W	(China) YiLing Song	460.00	(France) Anouck Jaubert	355.00	(Indonesia) Aries Susanti Rahayu	333.00
OVERALL		C	M	(Japan) Tomoa Narasaki	1728	(Czech Republic) Adam Ondra	2072	(Austria) Jakob Schubert	27720
OVERALL		C	W	(Slovenia) Janja Garnbret	255	(Japan) Akiyo Noguchi	4104	(Austria) Jessica Pilz	14400
NATIONAL TEAMS		B	A	Japan	1693	Slovenia	1359	France	766
NATIONAL TEAMS		L	A	Japan	1695	Slovenia	988	South Korea	758
NATIONAL TEAMS		S	A	Russia	1637	China	1375	France	1004

== Bouldering ==
The overall ranking is determined based upon points, which athletes are awarded for finishing in the top 30 of each individual event. There are six competitions in the season, but only the best five attempts are counted. The national ranking is the sum of the points of that country's three best male and female athletes. Results displayed in parentheses are not counted.

=== Men ===
The results of the ten most successful athletes of the Bouldering World Cup 2019:

Rank	Name	Points	Meiringen	Moscow	Chongqing	Wujiang	Munich	Vail
1	(Japan) Tomoa Narasaki	340	2. 80	( — )	2. 80	1. 100	( — )	2. 80
2	(Czech Republic) Adam Ondra	335	1. 100	2. 80	( — )	14. 24	2. 80	5. 51
3	(Japan) Yoshiyuki Ogata	264	8. 40	3. 65	(29. 1)	9. 37	15. 22	1. 100
4	(South Korea) Chon Jong-won	228	5. 51	10. 34	(15. 22)	11. 31	6. 47	3. 65
5	(Japan) Kokoro Fujii	227	4. 55	9. 37	6. 47	5. 51	( — )	9. 37
6	(Germany) Jan Hojer	223	(21. 9 *)	12. 28	12. 28	6. 47	3. 65	4. 55
7	(Russia) Alexey Rubtsov	214	7. 43	11. 31	5. 51	10. 34	4. 55	( — )
8	(Slovenia) Anže Peharc	205	15. 22	4. 55	3. 65	20. 12	5. 51	( — )
9	(Slovenia) Jernej Kruder	191	11. 31	1. 100	(34. 0)	16. 20	11. 31	21. 9
10	(Austria) Jakob Schubert	184	47. 0	27. 3	18. 16	3. 65	1. 100	( — )

=== Women ===
The results of the ten most successful athletes of the Bouldering World Cup 2019:

Rank	Name	Points	Meiringen	Moscow	Chongqing	Wujiang	Munich	Vail
1	(Slovenia) Janja Garnbret	500	1. 100	1. 100	1. 100	1. 100	1. 100	(1. 100)
2	(Japan) Akiyo Noguchi	320	2. 80	( — )	2. 80	2. 80	( — )	2. 80
3	(France) Fanny Gibert	308	4. 55	3. 65	7. 43	(13. 25) *	2. 80	3. 65
4	(Japan) Futaba Ito	206	9. 37	6. 47	5. 51	7. 43	( — )	12. 28
5	(Austria) Jessica Pilz	203	21. 9 *	5. 51	3. 65	5. 51	12. 27 *	( — )
6	(Switzerland) Petra Klingler	180	5. 51	8. 40	4. 55	10. 34	( — )	( — )
7	(Slovenia) Lučka Rakovec	163	16. 20	4. 55	12. 28	15. 22	8. 38 *	( — )
8	(Slovenia) Katja Kadic	161	12. 28	19. 14	6. 47	13. 25 *	6. 47	( — )
9	(France) Julia Chanourdie	157	17. 17 *	( 31. 0 )	14. 24	6. 47	4. 55	19. 14
10	(United Kingdom) Shauna Coxsey	145	3. 65	2. 80	( — )	( — )	( — )	( — )
10	(Ukraine) Ievgeniia Kazbekova	145	13. 26	10. 32 *	25. 5 *	11. 31	5. 51	( — )

* = Joint place with another athlete

=== National Teams ===
The results of the ten most successful countries of the Bouldering World Cup 2019:

Country names as used by the IFSC

Rank	Name	Points	Meiringen	Moscow	Chongqing	Wujiang	Munich	Vail
1	Japan	1693	322	210	321	435	(86)	405
2	Slovenia	1359	213	331	280	201	334	(109)
3	France	766	(75)	151	205	104	149	157
4	Austria	591	75	99	84	137	196	(15)
5	Germany	534	63	80	74	(61)	131	186
6	United States of America	468	102	49	89	(38)	48	180
7	(Russia) Russian Federation	396	43	136	55	79	83	(—)
8	(South Korea) Republic of Korea	353	68	77	(34)	78	47	83
9	Czech Republic	336	100	81	(0)	24	80	51
10	(United Kingdom) Great Britain	330	101	119	34	9	67	(6)

== Lead ==
The overall ranking is determined based upon points, which athletes are awarded for finishing in the top 30 of each individual event. There are six competitions in the season, but only the best five attempts are counted. The national ranking is the sum of the points of that country's three best male and female athletes. Results displayed in parentheses are not counted.

=== Men ===
The results of the ten most successful athletes of the Lead World Cup 2019:

Rank	NAME	Points	Inzai	Xiamen	Kranj	Briançon	Chamonix	Villars
1	(Czech Republic) Adam Ondra	300.00	( — )	1. 100.00	1. 100.00	( — )	1. 100.00	( — )
2	(Spain) Alberto Ginés López	256.00	2. 80.00	5. 51.00	3. 65.00	22. 9.00	5. 51.00	26. (5.00)
3	(Canada) Sean McColl	206.00	6. 47.00	26. (5.00)	4. 55.00	5. 51.00	7. 43.00	21. 10.00
4	(Japan) Kai Harada	195.00	25. 6.00	4. 55.00	2. 80.00	( — )	8. 40.00	19. 14.00
5	(Italy) Stefano Ghisolfi	190.00	3. 65.00	13. 25.00	6. 47.00	15. 22.00	26. (5.00)	11. 31.00
6	(Japan) Hiroto Shimizu	180.00	1. 100.00	( — )	( — )	2. 80.00	( — )	( — )
7	(Japan) Kokoro Fujii	165.00	20. 12.00	11. 31.00	5. 51.00	( — )	11. 31.00	8. 40.00
7	(Germany) Alexander Megos	165.00	( — )	( — )	( — )	16. 20.00	2. 80.00	3. 65.00
9	(United States) Sean Bailey	158.00	8. 40.00	8. 40.00	14. 24.00	6. 47.00	24. 7.00	( — )
10	(Switzerland) Sascha Lehmann	152.00	( — )	( — )	( — )	13. 26.00	13. 26.00	1. 100.00

=== Women ===
The results of the ten most successful athletes of the Lead World Cup 2019:

Rank	NAME	Points	Inzai	Xiamen	Kranj	Briançon	Chamonix	Villars
1	(South Korea) Seo Chae-hyun	480.00	3. (65.00)	1. 100.00	1. 100.00	1. 100.00	1. 100.00	2. 80.00
2	(Slovenia) Janja Garnbret	352.00	2. 80.00	4. 55.00	13. (26.00)	2. 80.00	9. 37.00	1. 100.00
3	(Japan) Natsuki Tanii	243.00	6. 47.00	5. 51.00	( — )	3. 65.00	8. 40.00	8. 40.00
4	(Slovenia) Lucka Rakovec	226.00	16. (20.00)	6. 47.00	3. 65.00	14. 24.00	7. 43.00	6. 47.00
5	(Japan) Akiyo Noguchi	224.00	4. 55.00	2. 80.00	( — )	( — )	10. 34.00	4. 55.00
6	(Japan) Ai Mori	220.00	20. 12.00	9. 37.00	5. 51.00	( — )	4. 55.00	3. 65.00
7	(China) Zhang Yuetong	207.00	( — )	7. 43.00	( — )	6. 47.00	2. 80.00	9. 37.00
8	(South Korea) Jain Kim	206.00	1. 100.00	3. 65.00	9. 37.00	( — )	( — )	27. 4.00
9	(Slovenia) Mia Krampl	189.00	22. 9.00	24. (7.00)	7. 43.00	4. 55.00	11. 31.00	5. 51.00
10	(Austria) Jessica Pilz	176.00	( — )	( — )	2. 80.00	( — )	3. 65.00	11. 31.00

=== National Teams ===
The results of the ten most successful countries of the Lead World Cup 2019:

Country names as used by the IFSC

Rank	Nation	Points	Inzai	Xiamen	Kranj	Briançon	Chamonix	Villars
1	Japan	1695	345	368	306	375	(220)	301
2	Slovenia	988	(109)	112	210	224	139	303
3	(South Korea) Republic of Korea	758	174	206	137	116	(106)	125
4	United States of America	612	151	103	75	179	104	(22)
5	Austria	525	(47)	53	143	91	166	72
6	Czech Republic	484	18	136	146	(0)	147	37
7	France	440	66	(44)	65	112	111	86
8	Italy	434	115	90	91	87	(29)	51
9	Germany	381	(24)	79	30	51	138	83
10	(United Kingdom) Great Britain	360	68	62	(31)	75	110	45

== Speed ==
The overall ranking is determined based upon points, which athletes are awarded for finishing in the top 30 of each individual event. There are six competitions in the season, but only the best five attempts are counted. The national ranking is the sum of the points of that country's three best male and female athletes. Results displayed in parentheses are not counted.

=== Men ===
The results of the ten most successful athletes of the Speed World Cup 2019:

Rank	NAME	Points	Xiamen	Chamonix	Villars	Wujiang	Chongqing	Moscow
1	(France) Bassa Mawem	329.00	5. 51.00	7. 43.00	4. 55.00	2. 80.00	15. (22.00)	1. 100.00
2	(Russia) Vladislav Deulin	312.00	3. 65.00	3. 65.00	5. 51.00	5. 51.00	14. (24.00)	2. 80.00
3	(Indonesia) Alfian Muhammad	286.00	8. 40.00	1. 100.00	20. 12.00	10. 34.00	1. 100.00	24. (7.00)
4	(China) QiXin Zhong	285.00	1. 100.00	2. 80.00	7. 43.00	24. 7.00	4. 55.00	( — )
5	(Russia) Dmitrii Timofeev	283.00	7. 43.00	16. 20.00	2. 80.00	1. 100.00	16. (20.00)	8. 40.00
6	(Iran) Reza Alipour	236.00	6. 47.00	23. (8.00)	8. 40.00	4. 55.00	5. 51.00	7. 43.00
7	(Russia) Sergey Rukin	234.00	4. 55.00	6. 47.00	16. 20.00	( — )	3. 65.00	6. 47.00
8	(Russia) Aleksandr Shikov	203.00	12. 28.00	14. 24.00	1. 100.00	( — )	( — )	5. 51.00
9	(Ukraine) Kostiantyn Pavlenko	181.00	22. 9.00	11. 31.00	19. 14.00	6. 47.00	2. 80.00	( — )
10	(Czech Republic) Jan Kriz	162.00	24. (7.00)	18. 16.00	3. 65.00	7. 43.00	18. 16.00	15. 22.00

=== Women ===
The results of the ten most successful athletes of the Speed World Cup 2019:

Rank	NAME	Points	Xiamen	Chamonix	Villars	Wujiang	Chongqing	Moscow
1	(China) Song Yiling	460.00	2. 80.00	1. 100.00	2. 80.00	16. (20.00)	1. 100.00	1. 100.00
2	(France) Anouck Jaubert	355.00	4. 55.00	16. (20.00)	1. 100.00	3. 65.00	4. 55.00	2. 80.00
3	(Indonesia) Aries Susanti Rahayu	333.00	1. 100.00	4. 55.00	19. (14.00)	2. 80.00	5. 51.00	6. 47.00
4	(Russia) Elizaveta Ivanova	261.00	29. (2.00)	2. 80.00	3. 65.00	12. 28.00	9. 37.00	5. 51.00
5	(China) Di Niu	201.00	7. 43.00	15. 22.00	4. 55.00	6. 47.00	10. 34.00	( — )
6	(Russia) Anna Tsyganova	197.00	( — )	( — )	6. 47.00	4. 55.00	8. 40.00	4. 55.00
7	(Poland) Aleksandra Kałucka	194.00	20. (12.00)	3. 65.00	15. 22.00	8. 40.00	14. 24.00	7. 43.00
8	(Poland) Patrycja Chudziak	188.00	( — )	7. 43.00	7. 43.00	5. 51.00	16. 20.00	11. 31.00
9	(Poland) Aleksandra Mirosław	180.00	( — )	( — )	( — )	1. 100.00	2. 80.00	( — )
10	(Russia) Iuliia Kaplina	172.00	18. 16.00	( — )	( — )	13. 26.00	3. 65.00	3. 65.00

=== National Teams ===
The results of the ten most successful countries of the Speed World Cup 2019:

Country names as used by the IFSC

Rank	Nation	Points	Xiamen	Chamonix	Villars	Wujiang	Chongqing	Moscow
1	(Russia) Russian Federation	1637	318	294	383	293	(292)	349
2	People's Republic of China	1375	343	268	263	209	292	(180)
3	France	1004	204	(113)	219	215	129	237
4	Indonesia	979	172	232	(46)	187	250	138
5	Poland	874	(59)	210	149	217	184	114
6	Ukraine	328	35	86	61	57	89	( — )
7	Iran	257	51	(8)	40	55	51	60
8	Italy	250	(0)	15	50	83	12	90
9	Ecuador	195	26	65	35	36	(22)	33
10	Czech Republic	162	(7)	16	65	43	16	22

== Combined ==
The 22 highest ranked climbers on the World Cup circuit (combined) who haven't already qualified for the Olympics will be invited to the Toulouse Olympic Qualifying Event.

=== Men ===
Rank	Name	Nation	Points
1	(Japan) Tomoa Narasaki	JPN	1728.0
2	(Czech Republic) Adam Ondra	CZE	2072.0
3	(Austria) Jakob Schubert	AUT	27720.0
4	(Japan) Kai Harada	JPN	34020.0
5	(Japan) Kokoro Fujii	JPN	84700.0
6	(Canada) Sean McColl	CAN	136800.0
7	(China) Pan Yufei	CHN	215040.0
8	(Germany) Jan Hojer	GER	447174.0
9	(United Kingdom) William Bosi	GBR	478224.0
10	(Switzerland) Sascha Lehmann	SUI	550800.0
11	(Japan) Meichi Narasaki	JPN	588000.0
12	(France) Manuel Cornu	FRA	590976.0
13	(Japan) Rei Sugimoto	JPN	894348.0
14	(Germany) Alexander Megos	GER	1018440.0
15	(Russia) Nikolai Yarilovets	RUS	1434672.0
16	(South Korea) Chon Jong-won	KOR	1441440.0
17	(Spain) Alberto Ginés López	ESP	1536732.0
18	(Japan) Keita Dohi	JPN	2192400.0
19	(France) Bassa Mawem	FRA	2475252.0
20	(Germany) Yannick Flohé	GER	2830464.0
21	(Indonesia) Alfian Muhammad	INA	2877370.0
22	(Italy) Stefano Ghisolfi	ITA	3201660.0
23	(Slovenia) Anže Peharc	SLO	3388027.5
24	(United States) Nathaniel Coleman	USA	3489882.0
25	(United States) Sean Bailey	USA	3516480.0
26	(Slovenia) Jernej Kruder	SLO	3845400.0
27	(Russia) Alexey Rubtsov	RUS	4433000.0
28	(China) Zhong Qixin	CHN	5457426.0
29	(Russia) Aleksandr Shikov	RUS	6776601.75
30	(France) Mickaël Mawem	FRA	8967024.0

=== Women ===
Rank	Name	Nation	Points
1	(Slovenia) Janja Garnbret	SLO	255.0
2	(Japan) Akiyo Noguchi	JPN	4104.0
3	(Austria) Jessica Pilz	AUT	14400.0
4	(Japan) Miho Nonaka	JPN	78400.0
5	(Slovenia) Lucka Rakovec	SLO	168000.0
6	(China) Zhang Yuetong	CHN	249600.0
7	(France) Fanny Gibert	FRA	310464.0
8	(South Korea) Jain Kim	KOR	325728.0
9	(France) Julia Chanourdie	FRA	380160.0
10	(Japan) Ai Mori	JPN	491400.0
11	(Slovenia) Mia Krampl	SLO	615384.0
12	(Japan) Futaba Ito	JPN	655200.0
13	(United Kingdom) Shauna Coxsey	GBR	910350.0
14	(Switzerland) Petra Klingler	SUI	1077375.0
15	(United States) Kyra Condie	USA	1296000.0
16	(France) Anouck Jaubert	FRA	1328040.0
17	(China) Song Yiling	CHN	1517092.5
18	(South Korea) Sa Sol	KOR	1756160.0
19	(United States) Ashima Shiraishi	USA	2275008.0
20	(Indonesia) Aries Susanti Rahayu	INA	2357178.0
21	(Ukraine) Ievgeniia Kazbekova	UKR	2698920.0
22	(Italy) Laura Rogora	ITA	3742200.0
23	(Canada) Alannah Yip	CAN	4572288.0
24	(Iran) Elnaz Rekabi	IRI	4665276.0
25	(Poland) Aleksandra Kalucka	POL	6573420.0
26	(United States) Margo Hayes	USA	8321670.0
27	(Austria) Sandra Lettner	AUT	8382528.0
28	(Slovenia) Vita Lukan	SLO	9080400.0
29	(Russia) Iuliia Kaplina	RUS	10432224.0
30	(Australia) Oceana Mackenzie	AUS	10795680.0

== Season podium table ==
Rank	Nation	Gold	Silver	Bronze	Total
1	Japan (JPN)	2	2	2	6
2	Slovenia (SLO)	2	1	0	3
3	Czech Republic (CZE)	1	2	0	3
4	France (FRA)	1	1	1	3
5	China (CHN)	1	0	0	1
5	South Korea (KOR)	1	0	0	1
7	Russia (RUS)	0	1	0	1
7	Spain (ESP)	0	1	0	1
9	Austria (AUT)	0	0	2	2
9	Indonesia (INA)	0	0	2	2
11	Canada (CAN)	0	0	1	1
Totals (11 entries)		8	8	8	24

== Medal table ==
Rank	Nation	Gold	Silver	Bronze	Total
1	Slovenia (SLO)	8	2	3	13
2	South Korea (KOR)	5	1	3	9
3	Japan (JPN)	4	12	7	23
4	China (CHN)	4	5	0	9
5	Czech Republic (CZE)	4	2	1	7
6	France (FRA)	3	3	3	9
7	Indonesia (INA)	3	1	1	5
8	Russia (RUS)	2	4	7	13
9	Austria (AUT)	1	1	4	6
10	Poland (POL)	1	1	1	3
11	Switzerland (SUI)	1	0	0	1
12	Germany (GER)	0	1	2	3
13	Great Britain (GBR)	0	1	1	2
13	Spain (ESP)	0	1	1	2
15	Ukraine (UKR)	0	1	0	1
16	Italy (ITA)	0	0	2	2
Totals (16 entries)		36	36	36	108

== See also ==
- 2019 in sport climbing
- 2019 IFSC Climbing World Championships
