= Sport climbing at the 2026 Asian Games – Women's boulder =

Women's boulder at the 2026 Asian Games
- Venue: Nagoya International Exhibition Hall Exhibition Hall 1
- Location: Nagoya, Aichi Prefecture, Japan
- Dates: 30 September – 1 October 2026
- Competitors: 14 from 8 nations

Medalists
gold medal	Zhang Yuetong	China
silver medal	Ai Mori	Japan
bronze medal	Seo Chae-hyun	South Korea

The women's competition bouldering event at the 2026 Asian Games took place from 30 September to 1 October 2026 at Nagoya International Exhibition Hall.

== Schedule ==
The schedule is as follows:

SF	Semi-finals	F	Final

Event↓/Date →	30th Wed	1st Fri
Women's boulder	SF	F

== Results ==
=== Final ===
The women's boulder final took place on 1 October 2026.

Rank	Athlete	Nation	Boulder				Total
Rank	Athlete	Nation	1	2	3	4	Total
1st place, gold medalist(s)	Zhang Yuetong	China	25	25	25	10	85.0
2nd place, silver medalist(s)	Ai Mori	Japan	25	25	24.8	10	84.8
3rd place, bronze medalist(s)	Seo Chae-hyun	South Korea	25	25	10	10	70.0
4	Luo Zhilu	China	25	25	10	10	70.0
5	Noh Hee-ju	South Korea	25	25	9.8	9.9	69.7
6	Miho Nonaka	Japan	25	25	0	10	60.0
7	Vanessa Teng	Singapore	24.9	9	10	9.9	53.8
8	Natalie Goh	Singapore	10	24.8	0	0	34.8

=== Semifinal ===
The women's boulder semifinals took place on 30 September 2026.

Rank	Athlete	Nation	Boulder				Total
Rank	Athlete	Nation	1	2	3	4	Total
1	Seo Chae-hyun	South Korea	25	25	25	25	100.0
2	Miho Nonaka	Japan	25	25	24.8	25	99.8
3	Zhang Yuetong	China	25	10	25	25	85.0
3	Luo Zhilu	China	25	10	25	25	85.0
5	Vanessa Teng	Singapore	25	9.9	24.9	25	84.8
6	Ai Mori	Japan	25	24.9	0	24.9	74.8
7	Noh Hee-ju	South Korea	25	10	24.8	10	69.8
8	Natalie Goh	Singapore	25	10	24.4	10	69.4
9	Sarina Ghaffari	Iran	25	9.9	24.3	10	69.2
10	Natcha Supavorased	Thailand	24.7	10	24.5	10	69.2
11	Wong Cheuk Kei	Hong Kong	25	9.9	0	10	44.9
12	Wong Hei Kiu	Hong Kong	10	0	9.2	9.9	29.1
13	Shareen Mohd Nasran	Malaysia	9.8	0	0	10	19.8
14	Annabel McGinnis	Thailand	10	0	0	0	10.0
