= Sport climbing at the 2026 Asian Games – Women's lead =

Women's lead at the 2026 Asian Games
- Venue: Portmesse Nagoya Exhibition Hall 1
- Location: Nagoya, Aichi Prefecture, Japan
- Dates: 2 – 3 October 2026
- Competitors: 14 from 8 nations

Medalists
| gold medal | Seo Chae-hyun | South Korea |
| silver medal | Ai Mori | Japan |
| bronze medal | Zhang Yuetong | China |

The women's competition lead climbing event at the 2026 Asian Games took place from 2 to 3 October 2026 at Portmesse Nagoya Exhibition Hall 1.

== Schedule ==
The schedule is as follows:

| SF | Semifinals | F | Final |

| Event↓/Date → | 2 Oct Fri | 3 Oct Sat |
|---|---|---|
| Women's lead | SF | F |

== Results ==
=== Final ===
The women's lead final took place on 3 October 2026.

| Rank | Athlete | Score |
|---|---|---|
| 1st place, gold medalist(s) | Seo Chae-hyun (KOR) | TOP |
| 2nd place, silver medalist(s) | Ai Mori (JPN) | 47+ |
| 3rd place, bronze medalist(s) | Zhang Yuetong (CHN) | 39+ |
| 4 | Kim Chae-yeong (KOR) | 38+ |
| 5 | Alma Ariella Tsany (INA) | 35+ |
| 6 | Luo Zhilu (CHN) | 35 |
| 7 | Mei Kotake (JPN) | 34 |
| 8 | Sukma Lintang Cahyani (INA) | 28+ |

=== Semi-finals ===
The women's lead semi-finals took place on 2 October 2026.

| Rank | Athlete | Score |
|---|---|---|
| 1 | Seo Chae-hyun (KOR) | TOP |
| 2 | Ai Mori (JPN) | TOP |
| 3 | Kim Chae-yeong (KOR) | 52 |
| 4 | Zhang Yuetong (CHN) | 51 |
| 5 | Mei Kotake (JPN) | 49 |
| 6 | Alma Ariella Tsany (INA) | 39+ |
| 6 | Sukma Lintang Cahyani (INA) | 39+ |
| 8 | Luo Zhilu (CHN) | 38+ |
| 9 | Natcha Supavorased (THA) | 27+ |
| 10 | Leung Sze Lai (HKG) | 25+ |
| 11 | Lynnette Koh (SGP) | 25 |
| 11 | Shareen Nasran (MAS) | 25 |
| 11 | Wong Cheuk Kei (HKG) | 25 |
| 14 | Vanessa Teng (SGP) | 23 |
