= Sport climbing at the 2026 Asian Games – Men's lead =

Men's lead at the 2026 Asian Games
- Venue: Portmesse Nagoya Exhibition Hall 1
- Location: Nagoya, Aichi Prefecture, Japan
- Dates: 2 – 3 October 2026
- Competitors: 15 from 8 nations

Medalists
gold medal	Neo Suzuki	Japan
silver medal	Satone Yoshida	Japan
bronze medal	Lee Do-hyun	South Korea

The men's competition lead climbing event at the 2026 Asian Games took place from 2 to 3 October 2026 at Portmesse Nagoya Exhibition Hall 1.

== Schedule ==
The schedule is as follows:

SF	Semifinals	F	Final

Event↓/Date →	2 Oct Fri	3 Oct Sat
Men's lead	SF	F

== Results ==
=== Final ===
The men's lead final took place on 3 October 2026.

Rank	Athlete	Score
1st place, gold medalist(s)	Neo Suzuki (JPN)	40+
2nd place, silver medalist(s)	Satone Yoshida (JPN)	38+
3rd place, bronze medalist(s)	Lee Do-hyun (KOR)	38
4	Pan Yufei (CHN)	38
5	Putra Tri Ramadani (INA)	32+
6	Hu Junzhe (CHN)	28+
7	Noh Hyun-seung (KOR)	26+
8	Raviandi Ramadhan (INA)	23+
9	Auswin Aueareechit (THA)	21+

=== Semi-finals ===
The men's lead semi-finals took place on 2 October 2026.

Rank	Athlete	Score
1	Neo Suzuki (JPN)	43
2	Satone Yoshida (JPN)	39+
3	Putra Tri Ramadani (INA)	36
4	Lee Do-hyun (KOR)	33+
5	Noh Hyun-seung (KOR)	31
6	Hu Junzhe (CHN)	28
7	Pan Yufei (CHN)	23
7	Auswin Aueareechit (THA)	23
7	Raviandi Ramadhan (INA)	23
10	Chan Cheung-chi (HKG)	22+
11	Gerald Bayo Verosil (SGP)	20+
12	Chan Zhi Tao (HKG)	19+
13	Luke Goh (SGP)	18+
14	Ke Qun Tao (MAS)	18
15	Teeraphon Boondech (THA)	17+
