= Sport climbing at the 2026 Asian Games – Men's boulder =

Men's boulder at the 2026 Asian Games
- Venue: Nagoya International Exhibition Hall Exhibition Hall 1
- Location: Nagoya, Aichi Prefecture, Japan
- Dates: 29 – 30 September 2026
- Competitors: 15 from 8 nations

Medalists
gold medal	Sorato Anraku	Japan
silver medal	Lee Do-hyun	South Korea
bronze medal	Tomoa Narasaki	Japan

The men's competition bouldering event at the 2026 Asian Games took place from 29 to 30 September 2026 at Nagoya International Exhibition Hall.

== Schedule ==
The schedule is as follows:

SF	Semifinals	F	Final

Event↓/Date →	29th Tue	30th Wed
Men's boulder	SF	F

== Results ==
=== Final ===
The men's boulder final took place on 30 September 2026.

Rank	Athlete	Nation	Boulder				Total
Rank	Athlete	Nation	1	2	3	4	Total
1st place, gold medalist(s)	Sorato Anraku	Japan	25	24.8	24.7	0	74.5
2nd place, silver medalist(s)	Lee Do-hyun	South Korea	0	24.9	24.8	0	49.7
3rd place, bronze medalist(s)	Tomoa Narasaki	Japan	24.9	10	10	0	44.9
4	Pan Yufei	China	10	10	10	0	30.0
5	Chon Jong-won	South Korea	10	10	10	0	30.0
6	Hu Junzhe	China	9.9	10	9.8	0	29.7
7	Auswin Aueareechit	Thailand	0	10	10	0	20.0
8	Gerald Bayo Verosil	Singapore	0	0	10	0	10.0

=== Semifinal ===
The men's boulder semifinals took place on 29 September 2026.

Rank	Athlete	Nation	Boulder				Total
Rank	Athlete	Nation	1	2	3	4	Total
1	Lee Do-hyun	South Korea	24.9	25	24.8	25	99.7
2	Sorato Anraku	Japan	25	25	24.7	24.6	99.3
3	Pan Yufei	China	24.9	25	9.2	25	84.1
4	Auswin Aueareechit	Thailand	25	24.6	9.5	24.8	83.9
5	Tomoa Narasaki	Japan	24.4	9.8	24.7	24.9	83.8
6	Chon Jong-won	South Korea	0	25	24.9	24.8	74.7
7	Hu Junzhe	China	9.9	0	24.6	25	59.5
8	Gerald Bayo Verosil	Singapore	0	0	23.9	24.7	48.6
9	Raviandi Ramadhan	Indonesia	0	9.9	10	24.8	44.7
10	Chan Cheung-chi	Hong Kong	10	0	9.6	24.8	44.4
11	Luke Goh	Singapore	0	9.7	0	25	34.7
12	Ravianto Ramadhan	Indonesia	0	10	0	24.6	34.6
13	Chan Zhi Tao	Hong Kong	0	0	0	24.8	24.8
14	Ke Qun Tao	Malaysia	0	0	0	24.7	24.7
15	Teeraphon Boondech	Thailand	0	0	9.4	9.8	19.2
