= Lauren Mukheibir =

South African climber

Personal information
- Born: October 8, 2001 (age 24) Sandton, South Africa
- Education: Edith Cowan University (BS)
- Height: 1.60 m (5 ft 3 in)

Climbing career
- Type of climber: Competition climbing; Bouldering; Sport climbing
- Known for: IFSC African Champion in 2021 (boulder, lead, and speed); IFSC African Champion in 2023 (combined boulder and lead)

Lauren Mukheibir (born October 8, 2001) is a South African rock climber who specializes in competition climbing. As of 2024, Mukheibir is the reigning female African Champion in the women's combined bouldering-and-lead category, and she represented South Africa in that category at the 2024 Summer Olympics.

== Climbing career ==
Mukheibir was born in Sandton, South Africa, grew up in Bryanston, and began rock climbing when she was nine years old.

In 2021, Mukheibir became the African women's continental champion in boulder, lead, and speed climbing when she won first place at the IFSC Africa Continental Championships. At the 2022 World Games in Birmingham, Alabama, Mukheibir placed 12th in the lead and speed categories and 11th in the bouldering category. Mukheibir moved to Perth, Australia for her studies in 2023 where she trained for the African Olympic qualifiers with the help of South African coach Devin Sender and Australian coach Alan Pryce. She also participated in the Innsbruck stage of the 2024 IFSC Climbing World Cup in June 2024.

Mukheibir won the women's combined category at the IFSC African Sport Climbing Olympic Qualifier in Pretoria in December 2023, qualifying her for the 2024 Summer Olympics in Paris. She was the only female climber at the Qualifier to top the second problem in the boulder phase. She was one of four sport climbers representing South Africa at the 2024 Summer Olympics, where she competed in the 'women's competition bouldering-and-competition lead climbing combined' event.

== Personal life ==
Mukheibir graduated cum laude from Edith Cowan University in Perth, Australia with a degree in marine biology. She decided to study marine biology after volunteering in the Seychelles for a scuba diving programme in 2020.
