= Sport climbing at the 2022 Asian Games – Men's combined =

Men's combined at the 2022 Asian Games
- Venue: Keqiao Yangshan Sport Climbing Centre
- Date: 5–6 October 2023
- Competitors: 26 from 14 nations

Medalists
gold medal	Sorato Anraku	Japan
silver medal	Lee Do-hyun	South Korea
bronze medal	Pan Yufei	China

The men's competition combined climbing event at the 2022 Asian Games took place from 5 to 6 October 2023 at Keqiao Yangshan Sport Climbing Centre.

== Schedule ==
All times are China Standard Time (UTC+08:00)

Date	Time	Event
Thursday, 5 October 2023	09:00	Qualification – Boulder
Thursday, 5 October 2023	13:50	Qualification – Lead
Friday, 6 October 2023	09:00	Semifinal – Boulder
Friday, 6 October 2023	13:20	Semifinal – Lead
Friday, 6 October 2023	18:35	Final – Boulder
Friday, 6 October 2023	20:28	Final – Lead

== Results ==
Legend

- T — Top hold
- z — First zone hold
- Z — Second zone hold

=== Qualification ===
Rank	Athlete	Boulder					Lead		Total
Rank	Athlete	1	2	3	4	Points	Result	Points	Total
1	Lee Do-hyun (KOR)	T1	T1	T1	T1	100	Top	100	200.0
2	Sorato Anraku (JPN)	T1	T2	T1	T1	99.9	Top	100	199.9
3	Pan Yufei (CHN)	T1	T1	T1	T1	100	44+	92.1	192.1
4	Meichi Narasaki (JPN)	T1	T1	T1	T1	100	42+	84.1	184.1
5	Chon Jong-won (KOR)	T1	T1	T1	T2	99.9	37+	64.1	164.0
6	Shoji Chan (HKG)	T3	T1	T1	T2	99.7	34+	54.1	153.8
7	Huang Jinbin (CHN)	z2	T1	T3	T2	79.6	32+	48.1	127.7
8	Aman Verma (IND)	z1	T1	T3	Z1	64.8	34	54	118.8
9	Luke Goh (SGP)	Z2	T2	T3	Z2	69.5	31+	45.1	114.6
10	Dennis Chua (SGP)	Z1	T1	T1	Z2	69.9	26	30	99.9
11	Ho Cheuk Hei (HKG)	Z3	T3	T1	Z3	69.4	26	30	99.4
12	Teeraphon Boondech (THA)	Z7	T2	T1	Z2	69.2	26	30	99.2
13	Bharath Pereira (IND)	Z4	T1	T1	Z1	69.7	25+	28.1	97.8
14	Rizky Simatupang (INA)		T1	T9	Z6	58.7	26	30	88.7
15	Alexey Panfilov (KAZ)	z4	T3	Z2	Z5	49	26	30	79.0
16	Artyom Devyaterikov (KAZ)	z9	z1	T4	Z8	43.2	25+	28.1	71.3
17	Winai Ruangrit (THA)	z2	T2	Z1	z3	44.6	18	14	58.6
18	Musauwir (INA)	z2	T4		Z5	39.2	15+	9.1	48.3
19	Iman Mora (PHI)	z6	Z6	z3	z4	23.5	19	16	39.5
20	John Joseph Veloria (PHI)	Z4				9.7	22+	22.1	31.8
21	Artyom Baranov (UZB)		z5		z10	8.7	20+	18.1	26.8
22	Nasser Abuergeeb (KUW)		Z4			9.7	16	10	19.7
23	Zaheer Ahmad (PAK)		z3			4.8	13+	7.1	11.9
24	Chuluunbaataryn Mandakhbayar (MGL)					0	13+	7.1	7.1
25	Sükhbaataryn Itgel (MGL)					0	13	7	7.0
26	Fazal Wadood (PAK)					0	9	3	3.0

=== Semifinal ===
Rank	Athlete	Boulder					Lead		Total
Rank	Athlete	1	2	3	4	Points	Result	Points	Total
1	Sorato Anraku (JPN)	T3	Z2	T1	T1	84.7	Top	100	184.7
2	Lee Do-hyun (KOR)	T2	Z6	T1	Z2	69.3	39	72	141.3
3	Meichi Narasaki (JPN)	T1	z7	T1	T1	79.4	34	54	133.4
4	Chon Jong-won (KOR)	T4	Z2	T1	T3	84.4	30+	42.1	126.5
5	Pan Yufei (CHN)	T2	Z3	Z2	z1	49.6	36+	60.1	109.7
6	Huang Jinbin (CHN)	T3	Z5	z2	Z7	48.7	27	33	81.7
7	Rizky Simatupang (INA)	z2		z1	z1	14.9	34	54	68.9
8	Shoji Chan (HKG)	T3	Z2	z1	z1	44.7	23	24	68.7
9	Bharath Pereira (IND)	T4	z1	z3	Z7	43.9	19	16	59.9
10	Aman Verma (IND)	Z9		z1	Z4	23.9	28	36	59.9
11	Ho Cheuk Hei (HKG)	Z1	Z4	z5	z1	29.3	24	26	55.3
12	Teeraphon Boondech (THA)	z3	Z2	z1	z1	24.7	24+	26.1	50.8
13	Luke Goh (SGP)	Z2		z2	Z3	24.6	24+	26.1	50.7
14	Musauwir (INA)	z2		z2	z2	14.7	27	33	47.7
15	Alexey Panfilov (KAZ)	z6		z2	z1	14.4	25	28	42.4
16	Artyom Devyaterikov (KAZ)	Z3	z4	z2	z1	24.4	19	16	40.4
17	John Joseph Veloria (PHI)	Z4	z2		z2	19.5	14	8	27.5
18	Dennis Chua (SGP)	z1		z1	z2	14.9	17	12	26.9
19	Winai Ruangrit (THA)	z2		z1	z1	14.9	16+	10.1	25.0
20	Iman Mora (PHI)	z8			z2	9.2	14+	8.1	17.3

=== Final ===
Rank	Athlete	Boulder					Lead		Total
Rank	Athlete	1	2	3	4	Points	Result	Points	Total
1st place, gold medalist(s)	Sorato Anraku (JPN)	T1	T2	T3	T1	99.7	41+	88.1	187.8
2nd place, silver medalist(s)	Lee Do-hyun (KOR)	T2	Z3	z2	T1	64.6	32+	54.1	118.7
3rd place, bronze medalist(s)	Pan Yufei (CHN)	z1	T4	z2	T1	59.6	23	28	87.6
4	Chon Jong-won (KOR)	T2	Z3	Z2	T1	69.6	17	16	85.6
5	Meichi Narasaki (JPN)	T2	T6		T1	74.4	13	9	83.4
6	Huang Jinbin (CHN)	T3		z3	Z1	39.6	12+	8.1	47.7
7	Shoji Chan (HKG)	z1	Z5		T4	39.3	12+	8.1	47.4
8	Rizky Simatupang (INA)	z5	z4		Z2	19.2	9	5	24.2
