= Sport climbing at the 2022 Asian Games – Women's combined =

Women's combined at the 2022 Asian Games
- Venue: Keqiao Yangshan Sport Climbing Centre
- Date: 5–7 October 2023
- Competitors: 23 from 14 nations

Medalists
| gold medal | Ai Mori | Japan |
| silver medal | Seo Chae-hyun | South Korea |
| bronze medal | Zhang Yuetong | China |

The women's competition combined climbing event at the 2022 Asian Games took place from 5 to 7 October 2023 at the Keqiao Yangshan Sport Climbing Centre.

The final events were canceled due to severe weather conditions, with medals awarded based on the semifinal results. Since Ai Mori tied with Seo Chae-hyun in the semifinals, gold and silver were decided on count-back to qualification.

== Schedule ==
All times are China Standard Time (UTC+08:00)

| Date | Time | Event |
|---|---|---|
| Thursday, 5 October 2023 | 09:00 | Qualification – Boulder |
| Thursday, 5 October 2023 | 13:50 | Qualification – Lead |
| Saturday, 7 October 2023 | 09:00 | Semifinal – Boulder |
| Saturday, 7 October 2023 | 13:20 | Semifinal – Lead |
| Saturday, 7 October 2023 | 18:35 | Final – Boulder |
| Saturday, 7 October 2023 | 20:30 | Final – Lead |

== Results ==
Legend

- T — Top hold
- z — First zone hold
- Z — Second zone hold

=== Qualification ===
| Rank | Athlete | Boulder | | | | | Lead | | Total |
| Rank | Athlete | 1 | 2 | 3 | 4 | Points | Result | Points | Total |
|---|---|---|---|---|---|---|---|---|---|
| 1 | Ai Mori (JPN) | T1 | T2 | T1 | T1 | 99.9 | 43+ | 96.1 | 196.0 |
| 2 | Seo Chae-hyun (KOR) | T1 | z1 | T2 | T1 | 79.9 | 43+ | 96.1 | 176.0 |
| 3 | Luo Zhilu (CHN) | T1 | T3 | T2 | T1 | 99.7 | 38+ | 76.1 | 175.8 |
| 4 | Sa Sol (KOR) | T1 | z3 | T3 | T1 | 79.6 | 27 | 39 | 118.6 |
| 5 | Anon Matsufuji (JPN) | T1 | Z3 | T1 | T1 | 84.8 | 23+ | 28.1 | 112.9 |
| 6 | Zhang Yuetong (CHN) | T1 | z3 | z1 | T1 | 59.8 | 31 | 51 | 110.8 |
| 7 | Elnaz Rekabi (IRI) | T1 | z1 | Z1 | T1 | 65 | 29+ | 45.1 | 110.1 |
| 8 | Lee Hung-ying (TPE) | T1 | z2 | Z1 | T1 | 64.9 | 23+ | 28.1 | 93.0 |
| 8 | Margarita Agambayeva (KAZ) | T1 | z2 | Z1 | T1 | 64.9 | 23+ | 28.1 | 93.0 |
| 10 | Sukma Lintang Cahyani (INA) | T1 | z1 | z6 | T3 | 59.3 | 14+ | 10.1 | 69.4 |
| 11 | Puntarika Tunyavanich (THA) | T1 | z1 | z1 | T1 | 60 | 11+ | 7.1 | 67.1 |
| 12 | Wong Tseng Shun (HKG) | T1 | z1 | z2 | T1 | 59.9 | 11+ | 7.1 | 67.0 |
| 13 | Tsui Tsz Kiu (HKG) | T1 | z1 | z1 | T4 | 59.7 | 11+ | 7.1 | 66.8 |
| 14 | Nur Diatul Jannah (INA) | T1 | z1 | z5 | T1 | 59.6 | 11+ | 7.1 | 66.7 |
| 15 | Rochelle Suarez (PHI) | T3 | z2 | | T4 | 54.4 | 11+ | 7.1 | 61.5 |
| 16 | Viktoriya Adamenko (KAZ) | T1 | z5 | z2 | Z1 | 44.5 | 11+ | 7.1 | 51.6 |
| 17 | Saniya Farooque Shaikh (IND) | T3 | z1 | z5 | Z2 | 44.3 | 11+ | 7.1 | 51.4 |
| 18 | Shivani Charak (IND) | T2 | z1 | | Z2 | 39.8 | 10+ | 6.1 | 45.9 |
| 19 | Nyamdoogiin Selenge (MGL) | T2 | | z12 | Z13 | 37.6 | 9 | 5 | 42.6 |
| 20 | Mhik Tejares (PHI) | T2 | | | Z2 | 34.8 | 10+ | 6.1 | 40.9 |
| 21 | Asal Islamova (UZB) | Z1 | z3 | z2 | Z1 | 29.7 | 10+ | 6.1 | 35.8 |
| 22 | Iroda Rapikova (UZB) | Z8 | | | | 9.3 | 9 | 5 | 14.3 |
| 23 | Amani Jannat (PAK) | z1 | | | | 5 | 9 | 5 | 10.0 |

=== Semifinal ===
| Rank | Athlete | Boulder | | | | Lead | | Total |
| Rank | Athlete | 2 | 3 | 4 | Points | Result | Points | Total |
|---|---|---|---|---|---|---|---|---|
| 1 | Ai Mori (JPN) | T1 | T3 | T1 | 99.73 | Top | 100 | 199.73 |
| 2 | Seo Chae-hyun (KOR) | T1 | T2 | T2 | 99.73 | Top | 100 | 199.73 |
| 3 | Zhang Yuetong (CHN) | T2 | T1 | T2 | 99.73 | 42 | 76 | 175.73 |
| 4 | Anon Matsufuji (JPN) | T1 | Z1 | Z2 | 59.86 | 39+ | 64.1 | 123.96 |
| 5 | Sa Sol (KOR) | T2 | Z3 | Z2 | 59.46 | 39 | 64 | 123.46 |
| 6 | Luo Zhilu (CHN) | T2 | z1 | Z1 | 53.20 | 36+ | 54.1 | 107.3 |
| 7 | Elnaz Rekabi (IRI) | T1 | z2 | Z4 | 52.80 | 32+ | 42.1 | 94.9 |
| 8 | Margarita Agambayeva (KAZ) | T2 | z3 | Z1 | 52.93 | 27 | 28 | 80.93 |
| 9 | Lee Hung-ying (TPE) | T5 | z1 | Z3 | 52.53 | 25 | 24 | 76.53 |
| 10 | Sukma Lintang Cahyani (INA) | Z4 | | z2 | 19.46 | 25 | 24 | 43.46 |
| 11 | Wong Tseng Shun (HKG) | Z7 | | z2 | 19.06 | 23+ | 20.1 | 39.16 |
| 12 | Nur Diatul Jannah (INA) | | | z3 | 6.40 | 25 | 24 | 30.40 |
| 13 | Puntarika Tunyavanich (THA) | z4 | | z3 | 12.66 | 20+ | 14.1 | 26.76 |
| 14 | Saniya Farooque Shaikh (IND) | z8 | | z2 | 12.26 | 17 | 9 | 21.26 |
| 15 | Shivani Charak (IND) | z9 | | z2 | 12.13 | 16+ | 8.1 | 20.23 |
| 16 | Tsui Tsz Kiu (HKG) | z1 | | z3 | 13.06 | 15 | 7 | 20.06 |
| 17 | Viktoriya Adamenko (KAZ) | z6 | | z3 | 12.40 | 10+ | 2.1 | 14.5 |
| 18 | Rochelle Suarez (PHI) | z3 | | | 6.40 | 10+ | 2.1 | 8.5 |
| 19 | Mhik Tejares (PHI) | z5 | | | 6.13 | 10+ | 2.1 | 8.23 |
| 20 | Nyamdoogiin Selenge (MGL) | z7 | | | 5.86 | 5 | 0 | 5.86 |

- The first boulder was cancelled due to rain, therefore the stage score for each boulder was multiplied by a factor of 4/3.

=== Final ===
| Rank | Athlete | Boulder | | | | | Lead | | Total |
| Rank | Athlete | 1 | 2 | 3 | 4 | Points | Result | Points | Total |
|---|---|---|---|---|---|---|---|---|---|
| 1st place, gold medalist(s) | Ai Mori (JPN) | | | | | | | | |
| 2nd place, silver medalist(s) | Seo Chae-hyun (KOR) | | | | | | | | |
| 3rd place, bronze medalist(s) | Zhang Yuetong (CHN) | | | | | | | | |
| 4 | Anon Matsufuji (JPN) | | | | | | | | |
| 5 | Sa Sol (KOR) | | | | | | | | |
| 6 | Luo Zhilu (CHN) | | | | | | | | |
| 7 | Elnaz Rekabi (IRI) | | | | | | | | |
| 8 | Margarita Agambayeva (KAZ) | | | | | | | | |

- The final was cancelled over safety issues due to the heavy rain in Shaoxing, the organizing committee announced that the semifinal results would be considered as the final results.
