= Ai Mori =

Japanese rock climber (born 2003)

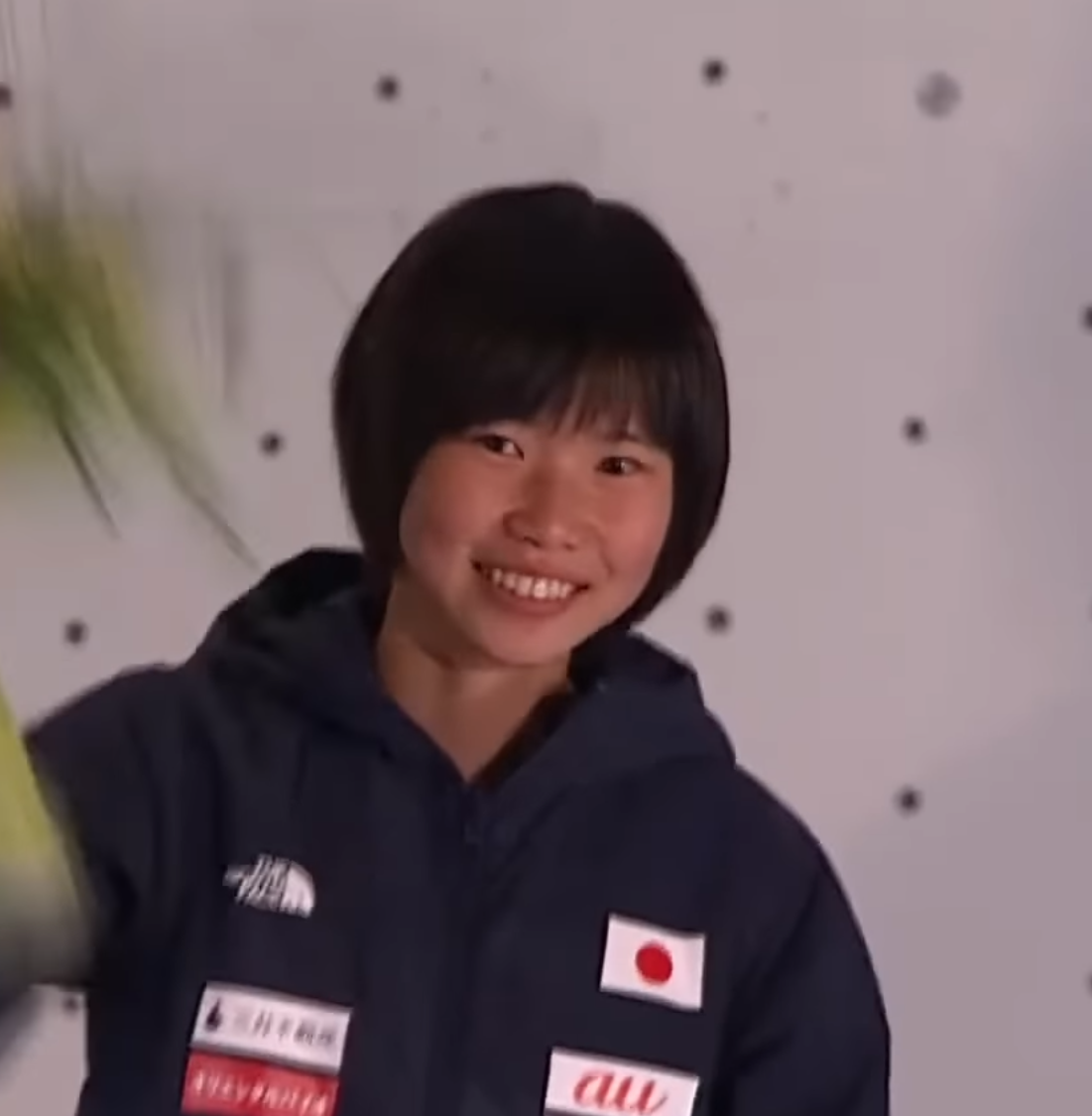
- Ai Mori at the Koper 2022 Lead World Cup

Personal information
- Nationality: Japan
- Born: 17 September 2003 (age 23) Ibaraki, Japan
- Occupation: Professional rock climber
- Height: 154 cm (5 ft 1 in)

Climbing career
- Type of climber: Competition climbing; Bouldering; Sport climbing
- Highest grade: Redpoint: 8c (5.14b); Bouldering: V13/14
- Known for: First Japanese climber to win the gold in a World Championships for lead climbing.
Medal record
Women's competition climbing
Representing Japan
Event / 1st / 2nd / 3rd; World Cup / 5 / 4 / 3
World Championships
Gold medal – first place	2023 Bern	Lead
Bronze medal – third place	2019 Hachiōji	Lead
Bronze medal – third place	2023 Bern	Combined
World Cup (Overall)
Third place	2024	Lead
Asian Championships
Gold medal – first place	2026	Bouldering
Gold medal – first place	2026	Lead
Asian Games
Gold medal – first place	2022 Hangzhou	Combined
Silver medal – second place	2026 Aichi–Nagoya	Boulder
Silver medal – second place	2026 Aichi–Nagoya	Lead

Ai Mori (森 秋彩, Mori Ai; born 17 September 2003) is a Japanese professional rock climber who specializes in competition lead climbing and competition bouldering.

At the 2019 IFSC Climbing World Championships, Mori became the youngest Japanese athlete to finish in a podium place in the competition, third in lead. She has won Japan Cup titles in both bouldering and lead disciplines and has multiple IFSC Climbing World Cup podium finishes, including three gold medals in World Cup events in the 2022 season. At the 2023 IFSC Climbing World Championships, Mori won the gold medal in lead, becoming the first Japanese athlete to win a World Championships lead title.

== Climbing career ==
In 2016, Mori won Lead Japan Cup, becoming the youngest winner of the competition at age 12. She has repeated as the national lead champion in 2018, 2020, 2021, and 2022. Mori also won the Boulder Japan Cup in 2021 and finished second place in 2018.

Mori made her senior international competition climbing debut in 2019, winning two bronze medals in lead and one in bouldering World Cups. Later that year, at age 15, she placed third in the lead category at the IFSC Climbing World Championships, becoming the youngest Japanese climber to medal at the World Championship. Akiyo Noguchi had held the previous record with her 2005 bronze medal in lead at age 16. In November and December 2019, Mori finished fifth in the combined category at the Olympic qualifying event in Toulouse, France. However, Japan had already filled its athlete quota for the 2020 Olympic Games, so Mori did not compete at the Games despite finishing in qualifying places.

In September 2022, Mori took first place at the World Cup event in Koper, Slovenia, finishing ahead of second-place finisher Janja Garnbret, who had won all four lead World Cups of the season coming into Koper. Mori was competing in her first World Cup event of the year, and her first international event of any kind since the 2020 Olympic qualifying event in 2019. She followed this up with first-place finishes in another two World Cups events, at the lead event in Edinburgh, Scotland, and the season-ending combined boulder and lead event in Morioka, Japan.

In 2023, Mori competed in the 2023 IFSC Climbing World Championships and became the world champion in lead, becoming the first Japanese athlete to win a world title in the discipline. She also qualified for the 2024 Olympics by placing third in the combined event at the World Championships.

In 2024, Mori finished in fourth place in the combined event at the Olympics, expressing frustration for not being able to top the final route as previously promised to fellow climber Akiyo Noguchi. UK Climbing noted that the dynamic boulders didn't suit her style, but she tapped the top hold of the lead climb, receiving the highest score. On 6 October, she won the silver medal at the last event of the 2024 IFSC Climbing World Cup, bringing her to third place in the year's ranking.

== Climbing style ==
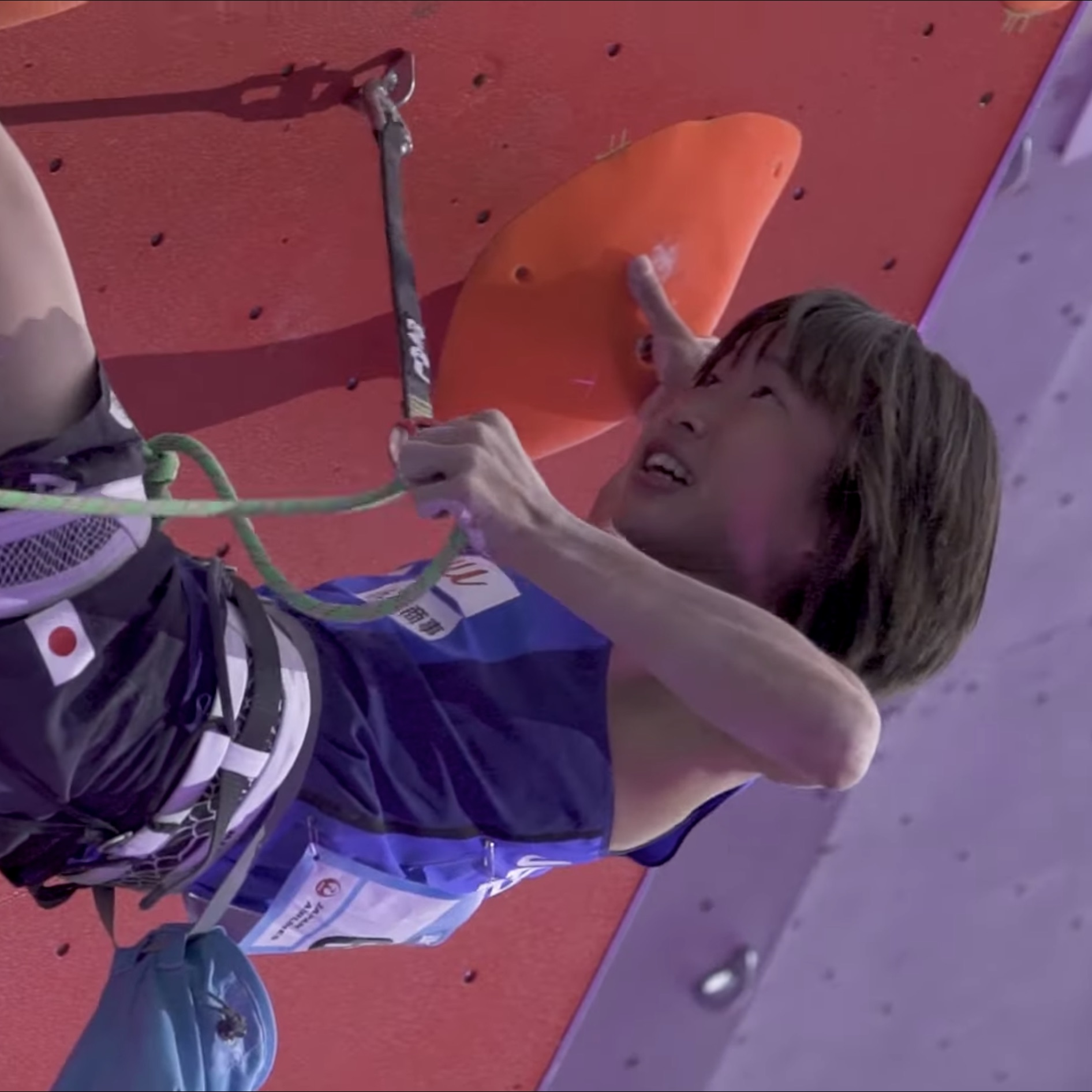
Mori lead climbing in 2019

Mori is known for her strong performances in lead climbing. She excels in endurance based routes where her static climbing style plays a crucial role, but occasionally struggles with dynamic moves. During boulder competition Mori has been praised by commentators for her "incredible footwork". She trains four times a week at two indoor gyms in Tsukuba.

Mori has stated in 2022 that she prefers climbing outside of competitions: "I always like pushing myself to my limits, I can only do that in training. In comps if you make a mistake, your ranking changes dramatically. I don't want to feel pressure at every move. I like climbing freely." In a 2023 interview she explained how she learned to enjoy competitions after taking a break from them, and that she plans on competing for a maximum of 10 years.

== Personal life ==
As of 2023, Mori was a student at the University of Tsukuba and living with her parents, planning to live alone in the future. She has a younger brother and is a fan of the Japanese pop band Sekai no Owari.

== Rankings ==
=== World Cup ===
	2019	2022	2023	2024	2025
Lead	6	11	4	3	27
Bouldering	20	-	20	26	49
Speed	-	-	-	-	-
Combined	10	1	-	-	-

=== World Championships ===
Discipline
Discipline	2019	2023
Lead	3	1
Bouldering	31	6
Speed	60	-
Combined	6	3

=== World Youth Championships ===
Discipline
Discipline	2017 Youth B	2018 Youth B
Lead	1	-
Bouldering	7	20
Speed	43	44
Combined	2	-

=== Asian Youth Championships ===
	2017 Youth B	2018 Youth B
Lead	1	2
Bouldering	3	4
Speed	5	20

=== Japan Cup ===
	2014	2015	2016	2017	2018	2019	2020	2021	2022	2023	2024	2025	2026
Lead	12	2	1	1	-	2	1	1	1	1	1	1	1
Bouldering	-	-	11	4	2	7	4	1	4	4	5	7	5
Speed	-	-	-	-	-	11	-	-	-	-	-	-	-
Combined	-	-	-	-	-	3	8	-	1	1	-	-	-

== World Cup podiums ==
=== Lead ===
Season	Gold	Silver	Bronze	Total
2019			1	1
2022	2			2
2023	1	2		3
2024	1	2		3
2025			1	1
Total	4	4	2	10

=== Bouldering ===
Season	Gold	Silver	Bronze	Total
2019			1	1
Total			1	1

=== Combined (Boulder & Lead) ===
Season	Gold	Silver	Bronze	Total
2022	1			1
Total	1			1
