= Sport climbing at the 2022 Asian Games – Men's speed =

Men's speed at the 2022 Asian Games
- Venue: Keqiao Yangshan Sport Climbing Centre
- Date: 3 October 2023
- Competitors: 25 from 15 nations

Medalists
| gold medal | Reza Alipour | Iran |
| silver medal | Long Jinbao | China |
| bronze medal | Veddriq Leonardo | Indonesia |

The men's competition speed climbing event at the 2022 Asian Games took place on 3 October 2023 at Keqiao Yangshan Sport Climbing Centre, Shaoxing, China.

== Schedule ==
All times are China Standard Time (UTC+08:00)

| Date | Time | Event |
|---|---|---|
| Tuesday, 3 October 2023 | 12:10 | Qualification |
| Tuesday, 3 October 2023 | 20:13 | 1/8 finals |
| Tuesday, 3 October 2023 | 20:34 | Quarterfinals |
| Tuesday, 3 October 2023 | 20:49 | Semifinals |
| Tuesday, 3 October 2023 | 20:57 | Finals |

== Results ==
Legend

- FS — False start

=== Qualification ===
| Rank | Athlete | Lane A | Lane B | Best |
|---|---|---|---|---|
| 1 | Veddriq Leonardo (INA) | 4.978 | 6.925 | 4.978 |
| 2 | Wu Peng (CHN) | 5.183 | 5.151 | 5.151 |
| 3 | Kiromal Katibin (INA) | 7.315 | 5.161 | 5.161 |
| 4 | Reza Alipour (IRI) | 5.520 | 5.184 | 5.184 |
| 5 | Lee Seung-beom (KOR) | 5.351 | 5.489 | 5.351 |
| 6 | Long Jinbao (CHN) | 5.353 | 5.794 | 5.353 |
| 7 | Ryo Omasa (JPN) | 5.475 | 5.355 | 5.355 |
| 8 | Amir Maimuratov (KAZ) | 5.447 | 6.671 | 5.447 |
| 9 | Rishat Khaibullin (KAZ) | 6.348 | 5.454 | 5.454 |
| 10 | Aphiwit Limpanichpakdee (THA) | 5.629 | 6.683 | 5.629 |
| 11 | Milad Alipour (IRI) | 5.637 | 6.512 | 5.637 |
| 12 | Lee Yong-su (KOR) | 5.751 | 5.650 | 5.650 |
| 13 | Wong Cheuk Nam (HKG) | 5.790 | 7.021 | 5.790 |
| 14 | Lin Chia-hsiang (TPE) | 6.114 | 6.109 | 6.109 |
| 15 | Shoji Chan (HKG) | 6.129 | 6.965 | 6.129 |
| 16 | Aman Verma (IND) | 7.110 | 6.205 | 6.205 |
| 17 | Sirapob Jirajaturapak (THA) | Fall | 6.667 | 6.667 |
| 18 | Tan Bing Qian (SGP) | 9.100 | 6.767 | 6.767 |
| 19 | Mark Rogalev (UZB) | 6.975 | 8.377 | 6.975 |
| 20 | Dhiraj Dinkar Birajdar (IND) | 8.037 | 7.313 | 7.313 |
| 21 | Zaheer Ahmad (PAK) | 7.717 | 7.801 | 7.717 |
| 22 | Mir Abuzar Faiz (PAK) | 8.398 | 9.553 | 8.398 |
| 23 | Nasser Abuergeeb (KUW) | 8.474 | Fall | 8.474 |
| 24 | Sükhbaataryn Itgel (MGL) | 11.403 | 11.469 | 11.403 |
| 25 | Battulgyn Bilgüün (MGL) | Fall | 12.262 | 12.262 |

=== Knockout round ===
1/8 finals
1 | Veddriq Leonardo (INA) | 7.452
16 | Aman Verma (IND) | 7.620
8 | Amir Maimuratov (KAZ) | 5.176
9 | Rishat Khaibullin (KAZ) | 5.622
4 | Reza Alipour (IRI) | 5.280
13 | Wong Cheuk Nam (HKG) | 8.021
5 | Lee Seung-beom (KOR) | 5.525
12 | Lee Yong-su (KOR) | 6.105
2 | Wu Peng (CHN) | 5.240
15 | Shoji Chan (HKG) | 6.223
7 | Ryo Omasa (JPN) | 5.325
10 | Aphiwit Limpanichpakdee (THA) | 6.243
3 | Kiromal Katibin (INA) | 5.167
14 | Lin Chia-hsiang (TPE) | 6.176
6 | Long Jinbao (CHN) | 5.282
11 | Milad Alipour (IRI) | 5.524

Quarterfinals
1 | Veddriq Leonardo (INA) | 5.110
8 | Amir Maimuratov (KAZ) | Fall
4 | Reza Alipour (IRI) | 5.162
5 | Lee Seung-beom (KOR) | 5.417
2 | Wu Peng (CHN) | 5.018
7 | Ryo Omasa (JPN) | 5.161
3 | Kiromal Katibin (INA) | 7.407
6 | Long Jinbao (CHN) | 5.052

Semifinals
1 | Veddriq Leonardo (INA) | 5.619
4 | Reza Alipour (IRI) | 5.163
2 | Wu Peng (CHN) | FS
6 | Long Jinbao (CHN) | —

Final
4 | Reza Alipour (IRI) | 5.302
6 | Long Jinbao (CHN) | Fall
Small final
1 | Veddriq Leonardo (INA) | 4.955
2 | Wu Peng (CHN) | 5.119
