= Chu Shouhong =

Chinese speed climber (born 2007)

Personal information
- Born: 14 April 2007 (age 19)
- Years active: 2022–present

Climbing career
- Type of climber: Competition speed climbing

Sport
- Country: China
Medal record
Men's competition climbing
Representing China
Asian Championships
Gold medal – first place	2026 Meishan	Speed
Asian Games
Gold medal – first place	2026 Aichi–Nagoya	Speed
World Games
Gold medal – first place	2025 Chengdu	Speed
World Youth Championships
Gold medal – first place	2024 Guiyang	Speed

Chu Shouhong (Chinese: 储守宏; born 14 April 2007) is a Chinese competition speed climber.

== Career ==
In August 2024, Chu competed at the 2024 IFSC Climbing World Youth Championships and won a gold medal in the Youth A category.

In August 2025, he represented China at the 2025 World Games and won a gold medal in the speed event with a time of 4.80 seconds.

In April 2026, he competed at the 2026 World Climbing Asia Championship and won a gold medal in the speed event with a time of 4.90 seconds. The next month he competed at the 2026 World Climbing Series in Madrid, and won a gold medal in the speed event. In October 2026, he competed at the 2026 Asian Games and won a gold medal in the speed event with a time of 4.71 seconds.
