= Sport climbing at the 2026 Asian Games – Men's speed =

Men's speed at the 2026 Asian Games
- Venue: Portmesse Nagoya Exhibition Hall 1
- Location: Nagoya, Aichi Prefecture, Japan
- Dates: 30 September – 1 October 2026
- Competitors: 19 from 12 nations

Medalists
gold medal	Chu Shouhong	China
silver medal	Reza Alipour	Iran
bronze medal	Damir Toktarov	Kazakhstan

The men's competition speed climbing event at the 2026 Asian Games took place from 30 September to 1 October 2026 at Portmesse Nagoya Exhibition Hall 1.

== Schedule ==
The schedule is as follows:

Date	Time	Event
Wednesday, 30 September 2026	12:30	Qualification
Thursday, 1 October 2026	20:06	Quarter-finals
Thursday, 1 October 2026	20:19	Semi-finals
Thursday, 1 October 2026	20:28	Finals

== Records ==
Prior to this competition, the existing World, Asian and Games records were as follows.

Record	Athlete	Time	Location	Date
World Record	Zhao Yicheng (CHN)	4.54	Wujiang, China	10 May 2026
Asian Record	Zhao Yicheng (CHN)	4.54	Wujiang, China	10 May 2026
Games Record	Veddriq Leonardo (INA)	4.95	Hangzhou, China	3 October 2023

The following Games records were set during the competition:

Round	Athlete	Time	Date
Qualification	Aditya Tri Syahria (INA)	4.62	30 September 2026

== Results ==
Below the results of the qualification and elimination rounds:

=== Qualification ===
Rank	Athlete	Lane A	Lane B	Lane C	Lane D	Best
1	Aditya Tri Syahria (INA)	4.62 (GR)	4.74	FS	4.70	4.62
2	Long Jianguo (CHN)	4.73	4.64	7.52	4.77	4.64
3	Chu Shouhong (CHN)	5.04	4.67	4.79	4.73	4.67
4	Damir Toktarov (KAZ)	5.00	4.86	4.76	5.03	4.76
5	Veddriq Leonardo (INA)	4.78	5.06	4.99	4.89	4.78
6	Ryo Omasa (JPN)	4.90	4.98	FS	6.24	4.90
7	Shuto Fujino (JPN)	4.974	5.07	5.01	6.46	4.974; TBT 5.014
8	Aphiwit Limpanichpakdee (THA)	5.01	4.974	5.06	Fall	4.974; TBT 5.016
9	Jo Jin-yong (KOR)	5.08	5.04	5.67	5.09	5.04
10	Reza Alipour (IRI)	FS	5.07	5.10	7.86	5.07
11	Deepu Mallesh (IND)	5.19	5.09	5.20	5.20	5.09
12	Amir Maimuratov (KAZ)	8.92	5.11	6.11	5.11	5.11
13	Ezell Low (SGP)	FS	6.43	Fall	5.21	5.21
14	Kim Dong-jun (KOR)	5.38	5.84	FS	5.82	5.38
15	Wong Cheuk Nam (HKG)	Fall	5.77	5.62	5.68	5.62
16	Au Chi Fung (HKG)	5.90	Fall	5.78	FS	5.78
17	Adre bin Alfiyan (SGP)	8.29	5.84	6.10	Fall	5.84
18	Nasser Abu Ergeeb (KUW)	5.92	6.80	6.64	6.61	5.92
19	Omar Abu Hamatto (JOR)	8.90	9.15	8.08	Fall	8.08

=== Quarter-finals ===
Heat 1

Seed	Athlete	Result	Notes
1	Aditya Tri Syahria (INA)	4.83	SF
8	Aphiwit Limpanichpakdee (THA)	5.14	SF
9	Jo Jin-yong (KOR)	5.93	E
16	Au Chi Fung (HKG)	7.14	E

Heat 2

Seed	Athlete	Result	Notes
5	Veddriq Leonardo (INA)	5.29	SF
4	Damir Toktarov (KAZ)	6.14	SF
12	Amir Maimuratov (KAZ)	6.42	E
13	Ezell Low (SGP)	7.36	E

Heat 3

Seed	Athlete	Result	Notes
2	Long Jianguo (CHN)	4.96	SF
10	Reza Alipour (IRI)	5.04	SF
15	Wong Cheuk Nam (HKG)	6.69	E
7	Shuto Fujino (JPN)	6.70	E

Heat 4

Seed	Athlete	Result	Notes
3	Chu Shouhong (CHN)	4.88	SF
6	Ryo Omasa (JPN)	5.00	SF
11	Deepu Mallesh (IND)	5.32	E
14	Kim Dong-jun (KOR)	5.85	E

=== Semi-finals ===
Heat 1

Seed	Athlete	Result	Notes
1	Aditya Tri Syahria (INA)	4.786	F
4	Damir Toktarov (KAZ)	4.789	F
5	Veddriq Leonardo (INA)	4.95	E
8	Aphiwit Limpanichpakdee (THA)	5.04	E

Heat 2

Seed	Athlete	Result	Notes
3	Chu Shouhong (CHN)		F
10	Reza Alipour (IRI)		F
2	Long Jianguo (CHN)	FS	E
6	Ryo Omasa (JPN)	FS	E

=== Final ===
Seed	Athlete	Result	Notes
3	Chu Shouhong (CHN)	4.71	1st place, gold medalist(s)
10	Reza Alipour (IRI)	5.36	2nd place, silver medalist(s)
4	Damir Toktarov (KAZ)	7.34	3rd place, bronze medalist(s)
1	Aditya Tri Syahria (INA)	FS	
