= Seo Chae-hyun =

South Korean rock climber (born 2003)

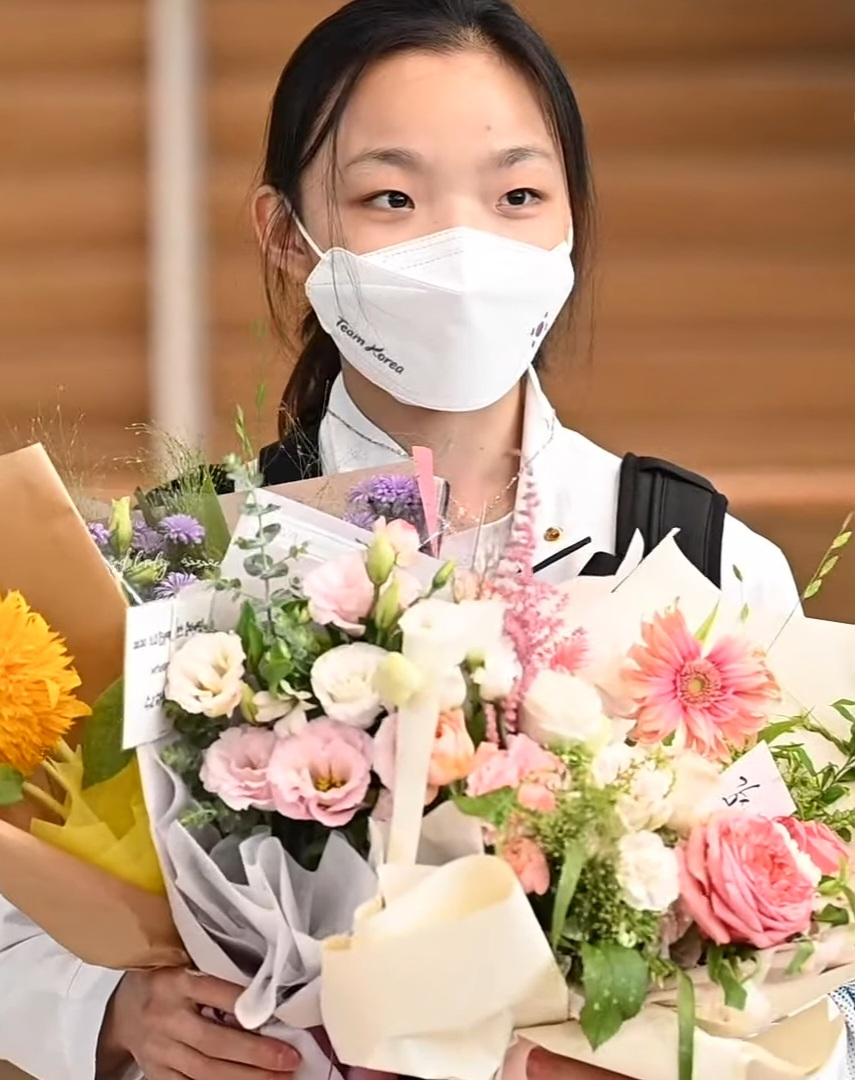
- Seo in 2021

Personal information
- Born: November 1, 2003 (age 22) Seoul, South Korea
- Height: 163 cm (5 ft 4 in)

Climbing career
- Type of climber: Competition climbing; Sport climbing; Bouldering
- Highest grade: Redpoint: 9a+ (5.15a); Onsight/Flash: 8c (5.14b)
- Known for: Winning the overall World Cup for lead in her debut season
Medal record
Women's competition climbing
Representing South Korea
World Championships
Gold medal – first place	2021 Moscow	Lead
Bronze medal – third place	2023 Bern	Lead
Bronze medal – third place	2025 Seoul	Lead
World Cup (Season)
First place	2019	Lead
Second place	2025	Lead
Second place	2022	Lead
Third place	2026	Lead
Asian Championships
Gold medal – first place	2019	Lead
Gold medal – first place	2019	Bouldering
Gold medal – first place	2022	Lead
Gold medal – first place	2022	Combined
Silver medal – second place	2026	Lead
Bronze medal – third place	2022	Bouldering
Asian Games
Gold medal – first place	2026 Aichi–Nagoya	Lead
Silver medal – second place	2022 Hangzhou	Combined
- Updated on April 24, 2024

- Seo Chae-hyun
- Hangul: 서채현
- RR: Seo Chaehyeon
- MR: Sŏ Ch'aehyŏn

Seo Chae-hyun (Korean: 서채현, born November 1, 2003), is a South Korean professional rock climber who specializes in competition climbing. She won the overall 2019 World Cup title in competition lead climbing in her senior debut season. In 2021 she won the IFSC World Championship in lead climbing. Seo is a two-time Olympian, having represented South Korea at the 2020 and 2024 Summer Olympics.

== Early life ==
Seo was born into a family of climbers. She started climbing in 2008. Her father owns a climbing gym in Seoul.

== Climbing career ==
=== Rock climbing ===
In 2018, aged 14, Seo redpointed the 9a (5.14d) graded sport climbing route, Bad Girls Club, at the Wicked Cave, near Rifle, Colorado. On November 22, 2022, aged 19, Seo redpointed the famous 9a+ (5.15a) graded Spanish sport climb, La Rambla, becoming the second-ever woman to redpoint the route. During that same trip to Spain, Seo onsighted the 8c (5.14b) graded route, L'Antagonista, in Serra de Montsant, becoming the second-ever female to on-sight a route at that grade.

=== Competition climbing ===
In 2019, she made her IFSC Climbing World Cup debut and won the Lead World Cup season title ahead of Slovenia's Janja Garnbret and Japan's Natsuki Tanii by earning four gold medals, one silver medal, and one bronze medal. In November of that year she participated in the 2019 Asian Championships, winning gold in both lead and bouldering disciplines. She qualified for the first appearance of sport climbing at the Summer Olympics via her placement in the combined event at the 2019 IFSC Climbing World Championships.

In August 2021, aged 17, Seo competed in the 2020 Summer Olympics and finished in eighth place overall in the women's combined event. A month later she went on to win the World Championship in lead climbing.

In 2022, Seo finished the 2022 IFSC World Cup season placed second overall in lead, having earned three silver medals and two bronze medals. She also won gold medals in lead and combined along with a bronze medal in bouldering at the 2022 Asian Championships.

In 2023, Seo finished third in lead at the World Championships. She also represented South Korea at the 2022 Asian Games where she received the silver medal in the women's combined competition.

Seo qualified for the 2024 Summer Olympics through the Olympic Qualifier Series. In August 2024, she made her second consecutive Olympic Games appearance and finished in sixth place overall in the newly reformatted women's combined event.

== Rankings ==
=== World Cup ===
	2019	2021	2022	2023	2024	2025	2026
Lead	1	17	2	7	4	2	3
Bouldering	–	–	10	10	20	20	36
Speed	80	–	–	–	–	–	–

=== World Championships ===
	2019	2021	2023	2025
Lead	4	1	3	3
Bouldering	13	37	45	13
Speed	50	–	–	–
Combined	13	–	10	–

=== Asian Championships ===
	2019	2022
Lead	1	1
Bouldering	1	3
Speed	15	–
Combined	4	1

== World Cup podiums ==
=== Lead ===
Season	Gold	Silver	Bronze	Total
2019	4	1	1	6
2021		1		1
2022		3	2	5
2024			2	2
2025	2	2		4
2026		1	2	3
Total	6	8	7	21

=== Bouldering ===
Season	Gold	Silver	Bronze	Total
2023		1		1
Total		1		1

=== Combined (Bouldering & Lead) ===
Season	Gold	Silver	Bronze	Total
2022			1	1
Total			1	1

== Television ==
Year	Program	Original title	Network	Role	Note	Ref.
2021	Sporty Sisters 2	노는언니2	E Channel	Guest	Ep. 5, 6, 7	

== See also ==
- List of grade milestones in rock climbing
