= Luo Zhilu =

Chinese sport climber

Personal information
- Nationality: Chinese
- Born: January 11, 2006 (age 20)

Climbing career
- Type of climber: Competition bouldering; Competition lead climbing
Medal record
Women's competition climbing
Representing China
World Cup
Silver medal – second place	Wujiang 2024	Lead
Bronze medal – third place	Brixen 2022	Bouldering
Bronze medal – third place	Keqiao 2024	Bouldering

Luo Zhilu (born January 11, 2006), also known as Zhilu Luo, is a Chinese rock climber who specializes in competition climbing.

== Climbing career ==
In 2022, Luo made her IFSC Climbing World Cup debut at age 16 at the Bouldering World Cup in Brixen, where she advanced to the final and won a bronze medal.

In 2024, Luo opened the season with two straight podium finishes, placing third at the Bouldering World Cup in Keqiao and second at the Lead World Cup in Wujiang. She went on to place fifth in the rankings of the combined bouldering and lead climbing event at the Olympic Qualifier Series, securing a spot for the combined event at the 2024 Summer Olympics in Paris. At the Olympics, she finished in tenth place in the semifinals of the combined event and did not move on to finals.
