= Zhang Yuetong =

Chinese speed climber (born 2003)

Personal information
- Born: 22 February 2003 (age 23)
- Years active: 2018–present

Climbing career
- Type of climber: Competition climbing

Sport
- Country: China
Medal record
Women's competition climbing
Representing China
Asian Games
Gold medal – first place	2026 Aichi–Nagoya	Boulder
Bronze medal – third place	2022 Hangzhou	Combined
Bronze medal – third place	2026 Aichi–Nagoya	Lead

Zhang Yuetong (Chinese: 张悦彤; born 22 February 2003) is a Chinese competition climber. She represented China at the 2024 Summer Olympics.

== Career ==
In November 2023, Zhang won the women's boulder and lead combined competition at the IFSC Asian Qualifier. As a result she qualified to represent China at the 2024 Summer Olympics. She competed in the combined event where she finished in sixth place in the lead semifinal, 15th place in the bouldering semifinal, and 13th overall. She failed to advance to the finals.

In October 2026, she competed at the 2026 Asian Games and won a gold medal in the boulder event with a total score of 85. She also won a bronze medal in the lead event.
