= Pan Yufei =

Chinese climber (born 2000)

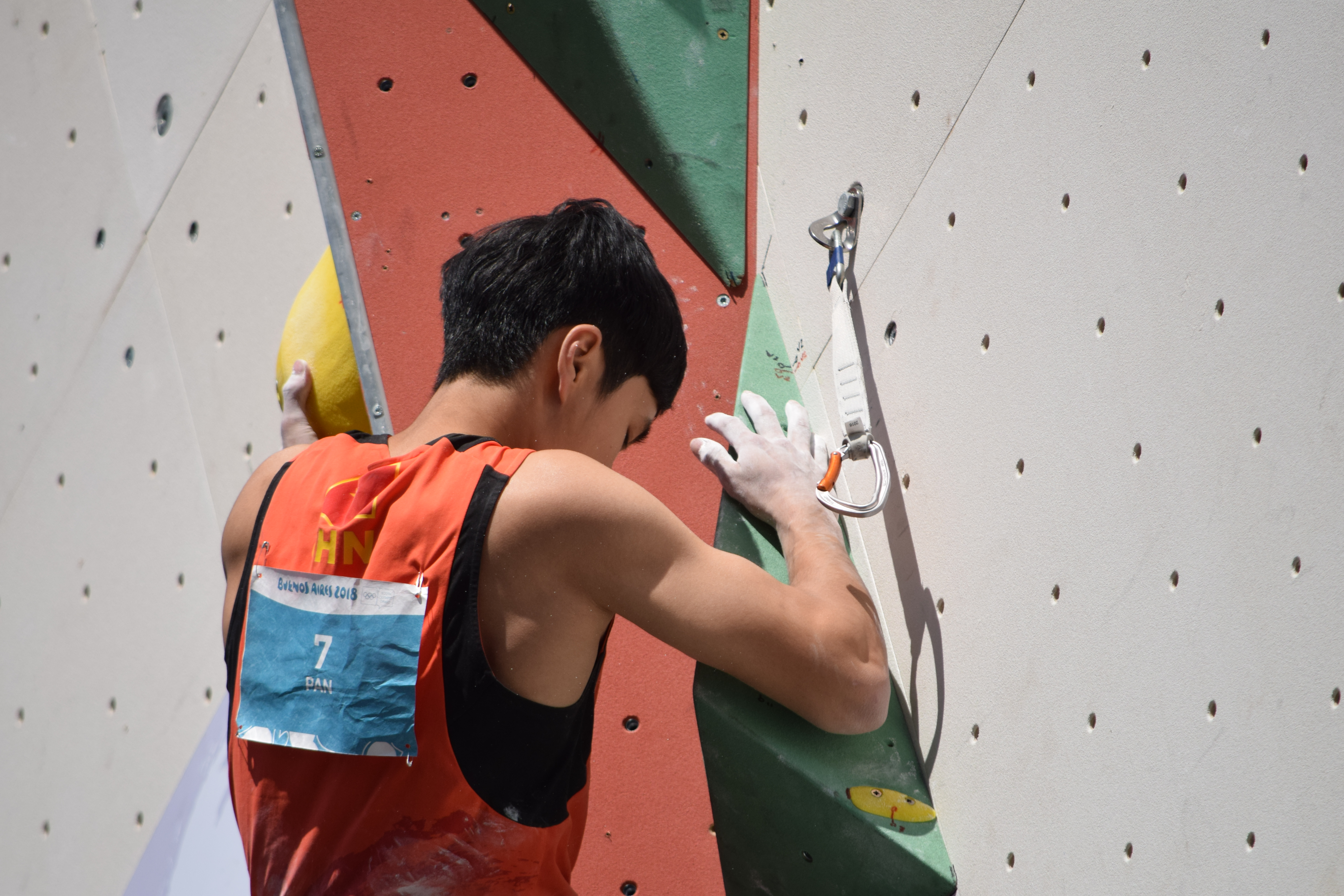
- Pan Yufei at the 2018 Summer Youth Olympics

Personal information
- Nationality: Chinese
- Born: 23 June 2000 (age 26)
- Occupation: Professional climber
- Height: 1.73 m (5 ft 8 in)

Climbing career
- Type of climber: Competition lead climbing; Competition bouldering
Medal record
Men's competition climbing
Representing China
World Cup
First place	Bern 2025	Boulder
Second place	Villars 2019	Lead
Third place	Xiamen 2017	Lead
Asian Games
Third place	Hangzhou 2022	Combined
Asian Championships
Second place	Tai'an 2024	Lead
Third place	Kurayoshi 2018	Combined
Third place	Kurayoshi 2018	Boulder
Second place	Duyun 2016	Lead
Asian Youth Championships
First place	Chongqing 2018	Boulder
Second place	Chongqing 2018	Lead
Third place	Singapore 2017	Lead
First place	Tehran 2016	Lead
Second place	Tehran 2016	Boulder
Second place	Putrajaya 2015	Boulder
Asian Cup
Third place	Hong Kong 2018	Boulder

Pan Yufei (born 23 June 2000) is a Chinese competition climber who specializes in competition bouldering and competition lead climbing. He finished third in the combined event as well as the bouldering event at the 2018 Asian Climbing Championships. He qualified for the combined event at the 2020 Summer Olympics, where he finished 14th out of 20 competitors. In 2024, he qualified for the combined event at the 2024 Summer Olympics, where he finished in 12th place.

== Climbing career ==
=== Competition climbing ===
Pan made his senior international competition climbing debut in 2016.

In 2017, Pan finished on the podium at the Lead World Cup event in Xiamen, collecting the bronze medal in his first-ever World Cup final.

In 2019, Pan claimed the silver medal at the Lead World Cup event in Villars

At the 2025 IFSC Climbing World Cup in Bern, Pan won his first-ever gold medal in the men's Boulder event.

== Rankings ==
=== World Cup ===
Discipline	2016	2017	2018	2019	2022	2023
Lead	55	29	-	12	80	20
Boulder	-	104	57	17	68	34
Speed	54	67	71	-	-	-
Combined	15	69	21	7	-	-

=== World Championships ===
Discipline	Paris 2016	Innsbruck 2018	Hachioji 2019	Bern 2023	Seoul 2025
Lead	59	55	38	21	16
Boulder	57	51	43	33	20
Speed	42	49	31	-	-
Combined	-	35	33	26	-

=== Asian Championships ===
Discipline	2016	2017	2018	2024
Lead	2	6	4	2
Bouldering	26	5	3	5
Speed	-	17	23	-
Combined	-	-	3	-
