= Nagoya International Exhibition Hall =

Exhibition center in the city of Nagoya, Japan

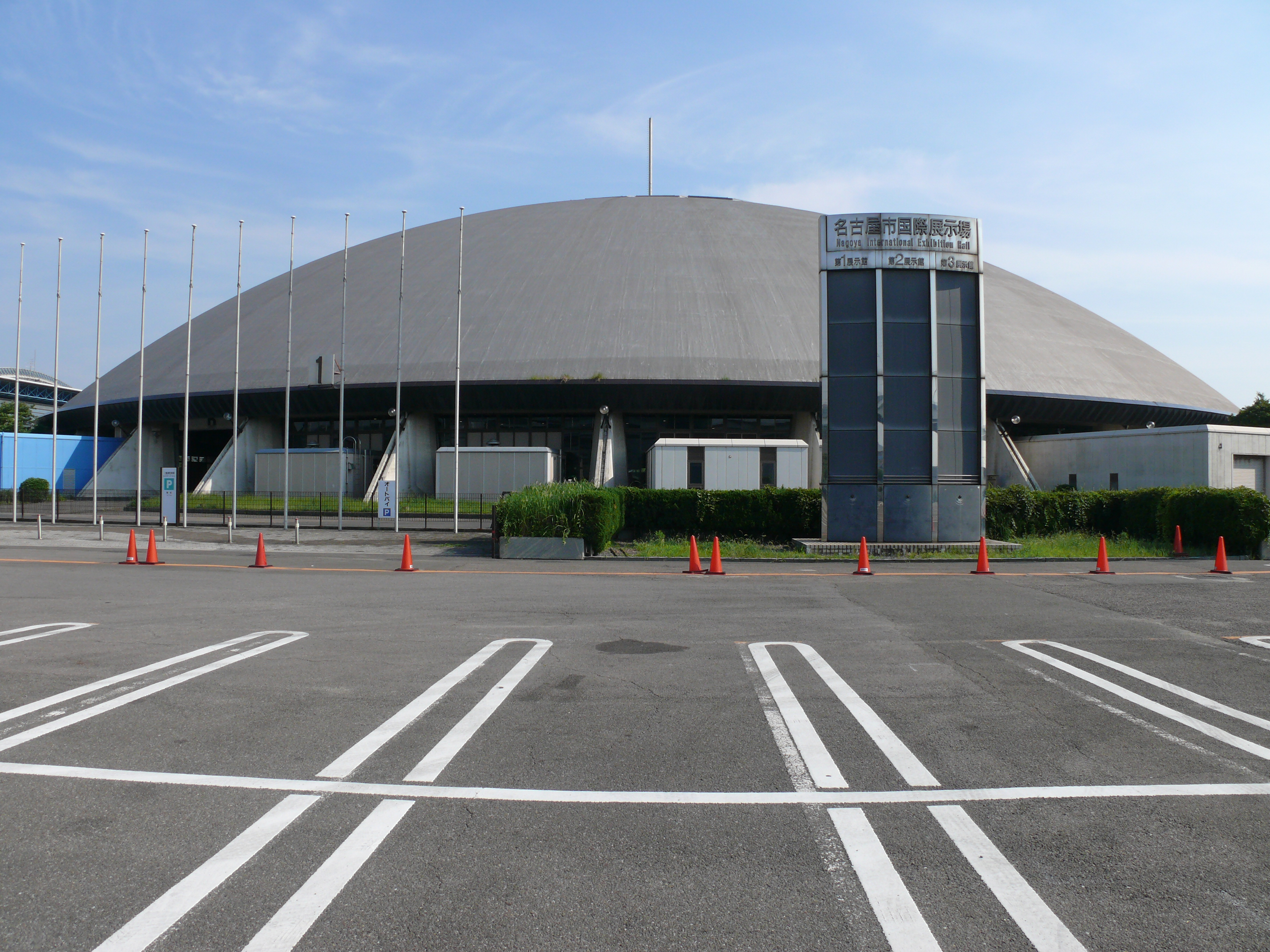
- Interactive map of Nagoya International Exhibition Hall
- Address: 2-2 Kinjo-futo,
- Location: Minato-ku, Nagoya, Aichi, Japan
- Coordinates: 35.048558°N 136.844845°E
- Owner: City of Nagoya
- Operator: Nagoya Industries Promotion Corporation
- Public transit: Kinjō-futō Station

Construction
- Opened: November 1973

Tenant
- 2026 Asian Games

Website
- portmesse.com

Nagoya International Exhibition Hall (名古屋市国際展示場, Nagoya-shi kokusai tenjijō), also known as Portmesse Nagoya (ポートメッセなごや, Pōto messe Nagoya), is an exhibition center in the city of Nagoya, Aichi, Japan.

== Concerts ==
- Queen - Hot Space Tour (October 26, 1982)
- Alexandros - Sleepless in Japan Tour (May 18, 2019)
- Babymetal - Babymetal Arises: Beyond The Moon: Legend M (July 6–7, 2019)
- Twice - Twicelights World Tour (November 29–December 1, 2019)
- Coldrain - Live & Backstage at Blare Fest. 2020 (February 1–2, 2020)
- Alexandros - But wait. Arena? (October 15–16, 2022)
- Janet Jackson - Together Again (March 16, 2024)
- Babymonster - Hello Monsters World Tour (March 22-23, 2025)
- Le Sserafim - Easy Crazy Hot Tour (May 6-7, 2025)
- Ateez - In Your Fantasy Tour (September 20–21, 2025)
