= Lead climbing at the 2021 IFSC Climbing World Cup =

- Location: Innsbruck, Austria; Villars, Switzerland; Chamonix, France; Briançon, France; Kranj, Slovenia
- Dates: 23 June – 4 September 2021

Champions
- Men: (Italy) Stefano Ghisolfi
- Women: (Slovenia) Janja Garnbret

Competition lead climbing at the 2021 IFSC Climbing World Cup was held at five locations, from 23 June to 4 September 2021. The International Federation of Sport Climbing had initially scheduled six competition-lead climbing events concluding on 17 October, but COVID-19 travel restrictions resulted in the cancellation of the event in Xiamen, China.

The top three in each competition received medals, and at the end of the season, the overall winners were awarded trophies. The overall winners were determined based upon points, which athletes were awarded for finishing in the top 30 of each individual event. Stefano Ghisolfi won the men's seasonal title, Janja Garnbret won the women's seasonal title, and Slovenia won the national team title.

== Overview ==
Date	Location	Venue	Route-setters*	Men	Women
June, 23–26	Innsbruck, Austria	Kletterzentrum Innsbruck	(Poland) **Adam Pustelnik**; (Czech Republic) Jan Zbranek; (Japan) Okano Hiroshi	(Austria) Jakob Schubert	(Slovenia) Janja Garnbret
July, 1–3	Villars, Switzerland	Place du Rendez-Vous	(France) **Julien Gras**; (Germany) Christian Bindhammer; (Austria) Reinhard Fichtinger	(United States) Sean Bailey	(Slovenia) Janja Garnbret
July, 12–13	Chamonix, France	Place du Mont Blanc	(Poland) **Marcin Wszolek**; (France) Vincent De Girolamo; (Austria) Florian Murnig	(United States) Sean Bailey	(Italy) Laura Rogora
July, 17–18	Briançon, France	Parc des Sports	(Austria) **Martin Hammerer**; (Russia) Anna Gallyamova; (Italy) Alberto Gnerro	(Italy) Stefano Ghisolfi	(Czech Republic) Eliška Adamovská
September, 3–4	Kranj, Slovenia	Dvorana Zlato polje	(France) **Vincent De Girolamo**; (France) Julien Gras; (Austria) Martin Hammerer	(Japan) Masahiro Higuchi	(Slovenia) Janja Garnbret
**OVERALL WINNERS**				**(Italy) Stefano Ghisolfi**	**(Slovenia) Janja Garnbret**
**NATIONAL TEAM**				**Slovenia**	

* Chief route-setters are in bold.

== Overall ranking ==
The overall ranking is determined based upon points, which athletes are awarded for finishing in the top 30 of each individual event. There are five competitions in the season. The national ranking is the sum of the points of that country's three best male and female athletes. Results displayed in parentheses are not counted.

=== Men ===
The results of the ten most successful athletes of the Lead World Cup 2021:

Rank	NAME	Points	Innsbruck	Villars	Chamonix	Briançon	Kranj
1	(Italy) Stefano Ghisolfi	319	2. 80	11. 31	2. 80	1. 100	12. 28
2	(United States) Sean Bailey	277	( — )	1. 100	1. 100	4. 55	15. 22
3	(Japan) Masahiro Higuchi	263	4. 55	7. 43	9. 37	12. 28	1. 100
4	(Slovenia) Luka Potočar	212	7. 43	25. 6	7. 43	8. 40	2. 80
5	(Switzerland) Sascha Lehmann	204	3. 65	12. 28	4. 55	5. 51	26. 5
6	(Czech Republic) Martin Stráník	192.87	12. 28	32. 0.87	3. 65	3. 65	10. 34
7	(Spain) Alberto Ginés López	169	5. 51	5. 51	14. 24	7. 43	( — )
8	(Germany) Sebastian Halenke	160.0	57. 0	4. 55	15. 22	17. 18	3. 65
9	(Slovenia) Domen Škofic	135	17. 18	15. 22	25. 6	10. 34	4. 55
10	(Germany) Alexander Megos	127	6. 47	2. 80	( — )	( — )	( — )

=== Women ===
The results of the ten most successful athletes of the Lead World Cup 2021:

Rank	NAME	Points	Innsbruck	Villars	Chamonix	Briançon	Kranj
1	(Slovenia) Janja Garnbret	300	1. 100	1. 100	( — )	( — )	1. 100
2	(United States) Natalia Grossman	296	25. 6	3. 65	2. 80	2. 80	3. 65
3	(Italy) Laura Rogora	278	7. 43	2. 80	1. 100	( — )	4. 55
4	(Slovenia) Vita Lukan	269	6. 47	5. 51	4. 55	3. 65	5. 51
5	(Slovenia) Lucka Rakovec	185	8. 40	7. 43	23. 8	6. 47	6. 47
6	(Bulgaria) Aleksandra Totkova	168	18. 16	6. 47	3. 65	8. 40	( — )
7	(Czech Republic) Eliška Adamovská	162	12. 28	( — )	10. 34	1. 100	( — )
8	(Japan) Momoko Abe	146	13. 26	4. 55	11. 31	25. 6	12. 28
9	(Japan) Natsuki Tanii	128	( — )	( — )	5. 51	9. 37	8. 40
9	(Slovenia) Lana Skusek	128	16. 20	11. 31	43. 0	7. 43	10. 34

=== National Teams ===
The results of the ten most successful countries of the Lead World Cup 2021:

Country names as used by the IFSC

Rank	Nation	Points	Innsbruck	Villars	Chamonix	Briançon	Kranj
1	Slovenia	1244.0	2. 274.0	2. 229.0	5. 135.0	1. 230.0	1. 376.0
2	(Japan)	1041.0	1. 279.0	3. 193.0	4. 158.0	5. 134.0	2. 277.0
3	United States	905.95	5. 110.55	1. 269.0	2. 237.0	2. 200.5	5. 88.9
4	Italy	796.8	3. 149.75	6. 132.85	1. 244.5	4. 164.0	4. 105.7
5	France	593.95	8. 80.75	5. 147.2	3. 192.0	7. 87.0	6. 87.0
6	Germany	547.2	10. 57.2	4. 159.0	7. 91.35	6. 95.85	3. 143.8
7	Czech Republic	396.55	7. 96.0	19. 0.9	6. 99.85	3. 165.8	13. 34.0
8	Austria	364.25	4. 117.65	7. 71.75	13. 35.5	9. 77.75	8. 61.6
9	Switzerland	340.15	6. 96.3	9. 50.4	8. 86.8	10. 70.95	12. 35.7
10	Russia	262.55	9. 57.75	11. 41.8	12. 40.0	8. 80.0	11. 43.0

== Innsbruck, Austria (June, 23–26) ==
=== Men ===
99 men competed in the event.

Italy's Stefano Ghisolfi set an early high-point in the final which could only be surpassed by Austria's Jakob Schubert who took first place in front of his home crowd. Switzerland's Sascha Lehmann took third place after pushing Japan's Masahiro Higuchi to fourth place on count-back. Czech Republic's superstar Adam Ondra slipped low down on the final route and placed 8th.

Rank	Name	Qualification					Semi-Final	Final
Rank	Name	Route 1		Route 2		Points	Semi-Final	Final
Rank	Name	Score	Rank	Score	Rank	Points	Semi-Final	Final
1st place, gold medalist(s)	(Austria) Jakob Schubert	38	1	38+	3	1.73	39+	47+
2nd place, silver medalist(s)	(Italy) Stefano Ghisolfi	37	3	35	6	5.1	31+	47
3rd place, bronze medalist(s)	(Switzerland) Sascha Lehmann	34+	8	31+	14	11.62	39+	38+
4	(Japan) Masahiro Higuchi	37	3	11	89	18.97	34+	38+
5	(Spain) Alberto Ginés López	32	16	34+	8	12.33	41+	37+
6	(Germany) Alexander Megos	37	3	39+	2	2.83	38+	37+
7	(Slovenia) Luka Potočar	32+	13	23	34	21.82	39+	27+
8	(Czech Republic) Adam Ondra	37+	2	TOP	1	1.41	42+	17

=== Women ===
75 women competed in the event.

Slovenia's Janja Garnbret claimed the only top on the final route, claiming the win. USA's Brooke Raboutou placed second while Japan's Akiyo Noguchi placed third.

Rank	Name	Qualification					Semi-Final	Final
Rank	Name	Route 1		Route 2		Points	Semi-Final	Final
Rank	Name	Score	Rank	Score	Rank	Points	Semi-Final	Final
1st place, gold medalist(s)	(Slovenia) Janja Garnbret	TOP	1	TOP	1	1.41	42+	TOP
2nd place, silver medalist(s)	(United States) Brooke Raboutou	39+	4	TOP	1	2.83	36.5+	40
3rd place, bronze medalist(s)	(Japan) Akiyo Noguchi	31	11	35+	4	7.5	32+	33+
4	(Russia) Viktoriia Meshkova	31+	7	33+	10	10.91	35	22+
5	(Japan) Miho Nonaka	31	11	33+	10	13.23	32	22+
6	(Slovenia) Vita Lukan	41	3	34	7	4.9	35+	19+
7	(Italy) Laura Rogora	46+	2	TOP	1	2.0	42	13+
8	(Slovenia) Lucka Rakovec	33	5	34	7	6.32	36.5+	13+

== Villars, Switzerland (July, 1–3) ==
=== Men ===
68 men competed in the event.

USA's Sean Bailey won the gold medal. Germany's Alexander Megos took second while USA's Colin Duffy took third.

Rank	Name	Qualification					Semi-Final	Final
Rank	Name	Route 1		Route 2		Points	Semi-Final	Final
Rank	Name	Score	Rank	Score	Rank	Points	Semi-Final	Final
1st place, gold medalist(s)	(United States) Sean Bailey	TOP	1	32+	18	9.64	40	38
2nd place, silver medalist(s)	(Germany) Alexander Megos	39+	8	TOP	1	5.61	37+	35+
3rd place, bronze medalist(s)	(United States) Colin Duffy	38+	16	TOP	1	7.04	36	31+
4	(Germany) Sebastian Halenke	39+	8	32+	18	18.04	37+	26.5+
5	(Spain) Alberto Ginés López	39+	8	33	15	12.96	40+	26.5
6	(France) Paul Jenft	35	21	TOP	1	8.31	36	26
7	(Japan) Masahiro Higuchi	39+	8	32+	18	18.04	37+	12
8	(Japan) Zento Murashita	35	21	34	8	14.78	36+	11+

=== Women ===
53 women competed in the event.

Slovenia's Janja Garnbret topped all the routes in the competition, taking the win. Italy's Laura Rogora also topped the final route, but took silver due to count-back. USA's Natalia Grossman took bronze.

Rank	Name	Qualification					Semi-Final	Final
Rank	Name	Route 1		Route 2		Points	Semi-Final	Final
Rank	Name	Score	Rank	Score	Rank	Points	Semi-Final	Final
1st place, gold medalist(s)	(Slovenia) Janja Garnbret	TOP	1	TOP	1	1.41	TOP	TOP
2nd place, silver medalist(s)	(Italy) Laura Rogora	20+	17	TOP	1	7.35	45+	TOP
3rd place, bronze medalist(s)	(United States) Natalia Grossman	35+	5	40+	4	5.24	34+	42+
4	(Japan) Momoko Abe	36+	3	TOP	1	2.65	35+	40+
5	(Slovenia) Vita Lukan	20+	17	40+	4	12.19	35+	40+
6	(Bulgaria) Aleksandra Totkova	32+	6	35+	11	8.46	36+	33+
7	(Slovenia) Lucka Rakovec	37	2	40+	4	3.32	40+	17+
8	(Slovenia) Mia Krampl	36+	3	35	12	6.48	35	17+

== Chamonix, France (July, 12–13) ==
=== Men ===
73 men competed in the event.

USA's Sean Bailey claimed his second win in the Lead World Cup. Italy's Stefano Ghisolfi and Czech Republic's Martin Stráník fell at the same crux in the final round and placed second and third respectively on count-back.

Rank	Name	Qualification					Semi-Final	Final
Rank	Name	Route 1		Route 2		Points	Semi-Final	Final
Rank	Name	Score	Rank	Score	Rank	Points	Semi-Final	Final
1st place, gold medalist(s)	(United States) Sean Bailey	37+	5	40	10	8.31	43	34+
2nd place, silver medalist(s)	(Italy) Stefano Ghisolfi	32+	26	TOP	1	11.62	46	32
3rd place, bronze medalist(s)	(Czech Republic) Martin Stráník	35+	10	39	17	14.9	43	32
4	(Switzerland) Sascha Lehmann	37	8	TOP	1	6.0	47+	29
5	(Canada) Victor Baudrand	TOP	1	38	21	5.61	41+	28+
6	(Italy) Marcello Bombardi	35+	10	40+	9	10.39	41+	26+
7	(Slovenia) Luka Potočar	33+	19	40	10	15.91	45	25+
8	(France) Paul Jenft	32+	26	TOP	1	11.62	45+	25

=== Women ===
62 women competed in the event.

Italy's Laura Rogora topped three out of four routes in the competition, earning her a gold medal. USA's Natalia Grossman placed second while Bulgaria's Aleksandra Totkova placed third.

Rank	Name	Qualification					Semi-Final	Final
Rank	Name	Route 1		Route 2		Points	Semi-Final	Final
Rank	Name	Score	Rank	Score	Rank	Points	Semi-Final	Final
1st place, gold medalist(s)	(Italy) Laura Rogora	44+	21	TOP	1	9.81	TOP	TOP
2nd place, silver medalist(s)	(United States) Natalia Grossman	50	2	TOP	1	3.24	TOP	41+
3rd place, bronze medalist(s)	(Bulgaria) Aleksandra Totkova	50	2	48	7	4.58	TOP	38+
4	(Slovenia) Vita Lukan	49+	5	41+	12	8.49	TOP	38+
5	(Japan) Natsuki Tanii	44+	21	47	8	14.83	TOP	32+
6	(France) Julia Chanourdie	49	8	TOP	1	5.77	TOP	29+
7	(United States) Ashima Shiraishi	47	18	40+	14	15.87	TOP	29+
8	(Russia) Dinara Fakhritdinova	49	8	TOP	1	5.77	TOP	28+

== Briançon, France (July, 17–18) ==
=== Men ===
68 men competed in the event.

Italy's Stefano Ghisolfi fell high on the head-wall and won the gold medal. Russia's Dmitrii Fakirianov and Czech Republic's Martin Stráník placed second and third respectively.

Rank	Name	Qualification					Semi-Final	Final
Rank	Name	Route 1		Route 2		Points	Semi-Final	Final
Rank	Name	Score	Rank	Score	Rank	Points	Semi-Final	Final
1st place, gold medalist(s)	(Italy) Stefano Ghisolfi	32+	2	32+	4	3.0	42+	42+
2nd place, silver medalist(s)	(Russia) Dmitrii Fakirianov	15	52	33+	2	11.51	40+	39+
3rd place, bronze medalist(s)	(Czech Republic) Martin Stráník	29+	3	29	8	5.66	39+	37+
4	(United States) Sean Bailey	29+	3	27	16	8.0	42+	36
5	(Switzerland) Sascha Lehmann	22+	16	32+	4	9.25	37+	35
6	(Ukraine) Fedir Samoilov	29	6	27+	13	9.54	37	35
7	(Spain) Alberto Ginés López	22+	16	33+	2	6.89	37	27+
8	(Slovenia) Luka Potočar	33	1	30+	7	2.65	37	22

=== Women ===
56 women competed in the event.

Czech Republic's Eliška Adamovská claimed her first gold medal. USA's Natalia Grossman placed second while Slovenia's Vita Lukan placed third.

Rank	Name	Qualification					Semi-Final	Final
Rank	Name	Route 1		Route 2		Points	Semi-Final	Final
Rank	Name	Score	Rank	Score	Rank	Points	Semi-Final	Final
1st place, gold medalist(s)	(Czech Republic) Eliška Adamovská	30	5	27+	17	9.35	TOP	36
2nd place, silver medalist(s)	(United States) Natalia Grossman	34+	1	36	1	1.0	TOP	35+
3rd place, bronze medalist(s)	(Slovenia) Vita Lukan	12	49	35+	2	13.1	TOP	29
4	(United States) Ashima Shiraishi	23+	23	32+	8	13.98	TOP	27+
5	(Japan) Ryu Nakagawa	31+	3	24	37	11.53	36+	27+
6	(Slovenia) Lucka Rakovec	33+	2	35+	2	2.65	TOP	26+
7	(Slovenia) Lana Skusek	28+	7	34+	6	7.55	38	24+
8	(Bulgaria) Aleksandra Totkova	27+	14	28	15	14.73	41	22+

== Kranj, Slovenia (September, 3–4) ==
=== Men ===
61 men competed in the event.

Japan's Masahiro Higuchi won his first World Cup gold medal. Slovenia's Luka Potočar placed second and Germany's Sebastian Halenke placed second and third respectively on count-back. Italy's Stefano Ghisolfi, placing 12th in the competition, was crowned this season overall Lead World Cup champion.

Rank	Name	Qualification					Semi-Final	Final
Rank	Name	Route 1		Route 2		Points	Semi-Final	Final
Rank	Name	Score	Rank	Score	Rank	Points	Semi-Final	Final
1st place, gold medalist(s)	(Japan) Masahiro Higuchi	29+	14	37+	8	12.96	41+	37
2nd place, silver medalist(s)	(Slovenia) Luka Potočar	18+	46	TOP	1	10.95	41	31+
3rd place, bronze medalist(s)	(Germany) Sebastian Halenke	29+	14	38	5	9.8	40+	31+
4	(Slovenia) Domen Škofic	TOP	1	TOP	1	3.71	29+	31+
5	(Ukraine) Fedir Samoilov	25+	25	37+	8	16.84	37+	30+
6	(Japan) Satone Yoshida	29+	14	37+	8	12.96	40+	16+
7	(Slovenia) Milan Preskar	TOP	1	35	19	10.49	34+	15+
8	(Japan) Ao Yurikusa	TOP	1	38	5	5.74	33+	15+

=== Women ===
45 women competed in the event.

Slovenia's Janja Garnbret, back from the 2020 Tokyo Olympics, claimed the gold medal and by doing so also claimed the overall Lead World Cup title. South Korea's Chaehyun Seo claimed silver while USA's Natalia Grossman claimed bronze.

Rank	Name	Qualification					Semi-Final	Final
Rank	Name	Route 1		Route 2		Points	Semi-Final	Final
Rank	Name	Score	Rank	Score	Rank	Points	Semi-Final	Final
1st place, gold medalist(s)	(Slovenia) Janja Garnbret	TOP	1	43+	8	5.34	47+	49+
2nd place, silver medalist(s)	(South Korea) Chaehyun Seo	TOP	1	TOP	1	3.0	36	46
3rd place, bronze medalist(s)	(United States) Natalia Grossman	29+	10	TOP	1	6.0	37+	41+
4	(Italy) Laura Rogora	TOP	1	TOP	1	3.0	44+	39
5	(Slovenia) Vita Lukan	34+	6	43+	8	8.15	38+	39
6	(Slovenia) Lucka Rakovec	29	15	44	7	10.42	36+	34+
7	(Russia) Dinara Fakhritdinova	34+	6	TOP	1	4.58	35+	31+
8	(Japan) Natsuki Tanii	25+	18	36	28	24.17	34+	26
