= Bouldering at the 2021 IFSC Climbing World Cup =

- Location: Meiringen, Switzerland Salt Lake City (2 times), United States Innsbruck, Austria
- Dates: 16 April – 26 June 2021

Champions
- Men: (Japan) Yoshiyuki Ogata
- Women: (United States) Natalia Grossman

The 2021 season of the IFSC Climbing World Cup was the 22nd season of the competition. Bouldering competitions will be held at six stops of the IFSC Climbing World Cup. The bouldering season began on April 16 at the World Cup in Meiringen, and concluded on 26 June with the World Cup in Innsbruck. The International Federation of Sport Climbing had initially scheduled six bouldering events concluding on 24 October, but COVID-19 travel restrictions resulted in the cancellation of events in Wujiang in China and Seoul in South Korea.

At each stop a qualifying was held on the first day of the competition, and the semi-final and final rounds were conducted on the second day of the competition. At the end of the season an overall ranking will be determined based upon points, which athletes were awarded for finishing in the top 30 of each individual event.

== Overview ==
Date	Location	Venue	Route-setters*	Men	Women
April, 16–18	Meiringen, Switzerland	Kletterhalle Haslital	(Japan) **Gen Hirashima**; (France) Remi Samyn; (France) Laurent Laporte	(Czech Republic) Adam Ondra	(Slovenia) Janja Garnbret
May, 21-22	Salt Lake City, United States	Industry SLC	(United Kingdom) **Jamie Cassidy**; (United States) Brad Weaver; (Japan) Tsukasa Mizuguchi	(Czech Republic) Adam Ondra	(United States) Natalia Grossman
May, 28–30	Salt Lake City, United States	Industry SLC	(United Kingdom) **Jamie Cassidy**; (United States) Garret Gregor; (United Kingdom) Yann Genoux; (United States) Flannery Shay-Nemirow	(United States) Sean Bailey	(United States) Natalia Grossman
June, 23–26	Innsbruck, Austria	Kletterzentrum Innsbruck	(United Kingdom) **Percy Bishton**; (Switzerland) Manuel Hassler; (France) Romain Cabessut; (United States) Garret Gregor	(Japan) Yoshiyuki Ogata	(Slovenia) Janja Garnbret
**OVERALL WINNERS**				(Japan) Yoshiyuki Ogata	(United States) Natalia Grossman
**NATIONAL TEAM**				Japan	

* Chief route-setters are in bold.

== Overall ranking ==
The overall ranking is determined based upon points, which athletes are awarded for finishing in the top 30 of each individual event. There are five competitions in the season, but only the best five attempts are counted. The national ranking is the sum of the points of that country's three best male and female athletes. Results displayed (in brackets) are not counted.

=== Men ===
The results of the twenty most successful athletes of the Bouldering World Cup 2021:

Rank	Name	Points	Meiringen	Salt Lake City I	Salt Lake City II	Innsbruck
1	(Japan) Yoshiyuki Ogata	255	2. 80	16. 20	4. 55	1. 100
2	(Japan) Kokoro Fujii	255	4. 55	4. 55	2. 80	3. 65
3	(Czech Republic) Adam Ondra	200	1. 100	1. 100	( — )	( — )
4	(United States) Sean Bailey	166	13. 26	8. 40	1. 100	47. 0
5	(France) Mejdi Schalck	157	12. 28	2. 80	9. 37	20. 12
6	(Japan) Tomoa Narasaki	145	( — )	( — )	3. 65	2. 80
7	(United States) Nathaniel Coleman	142	5. 51	21. 10	10. 34	6. 47
8	(Austria) Nicolai Užnik	132	14. 24	11. 31	15. 22	4. 55
9	(Germany) Alexander Megos	129	8. 40	9. 37	14. 24	12. 28
10	(Belgium) Simon Lorenzi	123.5	29. 1.5	7. 43	12. 28	5. 51
11	(Japan) Sohta Amagasa	119	6. 47	14. 24	13. 26	15. 22
12	(Russia) Alexey Rubtsov	114	17. 18	15. 22	11. 31	7. 43
13	(Slovenia) Gregor Vezonik	98.5	9. 37	6. 47	24. 7	23. 7.5
13	(Slovenia) Anže Peharc	98.5	21. 9.5	5. 51	16. 20	17. 18
15	(Austria) Jakob Schubert	96.5	23. 7.5	3. 65	( — )	14. 24
16	(Japan) Tomoaki Takata	94.9	3. 65	22. 9	32. 0.9	16. 20
17	(Japan) Rei Sugimoto	77.5	21. 9.5	17. 18	18. 16	10. 34
18	(France) Manuel Cornu	75.4	11. 31	35. 0.8	7. 43	37. 0.6
19	(United States) Colin Duffy	64.5	31. 0.9	13. 26	38. 0.6	9. 37
20	(Germany) Yannick Flohé	63	19. 13	24. 7	20. 12	11. 31

=== Women ===
The results of the twenty most successful athletes of the Bouldering World Cup 2021:

Rank	Name	Points	Meiringen	Salt Lake City I	Salt Lake City II	Innsbruck
1	(United States) Natalia Grossman	345	3. 65	1. 100	1. 100	2. 80
2	(Slovenia) Janja Garnbret	280	1. 100	( — )	2. 80	1. 100
3	(France) Oriane Bertone	235	2. 80	2. 80	4. 55	16. 20
4	(United States) Brooke Raboutou	207	9. 37	3. 65	3. 65	8. 40
5	(Japan) Miho Nonaka	192	7. 43	4. 55	6. 47	6. 47
6	(Serbia) Staša Gejo	173	13. 26	11. 31	5. 51	3. 65
7	(Slovenia) Katja Debevec	158	6. 47	8. 40	7. 43	12. 28
8	(Japan) Futaba Ito	135	( — )	7. 43	9. 37	4. 55
9	(Japan) Akiyo Noguchi	122	4. 55	( — )	18. 16	5. 51
10	(Japan) Mao Nakamura	92	( — )	10. 34	14. 24	10. 34
11	(Austria) Johanna Färber	91.7	31. 0.9	6. 47	34. 0.8	7. 43
12	(Austria) Jessica Pilz	79	12. 28	5. 51	( — )	( — )
13	(Austria) Franziska Sterrer	78.5	11. 31	21. 95	20. 12	13. 26
14	(Slovenia) Vita Lukan	77	5. 51	23. 8	17. 18	( — )
15	(Switzerland) Petra Klingler	74.5	21. 9.5	25. 6	12. 28	11. 31
16	(France) Fanny Gibert	72.5	35. 0.7	9. 37	10. 34	33. 0.8
17	(Switzerland) Andrea Kümin	69	8. 40	26. 5	( — )	14. 24
18	(United States) Kylie Cullen	67.5	25. 5.5	14. 24	16. 20	17. 18
19	(United States) Kyra Condie	60	21. 9.5	30. 1	8. 40	21. 9.5
20	(Belgium) Chloe Caulier	58.5	25. 5.5	13. 26	26. 5	15. 22

* = Joint place with another athlete

=== National teams ===
The results of the ten most successful countries of the Bouldering World Cup 2021:

Country names as used by the IFSC

Rank	Name	Points	Meiringen	Salt Lake City I	Salt Lake City II	Innsbruck
1	Japan	1235.0	2. 298.0	3. 231.0	2. 308.0	1. 398.0
2	United States	1088.0	3. 209.0	1. 265.0	1. 390.0	2. 224.0
3	Slovenia	798.0	1. 312.0	5. 148.0	4. 168.0	3. 170.0
4	France	635.85	4. 156.6	2. 238.75	3. 177.0	8. 63.5
5	Austria	498.25	7. 91.95	4. 204.0	10. 34.8	4. 167.5
6	Germany	403.1	6. 93.5	6. 119.0	5. 108.0	5. 82.6
7	Belgium	215.55	12. 22.0	8. 69.55	7. 51.0	6. 73.0
8	Czech Republic	200.0	5. 100.0	7. 100.0	( — )	( — )
9	Italy	190.6	11. 22.95	9. 66.0	9. 45.7	10. 55.95
10	Serbia	173.0	10. 26.0	11. 31.0	7. 51.0	7. 65.0

== Meiringen, Switzerland (16–17 April) ==
=== Men ===
101 athletes attended the World Cup in Meiringen.

Rank	Name	Score
1	(Czech Republic) Adam Ondra	3T3z 10 7
2	(Japan) Yoshiyuki Ogata	2T4z 7 9
3	(Japan) Tomoaki Takata	1T4z 4 12
4	(Japan) Kokoro Fujii	1T3z 1 4
5	(United States) Nathaniel Coleman	1T3z 2 5
6	(Japan) Sohta Amagasa	0T3z 0 4

=== Women ===
70 athletes attended the World Cup in Meiringen.

Rank	Name	Score
1	(Slovenia) Janja Garnbret	4T4z 7 6
2	(France) Oriane Bertone	2T4z 8 10
3	(United States) Natalia Grossman	2T4z 10 10
4	(Japan) Akiyo Noguchi	0T3z 0 7
5	(Slovenia) Vita Lukan	0T2z 0 3
6	(Slovenia) Katja Debevec	0T2z 0 6

== Salt Lake City I, United States (21–22 May) ==
=== Men ===
55 athletes attended the first World Cup in Salt Lake City.

Rank	Name	Score
1	(Czech Republic) Adam Ondra	4T4z 8 7
2	(France) Mejdi Schalck	3T4z 4 5
3	(Austria) Jakob Schubert	3T3z 4 4
4	(Japan) Kokoro Fujii	3T3z 12 7
5	(Slovenia) Anže Peharc	1T3z 2 8
6	(Slovenia) Gregor Vezonik	1T2z 2 2

=== Women ===
50 athletes attended the first World Cup in Salt Lake City.

Rank	Name	Score
1	(United States) Natalia Grossman	4T4z 15 14
2	(France) Oriane Bertone	3T4z 7 7
3	(United States) Brooke Raboutou	3T3z 4 3
4	(Japan) Miho Nonaka	3T3z 7 6
5	(Austria) Jessica Pilz	1T3z 3 6
6	(Austria) Johanna Färber	1T2z 1 8

== Salt Lake City II, United States (28–30 May) ==
=== Men ===
55 athletes attended the second World Cup in Salt Lake City.

Rank	Name	Score
1	(United States) Sean Bailey	2T4z 9 11
2	(Japan) Kokoro Fujii	1T4z 9 12
3	(Japan) Tomoa Narasaki	1T3z 1 3
4	(Japan) Yoshiyuki Ogata	0T2z 0 4
5	(United States) Zach Galla	0T1z 0 1
6	(United Kingdom) Maximillian Milne	0T1z 0 2

=== Women ===
51 athletes attended the second World Cup in Salt Lake City. Natalia Grossman won the competition, becoming the first athlete to best Janja Garnbret in a bouldering World Cup since Meiringen in April 2018, thus ending Garnbret's streak at nine consecutive wins.

Rank	Name	Score
1	(United States) Natalia Grossman	4T4z 4 4
2	(Slovenia) Janja Garnbret	4T4z 6 6
3	(United States) Brooke Raboutou	3T4z 5 8
4	(France) Oriane Bertone	3T3z 9 5
5	(Serbia) Staša Gejo	3T3z 11 10
6	(Japan) Miho Nonaka	2T4z 5 9

== Innsbruck, Austria (23–26 June) ==
=== Men ===
110 athletes attended the World Cup in Innsbruck. Because of rain delays and restrictions surrounding the COVID-19 pandemic in Austria, the final round was cut short and only three of the four boulders were used.

Rank	Name	Score
1	(Japan) Yoshiyuki Ogata	2T2z 7 7
2	(Japan) Tomoa Narasaki	1T3z 2 11
3	(Japan) Kokoro Fujii	1T1z 2 2
4	(Austria) Nicolai Uznik	1T1z 2 2
5	(Belgium) Simon Lorenzi	1T1z 10 10
6	(United States) Nathaniel Coleman	0T1z 0 2

=== Women ===
89 athletes attended the second World Cup in Innsbruck. Because of rain delays, the finals were cut short and only the first three of the four boulders in that round were counted towards the results. Miho Nonaka was forced to withdraw from the final after a knee injury she picked up on W4 in the semi-final round.

Coverage of the Austrian climber Johanna Färber received criticism from viewers and she described it as "disrespectful and upsetting". The host broadcaster, ORF, issued an apology after the event.

Rank	Name	Score
1	(Slovenia) Janja Garnbret	3T3z 3 3
2	(United States) Natalia Grossman	3T3z 9 9
3	(Serbia) Staša Gejo	1T3z 2 6
4	(Japan) Futaba Ito	1T2z 3 8
5	(Japan) Akiyo Noguchi	1T1z 1 1
6	(Japan) Miho Nonaka	DNS
