= Sport climbing at the 2023 Pan American Games – Men's boulder & lead =

Men's boulder & lead at the 2023 Pan American Games
- Venue: Cerrillos Park Climbing Walls
- Dates: October 21 - October 23
- Competitors: 20 from 7 nations
- Winning score: 161.5

Medalists
Gold medal	Jesse Grupper	United States
Silver medal	Sean Bailey	United States
Bronze medal	Zachary Galla	United States

The men's combined competition lead climbing & competition bouldering event at the 2023 Pan American Games was held from October 21 to 23 at the Cerrillos Park Climbing Walls in Santiago, Chile.

== Schedule ==
Date	Time	Round
October 21, 2023	10:00	Semifinals - Boulder Stage
October 21, 2023	13:00	Semifinals - Lead Stage
October 23, 2023	18:05	Finals - Boulder Stage
October 23, 2023	20:12	Finals - Lead Stage

== Results ==
=== Semifinals ===
The highest eight scores advance to the finals.

Rank	Climber	Nation	Boulder					Lead	Total
Rank	Climber	Nation	1	2	3	4	Total	Lead	Total
1	Jesse Grupper	United States	24.9	24.9	25.0	25.0	99.8	92.1	191.9
2	Sean Bailey	United States	10.0	24.7	24.5	25.0	84.2	80	164.2
3	Sean McColl	Canada	9.9	24.9	24.9	25.0	84.7	68.1	152.8
4	Oscar Baudrand	Canada	25.0	24.9	24.7	25.0	99.6	48.1	147.7
5	Zachary Galla	United States	24.9	24.9	4.9	25.0	79.7	54.1	133.8
6	Victor Baudrand	Canada	25.0	24.8	4.8	25.0	79.6	54.1	133.7
7	Benjamín Vargas	Chile	10.0	24.8	24.4	24.9	84.1	36.1	120.2
8	Thor Villegas	Mexico	9.8	24.9	9.7	25.0	69.4	45.1	114.5
9	Joaquín Urrutia	Chile	9.6	24.8	4.9	25.0	64.3	48	112.3
10	Felipe Ho	Brazil	9.8	24.8	5.0	25.0	64.6	45.1	109.7
11	Jair Moreno	Mexico	5.0	24.6	5.0	24.7	59.3	48.1	107.4
12	Diego Lequerica	Peru	9.7	25.0	5.0	25.0	64.7	36	100.7
13	Benjamín Ayala	Chile	9.9	24.9	4.8	25.0	64.6	36.1	100.7
14	Lautaro Soria	Argentina	9.8	24.8	4.9	24.9	64.4	33.1	97.5
15	Mateus Bellotto	Brazil	9.9	9.9	9.3	25.0	54.1	36.1	90.2
16	Rodrigo Hanada	Brazil	10.0	24.6	4.9	10.0	49.5	33.1	82.6
17	Héctor López	Mexico	5.0	9.7	4.9	25.0	44.6	30.1	74.7
18	Alejo Suter	Argentina	9.8	5.0	0	25.0	39.8	33	72.8
19	Gianstefano Di Nino	Venezuela	5.0	24.5	9.4	10.0	48.9	22.1	71
20	Luis Castellanos	Venezuela	9.7	5.0	4.9	9.9	29.5	14.1	43.6

=== Final ===
Rank	Climber	Nation	Boulder					Lead	Total
Rank	Climber	Nation	1	2	3	4	Total	Lead	Total
1st place, gold medalist(s)	Jesse Grupper	United States	9.7	25.0	24.7	10.0	69.4	92.1	161.5
2nd place, silver medalist(s)	Sean Bailey	United States	24.6	25.0	25.0	9.9	84.5	57.1	141.5
3rd place, bronze medalist(s)	Zachary Galla	United States	24.7	25.0	25.0	9.7	84.4	54.1	138.5
4	Sean McColl	Canada	24.8	25.0	24.7	10.0	84.5	48.1	132.6
5	Oscar Baudrand	Canada	24.8	9.9	24.7	9.9	69.3	18.1	87.4
6	Victor Baudrand	Canada	10.0	10.0	10.0	5.0	35.0	48.1	83.1
7	Benjamín Vargas	Chile	10.0	9.9	10.0	10.0	39.9	18.1	58.0
8	Thor Villegas	Mexico	10.0	10.0	5.0	10.0	35.0	18.1	53.1
