= Sean Bailey (climber) =

American rock climber (born 1996)

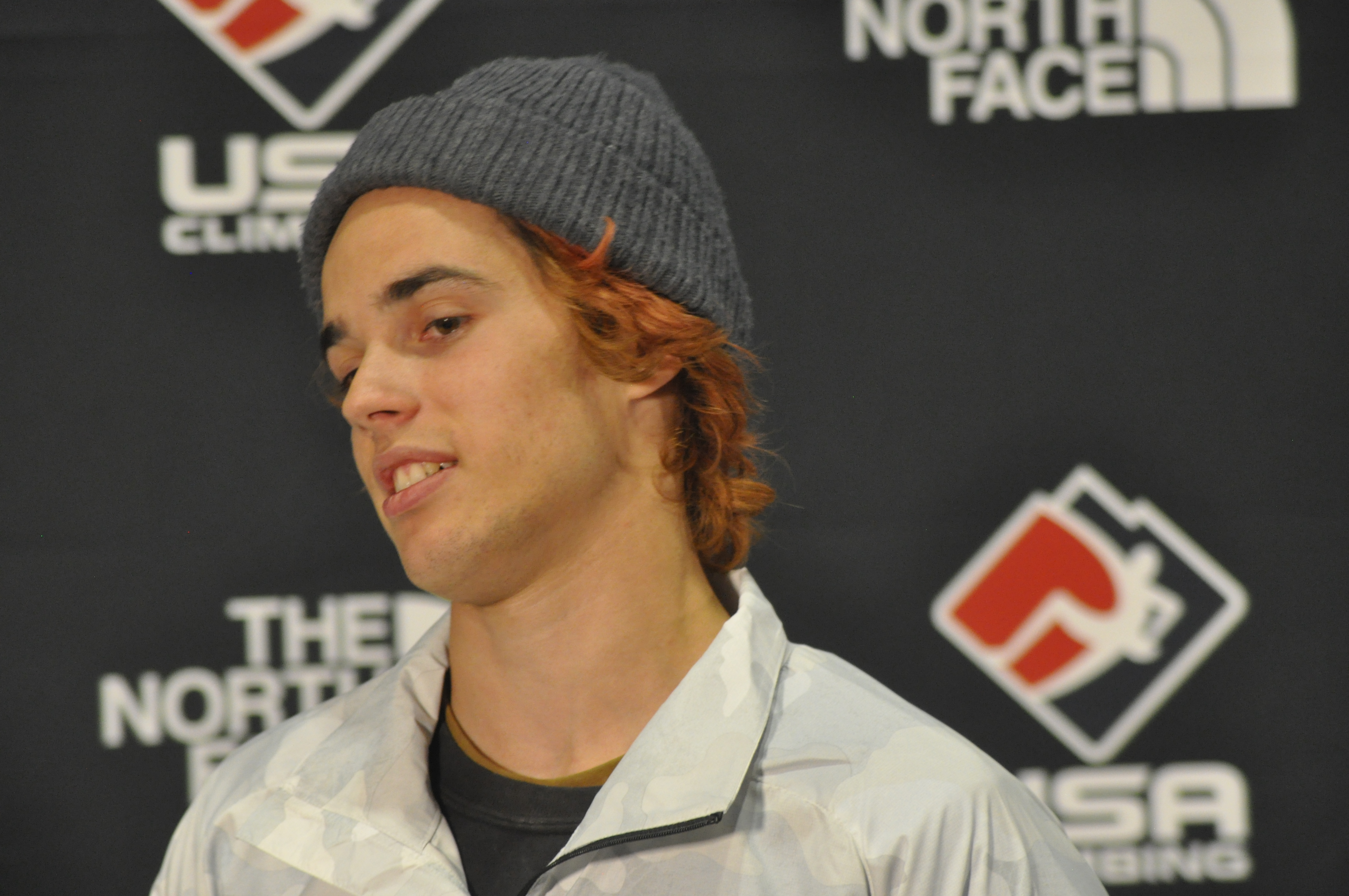
- Bailey in 2019

Personal information
- Born: May 20, 1996 (age 30) Shoreline, Washington, U.S.
- Height: 163 cm (5 ft 4 in)

Climbing career
- Type of climber: Competition climbing; Bouldering; Sport climbing
- Highest grade: Redpoint: 5.15d (9c); Bouldering: V17 (9A)
Medal record
Event / 1st / 2nd / 3rd; World Cup / 3 / 1 / 1
Men's competition climbing
Representing United States
World Cup
Gold medal – first place	2021 Salt Lake City	Bouldering
Gold medal – first place	2021 Villars	Lead
Gold medal – first place	2021 Chamonix	Lead
Silver medal – second place	2018 Vail	Bouldering
Bronze medal – third place	2022 Chamonix	Lead
Pan American Games
Silver medal – second place	2023 Santiago	Bouldering & Lead

Sean Bailey (born May 20, 1996) is an American professional rock climber, who specializes in competition climbing, sport climbing, and bouldering. He has represented the United States in the IFSC Climbing World Cup in lead climbing, and has two podium finishes in bouldering at individual legs of the World Cup, including a win at the Salt Lake City leg of the 2021 World Cup.1 and three in lead climbing, including two gold medals, at the Villars leg, and Chamonix leg, in July 2021.

== Early life and youth competitions ==
Bailey was born in Shoreline, Washington and began climbing at age 5 with parents, who were both climbers. He began competing with the youth team at the Vertical World climbing gym and won the USA Climbing Sport Climbing Series Youth National Championship at age 17.

== Climbing career ==
=== Competition climbing ===
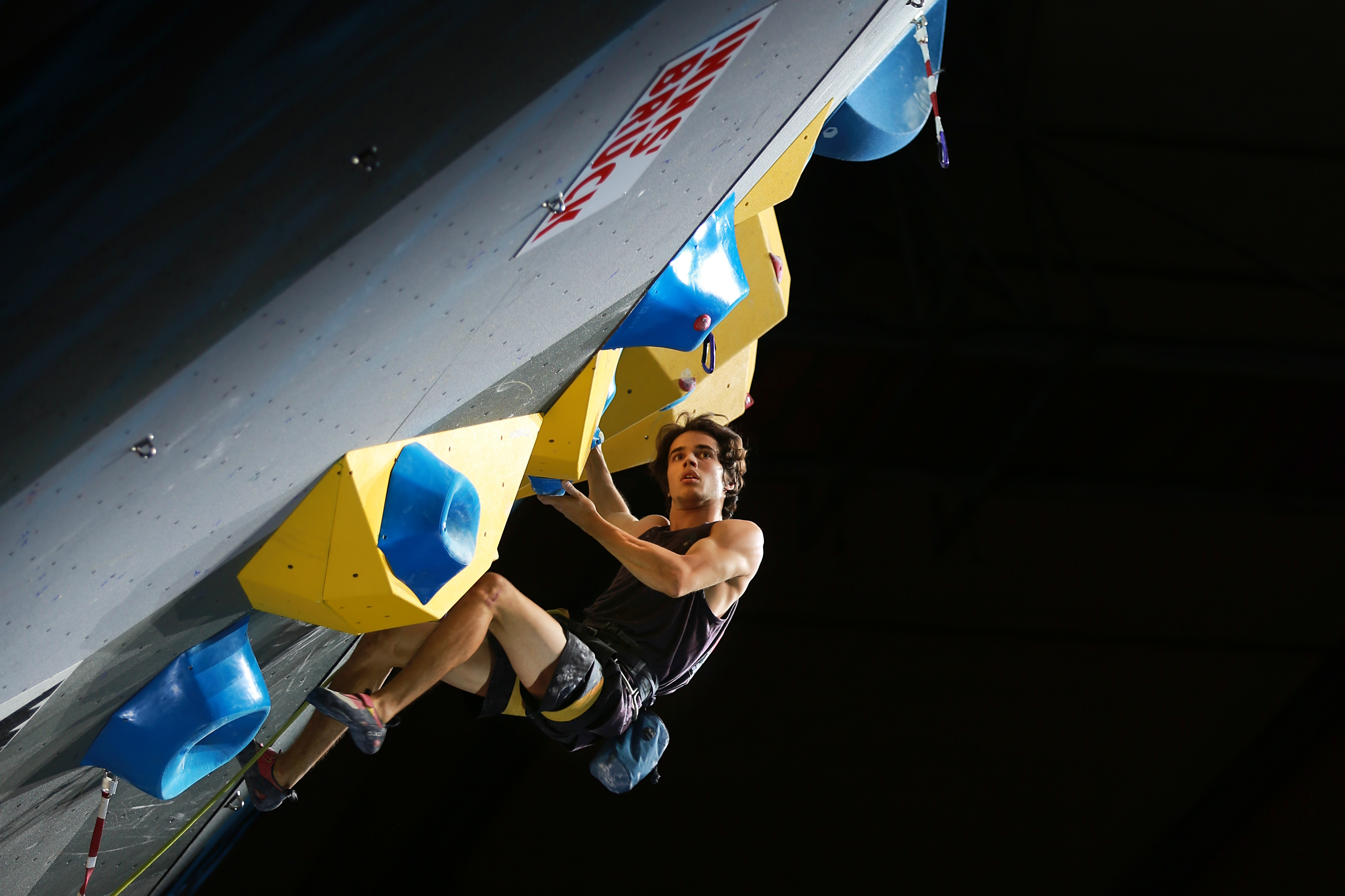
Bailey at the 2018 IFSC Climbing World Championships in Innsbruck

At age 17, Bailey won the 2013 American Bouldering Series, the senior national bouldering competition series in the United States.

Bailey has five IFSC World Cup podium finishes, first place in boulders at Salt Lake City in 2021 and in lead at Villars and Chamonix in 2021, and second place at Vail in 2018. Bailey finished the Lead World Cup season in second place overall. In July 2022, he made his first podium finish of the 2022 IFSC Climbing World Cup series with a bronze medal in lead at Chamonix.

In 2019, Bailey finished ninth at the Olympic qualifying event in Toulouse, one place short of securing a spot at the 2020 Summer Olympics, and finished fourth at the 2020 IFSC Pan-American Continental Championships in March 2020, missing a place at the 2020 Olympics at his final opportunity. In October 2023, He again came within one place of qualifying for the 2024 Olympics, finishing second at the 2023 Pan-American Games to Jesse Grupper, who took the second and last spot for American men in the boulder and lead combined category.

Bailey also won the USA Climbing Lead National Championship (formerly USA Climbing Sport and Speed Nationals) in 2016, 2018 and 2022, and the 2019 Bouldering Nationals.

==== World Cup rankings ====
Discipline	2016	2017	2018	2019	2021	2022	2023
Bouldering	—N/a	32	22	39	4	18	19
Lead	17	12	18	9	2	11	30
Combined	—N/a	25	—N/a	25	—N/a	—N/a	—N/a

=== Sport climbing ===
In June 2016, Bailey sent Chris Sharma's Realization/Biographie, a 5.15a (9a+) route in Céüse, France. He sent another 5.15a in March 2019, Joe Mama in Oliana, Spain.

In September 2021, Bailey sent Bibliographie, a 5.15c (9b+) route just a few meters from his previous project, Biographie, in Céüse. The route was first climbed by Alex Megos in 2020 and was repeated by Stefano Ghisolfi earlier in 2021.

In March 2025, Bailey made the first free ascent of Duality of Man, an extension to the 5.14c (8c+) Lee Majors in Dry Canyon, Arizona, first sent by Nathaniel Coleman in 2018. He proposed a 5.15d (9c) grade, which would make Duality one of only four climbing routes ever climbed at this grade if confirmed, and the first-ever in North America. Bailey began attempting the route in late 2021, taking more than three years to complete it, and did not publicize the ascent until January 2026, almost 11 months after the fact, to time the announcement with the release of the film documenting the climb.

=== Bouldering ===
In October and November 2020, he sent two V16 (8C+) boulders: Box Therapy in Rocky Mountain National Park, Colorado (downgraded to V15 by Brooke Raboutou in 2023), and Grand Illusion in Little Cottonwood Canyon, Utah. Earlier that year, Bailey sent his first V15 (8C) boulder, Pegasus in Joe's Valley, Utah.

In 2024, Bailey made the first ascent of Shaolin V17 (9A), in Red Rock Canyon, Nevada. The ascent was his first of the grade and the third V17 in the United States, after Daniel Woods' Return of the Sleepwalker and Shawn Raboutou’s Megatron.

== Notable ascents ==
=== Boulder problems ===
9A (V17):

- Arrival of the Birds - Chironico (SUI) - November 2025 - Second ascent.
- Alphane - Chironico (SUI) - December 2024.
- Shaolin - Red Rock Canyon (USA) - February 2024 - First ascent.

8C+ (V16):

- Floatin - Mizugaki (JPN) - October 2024 - Fourth ascent.
- Devilution - Bishop (USA) - January 2024 - First ascent.
- Grand Illusion - Little Cottonwood Canyon (USA) - November 2020 - Second ascent.

8C (V15):

- From Dirt Grows the Flowers - Chironico (SUI) - October 2025
- Eye in the Sky - Val Bavona (SUI) - March 2024.
- The Doors of Perception - Little Cottonwood Canyon (USA) - December 2023 - First ascent.
- Lucid Dreaming - Bishop (USA) - December 2023.
- Pegasus - Joe's Valley (USA) - November 2020 - Second ascent.
- Box Therapy - Rocky Mountain National Park (USA) - October 2020 - Third ascent.

=== Redpointed routes ===
5.15d (9c)

- Duality of Man - Dry Canyon (USA) - March 2025 - First ascent.

5.15c (9b+)

- Bibliographie - Céüse (FRA) - September 2021 - Third ascent.

5.15a (9a+)

- Joe Mama - Oliana (ESP) - March 2019.
- First Ley - Margalef (ESP) - December 2018.
- Realization/Biographie - Céüse (FRA) - August 2016.
