= Sport climbing at the 2023 Pan American Games – Women's boulder & lead =

Women's boulder & lead at the 2023 Pan American Games
- Venue: Cerrillos Park Climbing Walls
- Dates: October 22 - October 24
- Competitors: 20 from 9 nations
- Winning score: 172.4

Medalists
Gold medal	Natalia Grossman	United States
Silver medal	Brooke Raboutou	United States
Bronze medal	Alannah Yip	Canada

The women's combined competition lead climbing & competition bouldering event as the 2023 Pan American Games was held from October 22 to 24 at the Cerrillos Park Climbing Walls in Santiago, Chile.

== Schedule ==
Date	Time	Round
October 22, 2023	10:00	Semifinals - Boulder Stage
October 22, 2023	13:30	Semifinals - Lead Stage
October 24, 2023	18:05	Finals - Boulder Stage
October 24, 2023	20:12	Finals - Lead Stage

== Results ==
=== Semifinals ===
The highest eight scores advance to the finals.

Rank	Climber	Nation	Boulder					Lead	Total
Rank	Climber	Nation	1	2	3	4	Total	Lead	Total
1	Brooke Raboutou	United States	25.0	24.9	25.0	25.0	99.9	76.1	176
2	Natalia Grossman	United States	25.0	24.8	25.0	25.0	99.8	76.1	175.9
3	Alannah Yip	Canada	25.0	24.7	25.0	25.0	99.7	48.1	175.8
4	Anastasia Sanders	United States	25.0	25.0	10.0	25.0	85.0	30.1	115.1
5	Alejandra Contreras	Chile	24.9	9.9	10.0	25.0	69.8	33.1	102.9
6	Indiana Chapman	Canada	24.5	9.8	5.0	25.0	64.3	30.1	94.4
7	Valentina Aguado	Argentina	24.7	9.9	5.0	25.0	64.6	26.1	90.7
7	Rebecca Frangos	Canada	24.9	4.9	9.9	24.9	64.6	26.1	90.7
9	Lianet Castillo	Venezuela	24.8	9.8	5.0	24.9	64.5	26.1	90.6
10	Arantza Luna	Mexico	24.8	9.6	9.8	25.0	69.2	20.1	89.3
11	Zoe García	Argentina	24.8	4.9	5.0	24.9	59.6	22	81.6
11	Martina Castro	Chile	24.8	4.9	4.9	24.9	59.5	22.1	81.6
13	Ignacia Mellado	Chile	9.9	4.9	10.0	25.0	49.8	28	77.8
14	Anja Koehler	Brazil	10.0	9.6	5.0	25.0	49.6	26.1	75.7
15	Bianca Castro	Brazil	9.5	4.9	5.0	25.0	44.4	26.1	70.5
16	Mariana Hanggi	Brazil	24.7	9.7	5.0	10.0	49.4	12.1	61.5
17	Rocío Becerra	Argentina	0	4.7	10.0	9.9	24.6	26.1	50.7
18	María Fernanda González	Mexico	5.0	9.2	5.0	10.0	29.2	14.1	43.3
19	Elizabeth Sepúlveda	Puerto Rico	4.5	5.0	5.0	10.0	24.5	26.1	50.6
20	Sofía Herrera	Peru	0	4.6	4.7	4.6	13.9	9.1	23

=== Final ===
Rank	Climber	Nation	Boulder					Lead	Total
Rank	Climber	Nation	1	2	3	4	Total	Lead	Total
1st place, gold medalist(s)	Natalia Grossman	United States	24.9	25.0	25.0	9.4	84.3	88.1	172.4
2nd place, silver medalist(s)	Brooke Raboutou	United States	9.7	25.0	25.0	9.7	69.4	96	165.4
3rd place, bronze medalist(s)	Alannah Yip	Canada	24.9	24.9	5.0	9.9	64.7	64	128.7
4	Anastasia Sanders	United States	9.5	24.8	4.7	0	39.0	76.1	115.1
5	Alejandra Contreras	Chile	9.6	24.9	0	0	34.5	57	91.5
6	Valentina Aguado	Argentina	4.9	25.0	4.9	0	34.8	54	88.8
7	Rebecca Frangos	Canada	4.5	24.8	0	0	29.3	57.1	86.4
8	Indiana Chapman	Canada	5.0	24.8	4.9	0	34.7	51.1	85.8
