= 2021 IFSC Climbing World Championships =

Biennial competition climbing event

2021 World Championships
- Venue: Irina Viner-Usmanova Gymnastics Palace and CSKA Universal Sports Hall
- Location: Moscow, Russia
- Dates: 16–21 September 2021
- Competitors: 302 from 41 nations

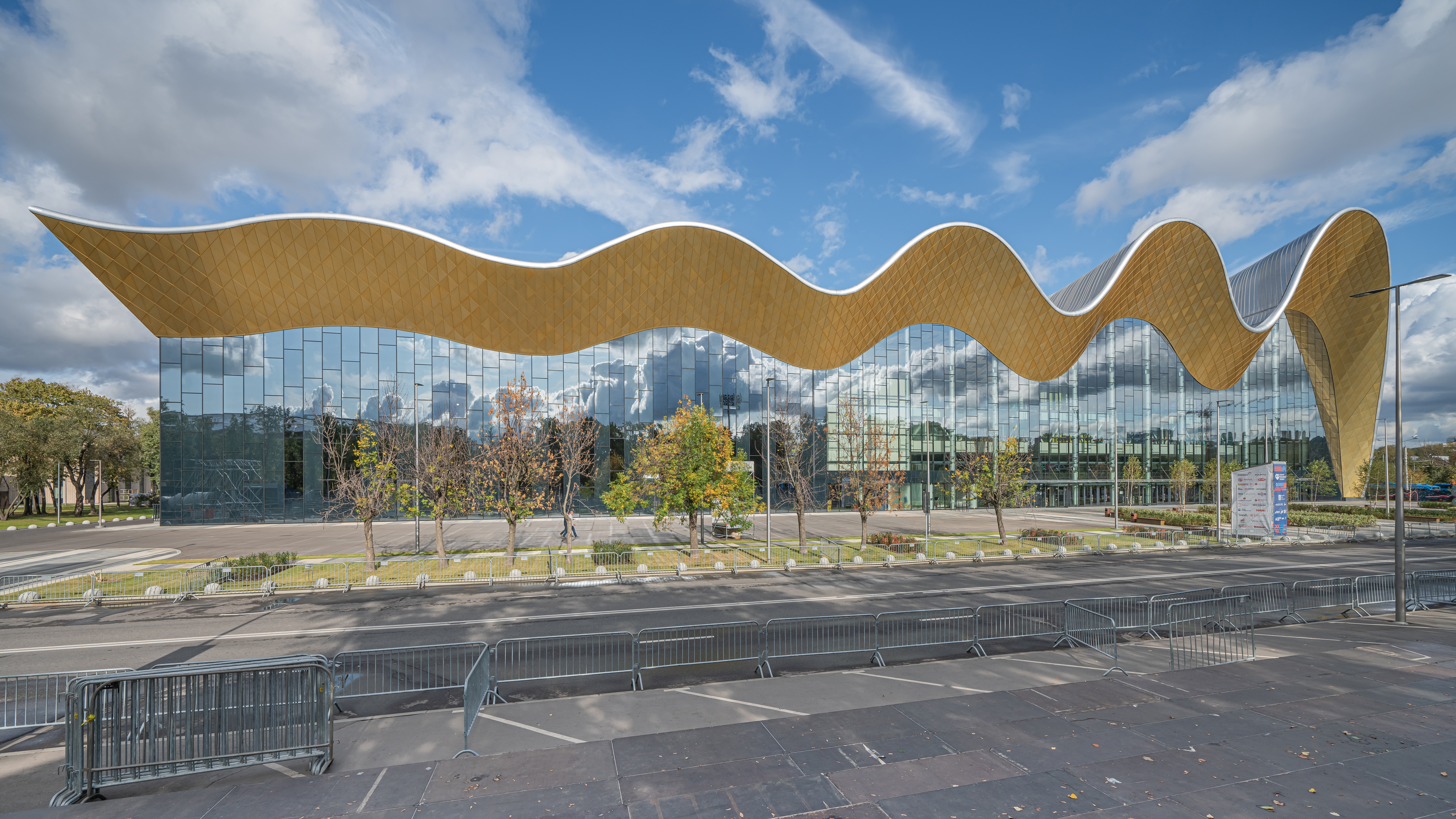
Irina Viner-Usmanova Gymnastics Palace, venue for the final rounds of all three disciplines

The 2021 IFSC Climbing World Championships was the 17th edition of the competition climbing event. It was held in Moscow, Russia from 16 to 21 September 2021, alongside the 2021 IFSC Paraclimbing World Championships.

Although the World Anti-Doping Agency (WADA) had banned Russia from hosting or bidding for a world championship event in any sport until December 2022 due to several doping violations, the IFSC announced in February 2021 that the event would remain in Russia, echoing the Court of Arbitration for Sport's ruling that events had to be reassigned "unless it is legally or practically impossible to do so."

Two venues were used during the championships: the Irina Viner-Usmanova Gymnastics Palace and the CSKA Universal Sports Hall.

== Medalists ==
Event	Gold	Silver	Bronze
Men's Lead	Jakob Schubert (AUT)	Luka Potočar (SLO)	Hamish McArthur (GBR)
Men's Bouldering	Kokoro Fujii (JPN)	Tomoa Narasaki (JPN)	Manuel Cornu (FRA)
Men's Speed	Danyil Boldyrev (UKR)	Erik Noya Cardona (ESP)	Noah Bratschi (USA)
Men's Combined	Yannick Flohé (GER)	Philipp Martin (GER)	Fedir Samoilov (UKR)
Women's Lead	Seo Chae-hyun (KOR)	Natalia Grossman (USA)	Laura Rogora (ITA)
Women's Bouldering	Natalia Grossman (USA)	Camilla Moroni (ITA)	Staša Gejo (SRB)
Women's Speed	Natalia Kałucka (POL)	Iuliia Kaplina (CFR) (Note: Results of Russian athletes are credited to the Climbing Federation of Russia (CFR).)	Aleksandra Mirosław (POL)
Women's Combined	Jessica Pilz (AUT)	Mia Krampl (SLO)	Elnaz Rekabi (IRI)

== Medal table ==
* Host nation ( Climbing Federation of Russia)

Rank	Nation	Gold	Silver	Bronze	Total
1	Austria	2	0	0	2
2	United States	1	1	1	3
3	Germany	1	1	0	2
3	Japan	1	1	0	2
5	Poland	1	0	1	2
5	Ukraine	1	0	1	2
7	South Korea	1	0	0	1
8	Slovenia	0	2	0	2
9	Italy	0	1	1	2
10	Climbing Federation of Russia*	0	1	0	1
10	Spain	0	1	0	1
12	France	0	0	1	1
12	Great Britain	0	0	1	1
12	Iran	0	0	1	1
12	Serbia	0	0	1	1
Totals (15 entries)		8	8	8	24

== Broadcast incident ==
On 18 September, the IFSC issued an apology after broadcasters showed a close-up of chalk handprints on Austrian climber Joanna Färber's bottom during the women's bouldering semi-finals in the event live feed. The federation removed the feed from its YouTube channel and re-uploaded an edited video without the footage it described as "objectification of the human body." This incident marked the second time in the season that the IFSC apologised for sexualised imagery, after a similar footage of Färber appeared on the live feed of the Innsbruck World Cup in June 2021.

== Schedule ==
All times and dates use Moscow Time (UTC+3:00)

Q	Qualifications	SF	Semi-finals	F	Finals

B	Bouldering	L	Lead	S	Speed

September 2021	16th Thu		17th Fri	18th Sat		19th Sun		20th Mon	21st Tue	
Men	S	S	B			B	B	L	L	L
Women	S	S	B	B	B			L	L	L

== Lead ==
=== Men ===
Rank	Name	Qualification					Semi-Final	Final
Rank	Name	Route 1		Route 2		Points	Semi-Final	Final
Rank	Name	Score	Rank	Score	Rank	Points	Semi-Final	Final
1	(Austria) Jakob Schubert	38	3	33+	5	4.69	40+	TOP
2	(Slovenia) Luka Potočar	36+	8	29+	9	9.25	40+	TOP
3	(United Kingdom) Hamish McArthur	38	3	33+	5	3.32	TOP	46+
4	(Czech Republic) Martin Stráník	36+	8	28	18	13.44	40+	46
5	(Japan) Tomoa Narasaki	37+	6	36+	1	2.55	38	46
6	(Germany) Sebastian Halenke	36	12	30	8	10.39	40	44+
7	(Japan) Yoshiyuki Ogata	36+	8	35	2	4.87	37+	44+
8	(Italy) Stefano Ghisolfi	36	12	26	29	19.79	40	34+

=== Women ===
Rank	Name	Qualification					Semi-Final	Final
Rank	Name	Route 1		Route 2		Points	Semi-Final	Final
Rank	Name	Score	Rank	Score	Rank	Points	Semi-Final	Final
1	(South Korea) Seo Chae-hyun	TOP	1	TOP	1	1.73	TOP	TOP
2	(United States) Natalia Grossman	TOP	1	41	4	2.45	TOP	37 (4:22)
3	(Italy) Laura Rogora	44	3	TOP	1	2.45	TOP	37 (5:01)
4	(Austria) Jessica Pilz	36+	9	37+	17	13.44	41+	36+
5	(United States) Brooke Raboutou	37+	5	40+	5	5.48	39+	35+
6	(Japan) Natsuki Tanii	42	19	38+	14	26.52	41+	32+
7	Dinara Fakhritdinova	37+	5	39+	6	7.55	39+	32+
8	(France) Salomé Romain	34+	13	37+	17	16.88	40	25+

== Bouldering ==
=== Men ===
Rank	Name	Qualification	Semi-Final	Final
1	(Japan) Kokoro Fujii	5t5z 9 6	2t4z 3 12	4t4z 6 6
2	(Japan) Tomoa Narasaki	4t45z 8 6	3t3z 7 5	3t3z 6 6
3	(France) Manuel Cornu	4t5z 13 11	3t3z 8 5	2t3z 2 3
4	Aleksey Rubtsov	3t5z 6 7	2t3z 9 6	2t3z 7 5
5	(Israel) Nimrod Marcus	3t4z 10 11	2t3z 3 5	0t2z 0 9
6	(Slovenia) Anže Peharc	4t5z 11 8	2t3z 7 7	0t2z 0 10

=== Women ===
Rank	Name	Qualification	Semi-Final	Final
1	(United States) Natalia Grossman	4t5z 8 11	4t4z 8 8	4t4z 7 7
2	(Italy) Camilla Moroni	3t4z 7 14	4t4z 15 13	4t4z 13 11
3	(Serbia) Staša Gejo	4t4z 11 6	2t4z 4 9	2t4z 5 7
4	Elena Krasovskaia	4t5z 8 8	3t4z 8 9	2t3z 2 4
5	(United States) Brooke Raboutou	5t5z 8 6	3t3z 11 11	2t3z 3 4
6	(Switzerland) Andrea Kümin	3t5z 5 8	3t3z 11 9	1t3z 3 3

== Speed ==
=== Men ===
Final bracket

Round of 16
1 (Poland) Marcin Dzieński	5.83
16 (Kazakhstan) Rishat Khaibullin	5.76
8 (Ukraine) Danyil Boldyrev	5.844
9 (Italy) Gian Luca Zodda	5.849
4 (United States) John Brosler	5.72
13 Aleksandr Shikov	Fall
5 Arsenii Bogomolov	6.07
12 (France) Guillaume Moro	5.75
2 Dmitrii Timofeev	Fall
15 (Austria) Tobias Plangger	6.01
7 (Iran) Reza Alipour	5.75
10 (Spain) Erik Noya Cardona	5.70
3 Vladislav Deulin	6.06
14 (France) Pierre Rebreyend	6.17
6 (United States) Noah Bratschi	5.77
11 (Kazakhstan) Amir Maimuratov	5.91

Quarterfinals
(Kazakhstan) Rishat Khaibullin	Fall
(Ukraine) Danyil Boldyrev	5.80
(United States) John Brosler	Fall
(France) Guillaume Moro	7.76
(Austria) Tobias Plangger	5.98
(Spain) Erik Noya Cardona	5.87
Vladislav Deulin	Fall
(United States) Noah Bratschi	5.84

Semifinals
(Ukraine) Danyil Boldyrev	6.14
(France) Guillaume Moro	6.47
(Spain) Erik Noya Cardona	5.74
(United States) Noah Bratschi	6.06

Final
(Ukraine) Danyil Boldyrev	5.73
(Spain) Erik Noya Cardona	5.95
Third place
(France) Guillaume Moro	8.46
(United States) Noah Bratschi	6.31

=== Women ===
Final bracket

Round of 16
1 (Poland) Aleksandra Mirosław	7.37
16 (Austria) Laura Stöckler	12.37
8 (France) Capucine Viglione	7.67
9 (Poland) Patrycja Chudziak	7.72
4 (Poland) Natalia Kałucka	7.44
13 (Poland) Aleksandra Kałucka	7.87
5 Elizaveta Ivanova	7.69
12 (Italy) Beatrice Colli	8.13
2 Iuliia Kaplina	7.31
15 (Germany) Franziska Ritter	8.06
7 (Poland) Anna Brozek	7.73
10 Mariia Krasavina	8.17
3 (United States) Emma Hunt	9.29
14 (Ukraine) Yelyzaveta Lavrykova	Fall
6 Ekaterina Barashchuk	7.58
11 (Ecuador) Andrea Rojas	8.16

Quarterfinals
(Poland) Aleksandra Mirosław	7.10
(France) Capucine Viglione	7.55
(Poland) Natalia Kałucka	7.15
Elizaveta Ivanova	7.30
Iuliia Kaplina	7.60
(Poland) Anna Brozek	Fall
(United States) Emma Hunt	9.41
Ekaterina Barashchuk	7.61

Semifinals
(Poland) Aleksandra Mirosław	Fall
(Poland) Natalia Kałucka	7.07
Iuliia Kaplina	7.09
Ekaterina Barashchuk	8.89

Final
(Poland) Natalia Kałucka	7.18
Iuliia Kaplina	8.94
Third place
(Poland) Aleksandra Mirosław	7.00
Ekaterina Barashchuk	8.47

== Combined ==
=== Men ===
Rank	Name	Lead		Bouldering		Speed		Total
Rank	Name	Rank	Pts	Rank	Pts	Rank	Pts	Total
1st place, gold medalist(s)	(Germany) Yannick Flohé	9	1	15	1	42	9	9.0
2nd place, silver medalist(s)	(Germany) Philipp Martin	22	3	23	2	41	8	48.0
3rd place, bronze medalist(s)	(Ukraine) Fedir Samoilov	19	2	41	3	43	10	60.0
4	(Germany) Jan Hojer	32	4	43	4	32	4	64.0
5	(Ecuador) Carlos Granja	60	5	69	7	19	2	70.0
6	(Ukraine) Kostiantyn Pavlenko	89	9	85	10	17	1	90.0
7	(Chinese Taipei) Lin Chia-hsiang	72	7	55	6	37	6	252.0
8	(Ukraine) Sergii Topishko	65	6	47	5	48	15	450.0
9	(Ecuador) Nickolaie Rivadeneira	91	10	85	10	34	5	500.0
10	(Ukraine) Yaroslav Tkach	96	14	94	13	30	3	546.0
11	(Ecuador) Aaron Peñaranda	83	8	85	10	39	7	560.0
12	(India) Gaurav Kumar	93	11.5	85	10	46	13	1495.0
13	(Turkey) Ferhat Bekmez	97	15	85	10	44	11	1650.0
14	(South Africa) Joshua Bruyns	93	11.5	96	14	45	12	1932.0
15	(Turkey) Timur Taş	95	13	97	15	47	14	2730.0

=== Women ===
Rank	Name	Lead		Bouldering		Speed		Total
Rank	Name	Rank	Pts	Rank	Pts	Rank	Pts	Total
1st place, gold medalist(s)	(Austria) Jessica Pilz	4	1	35	5	24	4	20.0
2nd place, silver medalist(s)	(Slovenia) Mia Krampl	19	3	29	4	23	3	36.0
3rd place, bronze medalist(s)	(Iran) Elnaz Rekabi	35	7	18	1	27	6	42.0
4	(Kazakhstan) Tamara Ulzhabayeva	61	10	43	7.5	18	1	75.0
5	(Germany) Hannah Meul	22	4	23	2.5	33	9	90.0
6	(Germany) Roxana Wienand	31	5	23	2.5	30	8	100.0
7	(Ukraine) Ievgeniia Kazbekova	17	2	37	6	36	11	132.0
8	(Ukraine) Tetiana Kolkotina	69	11	73	11	20	2	242.0
9	(Iran) Mahya Darabian	50	8	49	9	25	5	360.0
10	(Ukraine) Margaryta Zakharova	57	9	43	7.5	28	7	472.5
11	(Ukraine) Nika Potapova	33	6	63	10	35	10	600.0

== See also ==
- 2021 IFSC Paraclimbing World Championships
- 2021 IFSC Climbing World Cup
- Sport climbing at the 2020 Summer Olympics
