= 2021 IFSC Climbing World Cup =

International sport climbing competition

- Organiser: IFSC
- Edition: 33rd
- Events: 11: 4 Boulder 5 Lead 2 Speed
- Locations: 8: Meiringen, Switzerland Salt Lake City, United States Innsbruck, Austria Villars, Switzerland Chamonix, France Briançon, France Kranj, Slovenia
- Dates: 16 April – 4 September 2021

Lead
- Men: (Italy) Stefano Ghisolfi
- Women: (Slovenia) Janja Garnbret
- Team: Slovenia

Boulder
- Men: (Japan) Yoshiyuki Ogata
- Women: (United States) Natalia Grossman
- Team: Japan

Speed
- Men: (Indonesia) Veddriq Leonardo
- Women: (United States) Emma Hunt
- Team: Indonesia

The 2021 IFSC Climbing World Cup was the 33rd edition of the international sport climbing competition series, held in seven locations. There are 11 events: four bouldering, five lead, and two speed events. The season began on 16 April in Meiringen, Switzerland with the first bouldering competition in the season, and concluded on 4 September in Kranj, Slovenia. The International Federation of Sport Climbing had initially scheduled 18 events concluding on 31 October, but COVID-19 travel restrictions resulted in the cancellation of events in Xiamen and Wujiang in China, Jakarta in Indonesia and Seoul in South Korea.

This season was the first completed IFSC Climbing World Cup series since the 2019 edition, as the 2020 IFSC Climbing World Cup was limited to just one event, the Briançon Lead World Cup in August 2020, due to the pandemic. The opening event in Meiringen was the first Boulder World Cup since the 2019 season. The Boulder World Cup and the Boulder and Speed World Cup scheduled for 21–22 May and 28–30 May, respectively, in Salt Lake City, United States, were the first-ever consecutive IFSC World Cups held in the same city.

The top 3 in each competition receive medals, and the overall winners are awarded trophies. At the end of the season an overall ranking is determined based upon points, which athletes are awarded for finishing in the top 30 of each individual event.

== Season winners ==
Event	First		Second		Third	
Men's Lead	(Italy) Stefano Ghisolfi	319 points	(United States) Sean Bailey	277 points	(Japan) Masahiro Higuchi	263 points
Women's Lead	(Slovenia) Janja Garnbret	300 points	(United States) Natalia Grossman	296 points	(Italy) Laura Rogora	278 points
Men's Bouldering	(Japan) Yoshiyuki Ogata	255 points	(Japan) Kokoro Fujii	255 points	(Czech Republic) Adam Ondra	200 points
Women's Bouldering	(United States) Natalia Grossman	345 points	(Slovenia) Janja Garnbret	280 points	(France) Oriane Bertone	235 points
Men's Speed	(Indonesia) Veddriq Leonardo	200 points	(Indonesia) Kiromal Katibin	145 points	(Poland) Marcin Dzieński	96 points
Women's Speed	(United States) Emma Hunt	131 points	(Poland) Patrycja Chudziak	120 points	(Poland) Aleksandra Mirosław (Russia) Ekaterina Barashchuk	100 points

== Scheduling ==
In December 2020, the IFSC moved the 21–22 May Boulder World Cup from Munich, Germany to Salt Lake City, United States, and rescheduled the already existing Boulder & Speed World Cup in Salt Lake City from 11 to 13 June to 28–30 May, in order to minimize travel for athletes and staff. In March, the federation also moved the Seoul, South Korea and Wujiang, China World Cups from April and May to October because of ongoing COVID-19 related restrictions in the respective countries. In July, the Lead World Cup in Ljubljana, Slovenia was moved to Kranj, Slovenia, and rescheduled from 4–5 to 3–4 September.

In August, the federation cancelled the World Cups in China: the 15–17 October Lead & Speed World Cup in Xiamen and the 22–24 October Boulder & Speed World Cup in Wujiang. In September, the federation also cancelled the 30–31 October Speed World Cup in Jakarta, Indonesia, which had already been postponed from 23 to 24 October. The following week, the IFSC also cancelled the Boulder and Speed World Cup in Seoul, originally scheduled for May and pushed back to October, due to rising COVID-19 cases in South Korea. The cancellation of the Jakarta and Seoul World Cups mean the bouldering and speed seasons concluded in June in Innsbruck and Villars in July, respectively.

== Competition highlights ==
Because of the cancellations caused by the COVID-19 pandemic, the opening World Cup event of 2021 Meiringen held 16–17 April 2021, was the first Boulder World Cup in 22 months, since Vail, Colorado in September 2019., and the first Climbing World Cup of any discipline since August 2020 in Briançon. Adam Ondra won the men's gold, his 20th career World Cup medal, with 3 tops in the final. On the women's side, Slovenia's Janja Garnbret continued her winning run from her unbeaten 2019 bouldering campaign, winning the competition by topping all boulders with just four falls while 16-year-old French climber Oriane Bertone made her senior competition debut with a second-place finish behind Garnbret.

Garnbret did not participate in the first of two World Cups in Salt Lake City held 21–22 May, bringing her streak of seven Boulder World Cup wins to an end. In her absence, Grossman won the gold, followed by Bertone, who again finished second, while Ondra repeated as the men's Boulder winner. Grossman repeated as the winner in the second Salt Lake City event, held 28–30 May, this time becoming the first woman to defeat Garnbret, who finished second, since April 2018. In the men's speed competition, Kiromal Katibin of Indonesia set a world record time of 5.258 seconds in qualifying, a record that was broken the same day by fellow Indonesian, Veddriq Leonardo, who hit the buzzer at 5.20 in the final run against Katibin.

Garnbret won all three Lead World Cups she entered in 2021, winning a record 31st World Cup gold medal in Kranj in September and taking the overall season title. On the men's side, Stefano Ghisolfi took the Lead season title, having won the event in Briançon in addition to two second places at the World Cups in Innsbruck and Chamonix, while Sean Bailey's two wins in Villars and Chamonix earned him second place in the overall Lead season ranking.

== Broadcast incident ==
Austrian broadcaster Osterreichischer Rundfunk (ORF) issued an apology during the Innsbruck World Cup, after showing slow-motion, close-up footage that zoomed on the chalk handprints on Johanna Färber's bottom on the event's live feed on YouTube. IFSC removed the video from its YouTube channel and replaced it a version without the footage. Färber later posted a message on her Instagram, calling the incident "disrespectful and upsetting"

== Overview ==
No.	Location	D	G	Gold		Silver		Bronze	
1	(Switzerland) Meiringen, Switzerland; April, 16–18	B	M	(Czech Republic) Adam Ondra	3T3z 10 7	(Japan) Yoshiyuki Ogata	2T4z 7 9	(Japan) Tomoaki Takata	1T4z 4 12
1	(Switzerland) Meiringen, Switzerland; April, 16–18	B	W	(Slovenia) Janja Garnbret	4T4z 7 6	(France) Oriane Bertone	2T4z 8 10	(United States) Natalia Grossman	2T4z 10 10
2	(United States) Salt Lake City, United States; May, 21-22 (Note: Originally scheduled to be held in Munich, Germany.)	B	M	(Czech Republic) Adam Ondra	4T4z 8 7	(France) Mejdi Schalck	3T4z 4 5	(Austria) Jakob Schubert	3T3z 4 4
2	(United States) Salt Lake City, United States; May, 21-22	B	W	(United States) Natalia Grossman	4T4z 15 14	(France) Oriane Bertone	3T4z 7 7	(United States) Brooke Raboutou	3T3z 4 3
3	(United States) Salt Lake City, United States; May, 28–30 (Note: Moved from 11–13 June.)	B	M	(United States) Sean Bailey	2T4z 9 11	(Japan) Kokoro Fujii	1T4z 9 12	(Japan) Tomoa Narasaki	1T3z 1 3
3	(United States) Salt Lake City, United States; May, 28–30	B	W	(United States) Natalia Grossman	4T4z 4 4	(Slovenia) Janja Garnbret	4T4z 6 6	(United States) Brooke Raboutou	3T4z 5 8
3	(United States) Salt Lake City, United States; May, 28–30	S	M	(Indonesia) Veddriq Leonardo	5.208	(Indonesia) Kiromal Katibin	fall	(Poland) Marcin Dzieński	5.842
3	(United States) Salt Lake City, United States; May, 28–30	S	W	(Poland) Aleksandra Mirosław	7.382	(United States) Emma Hunt	7.539	(Japan) Miho Nonaka	8.958
4	(Austria) Innsbruck, Austria; June, 23–26 (Note: Boulder finals suspended after three problems because of rainstorm.)	B	M	(Japan) Yoshiyuki Ogata	2T2z 7 7	(Japan) Tomoa Narasaki	1T3z 2 11	(Japan) Kokoro Fujii	1T1z 2 2
4	(Austria) Innsbruck, Austria; June, 23–26	B	W	(Slovenia) Janja Garnbret	3T3z 3 3	(United States) Natalia Grossman	3T3z 9 9	(Serbia) Staša Gejo	1T3z 2 6
4	(Austria) Innsbruck, Austria; June, 23–26	L	M	(Austria) Jakob Schubert	47+	(Italy) Stefano Ghisolfi	47	(Switzerland) Sascha Lehman	38+
4	(Austria) Innsbruck, Austria; June, 23–26	L	W	(Slovenia) Janja Garnbret	TOP	(United States) Brooke Raboutou	40	(Japan) Akiyo Noguchi	38
5	(Switzerland) Villars, Switzerland; July, 1–3	L	M	(United States) Sean Bailey	38	(Germany) Alexander Megos	35+	(United States) Colin Duffy	31+
5	(Switzerland) Villars, Switzerland; July, 1–3	L	W	(Slovenia) Janja Garnbret	TOP	(Italy) Laura Rogora	TOP	(United States) Natalia Grossman	42+
5	(Switzerland) Villars, Switzerland; July, 1–3	S	M	(Indonesia) Veddriq Leonardo	5.329	(Russia) Dmitrii Timofeev	7.35	(Indonesia) Kiromal Katibin	5.306
5	(Switzerland) Villars, Switzerland; July, 1–3	S	W	(Russia) Ekaterina Barashchuk	7.306	(Russia) Iuliia Kaplina	8.397	(Poland) Patrycja Chudziak	7.736
6	(France) Chamonix, France; July, 12–13	L	M	(United States) Sean Bailey	34+	(Italy) Stefano Ghisolfi	32	(Czech Republic) Martin Stráník	32
6	(France) Chamonix, France; July, 12–13	L	W	(Italy) Laura Rogora	TOP	(United States) Natalia Grossman	41+	(Bulgaria) Aleksandra Totkova	38+
7	(France) Briançon, France; July, 17–18	L	M	(Italy) Stefano Ghisolfi	42+	(Russia) Dmitrii Fakirianov	39+	(Czech Republic) Martin Stráník	37+
7	(France) Briançon, France; July, 17–18	L	W	(Czech Republic) Eliška Adamovská	36	(United States) Natalia Grossman	35+	(Slovenia) Vita Lukan	29
8	(Slovenia) Kranj, Slovenia; September, 3–4 (Note: Originally scheduled to be held in Ljubljana, Slovenia. Moved from 4–5 September.)	L	M	(Japan) Masahiro Higuchi	37	(Slovenia) Luka Potočar	31+	(Germany) Sebastian Halenke	31+
8	(Slovenia) Kranj, Slovenia; September, 3–4	L	W	(Slovenia) Janja Garnbret	49+	(South Korea) Chaehyun Seo	46	(United States) Natalia Grossman	41+

== Bouldering ==
The overall ranking is determined based upon points, which athletes are awarded for finishing in the top 30 of each individual event. There were four competitions in the season. The national ranking is the sum of the points of that country's three best male and female athletes. Results displayed (in brackets) are not counted.

=== Men ===
The results of the ten most successful athletes of the Bouldering World Cup 2021:

Rank	Name	Points	Meiringen	Salt Lake City I	Salt Lake City II	Innsbruck
1	(Japan) Yoshiyuki Ogata	255	2. 80	16. 20	4. 55	1. 100
2	(Japan) Kokoro Fujii	255	4. 55	4. 55	2. 80	3. 65
3	(Czech Republic) Adam Ondra	200	1. 100	1. 100	( — )	( — )
4	(United States) Sean Bailey	166	13. 26	8. 40	1. 100	47. 0
5	(France) Mejdi Schalck	157	12. 28	2. 80	9. 37	20. 12
6	(Japan) Tomoa Narasaki	145	( — )	( — )	3. 65	2. 80
7	(United States) Nathaniel Coleman	142	5. 51	21. 10	10. 34	6. 47
8	(Austria) Nicolai Užnik	132	14. 24	11. 31	15. 22	4. 55
9	(Germany) Alexander Megos	129	8. 40	9. 37	14. 24	12. 28
10	(Belgium) Simon Lorenzi	123.5	29. 1.5	7. 43	12. 28	5. 51

=== Women ===
The results of the ten most successful athletes of the Bouldering World Cup 2021:

Rank	Name	Points	Meiringen	Salt Lake City I	Salt Lake City II	Innsbruck
1	(United States) Natalia Grossman	345	3. 65	1. 100	1. 100	2. 80
2	(Slovenia) Janja Garnbret	280	1. 100	( — )	2. 80	1. 100
3	(France) Oriane Bertone	235	2. 80	2. 80	4. 55	16. 20
4	(United States) Brooke Raboutou	207	9. 37	3. 65	3. 65	8. 40
5	(Japan) Miho Nonaka	192	7. 43	4. 55	6. 47	6. 47
6	(Serbia) Staša Gejo	173	13. 26	11. 31	5. 51	3. 65
7	(Slovenia) Katja Debevec	158	6. 47	8. 40	7. 43	12. 28
8	(Japan) Futaba Ito	135	( — )	7. 43	9. 37	4. 55
9	(Japan) Akiyo Noguchi	122	4. 55	( — )	18. 16	5. 51
10	(Japan) Mao Nakamura	92	( — )	10. 34	14. 24	10. 34

=== National Teams ===
The results of the ten most successful countries of the Bouldering World Cup 2021:

Country names as used by the IFSC

Rank	Name	Points	Meiringen	Salt Lake City I	Salt Lake City II	Innsbruck
1	Japan	1235.0	2. 298.0	3. 231.0	2. 308.0	1. 398.0
2	United States	1088.0	3. 209.0	1. 265.0	1. 390.0	2. 224.0
3	Slovenia	798.0	1. 312.0	5. 148.0	4. 168.0	3. 170.0
4	France	635.85	4. 156.6	2. 238.75	3. 177.0	8. 63.5
5	Austria	498.25	7. 91.95	4. 204.0	10. 34.8	4. 167.5
6	Germany	403.1	6. 93.5	6. 119.0	5. 108.0	5. 82.6
7	Belgium	215.55	12. 22.0	8. 69.55	7. 51.0	6. 73.0
8	Czech Republic	200.0	5. 100.0	7. 100.0	( — )	( — )
9	Italy	190.6	11. 22.95	9. 66.0	9. 45.7	10. 55.95
10	Serbia	173.0	10. 26.0	11. 31.0	7. 51.0	7. 65.0

* = Joint place with another athlete

== Lead ==
The overall ranking is determined based upon points, which athletes are awarded for finishing in the top 30 of each individual event. There were five competitions in the season. The national ranking is the sum of the points of that country's three best male and female athletes. Results displayed in parentheses are not counted.

=== Men ===
The results of the ten most successful athletes of the Lead World Cup 2021:

Rank	NAME	Points	Innsbruck	Villars	Chamonix	Briançon	Kranj
1	(Italy) Stefano Ghisolfi	319	2. 80	11. 31	2. 80	1. 100	12. 28
2	(United States) Sean Bailey	277	( — )	1. 100	1. 100	4. 55	15. 22
3	(Japan) Masahiro Higuchi	263	4. 55	7. 43	9. 37	12. 28	1. 100
4	(Slovenia) Luka Potočar	212	7. 43	25. 6	7. 43	8. 40	2. 80
5	(Switzerland) Sascha Lehmann	204	3. 65	12. 28	4. 55	5. 51	26. 5
6	(Czech Republic) Martin Stráník	192.87	12. 28	32. 0.87	3. 65	3. 65	10. 34
7	(Spain) Alberto Ginés López	169	5. 51	5. 51	14. 24	7. 43	( — )
8	(Germany) Sebastian Halenke	160.0	57. 0	4. 55	15. 22	17. 18	3. 65
9	(Slovenia) Domen Škofic	135	17. 18	15. 22	25. 6	10. 34	4. 55
10	(Germany) Alexander Megos	127	6. 47	2. 80	( — )	( — )	( — )

=== Women ===
The results of the ten most successful athletes of the Lead World Cup 2021:

Rank	NAME	Points	Innsbruck	Villars	Chamonix	Briançon	Kranj
1	(Slovenia) Janja Garnbret	300	1. 100	1. 100	( — )	( — )	1. 100
2	(United States) Natalia Grossman	296	25. 6	3. 65	2. 80	2. 80	3. 65
3	(Italy) Laura Rogora	278	7. 43	2. 80	1. 100	( — )	4. 55
4	(Slovenia) Vita Lukan	269	6. 47	5. 51	4. 55	3. 65	5. 51
5	(Slovenia) Lucka Rakovec	185	8. 40	7. 43	23. 8	6. 47	6. 47
6	(Bulgaria) Aleksandra Totkova	168	18. 16	6. 47	3. 65	8. 40	( — )
7	(Czech Republic) Eliška Adamovská	162	12. 28	( — )	10. 34	1. 100	( — )
8	(Japan) Momoko Abe	146	13. 26	4. 55	11. 31	25. 6	12. 28
9	(Japan) Natsuki Tanii	128	( — )	( — )	5. 51	9. 37	8. 40
9	(Slovenia) Lana Skusek	128	16. 20	11. 31	43. 0	7. 43	10. 34

=== National Teams ===
The results of the ten most successful countries of the Lead World Cup 2021:

Country names as used by the IFSC

Rank	Nation	Points	Innsbruck	Villars	Chamonix	Briançon	Kranj
1	Slovenia	1244.0	2. 274.0	2. 229.0	5. 135.0	1. 230.0	1. 376.0
2	Japan	1041.0	1. 279.0	3. 193.0	4. 158.0	5. 134.0	2. 277.0
3	United States	905.95	5. 110.55	1. 269.0	2. 237.0	2. 200.5	5. 88.9
4	Italy	796.8	3. 149.75	6. 132.85	1. 244.5	4. 164.0	4. 105.7
5	France	593.95	8. 80.75	5. 147.2	3. 192.0	7. 87.0	6. 87.0
6	Germany	547.2	10. 57.2	4. 159.0	7. 91.35	6. 95.85	3. 143.8
7	Czech Republic	396.55	7. 96.0	19. 0.9	6. 99.85	3. 165.8	13. 34.0
8	Austria	364.25	4. 117.65	7. 71.75	13. 35.5	9. 77.75	8. 61.6
9	Switzerland	340.15	6. 96.3	9. 50.4	8. 86.8	10. 70.95	12. 35.7
10	Russia	262.55	9. 57.75	11. 41.8	12. 40.0	8. 80.0	11. 43.0

== Speed ==
The overall ranking is determined based upon points, which athletes are awarded for finishing in the top 30 of each individual event. There were two competitions in the season. The national ranking is the sum of the points of that country's three best male and female athletes. Results displayed (in brackets) are not counted.

=== Men ===
The results of the ten most successful athletes of the Speed World Cup 2021:

Rank	Name	Points	Salt Lake City	Villars
1	(Indonesia) Veddriq Leonardo	200	1. 100	1. 100
2	(Indonesia) Kiromal Katibin	145	2. 80	3. 65
3	(Poland) Marcin Dzieński	96	3. 65	11. 31
4	(United States) John Brosler	81	4. 55	13. 26
5	(Russia) Dmitrii Timofeev	80	—	2. 80
6	(France) Pierre Rebreyend	59	7. 43	18. 16
7	(Russia) Vladislav Deulin	55	—	4. 55
8	(United States) Merritt Ernsberger	51	5. 51	—
8	(Iran) Mehdi Alipour	51	—	5. 51
10	(Ukraine) Yaroslav Tkach	50	8. 40	21. 10

=== Women ===
The results of the ten most successful athletes of the Speed World Cup 2021:

Rank	Name	Points	Salt Lake City	Villars
1	(United States) Emma Hunt	131	2. 80	5. 51
2	(Poland) Patrycja Chudziak	120	4. 55	3. 65
3	(Poland) Aleksandra Mirosław	100*	1. 100	—
3	(Russia) Ekaterina Barashchuk	100*	—	1. 100
5	(France) Anouck Jaubert	94*	5. 51	7. 43
5	(Poland) Natalia Kalucka	94*	6. 47	6. 47
7	(Russia) Iuliia Kaplina	85	—	2. 80
8	(France) Capucine Viglione	74	8. 40	10. 34
9	(Japan) Miho Nonaka	65	3. 65	—
10	(Indonesia) Desak Made Rita Kusuma Dewi	55	—	4. 55

=== National Teams ===
The results of the ten most successful countries of the Speed World Cup 2021:

Country names as used by the IFSC

Rank	Nation	Points	Salt Lake City	Villars
1	Indonesia	503	4. 180.0	2. 323.0
2	Poland	447	2. 267.0	3. 180.0
3	United States	396.8	1. 276.0	5. 120.8
4	Russia	384	—	1. 384.0
5	France	340	3. 207.0	4. 133.0
6	(Japan)	140.55	5. 139.55	15. 1.0
7	Italy	132.5	7. 75.0	7. 57.5
8	Ukraine	130	6. 95.0	10. 35.0
9	Austria	101.8	8. 63.9	9. 37.9
10	(Germany)	85.85	9. 63.0	12. 22.85

* = Joint place with another athlete

== Medal table ==
Rank	Nation	Gold	Silver	Bronze	Total
1	United States (USA)	5	5	6	16
2	Slovenia (SLO)	5	2	1	8
3	Czech Republic (CZE)	3	0	2	5
4	Japan (JPN)	2	3	5	10
5	Italy (ITA)	2	3	0	5
6	Indonesia (INA)	2	1	1	4
7	Russia (RUS)	1	3	0	4
8	Poland (POL)	1	0	2	3
9	Austria (AUT)	1	0	1	2
10	France (FRA)	0	3	0	3
11	Germany (GER)	0	1	1	2
12	South Korea (KOR)	0	1	0	1
13	Bulgaria (BUL)	0	0	1	1
13	Serbia (SER)	0	0	1	1
13	Switzerland (SUI)	0	0	1	1
Totals (15 entries)		22	22	22	66

== See also ==
- Sport climbing at the 2020 Summer Olympics
- 2021 IFSC Climbing World Championships
