= Capucine Viglione =

French speed climber

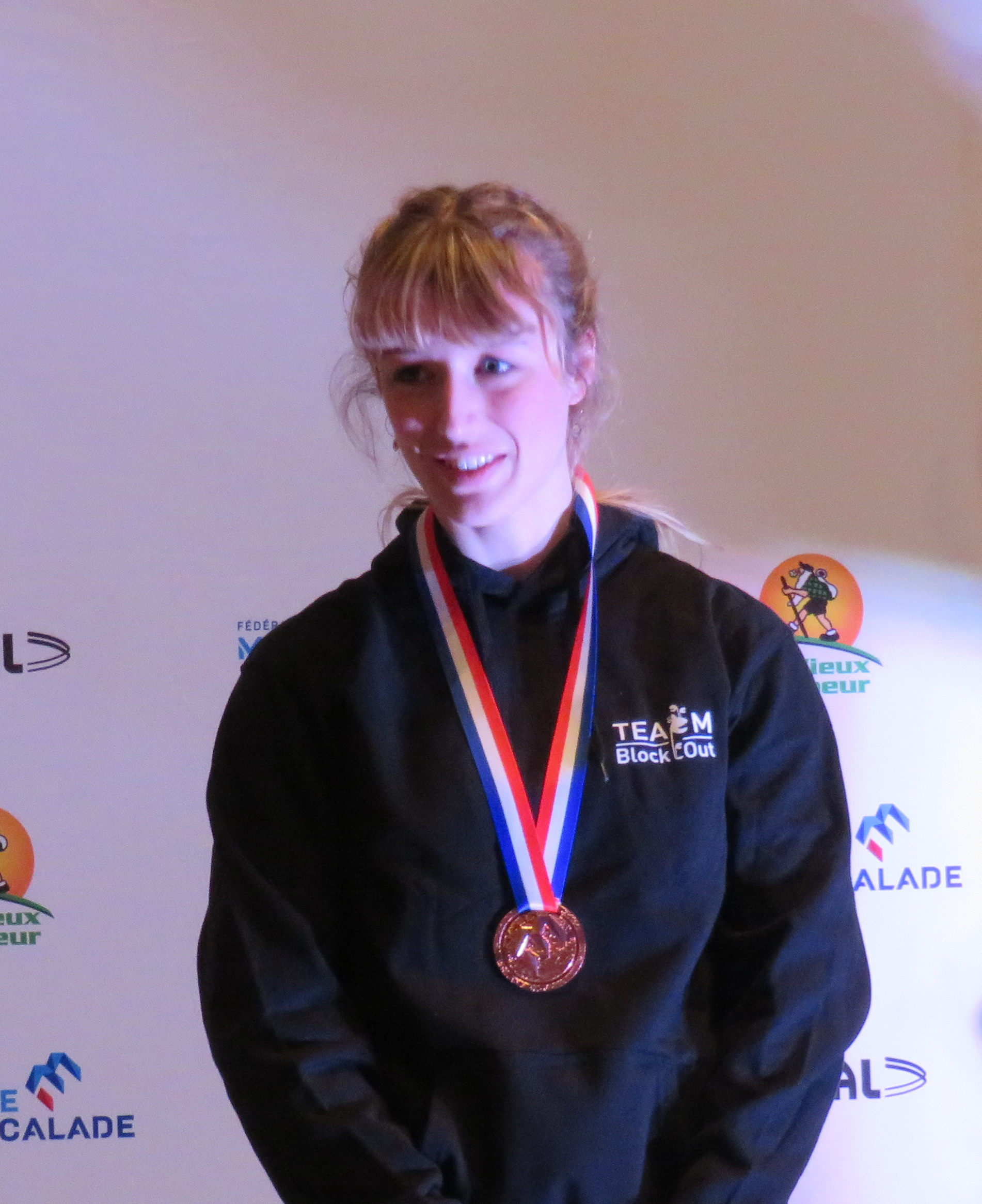
- Capucine Viglione (2022)

Personal information
- Nationality: French
- Born: December 9, 2002 (age 23) Marseille, France
- Years active: 2016–present
- Height: 170 cm (5 ft 7 in)

Sport
- Sport: Sport climbing
- Event: Speed
- Coached by: Sylvain Chapelle
- Updated on 15 September 2024

Capucine Viglione (born 9 December 2002) is a French competition climber who specializes in competition speed climbing. She was a finalist for the 2024 French Olympic team in the speed climbing event.

== Early life ==
Viglione started climbing at age 5, practicing bouldering. She discovered speed climbing in 2015 when she moved from Marseille and joigned a club in Massy. In 2016, she finished 3rd in the U15 French championship and joined the French national team.

In 2021, she won the gold medal at the European Youth Championships. She set a new French record at the 2023 European Speed Climbing Olympic Qualifier with 6.68 s.

Viglione competed in speed climbing at the 2024 Summer Olympics. She qualified 10th in the seeding heats, and lost her run in the elimination heat against Deng Lijuan of China.

== Major results ==
=== Olympic Games ===
Discipline	2024
Speed	10

=== World championships ===
Discipline	2021	2023
Speed	6	13

=== World Cup ===
Discipline	2018	2019	2021	2022	2023	2024
Speed	33	24	8	7	13	17
