= Colin Duffy (climber) =

American rock climber (born 2003)

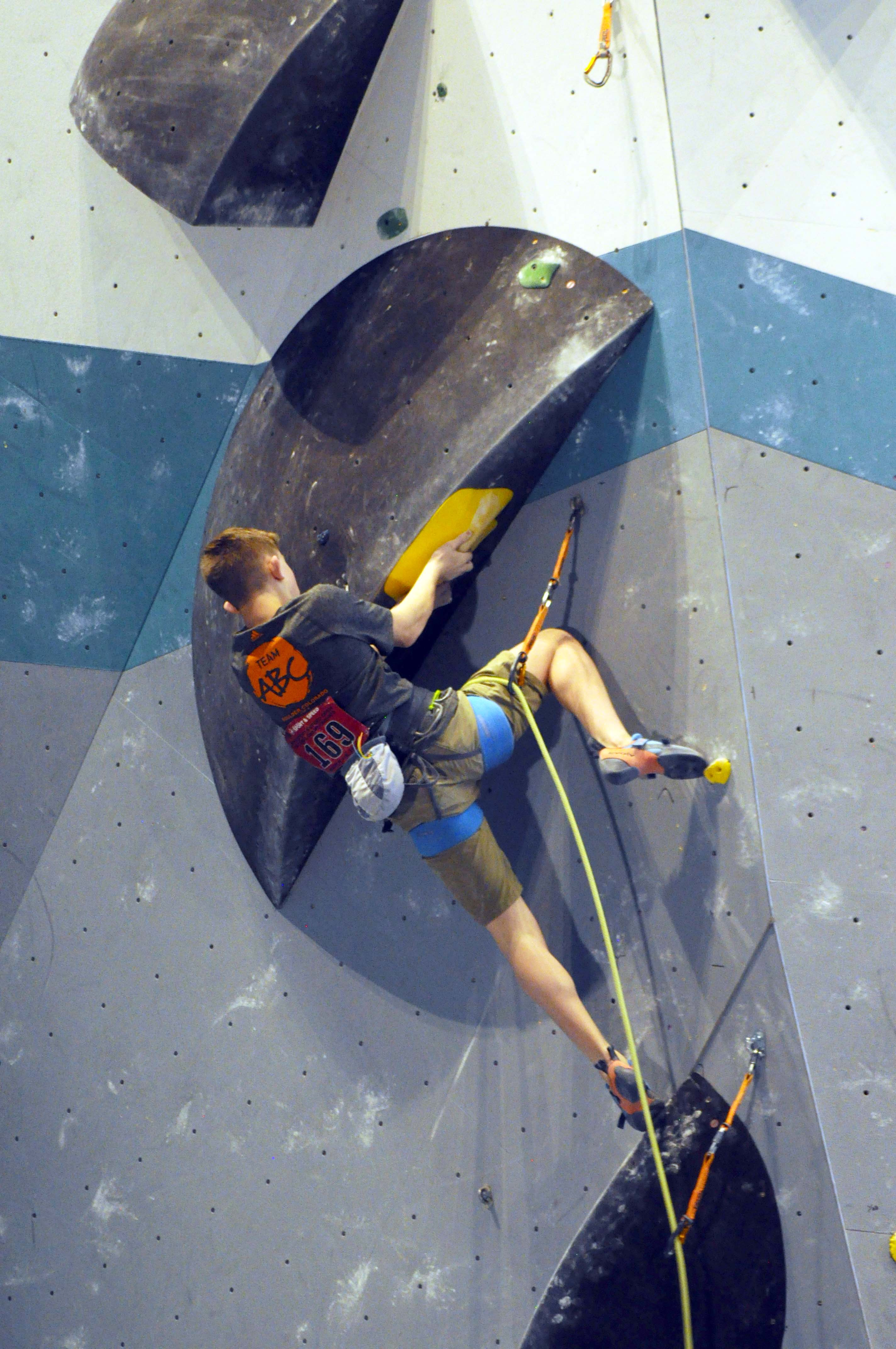
- Duffy in 2019

Personal information
- Born: December 10, 2003 (age 22) Broomfield, Colorado, U.S.
- Occupation: Rock Climber
- Height: 170 cm (5 ft 7 in)

Climbing career
- Type of climber: Sport climbing; Bouldering; Competition climbing
- Highest grade: Redpoint: 5.14d (9a); Onsight/Flash: 5.14a (8b+); Bouldering: V16 (8C+)
Medal record
Men's competition climbing
Representing the United States
Event	1st	2nd	3rd
World Championships	0	1	0
World Cup	3	1	2
Total	3	2	2
World Championships
Silver medal – second place	2023 Bern	Combined
World Cup
Bronze medal – third place	2021 Villars	Lead
Gold medal – first place	2022 Innsbruck	Bouldering
Gold medal – first place	2022 Innsbruck	Lead
Bronze medal – third place	2022 Villars	Lead
Gold medal – first place	2024 Chamonix	Lead
Silver medal – second place	2026 Madrid	Bouldering
Pan American Games
Gold medal – first place	Los Angeles 2020	Combined
Youth World Cup
Gold medal – first place	2017 Innsbruck	Lead
Gold medal – first place	2018 Moscow	Lead
Silver medal – second place	2017 Montreal	Lead
Silver medal – second place	2019 Arco	Lead

Colin Duffy (born December 10, 2003) is an American professional rock climber who specializes in competition climbing. At age 17, he became the youngest climber to qualify to compete at the 2020 Summer Olympic Games in Tokyo.

== Climbing career ==
=== Competition climbing ===
Duffy started climbing at age five before joining Team ABC in Boulder, Colorado at age eight, where he trained under Robyn Erbesfield-Raboutou and was teammates with future Olympic teammate Brooke Raboutou.

As a youth competition climber, Duffy won the IFSC Climbing World Youth Championships twice in 2017 and 2018 and finished second in 2019. Additionally, he was a 10-time USAC Youth National Champion.

Duffy won his first IFSC Climbing World Cup medal at the 2021 IFSC Climbing World Cup by finishing third in lead in the Villars, Switzerland leg.

At the 2020 Tokyo Olympics, he advanced to the final round of the sport climbing competition and finished in seventh place.

Duffy won his first IFSC gold medal at the 2022 IFSC Climbing World Cup, finishing first in the competition bouldering event at the Innsbruck leg. Two days later, Duffy won his second gold by finishing first in the men's competition lead climbing event. He is the first male athlete to win both bouldering and lead climbing in the same IFSC World Cup event.

=== Sport climbing ===
In 2019, aged 15, Duffy redpointed two 5.14c (8c+) graded sport climbing routes at the Red River Gorge, Pure Imagination and Southern Smoke, and onsighting the 5.14a (8b+) graded sport route Omaha Beach, in a single day; two days later he redpointed the 5.14a (8b+) route God's Own Stone. In November 2021, he climbed his first 5.14d (9a) graded sport route, Life of Villains. Duffy has also solved a V16 (8C+) grade bouldering problem, Bookkeeping.

Duffy is sponsored by Black Diamond, Evolv, and Friction Labs.

=== IFSC World Cup Rankings ===
Discipline	2022	2024	2025	2026
Lead	6	15	15	39
Bouldering	8	12	11	8
Combined		5	-	-

== Personal life ==
Duffy has connections to Ireland. His great-grandfather, Michael, left the village of Aghamore, County Mayo in 1918 aged 19 and joined the US Navy before settling in New York.
