= Jesse Grupper =

American rock climber (born 1997)

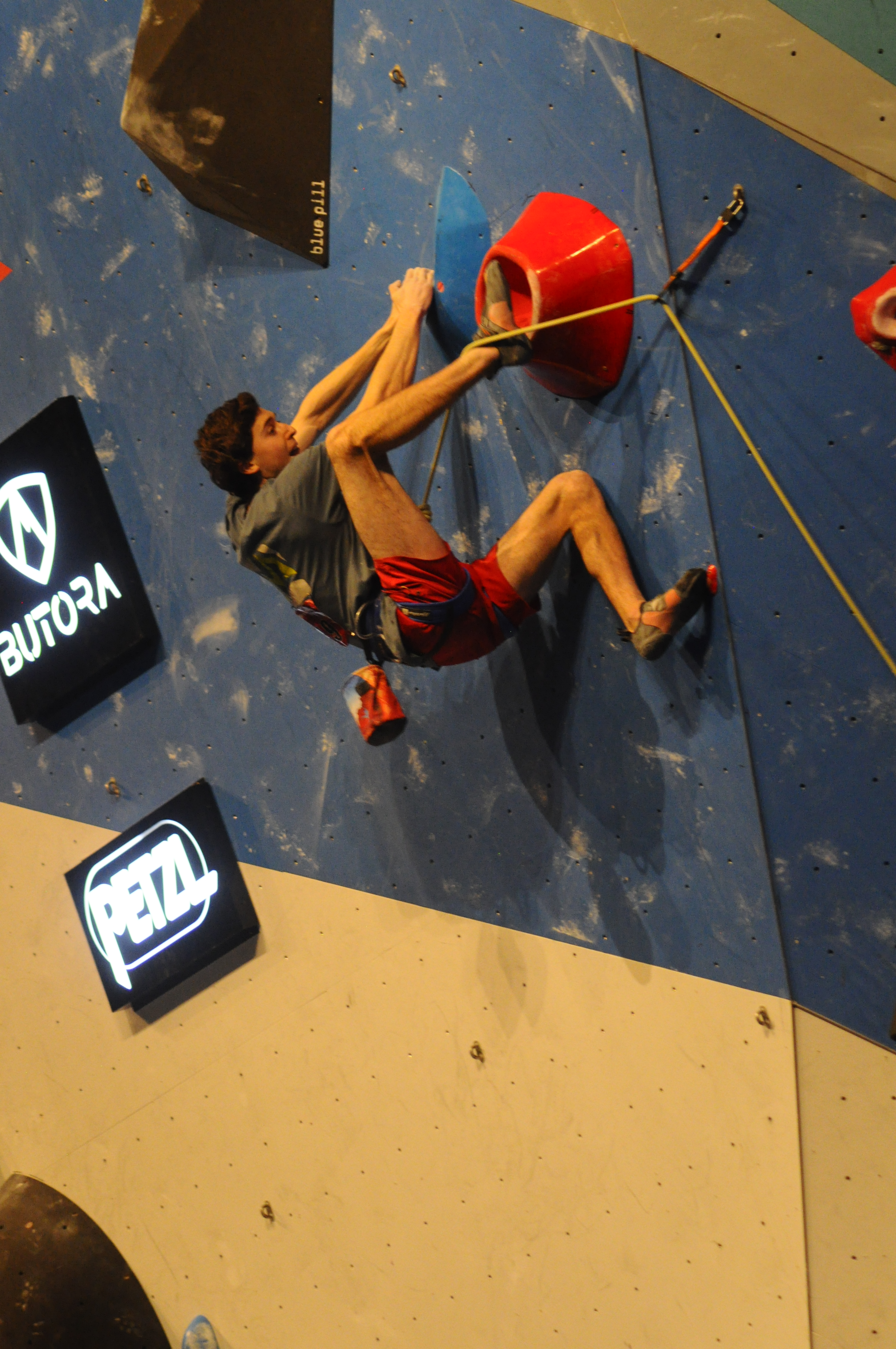
- 2019 Sport & Speed Open National final

Personal information
- Born: January 6, 1997 (age 29) New York City, New York, U.S.
- Height: 5 ft 11 in (180 cm)
- Spouses: Tufts University School of Engineering; Harvard John A. Paulson School of Engineering and Applied Sciences
- Website: jessegrupper.weebly.com

Climbing career
- Type of climber: Competition climbing; Sport climbing; Bouldering
- Ape index: +2
- Highest grade: Redpoint: 9a+ (5.15a); Bouldering: V14 (8B+)
Medal record
Men's competition climbing
Representing United States
World Cup
Gold medal – first place	2022 Briançon	Lead
Gold medal – first place	2022 Edinburgh	Lead
Silver medal – second place	2023 Koper	Lead
Silver medal – second place	2022 Villars	Lead
Bronze medal – third place	2022 Innsbruck	Lead
Pan American Games
Gold medal – first place	2023 Santiago	Bouldering & Lead

Jesse Grupper (/ˈɡruːpər/ GROO-pər; born January 6, 1997) is an American Olympic rock climber who specializes in competition climbing. In 2022, Grupper came in third overall in the 2022 IFSC Climbing World Cup in the competition lead climbing discipline. He earned the gold medal in the 2023 Pan American Championships in the combined boulder and lead climbing discipline. Grupper is competing for the United States at the 2024 Paris Olympics in Men's combined sport climbing on August 5, 7, and 9, 2024.

== Early life ==
Grupper was born on January 6, 1997, in New York City to Jonathan and Cathy Grupper, and his hometown is Upper Montclair, New Jersey. He is Jewish, and he and his family belong to Montclair's Reconstructionist Bnai Keshet synagogue, where Grupper commemorated his bar mitzvah. Ruth and Edward Grupper, his grandparents, assisted in founding the Rockland County, New York, New City Jewish Center Conservative synagogue.

He was diagnosed as a teenager with ulcerative colitis, an incurable inflammatory bowel disease; Grupper receives a medical infusion for the condition every eight weeks, and follows a gluten-free diet. In January 2021, he was in the hospital for a week after his medication stopped working, and he had a colitis flare-up; his father said that the incident brought Grupper to "death's door". He has been a longtime volunteer coach at a gym for a program helping kids who have disabilities.

Grupper attended Montclair High School. He graduated in 2015.

He then attended the Tufts University School of Engineering, from which Grupper graduated with a B.S. in mechanical engineering in 2019. He was a member of the university's climbing team, and started the Biomechanics Club to create devices to help people with disabilities. As a sophomore he created a prosthetic for a teenage hockey player who had a cleft hand, which helped him both hit the hockey puck with greater power, and perform daily tasks such as brushing his teeth.

After graduating, Grupper worked on human performance for a period of time at the Boston, Massachusetts, bio-design firm Harvard Biodesign Lab, developing exoskeletons for stroke victims to restore their movement. He is a research fellow at the Harvard John A. Paulson School of Engineering and Applied Sciences.

Grupper lives in Salt Lake City, Utah, where he also trains. He is 5 feet 11 inches (180 cm) tall.

== Career ==
=== Early years ===
Grupper began climbing when he was six years old, when his parents enrolled him in a rock climbing class in the indoor New Jersey Rock Gym in Fairfield, New Jersey, as his older sister Maddy began taking climbing lessons. Three years later, he began competing. He specializes in lead climbing, which consists of climbing a wall as high as one can in a six-minute timeframe, while using some equipment. Randi Goldberg is his longtime coach.

In 2008, when he was 11 years old, he won the USA Climbing Youth Bouldering Nationals. In 2014, Grupper won the "Youth A" USA Climbing's 2014 Sport Climbing Series Youth National Championships, in Atlanta, Georgia. In 2015, he competed in the IFSC Climbing World Youth Championships in Arco, Italy, and won the silver medal, and in 2018 he won the Collegiate Sport National Championships in Houston, Texas. He won the gold medal in the 2019 USA Climbing Sport Open Nationals.

=== 2022–present ===
In 2022, Grupper took the bronze medal in the 2022 IFSC Climbing World Cup in the overall competition lead climbing discipline, with two stage wins, one second, and one third through the seven international stages of the 2022 World Cup.

He took the gold medal in the 2023 Pan American Games in Santiago, Chile, in the combined boulder and lead climbing discipline, thus qualifying for the 2024 Olympics.

In April 2024 Grupper was the #1 ranked United States men's lead climber, and ranked #3 in boulder and lead. At that point, he had been a member of the United States youth team ten times, and a member of the United States open team five times.

==== 2024 Paris Olympics ====
Grupper is competing for the United States at the 2024 Paris Olympics, which is the second Olympic competition in sport climbing, in Men's combined sport climbing at the Le Bourget Sport Climbing Venue in Le Bourget in the Seine-Saint-Denis suburb of Paris on August 5, 7 and 9, 2024.

=== World Cup ===
==== Rankings ====
Discipline	2022
Lead	3

== See also ==
- List of Jewish rock climbers
