= Luka Potočar =

Slovenian rock climber

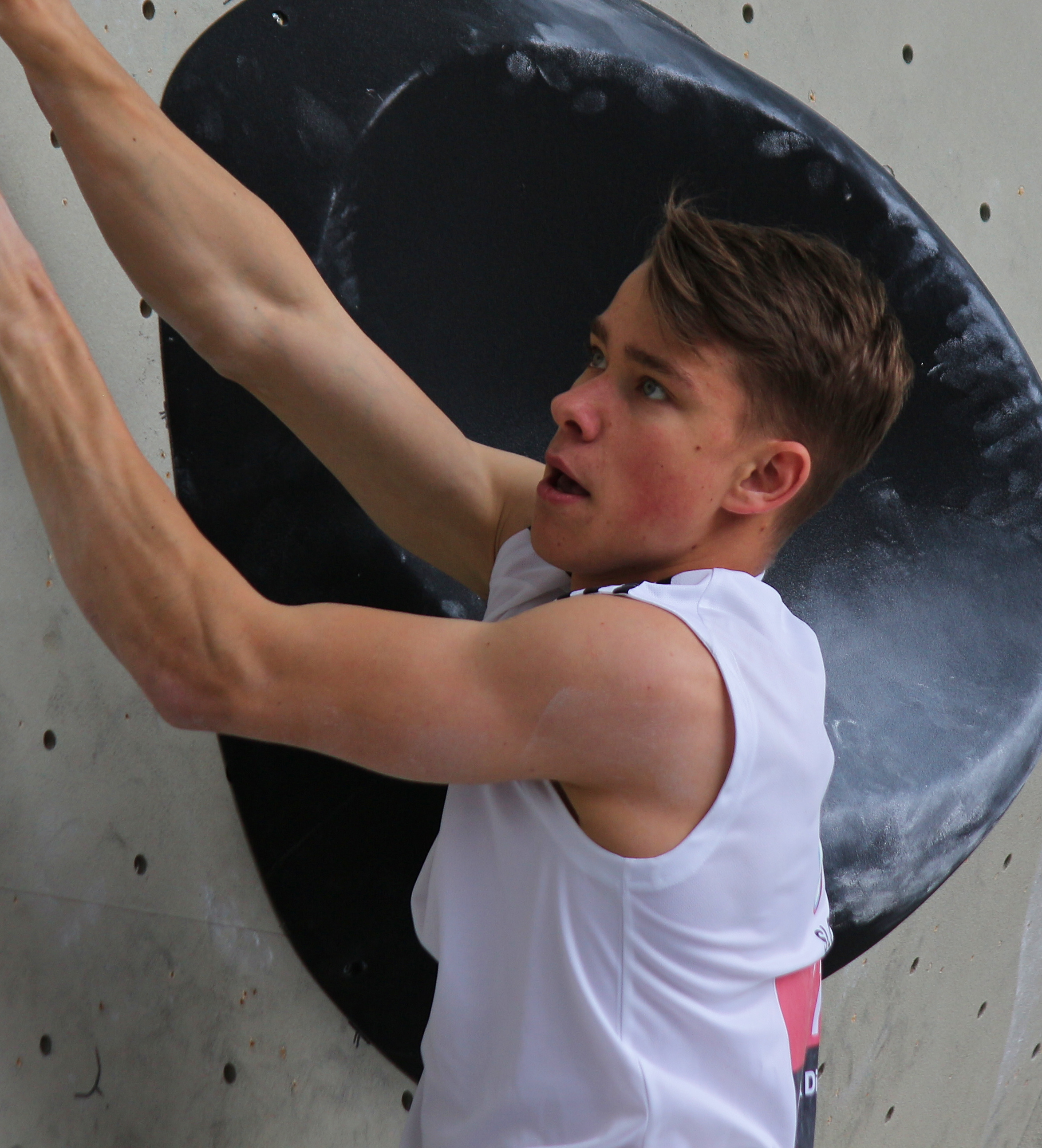
- Potočar in 2019

Personal information
- Born: 21 November 2001 (age 24) Jesenice, Slovenia
- Height: 1.77 m (5 ft 10 in)

Sport
- Country: Slovenia
- Sport: Competition climbing
Medal record
Men's competition climbing
Representing Slovenia
World Championships
Silver medal – second place	2021 Moscow	Lead
World Cup
Gold medal – first place	2022 Koper	Lead
Silver medal – second place	2026 Chamonix	Lead
Silver medal – second place	2022 Edinburgh	Lead
Silver medal – second place	2021 Kranj	Lead
European Championships
Silver medal – second place	2022 Munich	Lead

Luka Potočar is a Slovenian rock climber who specializes in competition climbing. He participated at the 2021 IFSC Climbing World Championships, winning the silver medal in the lead event.

Potočar competed for Slovenia at the 2024 Summer Olympics.

== See also ==
- List of grade milestones in rock climbing
- History of rock climbing
- Ranking of career IFSC victories by climber
