= Natalia Grossman =

American rock climber

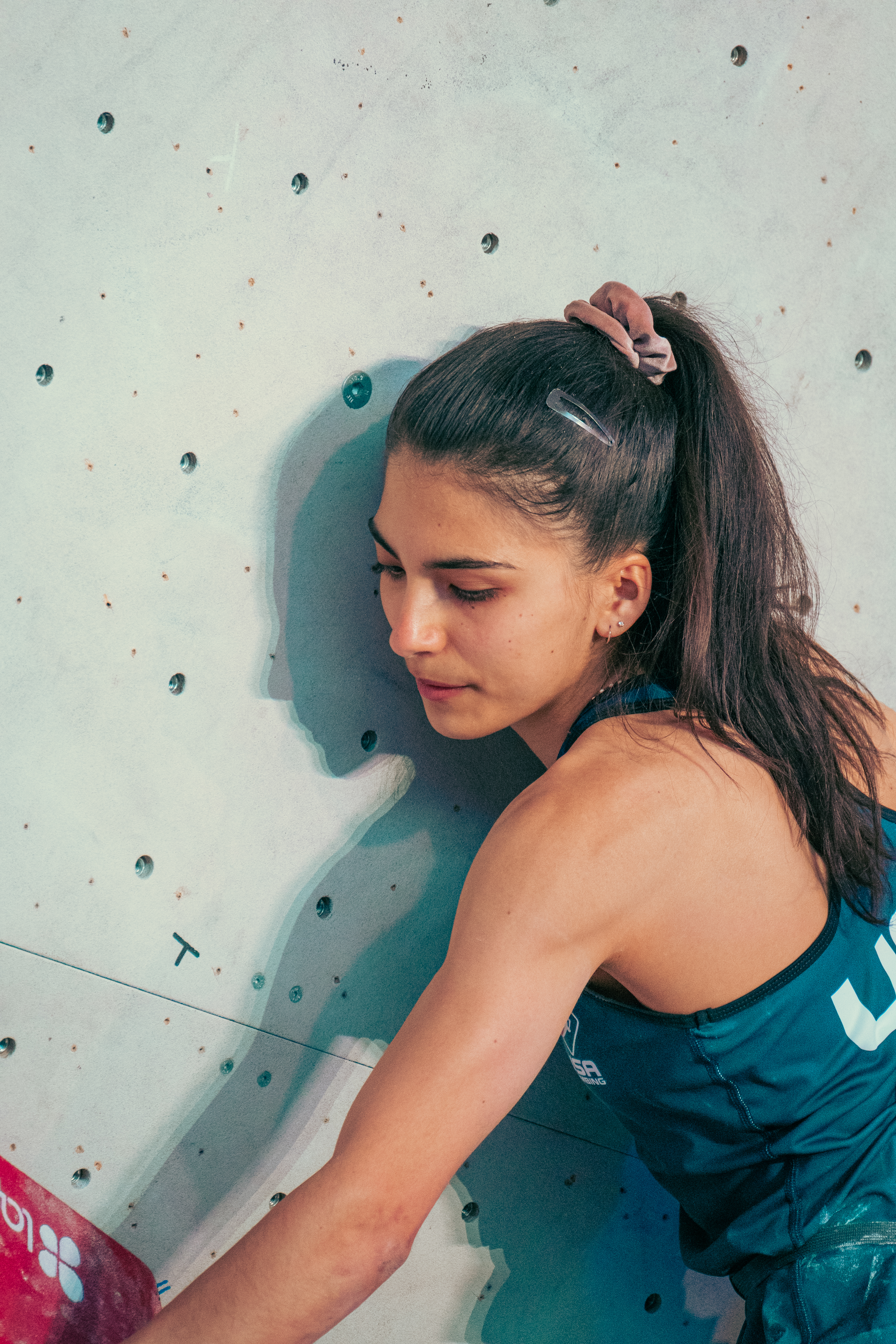
- Grossman in 2022

Personal information
- Born: June 22, 2001 (age 25) Santa Cruz, California, United States
- Education: University of Colorado Boulder (2022)
- Occupation: Rock climber
- Height: 5 ft 4 in (1.62 m)

Climbing career
- Type of climber: Competition climbing; Sport climbing; Bouldering
- Highest grade: Redpoint: 5.14b (8c); Bouldering: V13 (8B)
Medal record
Women's competition climbing
Representing the United States
| Event | 1st | 2nd | 3rd |
|---|---|---|---|
| World Championships | 1 | 1 | 0 |
| World Cup | 11 | 6 | 5 |
| Total | 12 | 7 | 5 |
World Championships
| Gold medal – first place | 2021 Moscow | Bouldering |
| Silver medal – second place | 2021 Moscow | Lead |
World Cup (Season)
| Winner | 2021 | Bouldering |
| Winner | 2022 | Bouldering |
| Winner | 2023 | Bouldering |
| Winner | 2024 | Bouldering |
| Second place | 2021 | Lead |
| Third place | 2022 | Lead |
World Cup
| Gold medal – first place | Salt Lake City 2021 | Bouldering |
| Gold medal – first place | Salt Lake City 2021 | Bouldering |
| Gold medal – first place | Seoul 2022 | Bouldering |
| Gold medal – first place | Salt Lake City 2022 | Bouldering |
| Gold medal – first place | Salt Lake City 2022 | Bouldering |
| Gold medal – first place | Brixen 2022 | Bouldering |
| Gold medal – first place | Innsbruck 2022 | Bouldering |
| Gold medal – first place | Salt Lake City 2023 | Bouldering |
| Gold medal – first place | Brixen 2023 | Bouldering |
| Gold medal – first place | Salt Lake City 2024 | Bouldering |
| Gold medal – first place | Prague 2024 | Bouldering |
| Silver medal – second place | Innsbruck 2021 | Bouldering |
| Silver medal – second place | Chamonix 2021 | Lead |
| Silver medal – second place | Briançon 2021 | Lead |
| Silver medal – second place | Meiringen 2022 | Bouldering |
| Silver medal – second place | Morioka-Iwate 2022 | Bouldering & Lead |
| Silver medal – second place | Innsbruck 2023 | Bouldering |
| Bronze medal – third place | Meiringen 2021 | Bouldering |
| Bronze medal – third place | Villars 2021 | Lead |
| Bronze medal – third place | Kranj 2021 | Lead |
| Bronze medal – third place | Villars 2022 | Lead |
| Bronze medal – third place | Briançon 2022 | Lead |
Pan American Games
| Gold medal – first place | 2023 Santiago | Bouldering & Lead |

Natalia Grossman (/ˈɡroʊsmən/ GROHSS-mən; born June 22, 2001) is an American professional rock climber who specializes in competition climbing. She represents the United States at IFSC Climbing World Cup in competition bouldering and competition lead climbing. She has had 22 podium finishes at World Cup events, including 11 gold medals, and is the only climber to have won four consecutive overall titles in bouldering, from 2021 through 2024.

Grossman became the first Latin climber to represent the United States in Olympic sport climbing, which marked a milestone for diversity in the sport. She represented the United States at the 2024 Summer Olympics in Paris, where she finished 11th overall in the women’s combined sport climbing semifinals.

== Early life ==
Grossman grew up in Santa Cruz, California, and spent parts of her youth visiting family in Tampico, Mexico, which shaped her connection to her Mexican heritage and Latin identity. She began climbing at age six, at the Pacific Edge climbing gym where Chris Sharma also climbed in his youth. She joined the Zero Gravity team that trained at Berkeley Ironworks, a gym that was an hour and 45 minutes away in Berkeley, California.

Following Zero Gravity's disbanding in 2014, her family moved to Boulder, Colorado in 2015 so she could train with Robyn Erbesfield-Raboutou's Team ABC.

== Climbing career ==
=== Competition climbing ===
Grossman finished second in the bouldering and combined disciplines at the 2019 IFSC Climbing World Youth Championships in Arco, Italy, where she also finished fourth in speed climbing and sixth in lead climbing. She went undefeated in the 2019-2020 bouldering National Cup Series and won the USA Climbing 2020 Bouldering Open National Championship.

=== 2021 Season ===
In 2021, Grossman finished first in bouldering and second in lead climbing at the USA Climbing National Team Trials in March, qualifying for the USA national team in both disciplines. In April, she won her first IFSC Climbing World Cup medal with a bronze at the Boulder World Cup in Meiringen. In May, across two IFSC events held in Salt Lake City, she won her first two World Cup gold medals, topping all four boulders in the final in the first event and flashing all four final boulders in the second, beating Janja Garnbret, who also topped all four boulders, on attempts and thereby becoming the first woman to beat Garnbret in a Boulder World Cup since 2018. In June, she won a silver medal at the Boulder World Cup in Innsbruck, winning her first overall title in the Boulder World Cup. In lead climbing, Grossman finished on the podium in four of five events, winning two silver and bronze medals each and finishing in second place in the overall rankings of the Lead World Cup. She closed out the season with a gold medal in bouldering and a silver medal in lead climbing at the 2021 IFSC Climbing World Championships in Moscow.

=== 2022 Season ===
In 2022, Grossman won the overall title in the Boulder World Cup by earning a place on the podium at every event that season, winning five gold medals and one silver medal. She also finished in third place in the overall rankings of the Lead World Cup after six straight appearances in finals and two bronze medals.

=== 2023 Season ===
In 2023, Grossman won two gold medals and one silver medal on her way to securing her third consecutive overall title in the Boulder World Cup. Later that year, she qualified for the 2024 Summer Olympics in Paris by winning the combined bouldering and lead climbing event at the 2023 Pan American Games in Santiago, Chile.

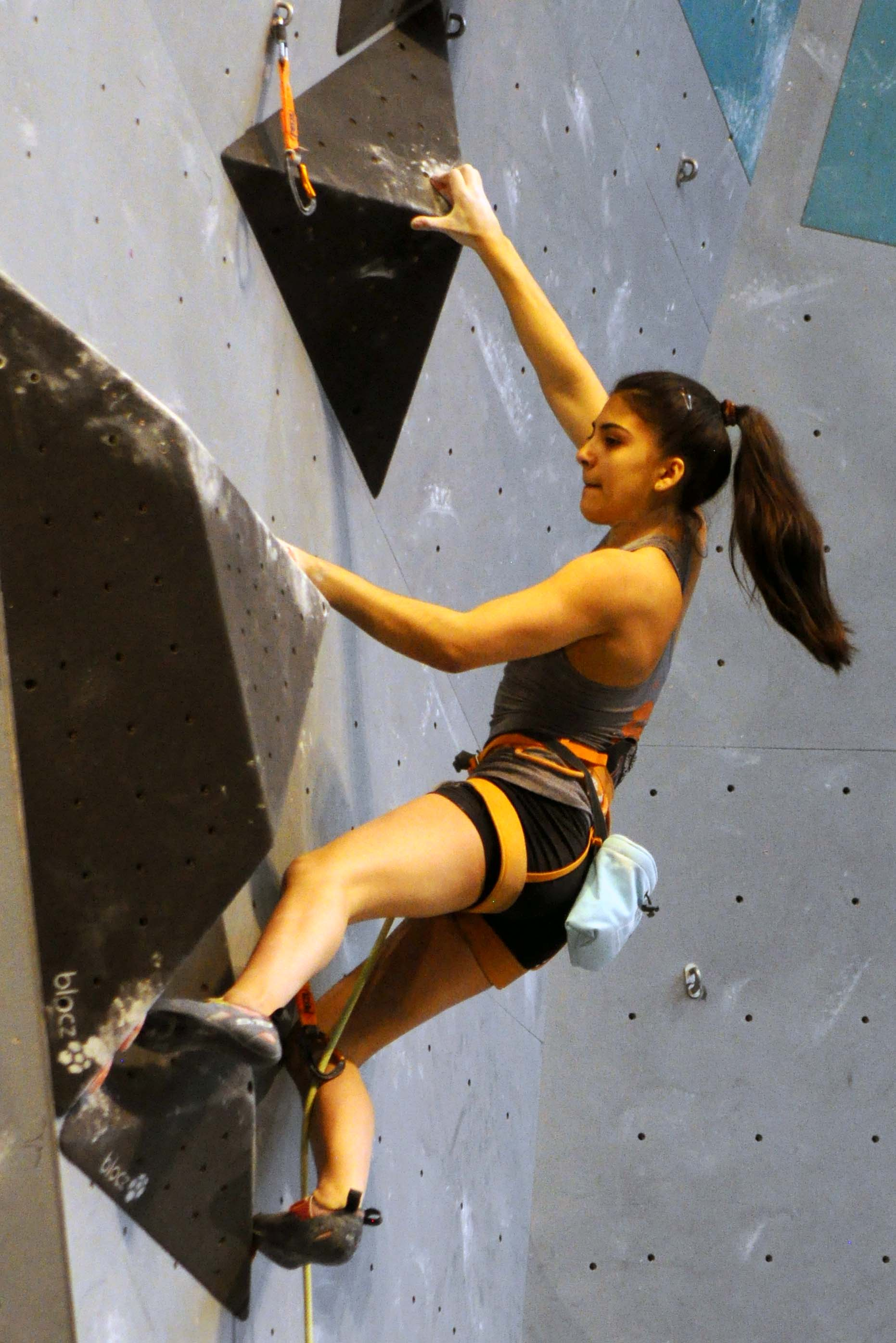
Grossman in 2019

=== 2024 Season ===
In 2024, Grossman suffered a knee injury on her way to winning a gold medal at the Boulder World Cup in Salt Lake City in May. Due to her injury, she did not compete again until competing at the Olympics in August, where she finished in eleventh place in the semifinals of the combined event and did not move on to finals. After winning another gold medal at the Boulder World Cup in Prague and finishing in fourth place at the Boulder World Cup in Seoul, Grossman won the overall title for the 2024 Boulder World Cup, becoming the first-ever climber to win four consecutive season titles in bouldering.

=== 2025 Season ===
Because of injury, Grossman did not compete in 2025.

=== 2026 season ===
In February 2026, Grossman won the women's title at the 2026 YETI USA Climbing Boulder National Championships held at High Point Climbing and Fitness in Orlando, Florida.

Grossman competed despite a partially dislocated right shoulder sustained roughly a month before the event. After narrowly advancing to the final round, she flashed three of the four final problems to secure the gold medal. Brooke Raboutou finished second and Melina Costanza took third.

=== Rock climbing ===
With competitions in 2020 canceled due to the COVID-19 pandemic, Grossman focused on outdoor climbs for the first time in her career, sending four V13 (8B) rated boulders in the Rocky Mountain National Park and redpointed the 5.14b (8c) rated sport climbing route, Positive Vibrations.

Grossman recorded the top overall score (242.8) at the 2021 BFL Climbing Combine, showcasing elite strength and endurance ahead of her breakout 2022 season. Her combine dominance preceded a landmark year on the IFSC circuit, where she captured multiple World Cup golds and secured the 2022 Bouldering title.

2021 pro measurables
| Height | Weight (lb / kg) | Bench Press (Max Reps 90 lbs) | Flying Ladder (Reps) | Front Lever (s) | Grippul Lift (STW%) | Weighted Pull-up (lb / kg) | Compression (s) | Overall Score |
|---|---|---|---|---|---|---|---|---|
| 5′3″ (1.60 m) | 104.4 (47 kg) | 1 | 2 | 2.8 | 93 (42 kg) | 79 (35 kg) | 52 | 242.8 |
All values from 2021 BFL Climbing Combine.

== World Cup results ==
=== Rankings ===
| Discipline | 2021 | 2022 | 2023 | 2024 |
|---|---|---|---|---|
| Bouldering | 1 | 1 | 1 | 1 |
| Lead | 2 | 3 | —N/a | —N/a |

=== Podiums ===
==== Lead ====
| Season | Gold | Silver | Bronze | Total |
|---|---|---|---|---|
| 2021 | 0 | 2 | 2 | 4 |
| 2022 | 0 | 0 | 2 | 2 |
| Total | 0 | 2 | 4 | 6 |

==== Bouldering ====
| Season | Gold | Silver | Bronze | Total |
|---|---|---|---|---|
| 2021 | 2 | 1 | 1 | 4 |
| 2022 | 5 | 1 | 0 | 6 |
| 2023 | 2 | 1 | 0 | 3 |
| 2024 | 2 | 0 | 0 | 2 |
| Total | 11 | 3 | 1 | 15 |

==== Bouldering & Lead ====
| Season | Gold | Silver | Bronze | Total |
|---|---|---|---|---|
| 2022 | 0 | 1 | 0 | 1 |
| Total | 0 | 1 | 0 | 1 |

== Personal life ==
Grossman attended the University of Colorado Boulder and graduated in 2022. In January 2021, she moved to Salt Lake City to train at USA Climbing's national team base while she continued taking classes online.

Grossman's mother is from Tampico, Mexico, where her family visited in summers and winters during her childhood.

She carries small mementos that remind her of loved ones, including a miniature climbing shoe keychain from a friend and a photo of her late grandmother, which she brings on trips for comfort and a sense of protection. Grossman emphasizes the importance of staying emotionally open and being present with her feelings rather than suppressing nerves or stress during high-level competitions.
