= Sport climbing at the 2023 Pan American Games =

Competition climbing at the 2023 Pan American Games
- Sport climbing pictogram
- Venue: Cerrillos Park Climbing Walls
- Start date: October 21, 2023
- End date: October 24, 2023
- No. of events: 4 (2 men, 2 women)
- Competitors: 68 from 11 nations

Competition climbing at the 2023 Pan American Games in Santiago, Chile took place between October 21 and 24, 2023 at the Cerrillos Park Climbing Walls in Santiago, Chile. The sport made its Pan American Games debut, after it was added to the sports program in December 2021. It was previously debuted at the 2020 Tokyo Olympics.

A total of up to 72 athletes (36 per gender) competed in two events (a competition speed climbing event and a combined competition bouldering & competition lead climbing event) for men and for women.

== Qualification ==
A total quota of 72 quotas were made available, 40 for boulder/lead and 32 for speed events (equally split among gender). country can qualify a maximum of three athletes per event, for a total of 12 (six men and six women). The world rankings of August 12, 2023, will assign all the quotas. The host nation Chile is guaranteed one athlete per event (four in total, two per gender). A total of 68 athletes qualified (with four quotas in women's speed being unused.

== Participating nations ==
A total of 11 countries qualified sport climbers. The number of athletes a nation has entered is in parentheses beside the name of the country.

- Argentina (6)
- Brazil (7)
- Canada (10)
- Chile (10)
- Ecuador (6)
- Independent Athletes Team (1)
- Mexico (9)
- Peru (2)
- Puerto Rico (1)
- United States (12)
- Venezuela (4)

== Medal summary ==
=== Medal table ===
* Host nation (Chile)

| Rank | NOC's | Gold | Silver | Bronze | Total |
|---|---|---|---|---|---|
| 1 | United States | 4 | 4 | 1 | 9 |
| 2 | Ecuador | 0 | 0 | 2 | 2 |
| 3 | Canada | 0 | 0 | 1 | 1 |
| Totals (3 entries) | | 4 | 4 | 4 | 12 |

=== Medalists ===
| Event | Gold | Silver | Bronze |
|---|---|---|---|
| Men's speed | Sam Watson; United States | Noah Bratschi; United States | Carlos Granja; Ecuador |
| Men's boulder & lead | Jesse Grupper; United States | Sean Bailey; United States | Zachary Galla; United States |
| Women's speed | Piper Kelly; United States | Emma Hunt; United States | Andrea Rojas; Ecuador |
| Women's boulder & lead | Natalia Grossman; United States | Brooke Raboutou; United States | Alannah Yip; Canada |

== See also ==
- Sport climbing at the 2024 Summer Olympics
