= Brooke Raboutou =

American rock climber

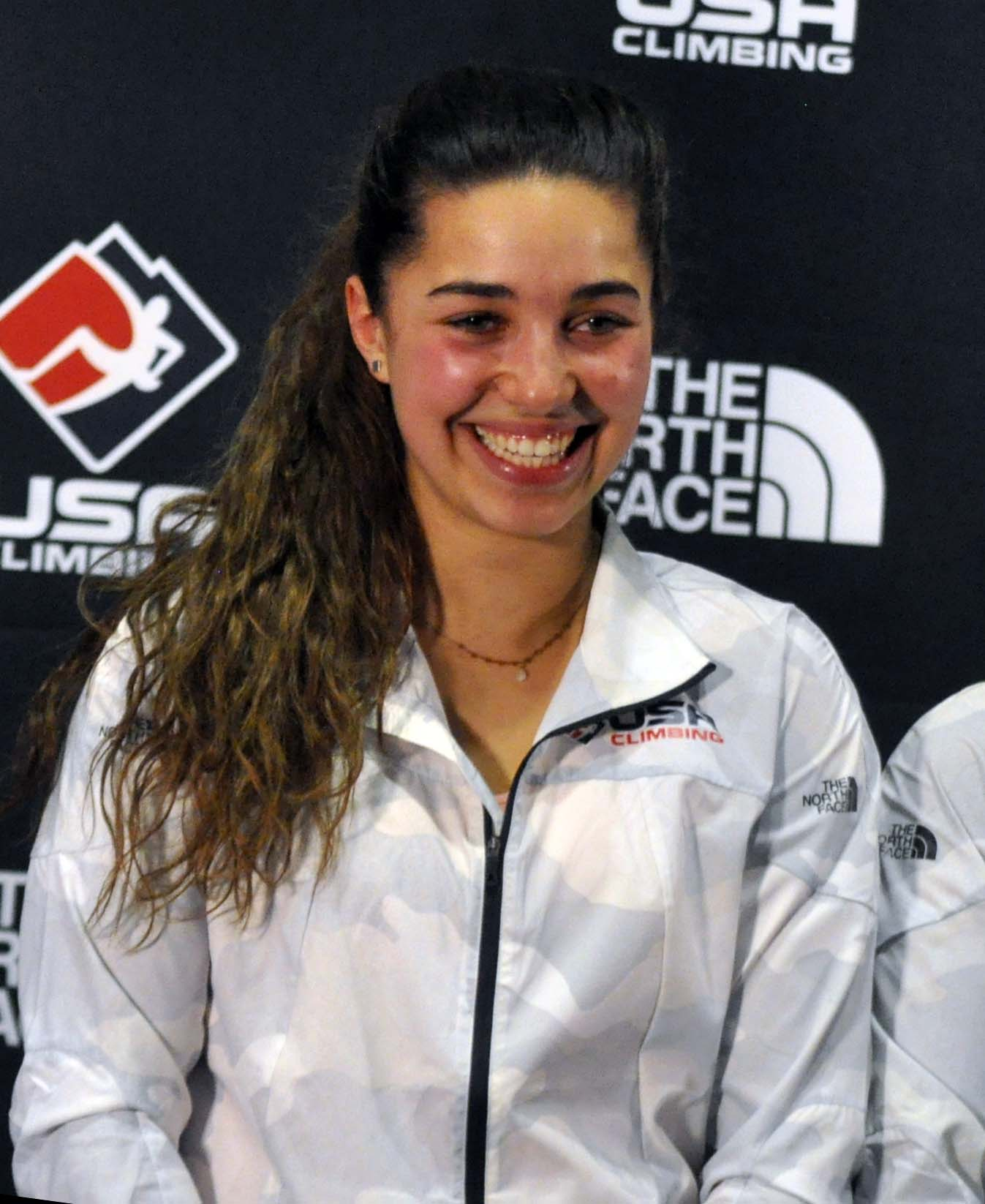
- Raboutou in 2019

Personal information
- Born: April 9, 2001 (age 25) Boulder, Colorado, U.S.
- Education: University of San Diego (2023)
- Occupation: Rock climber
- Height: 157 cm (5 ft 2 in)

Climbing career
- Type of climber: Competition climbing; Sport climbing; Bouldering
- Highest grade: Redpoint: 5.15c (9b+); Bouldering: V15 (8C)
Medal record
Women's competition climbing
Representing the United States
Olympic Games
Silver medal – second place	2024 Paris	Combined
World Championships
Bronze medal – third place	2023 Bern	Bouldering
World Cup (Season)
Bronze medal – third place	2022	Bouldering
Bronze medal – third place	2023	Bouldering
World Cup
Gold medal – first place	Hachioji 2023	Bouldering
Silver medal – second place	Innsbruck 2021	Lead
Silver medal – second place	Salt Lake City 2022	Bouldering
Silver medal – second place	Villars 2022	Lead
Silver medal – second place	Koper 2026	Lead
Bronze medal – third place	Salt Lake City 2021	Bouldering
Bronze medal – third place	Salt Lake City 2021	Bouldering
Bronze medal – third place	Seoul 2022	Bouldering
Bronze medal – third place	Salt Lake City 2022	Bouldering
Bronze medal – third place	Innsbruck 2022	Lead
Bronze medal – third place	Koper 2022	Lead
Bronze medal – third place	Seoul 2023	Bouldering
Bronze medal – third place	Salt Lake City 2023	Bouldering
Bronze medal – third place	Villars 2023	Lead
Bronze medal – third place	Madrid 2025	Lead
Pan American Games
Silver medal – second place	2023 Santiago	Bouldering & Lead
- Updated on August 20, 2026

Brooke Raboutou (/ˈræbətuː/ RAB-ə-too; born April 9, 2001) is an American professional rock climber who specializes in competition climbing (lead and boulder), sport climbing and bouldering. She is an Olympic silver medalist in the combined bouldering and lead climbing event (2024). She is the first-ever woman to redpoint a 5.15c (9b+) graded sport-climbing route with her 2025 ascent of Excalibur.

== Early life ==
Both of Raboutou's parents, Didier Raboutou and Robyn Erbesfield-Raboutou, are former world champion competition climbers and leading outdoor sport climbers with notable first free ascents. Her brother, Shawn Raboutou, is a professional rock climber who specializes in bouldering.

Raboutou attended the University of San Diego and was a member of Gamma Phi Beta Sorority.

== Climbing career ==
=== Rock climbing ===
At age 9, she climbed a V10 (7C+) boulder, and became the youngest woman to climb a 5.13b (8a) sport climbing route. At 10, she sent a V11 (8A) boulder and became the youngest woman to climb a 5.13d (8b) sport climbing route. At 11, she became the youngest woman to send a 5.14b (8c) sport climbing route.

In October 2023, she made the second female ascent of Box Therapy, a V16 (8C+) boulder, and proposed a downgrade to V15 (8C).

In April 2025, she made the first female ascent of Excalibur, a 5.15c (9b+) sport climbing route. In doing so, she became the first woman to ever climb a sport climbing route at that grade.

=== Competition climbing ===
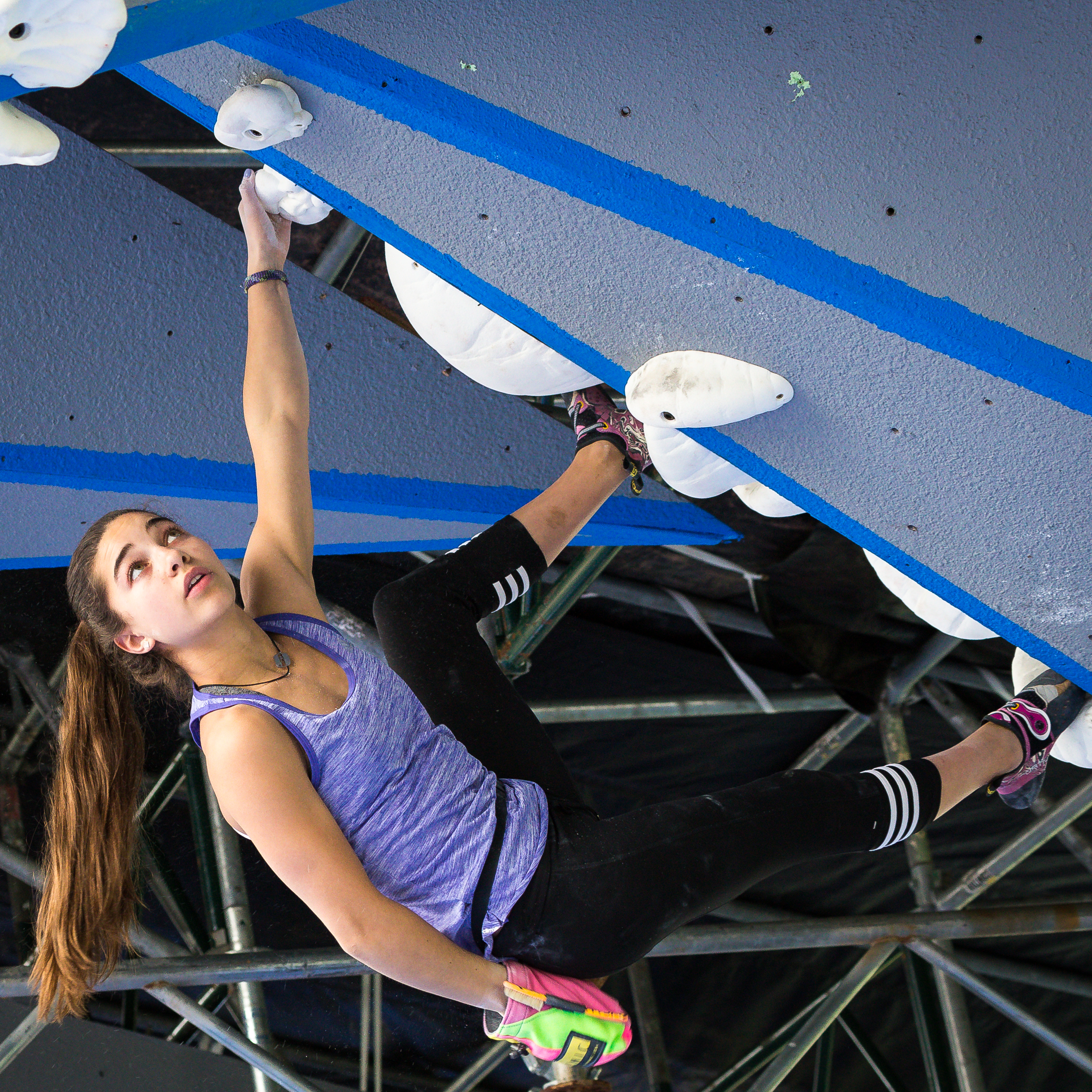
Raboutou at the 2016 Dominion Riverrock

Raboutou was at the University of San Diego in 2018 before taking time off to prepare for the 2020 Summer Olympics in Tokyo, where she finished in 5th place in the combined event.

In April 2023, she won the IFSC Boulder World Cup in Hachioji, Japan, claiming her first ever IFSC Climbing World Cup gold medal.

In 2024, Raboutou placed first in the rankings of the boulder and lead combined event at the Olympic Qualifier Series, securing a spot for the combined event at the 2024 Summer Olympics in Paris.

Raboutou won the silver medal in the combined event at the 2024 Summer Olympics, becoming the first American woman to win an Olympic medal in sport climbing.

== Rankings ==
=== World Cups ===
==== Season rankings ====
Discipline	2018	2019	2021	2022	2023	2024
Lead	58	46	17	5	15	–
Bouldering	49	55	4	3	3	29
Speed	70	73	21	–	–	–

==== Podiums ====
Bouldering

Season	First	Second	Third	Total
2021	–	–	2	2
2022	–	1	2	3
2023	1	0	2	3
Total	1	1	6	8

Lead

Season	First	Second	Third	Total
2021	–	1	–	1
2022	–	1	2	3
2023	–	–	1	1
2025	–	–	1	1
2026	–	1	–	1
Total	0	3	4	7

=== Climbing World Championships ===
Youth

Discipline	2016 Youth B	2017 Youth A	2018 Youth A	2019 Juniors
Lead	2	2	1	3
Bouldering	3	3	6	–
Speed	17	28	18	–
Combined	1	2	–	–

Senior

Discipline	2019 Hachioji	2021 Moscow	2023 Bern
Lead	15	5	5
Bouldering	41	5	3
Speed	24	–	–
Combined	9	–	4

== Filmography ==
- The Fanatic Search 2 - A Girl Thing (2011)
- Reel Rock S1 E6: Origins: Obe & Ashima (2011)
- The Bronco Sport with Brooke Raboutou (2020)
- The Wall: Climb for Gold (2022)
