= Bouldering at the 2023 IFSC Climbing World Cup =

- Location: Hachioji, Japan; Seoul, South Korea Salt Lake City, United States; Prague, Czech Republic; Brixen, Italy Innsbruck, Austria
- Dates: 21 April – 18 June 2023

Champions
- Men: (Japan) Sorato Anraku
- Women: (United States) Natalia Grossman

The 2023 season of the IFSC Climbing World Cup was the 24th season of the competition. Bouldering competitions were held at six stops of the IFSC Climbing World Cup. The bouldering season began on April 21 at the World Cup in Hachioji, and concluded on June 18 with the World Cup in Innsbruck. At each stop a qualifying was held on the first day of the competition, and the semi-final and final rounds were conducted on the second day of the competition. The winners were awarded trophies, and the best three finishers received medals. At the end of the season an overall ranking was determined based upon points, which athletes were awarded for finishing in the top 40 of each individual event.

Natalia Grossman won the women's seasonal title. The men's seasonal title went to Sorato Anraku while Japan defended its title in the national teams competition.

== Overview ==
Date	Location	Routesetters*	Men	Women
April, 21-23	Hachioji, Japan	(France) **Remi Samyn**; (Poland) Olga Niemiec; (Spain) Sergio Verdasco	(France) Mejdi Schalck	(United States) Brooke Raboutou
April, 28-30	Seoul, South Korea	(Switzerland) **Manuel Hassler**; (Japan) Tsukasa Mizuguchi; (Poland) Marcin Wszolek	(France) Mejdi Schalck	(Japan) Miho Nonaka
May, 19-21	Salt Lake City, United States	(United Kingdom) **Jamie Cassidy**; (Japan) Tsukuru Hori; (Japan) Tsukasa Mizuguchi	(Japan) Tomoa Narasaki	(United States) Natalia Grossman
June, 2-4	Prague, Czech Republic	(Japan) **Akito Matsushima**; (Poland) Olga Niemiec; (France) Pierre Broyer	(South Korea) Lee Dohyun	(France) Oriane Bertone
June, 9-11	Brixen, Italy	(Austria) **Matthias Woitzuck**; (United Kingdom) Jamie Cassidy; (Japan) Tsukuru Hori; (Italy) Anna Borella	(United Kingdom) Toby Roberts	(United States) Natalia Grossman
June, 14-18	Innsbruck, Austria	(Poland) **Tomasz Oleksy**; (Japan) Gen Hirashima; (Israel) Stephanie Sexton; (Spain) Sergio Verdasco	(Japan) Sorato Anraku	(Slovenia) Janja Garnbret
**OVERALL WINNERS**			(Japan) **Sorato Anraku**	(United States) **Natalia Grossman**
**NATIONAL TEAM**			**Japan**	

* Chief routesetters are in bold.

== Overall ranking ==
The overall ranking is determined based upon points, which athletes are awarded for finishing in the top 80 of each individual event. The end-of-season standings are based on the sum of points earned from the five best finishes for each athlete. Results displayed (in brackets) are not counted. The national ranking is the sum of the points of that country's three best male and female athletes.

=== Men ===
The results of the ten most successful athletes of the Bouldering World Cup 2023:

Rank	Name	Points	Hachioji	Seoul	Salt Lake City	Prague	Brixen	Innsbruck
1	(Japan) Sorato Anraku	3350	5. 545	(29. 52*)	2. 805	7. 455	5. 545	1. 1000
2	(South Korea) Lee Dohyun	3130	7. 455	4. 610	(39. 15.3*)	1. 1000	2. 805	14. 260
3	(Japan) Tomoa Narasaki	3000	10. 350	2. 805	1. 1000	10. 350	6. 495	(11. 325)
4	(United Kingdom) Toby Roberts	2710	(25. 89.5*)	8. 415	3. 690	15. 240	1. 1000	9. 365*
5	(France) Mejdi Schalck	2690	1. 1000	1. 1000	(-)	3. 690	-	-
6	(Japan) Yoshiyuki Ogata	2335	13. 280	12. 300	(16. 220)	4. 610	3. 690	7. 455
7	(South Korea) Chon Jong-won	2275	6. 495	3. 690	14. 260	(16. 220)	16. 220	4. 610
8	(Belgium) Hannes Van Duysen	2140	2. 805	13. 280	6. 495	13. 280	(-)	13. 280
9	(Japan) Meichi Narasaki	1945	8. 415	(85. 0)	25. 89.5*	35. 25.5*	4. 610	2. 805
10	(Germany) Yannick Flohé	1750.5	11. 325	7. 455	(-)	5. 545	8. 415	45. 10.5*

=== Women ===
The results of the ten most successful athletes of the Bouldering World Cup 2023:

Rank	Name	Points	Hachioji	Seoul	Salt Lake City	Prague	Brixen	Innsbruck
1	(United States) Natalia Grossman	3527.5	8. 397.5*	11. 325	1. 1000	(-)	1. 1000	2. 805
2	(Japan) Miho Nonaka	3005	11. 325	1. 1000	9. 380	4. 610	(-)	3. 690
3	(United States) Brooke Raboutou	2990	1. 1000	3. 690	3. 690	(-)	-	4. 610
4	(France) Oriane Bertone	2649.5	31. 39.5*	2. 805	2. 805	1. 1000	(-)	-
5	(Israel) Ayala Kerem	1995	4. 610	6. 495	(-)	13. 280	4. 610	-
6	(Serbia) Staša Gejo	1893	27. 68*	10. 350	(-)	5. 545	3. 690	15. 240
7	(Australia) Oceana Mackenzie	1880	(35. 25.5*)	13. 280	12. 300	7. 455	5. 545	12. 300
8	(Slovenia) Janja Garnbret	1805	(-)	-	-	2. 805	-	1. 1000
9	(United States) Anastasia Sanders	1765	37. 20*	5. 545	4. 610	(-)	15. 240	10. 350
10	(South Korea) Seo Chae-hyun	1744.5	14. 250	(29. 52*)	25. 89.5*	8. 415	2. 805	18. 185

* = Joint place with another athlete

=== National Teams ===
The results of the ten most successful countries of the Bouldering World Cup 2023:

Country names as used by the IFSC

Rank	Name	Points	Hachioji	Seoul	Salt Lake City	Prague	Brixen	Innsbruck
1	Japan	19130	3000	3395	3210	2740	2795	3990
2	France	13908	2336	3535	2328	3042	847	1820
3	United States	12598.5	1575	1828	3650	848	2260	2437.5
4	(South Korea) Korea	8028	1295	1407	550	1681	1857	1238
5	Germany	5895	1384	1252	443.5	874	1242	699.5
6	Slovenia	5859	872	315	361	1831	857	1623
7	Austria	5311	770	980	582	1354	980	645
8	United Kingdom	5236.5	370	995	1072	547	1725	527.5
9	Belgium	4323	921	772	658	610	27	1335
10	Israel	4151.33	1151	717	805	483	932	63.33

== Hachioji, Japan (21-23 April) ==
=== Women ===
74 athletes attended the World Cup in Hachioji. Brooke Raboutou won her first World Cup in front of Hannah Meul as the only athlete to get 3 tops and 1 zone. Brooke Raboutou was the only athlete to top boulders 3 and 4 in the final. Anon Matsufuji completed the podium, earning her first IFSC World Cup medal.

Rank	Name	Score
1	(United States) Brooke Raboutou	3T4z 6 6
2	(Germany) Hannah Meul	1T3z 1 8
3	(Japan) Anon Matsufuji	0T3z 0 7
4	(Israel) Ayala Kerem	0T3z 0 9
5	(China) Luo Zhilu	0T3z 0 11
6	(Slovenia) Mia Krampl	0T1z 0 9

=== Men ===
91 athletes attended the World Cup in Hachioji. Mejdi Schalck won the competition, being the only athlete to top more than one boulder. He was the only one to top boulder 1. Hannes Van Duysen placed 2nd, claiming his first IFSC World Cup medal. Paul Jenft rounded out the podium in third.

Rank	Name	Score
1	(France) Mejdi Schalck	2T3z 7 7
2	(Belgium) Hannes Van Duysen	1T3z 2 11
3	(France) Paul Jenft	1T3z 3 3
4	(Japan) Kokoro Fujii	0T3z 0 9
5	(Japan) Sorato Anraku	0T3z 0 11
6	(South Korea) Chon Jong-won	0T3z 0 13

== Seoul, South Korea (28-30 April) ==
=== Women ===
75 athletes attended the World Cup in Seoul. The results were based on semifinal standings after the finals were cancelled due to rain delay. Miho Nonaka won the competition — her first win since Meiringen 2018. Oriane Bertone and Brooke Raboutou finished second and third respectively, separated only by attempts.

Rank	Name	Score
1	(Japan) Miho Nonaka	2T3z 20 22
2	(France) Oriane Bertone	2T2z 4 3
3	(United States) Brooke Raboutou	2T2z 10 7
4	(Japan) Anon Matsufuji	1T3z 4 15
5	(United States) Anastasia Sanders	1T3z 5 23
6	(Israel) Ayala Kerem	1T2z 6 9

=== Men ===
87 athletes attended the World Cup in Seoul. The results were based on semifinal standings after the finals were cancelled due to rain delay. Seoul winner Mejdi Schalck won back-to-back World Cups, finishing ahead of Tomoa Narasaki, with attempts separating the two. Chon Jong-won placed third, his first podium since Vail 2019.

Rank	Name	Score
1	(France) Mejdi Schalck	2T3z 2 7
2	(Japan) Tomoa Narasaki	2T3z 6 10
3	(South Korea) Chon Jong-won	2T2z 2 2
4	(South Korea) Lee Dohyun	1T2z 1 9
5	(France) Manuel Cornu	1T2z 4 5
6	(Austria) Nicolai Uznik	1T1z 2 2

== Salt Lake City, United States (19–21 May) ==
=== Women ===
61 athletes attended the World Cup in Salt Lake City. Last year's winner Natalia Grossman was the only athlete to achieve 4 tops, winning a fifth-straight boulder gold in Salt Lake City. Oriane Bertone won silver over Brooke Raboutou.

Rank	Name	Score
1	(United States) Natalia Grossman	4T4z 5 5
2	(France) Oriane Bertone	2T4z 3 6
3	(United States) Brooke Raboutou	2T3z 4 10
4	(United States) Anastasia Sanders	1T4z 6 16
5	(China) Luo Zhilu	1T3z 1 5
6	(France) Fanny Gibert	0T3z 0 7

=== Men ===
64 athletes attended the World Cup in Salt Lake City. In the final, teammates Tomoa Narasaki and Sorato Anraku topped all the boulders in the finals, but Narasaki won the gold medal based on attempts. Anraku won silver and Toby Roberts bronze respectively — claiming their first IFSC World Cup medals.

Rank	Name	Score
1	(Japan) Tomoa Narasaki	4T4z 6 5
2	(Japan) Sorato Anraku	4T4z 12 6
3	(United Kingdom) Toby Roberts	3T4z 8 10
4	(United States) Sean Bailey	3T3z 8 7
5	(Japan) Daiki Sano	2T4z 6 11
6	(Belgium) Hannes Van Duysen	2T3z 3 4

== Prague, Czech Republic (2-4 June) ==
=== Women ===
73 athletes attended the World Cup in Prague. Oriane Bertone won her first World Cup ahead of Janja Garnbret. Bertone and Garnbret were the only athletes to get 3 tops and 4 zones in the final, separated only by 2 attempts to top. Flavy Cohaut completed the podium, earning her first IFSC World Cup medal in her first final.

Rank	Name	Score
1	(France) Oriane Bertone	3T4z 4 5
2	(Slovenia) Janja Garnbret	3T4z 6 7
3	(France) Flavy Cohaut	2T3z 6 12
4	(Japan) Miho Nonaka	1T3z 1 3
5	(Serbia) Stasa Gejo	0T2z 0 8
6	(Japan) Futaba Ito	0T2z 0 9

=== Men ===
94 athletes attended the World Cup in Prague. Prague 2023 marked Adam Ondra's return to boulder World Cups since 2021. Lee Dohyun won his first World Cup in front of Adam Ondra. Both Lee and Ondra completed all 4 problems in the final. But Lee claimed gold due to lower attempts to top. Mejdi Schalck placed third.

Rank	Name	Score
1	(South Korea) Lee Dohyun	4T4z 5 5
2	(Czech Republic) Adam Ondra	4T4z 13 9
3	(France) Mejdi Schalck	3T4z 3 6
4	(Japan) Yoshiyuki Ogata	3T4z 5 5
5	(Germany) Yannick Flohé	3T3z 9 7
6	(Austria) Jan-Luca Posch	1T3z 1 7

== Brixen, Italy (9-11 June) ==
=== Women ===
79 athletes attended the World Cup in Brixen. Natalia Grossman won the competition, repeating her win in Brixen last year. Seo Chae-hyun took the silver — her first boulder World Cup medal. Stasa Gejo won bronze, making her first podium since the World Championships in Moscow two years before.

Rank	Name	Score
1	(Japan) Natalia Grossman	4T4z 12 12
2	(South Korea) Seo Chae-hyun	3T4z 3 9
3	(Serbia) Stasa Gejo	3T4z 5 6
4	(Israel) Ayala Kerem	3T4z 10 16
5	(Australia) Oceania Mackenzie	2T3z 5 6
6	(Austria) Johanna Färber	1T2z 4 14

=== Men ===
90 athletes attended the World Cup in Brixen. Toby Roberts was the only athlete to get 3 tops and 4 zones, winning his first World Cup. Few attempts to tops and zones proved important for the podium as the 2nd to 4th placements were separated by attempts. In the final, Sorato Anraku was the only one to top boulder 2. Lee Dohyun and Yoshiyuki Ogata claimed silver and bronze respectively.

Rank	Name	Score
1	(United Kingdom) Toby Roberts	3T4z 10 7
2	(South Korea) Lee Dohyun	2T4z 3 4
3	(Japan) Yoshiyuki Ogata	2T4z 5 6
4	(Japan) Meichi Narasaki	2T4z 5 11
5	(Japan) Sorato Anraku	2T2z 5 2
6	(Japan) Tomoa Narasaki	1T2z 1 2

== Innsbruck, Austria (14-18 June) ==
=== Women ===
92 athletes attended the World Cup in Innsbruck. In the final, Janja Garnbret flashed all four boulders to take the win. Natalia Grossman and Miho Nonaka placed second and third respectively, separated by attempts.

Rank	Name	Score
1	(Slovenia) Janja Garnbret	4T4z 4 4
2	(United States) Natalia Grossman	2T4z 2 11
3	(Japan) Miho Nonaka	2T4z 2 13
4	(United States) Brooke Raboutou	2T3z 5 11
5	(Japan) Ai Mori	1T2z 1 3
6	(Japan) Futaba Ito	0T3z 0 12

=== Men ===
110 athletes attended the World Cup in Innsbruck. Last year's winner Colin Duffy failed to advance past the semi-final round. Sorato Anraku won his first World Cup ahead of compatriot Meichi Narasaki with attempts separating them. In the final, Anraku was the only athlete to get a zone and top on boulder 2. This also marked Narasaki's first World Cup podium since Vail 2017. Sam Avezou placed third, earning his first World Cup medal.

Rank	Name	Score
1	(Japan) Sorato Anraku	3T3z 11 9
2	(Japan) Meichi Narasaki	3T3z 15 11
3	(France) Sam Avezou	2T2z 4 3
4	(South Korea) Chon Jong-won	2T2z 6 6
5	(Belgium) Nicolas Collin	2T2z 7 7
6	(Belgium) Simon Lorenzi	0T0z 0 0
