= Sport climbing at the 2018 Summer Youth Olympics – Girls' combined =

Girls' combined at the III Summer Youth Olympic Games
- Venue: Parque Urbano
- Date: 7 October (qualification); 9 October (final)
- Competitors: 21 from 15 nations
- Winning score: 18

Medalists
1st place, gold medalist(s)		Sandra Lettner	Austria
2nd place, silver medalist(s)		Vita Lukan	Slovenia
3rd place, bronze medalist(s)		Laura Lammer	Austria

The girls' combined competition at the 2018 Summer Youth Olympics was held at the Parque Urbano on 7 and 9 October.

== Results ==
=== Qualification ===
==== Speed ====
Rank	Athlete	Lane A	Lane B	Best	Points
1	Aleksandra Kałucka (POL)	8.10	Fall	8.10	1
2	Natalia Kałucka (POL)	8.65	8.31	8.31	2
3	Elena Krasovskaia (RUS)	9.15	10.18	9.15	3
4	Laura Lammer (AUT)	9.19	10.04	9.19	4
5	Alejandra Contreras (CHI)	10.19	9.69	9.69	5
6	Valentina Aguado (ARG)	9.91	10.03	9.91	6
7	Lucile Saurel (FRA)	10.76	9.97	9.97	7
8	Sandra Lettner (AUT)	10.03	10.44	10.03	8
9	Luiza Emeleva (RUS)	10.11	10.64	10.11	9
10	Hannah Meul (GER)	10.80	11.10	10.80	10
11	Narada Disyabut (THA)	12.60	10.85	10.85	11
12	Lučka Rakovec (SLO)	11.83	11.23	11.23	12
13	Laura Rogora (ITA)	11.29	11.71	11.29	13
14	Mao Nakamura (JPN)	11.38	11.58	11.38	14
15	Hannah Herrmann (SUI)	12.55	12.59	12.55	15
16	Sarah Tetzlaff (NZL)	12.72	13.03	12.72	16
17	Vita Lukan (SLO)	12.98	13.20	12.98	17
18	Catherine Carkner (CAN)	14.46	13.69	13.69	18
19	Angela Eckhardt (RSA)	14.24	14.15	14.15	19
20	Annalisa Tognon (SUI)	14.44	16.10	14.44	20
21	Nolwenn Arc (FRA)	Fall	18.05	18.05	21

==== Bouldering ====
Rank	Athlete	Boulder				Result	Attempts	Attempts to zone	Points
Rank	Athlete	1	2	3	4	Result	Attempts	Attempts to zone	Points
1	Mao Nakamura (JPN)	T	T	T	T	4T 4z	6	6	1
2	Hannah Meul (GER)	T	T	T	T	4T 4z	8	6	2
3	Vita Lukan (SLO)	T	z	T	T	3T 4z	11	8	3
4	Sandra Lettner (AUT)	T	z	T	T	3T 4z	12	14	4
5	Laura Rogora (ITA)	T		T	T	3T 4z	13	12	5
6	Elena Krasovskaia (RUS)	z		T	T	2T 4z	10	10	6
7	Valentina Aguado (ARG)	T		z	T	2T 3z	4	3	7
8	Luiza Emeleva (RUS)	z	T		T	2T 3z	4	6	8
9	Laura Lammer (AUT)	z		T	T	2T 3z	6	7	9
10	Nolwenn Arc (FRA)	z	z		T	1T 3z	1	3	10
11	Lucile Saurel (FRA)	z		z	T	1T 3z	2	11	11
12	Natalia Kałucka (POL)	z		z	T	1T 3z	3	8	12
13	Lučka Rakovec (SLO)	z	z		T	1T 3z	3	13	13
14	Alejandra Contreras (CHI)	z		z	T	1T 3z	4	9	14
15	Narada Disyabut (THA)	z			T	1T 2z	4	9	15
16	Catherine Carkner (CAN)	z			T	1T 2z	5	4	16
17	Aleksandra Kałucka (POL)	z			T	1T 2z	5	9	17
18	Hannah Herrmann (SUI)	z			z	0T 2z	0	4	18
19	Annalisa Tognon (SUI)	z			z	0T 2z	0	5	19
20	Angela Eckhardt (RSA)	z			z	0T 2z	0	10	20
21	Sarah Tetzlaff (NZL)	z				0T 1z	0	3	21

==== Lead ====
Rank	Athlete	Result	Time	Points
1	Sandra Lettner (AUT)	39		1
2	Vita Lukan (SLO)	38+	3:45	2
3	Nolwenn Arc (FRA)	38+	4:25	3
4	Laura Lammer (AUT)	34	2:21	4
5	Lučka Rakovec (SLO)	34	3:13	5
6	Elena Krasovskaia (RUS)	34	3:37	6
7	Hannah Meul (GER)	33+		7
8	Laura Rogora (ITA)	33		8
9	Mao Nakamura (JPN)	31+	2:29	9
10	Alejandra Contreras (CHI)	31+	2:59	10
11	Valentina Aguado (ARG)	30		11
12	Luiza Emeleva (RUS)	28+		12
13	Hannah Herrmann (SUI)	21+		13
14	Natalia Kałucka (POL)	19+		14
15	Lucile Saurel (FRA)	19	1:21	15
16	Aleksandra Kałucka (POL)	19	1:29	16
17	Angela Eckhardt (RSA)	18+	1:34	17
18	Annalisa Tognon (SUI)	18+	2:12	18
19	Catherine Carkner (CAN)	18		19
20	Narada Disyabut (THA)	16		20
21	Sarah Tetzlaff (NZL)	9+		21

==== Summary ====
Rank	Athlete	Speed	Boulder	Lead	Total
1	Sandra Lettner (AUT)	8	4	1	32
2	Vita Lukan (SLO)	17	3	2	102
3	Elena Krasovskaia (RUS)	3	6	6	108
4	Mao Nakamura (JPN)	14	1	9	126
5	Hannah Meul (GER)	10	2	7	140
6	Laura Lammer (AUT)	4	9	4	144
7	Aleksandra Kałucka (POL)	1	17	16	272
8	Natalia Kałucka (POL)	2	12	14	336
9	Valentina Aguado (ARG)	6	7	11	462
10	Laura Rogora (ITA)	13	5	8	520
11	Nolwenn Arc (FRA)	21	10	3	630
12	Alejandra Contreras (CHI)	5	14	10	700
13	Lučka Rakovec (SLO)	12	13	5	780
14	Luiza Emeleva (RUS)	9	8	12	864
15	Lucile Saurel (FRA)	7	11	15	1155
16	Narada Disyabut (THA)	11	15	20	3300
17	Hannah Herrmann (SUI)	15	18	13	3510
18	Catherine Carkner (CAN)	18	16	19	5472
19	Angela Eckhardt (RSA)	19	20	17	6460
20	Annalisa Tognon (SUI)	20	19	18	6840
21	Sarah Tetzlaff (NZL)	16	21	21	7056

=== Final ===
==== Speed ====
Quarterfinals

Rank	Athlete	Time	Note
1	Elena Krasovskaia (RUS)	9.64	Q
2	Vita Lukan (SLO)	Fall	
1	Laura Lammer (AUT)	9.52	Q
2	Mao Nakamura (JPN)	11.42	
1	Sandra Lettner (AUT)	10.53	Q
2	Hannah Meul (GER)	11.08	LL

Semifinals

Rank	Athlete	Time	Note
1	Elena Krasovskaia (RUS)	9.12	Q
2	Hannah Meul (GER)	11.54	
1	Laura Lammer (AUT)	9.24	Q
2	Sandra Lettner (AUT)	9.72	

Finals

Rank	Athlete	Time	Points
Final
1	Laura Lammer (AUT)	10.68	1
2	Elena Krasovskaia (RUS)	11.72	2
Small final
3	Sandra Lettner (AUT)	10.15	3
4	Hannah Meul (GER)	10.82	4
Results from quarterfinals
5	Mao Nakamura (JPN)		5
6	Vita Lukan (SLO)		6

==== Bouldering ====
Rank	Athlete	Boulder				Result	Attempts	Attempts to zone	Points
Rank	Athlete	1	2	3	4	Result	Attempts	Attempts to zone	Points
1	Vita Lukan (SLO)	T	T	T	T	4T 4z	12	12	1
2	Mao Nakamura (JPN)	T	T	T	T	4T 4z	13	10	2
3	Sandra Lettner (AUT)	T	T	T	T	4T 4z	14	11	3
4	Laura Lammer (AUT)	T	T	z	T	3T 4z	8	9	4
5	Hannah Meul (GER)	z	T	T	T	3T 4z	10	15	5
6	Elena Krasovskaia (RUS)	z		T	T	2T 3z	4	8	6

==== Lead ====
Rank	Athlete	Result	Time	Points
1	Hannah Meul (GER)	Top	3:43	1
2	Sandra Lettner (AUT)	Top	3:50	2
3	Vita Lukan (SLO)	Top	3:56	3
4	Elena Krasovskaia (RUS)	Top	4:09	4
5	Laura Lammer (AUT)	37+		5
6	Mao Nakamura (JPN)	29+		6

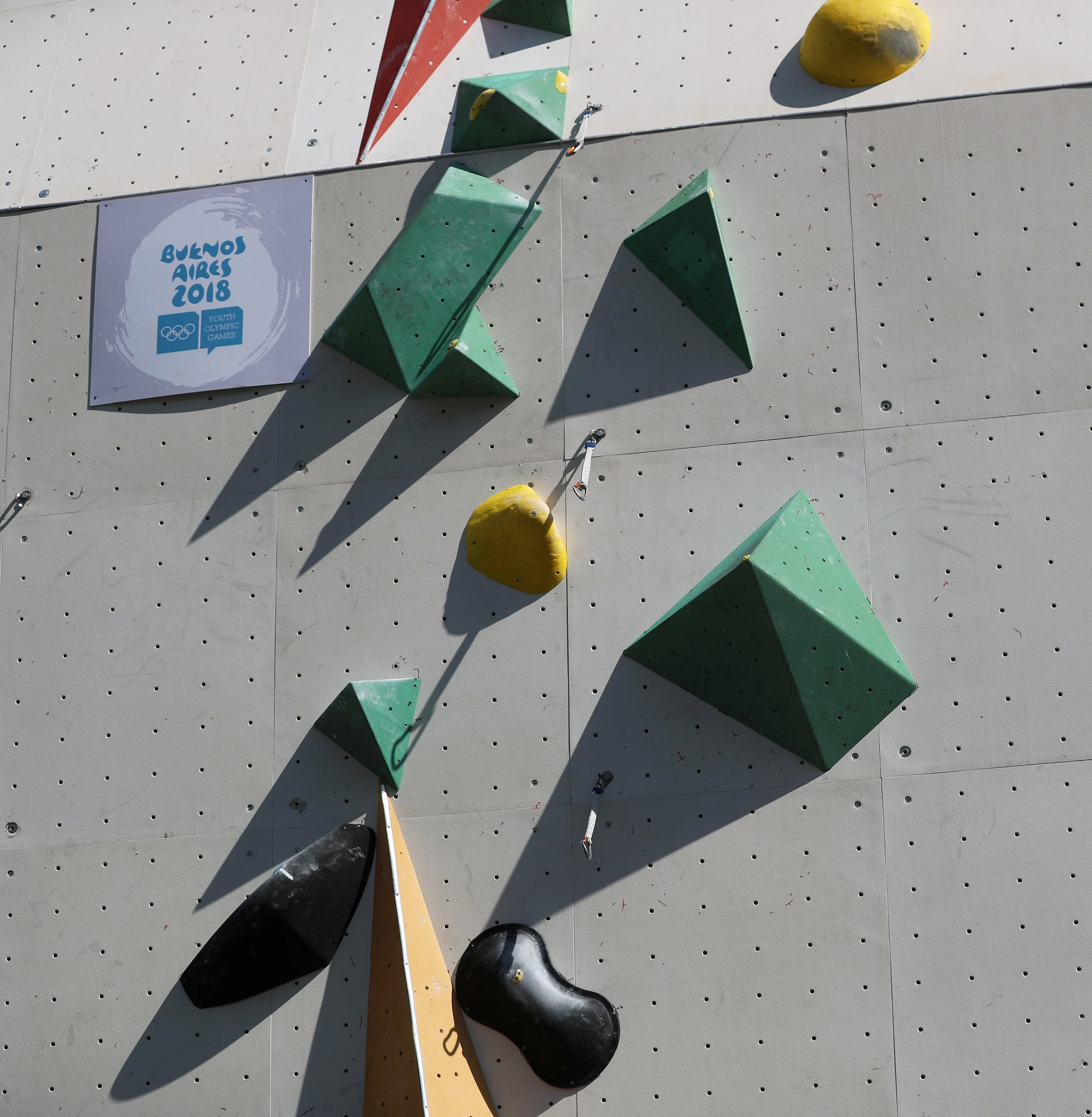
Lead climbing wall

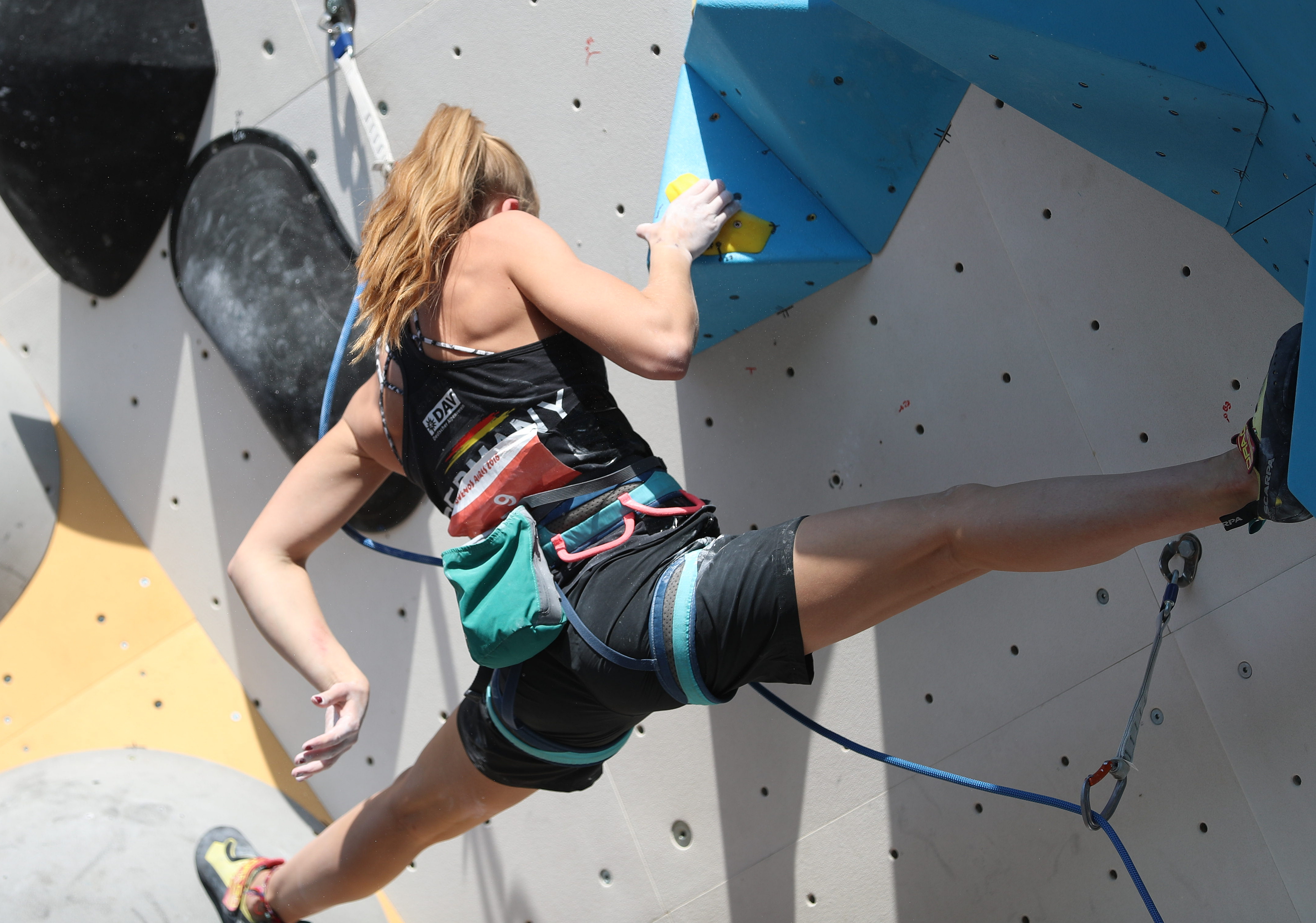
Hannah Meul

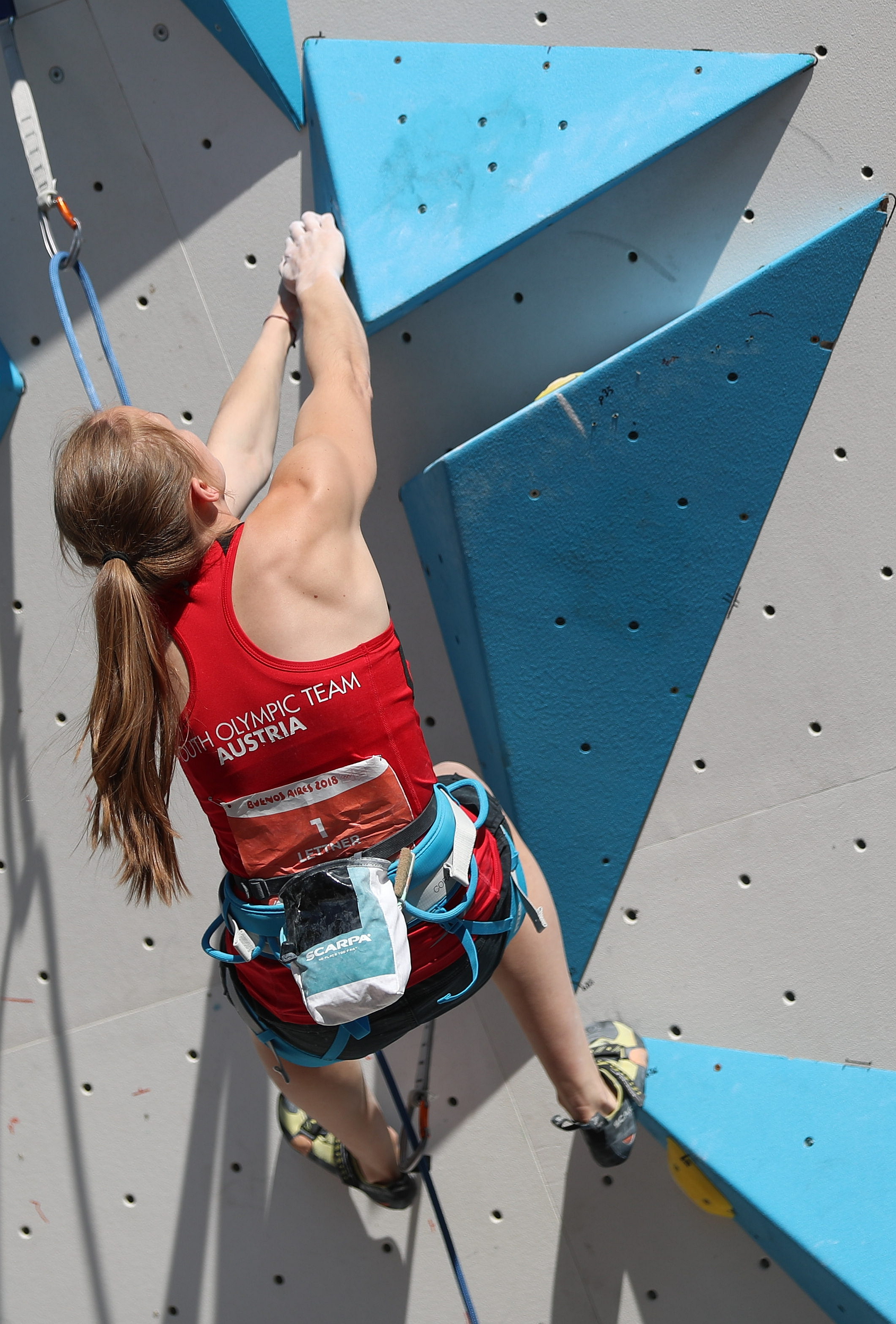
Sandra Lettner

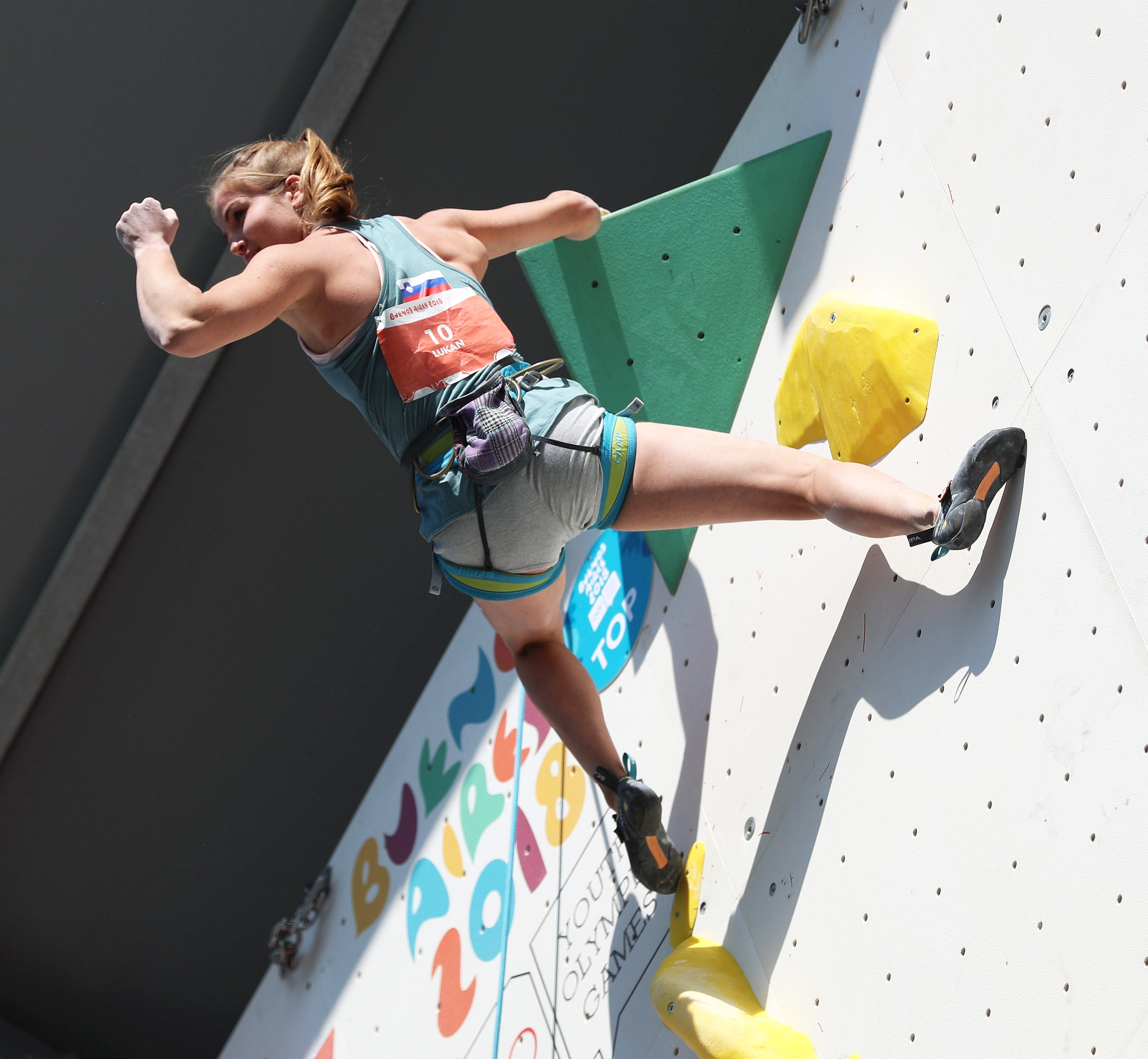
Vita Lukan

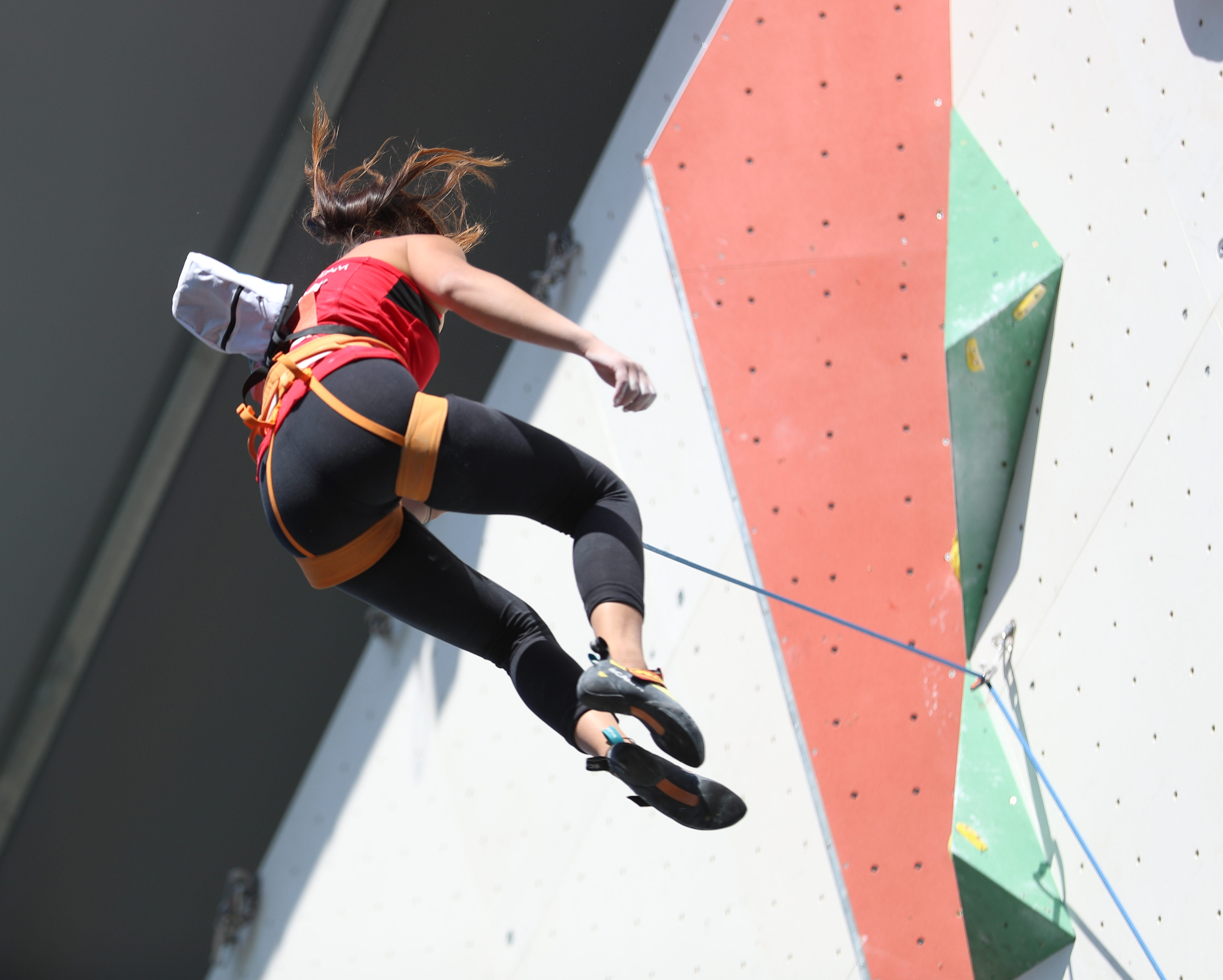
Laura Lammer

==== Summary ====
Rank	Athlete	Speed	Boulder	Lead	Total
1st place, gold medalist(s)	Sandra Lettner (AUT)	3	3	2	18
2nd place, silver medalist(s)	Vita Lukan (SLO)	6	1	3	18
3rd place, bronze medalist(s)	Laura Lammer (AUT)	1	4	5	20
4	Hannah Meul (GER)	4	5	1	20
5	Elena Krasovskaia (RUS)	2	6	4	48
6	Mao Nakamura (JPN)	5	2	6	60

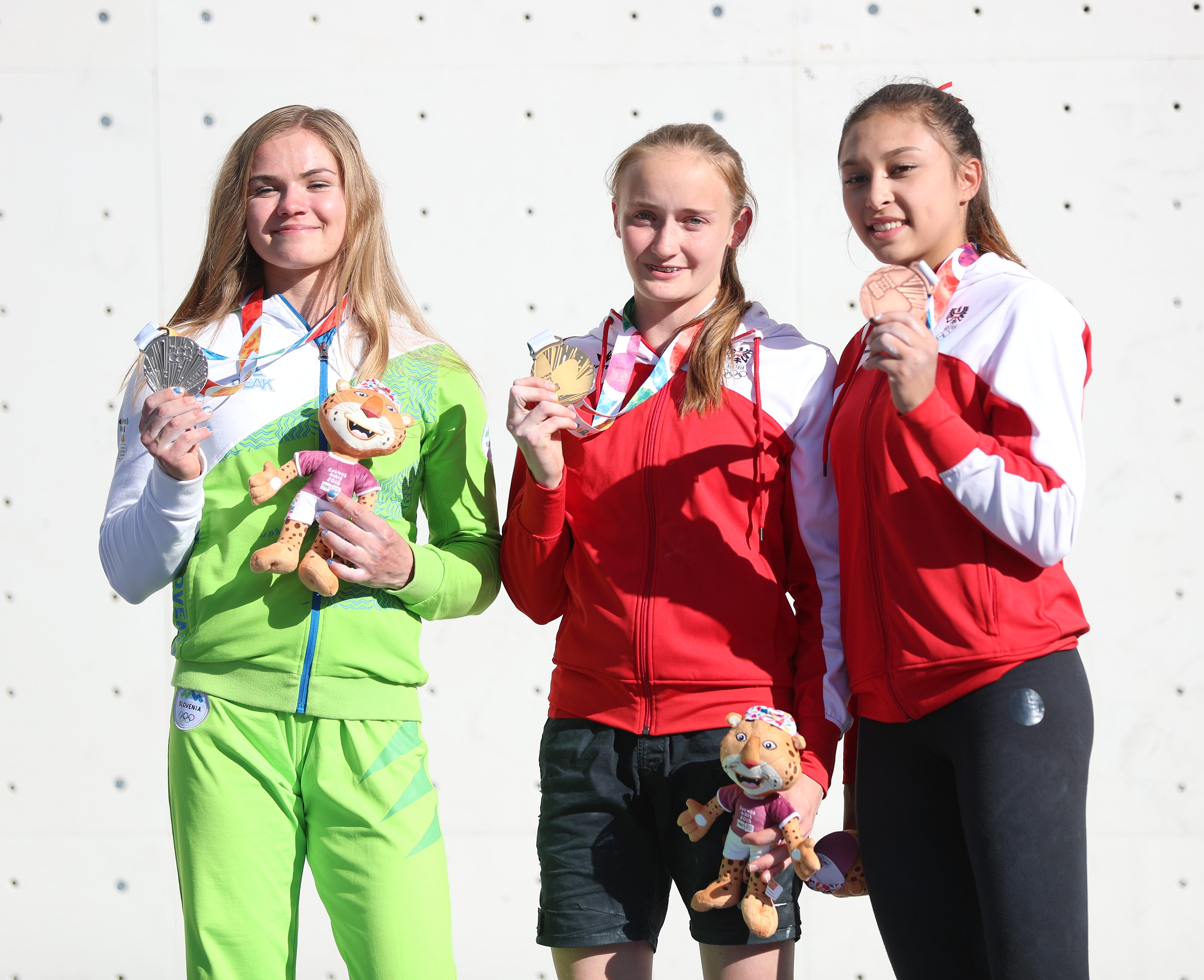
Victory ceremony
