= Bouldering at the 2022 IFSC Climbing World Cup =

- Location: Meiringen, Switzerland; Seoul, South Korea Salt Lake City, United States; Salt Lake City, United States; Brixen, Italy Innsbruck, Austria
- Dates: 8 April – 25 June 2022

Champions
- Men: (Japan) Yoshiyuki Ogata
- Women: (United States) Natalia Grossman

The 2022 season of the 2022 IFSC Climbing World Cup was the 23rd season of the competition. Bouldering competitions were held at six stops of the IFSC Climbing World Cup. The bouldering season began on April 8 at the World Cup in Meiringen, and concluded on June 25 with the World Cup in Innsbruck. At each stop a qualifying was held on the first day of the competition, and the semi-final and final rounds were conducted on the second day of the competition. The winners were awarded trophies, and the best three finishers received medals. At the end of the season an overall ranking was determined based upon points, which athletes were awarded for finishing in the top 40 of each individual event.

Natalia Grossman won the women's seasonal title. The men's seasonal title went to Yoshiyuki Ogata while Japan defended its title in the national teams competition.

== Overview ==
Date	Location	Routesetters*	Men	Women
April, 8-10	Meiringen, Switzerland	(France) **Laurent Laporte**; (United States) Garrett Gregor; (Japan) Gen Hirashima	(Japan) Tomoa Narasaki	(Slovenia) Janja Garnbret
May, 6-8	Seoul, South Korea	(Switzerland) **Manuel Hassler**; (Poland) Tomasz Oleksy; (Japan) Tsukasa Mizuguchi	(Japan) Kokoro Fujii	(United States) Natalia Grossman
May, 20-22	Salt Lake City, United States	(France) **Remi Samyn**; (Switzerland) Manuel Hassler; (Japan) Akito Matsushima	(France) Mejdi Schalck	(United States) Natalia Grossman
May, 27-29	Salt Lake City, United States	(France) **Romain Cabessut**; (Poland) Tomasz Oleksy; (Poland) Olga Niemiec	(Japan) Yoshiyuki Ogata	(United States) Natalia Grossman
June, 10-12	Brixen, Italy	(Poland) **Marcin Wszolek**; (France) Mathieu Dutray; (Japan) Tsukuru Hori	(Germany) Yannick Flohé	(United States) Natalia Grossman
June, 22-25	Innsbruck, Austria	(France) **Romain Cabessut**; (United States) Brad Weaver; (Australia) Tonde Katiyo	(United States) Colin Duffy	(United States) Natalia Grossman
**OVERALL WINNERS**			(Japan) **Yoshiyuki Ogata**	(United States) **Natalia Grossman**
**NATIONAL TEAM**			**Japan**	

* Chief routesetters are in bold.

== Overall ranking ==
The overall ranking is determined based upon points, which athletes are awarded for finishing in the top 40 of each individual event. The end-of-season standings are based on the sum of points earned from the five best finishes for each athlete. Results displayed (in brackets) are not counted. The national ranking is the sum of the points of that country's three best male and female athletes.

=== Men ===
The results of the ten most successful athletes of the Bouldering World Cup 2022:

Rank	Name	Points	Meiringen	Seoul	Salt Lake City I	Salt Lake City II	Brixen	Innsbruck
1	(Japan) Yoshiyuki Ogata	3990	2. 805	3. 690	2. 805	1. 1000	5. (545)	3. 690
2	(Japan) Tomoa Narasaki	3405	1. 1000	2. 805	7. 455	—	3. 690	7. 455
3	(Japan) Kokoro Fujii	3110	6. 495	1. 1000	14. (260)	3. 690	9. 380	5. 545
4	(Germany) Yannick Flohé	2475	—	—	5. 545	7. 435	1. 1000	6. 495
5	(France) Mejdi Schalck	2294	3. 690	7. 455	1. 1000	21. 137.5	—	43. 11.5
6	(United Kingdom) Maximillian Milne	2215	8. 415	8. 415	13. 280	12. 300	2. 805	14. (260)
7	(South Korea) Lee Dohyun	2128.5	41. 13.5	10. 350	—	10. 350	4. 610	2. 805
8	(United States) Colin Duffy	1976	5. 545	—	21. 137.5	13. 280	41. 13.5	1. 1000
9	(South Korea) Chon Jong-won	1957.5	21. 112.5	12. 300	—	4. 610	11. 325	4. 610
10	(Japan) Rei Kawamata	1774.5	31. 39.5	—	3. 690	5. 545	14. 260	15. 240

=== Women ===
The results of the ten most successful athletes of the Bouldering World Cup 2022:

Rank	Name	Points	Meiringen	Seoul	Salt Lake City I	Salt Lake City II	Brixen	Innsbruck
1	(United States) Natalia Grossman	5000	2. (805)	1. 1000	1. 1000	1. 1000	1. 1000	1. 1000
2	(Japan) Miho Nonaka	3210	26. (68)	8. 415	3. 690	2. 805	4. 610	3. 690
3	(United States) Brooke Raboutou	2940	12. 300	3. 690	2. 805	3. 690	—	7. 455
4	(Japan) Futaba Ito	2560	5. 545	15. (240)	9. 380	4. 610	8. 415	4. 610
5	(Germany) Hannah Meul	2345	7. 455	—	13. 280	—	2. 805	2. 805
6	(France) Oriane Bertone	2316.5	4. 610	2. 805	7. 455	8. 415	—	33. 31.5
7	(Austria) Jessica Pilz	2215	18. (185)	7. 455	4. 610	13. 280	7. 455	8. 415
8	(Serbia) Staša Gejo	2195	6. 495	4. 610	8. 415	11. 325	10. 350	16. (220)
9	(South Korea) Seo Chae-hyun	1930	17. (205)	14. 260	5. 545	12. 300	13. 280	5. 545
10	(Italy) Camilla Moroni	1820	13. 280	5. 545	6. 495	17. (205)	16. 220	13. 280

* = Joint place with another athlete

=== National Teams ===
The results of the ten most successful countries of the Bouldering World Cup 2022:

Country names as used by the IFSC

Rank	Name	Points	Meiringen	Seoul	Salt Lake City	Salt Lake City	Brixen	Innsbruck
1	Japan	20783	3013	3645	3260	4000	3485	3380
2	United States	15223	2385	2204	3045	3030	3198	1361
3	France	10175.5	2820	2585	1550	940	1218.5	1062
4	Austria	8194	795	1120	2415	1108	1068	1688
5	Germany	8141.5	960	719	1340	944	1797.5	2381
6	(South Korea) Korea	6994.5	614	1112	-	1679	2323.5	1266
7	Slovenia	5979.5	1885	721	616	1225	662.5	870
8	United Kingdom	5353.5	520	662	689	1383	763.5	1336
9	Italy	3893.16	340	724	992	780	569.66	487.5
10	Israel	2678.5	293	145.5	462	628	540	610

== Meiringen, Switzerland (8-10 April) ==
=== Women ===
83 athletes attended the World Cup in Meiringen. Janja Garnbret won the competition ahead of Natalia Grossman as the only athlete to get 4 tops. Garnbret was the only athlete to top the technical boulder 1 in the final. Andrea Kümin completed the podium, earning her first IFSC World Cup medal.

Rank	Name	Score
1	(Slovenia) Janja Garnbret	4T4z 5 5
2	(United States) Natalia Grossman	3T4z 8 16
3	(Switzerland) Andrea Kümin	1T2z 1 3
4	(France) Oriane Bertone	1T2z 1 5
5	(Japan) Futaba Ito	0T2z 0 8
6	(Serbia) Stasa Gejo	0T1z 0 3

=== Men ===
112 athletes attended the World Cup in Meiringen. Tomoa Narasaki took the win. In the final, the top 4 finishers, including Yoshiyuki Ogata and Mejdi Schalck, had similar results — 2 tops and 3 zones — with attempts deciding the podium. Boulder 3 saw athletes attempting an unintended face-in starting position. Controversy ensued when a judge's late call on Colin Duffy's incorrect starting position on boulder 3 resulted in Duffy's 19 attempts to top. He was one of two athletes to top boulder 3.

Rank	Name	Score
1	(Japan) Tomoa Narasaki	2T3z 3 6
2	(Japan) Yoshiyuki Ogata	2T3z 5 19
3	(France) Mejdi Schalck	2T3z 7 9
4	(France) Paul Jenft	2T3z 15 18
5	(United States) Colin Duffy	1T4z 19 27
6	(Japan) Kokoro Fujii	1T3z 4 27

== Seoul, South Korea (6-8 May) ==
=== Women ===
55 athletes attended the World Cup in Seoul. Natalia Grossman won the competition. A high-scoring final round meant that athletes needed at least 3 tops to reach the podium. Grossman was the only athlete to top all boulders in the qualification, semifinal and final rounds. Oriane Bertone and Brooke Raboutou finished second and third respectively.

Rank	Name	Score
1	(United States) Natalia Grossman	4T4z 7 5
2	(France) Oriane Bertone	3T4z 5 5
3	(United States) Brooke Raboutou	3T3z 6 5
4	(Serbia) Stasa Gejo	2T4z 3 13
5	(Italy) Camilla Moroni	1T2z 6 8
6	(Japan) Mia Aoyagi	0T3z 0 4

=== Men ===
53 athletes attended the World Cup in Seoul. The Japanese team dominated the finals and swept the podium, securing five of the six finalist spots. In the final, world champion Kokoro Fujii won the competition with four tops — finishing ahead of compatriot Tomoa Narasaki having used 1 less attempt to top. This marked Fujii's return to the top spot at a World Cup since Chongqing 2018. Yoshiyuki Ogata placed third.

Rank	Name	Score
1	(Japan) Kokoro Fujii	4T4z 11 4
2	(Japan) Tomoa Narasaki	4T4z 12 8
3	(Japan) Yoshiyuki Ogata	3T4z 6 7
4	(France) Paul Jenft	2T4z 4 11
5	(Japan) Meichi Narasaki	2T3z 3 6
6	(Japan) Keita Dohi	1T4z 2 14

== Salt Lake City, United States (20-22 May) ==
=== Women ===
58 athletes attended the World Cup in Salt Lake City. Last year's winner Natalia Grossman was the only athlete to achieve 4 tops.Brooke Raboutou won silver over Miho Nonaka.

Rank	Name	Score
1	(United States) Natalia Grossman	4T4z 9 9
2	(United States) Brooke Raboutou	3T4z 5 14
3	(Japan) Miho Nonaka	3T4z 9 18
4	(Austria) Jessica Pilz	3T4z 16 19
5	(Austria) Franziska Sterrer	1T3z 1 7
6	(Italy) Camilla Moroni	1T3z 2 21

=== Men ===
69 athletes attended the World Cup in Salt Lake City. Seoul winner Kokoro Fujii failed to advance past the semifinals. In the final, Mejdi Schalck and Yoshiyuki Ogata topped all the boulders in the finals, but Schalck won the gold medal based on attempts. Ogata won silver and Rei Kawamata bronze, claiming his first IFSC World Cup bronze medal.

Rank	Name	Score
1	(France) Mejdi Schalck	4T4z 9 6
2	(Japan) Yoshiyuki Ogata	4T4z 11 10
3	(Japan) Rei Kawamata	3T4z 14 12
4	(Austria) Nicolai Uznik	2T3z 8 10
5	(Germany) Yannick Flohé	1T4z 1 10
6	(Austria) Jakob Schubert	1T2z 1 6

== Salt Lake City, United States (27-29 May) ==
=== Women ===
53 athletes attended the World Cup in Salt Lake City. Seo Chae-hyun and Ayala Kerem made their first boulder World Cup final. Natalia Grossman won her third consecutive World Cup of the boulder season. Grossman was the only athlete to top all 4 boulders in the final. In a repeat podium from the previous week, Miho Nonaka and Brooke Raboutou won silver and bronze respectively.

Rank	Name	Score
1	(United States) Natalia Grossman	4T4z 10 4
2	(Japan) Miho Nonaka	3T4z 5 5
3	(United States) Brooke Raboutou	3T4z 6 4
4	(Japan) Futaba Ito	3T4z 9 9
5	(South Korea) Seo Chae-hyun	2T4z 2 8
6	(Israel) Ayala Kerem	2T4z 3 8

=== Men ===
71 athletes attended the World Cup in Salt Lake City. In the final, Yoshiyuki Ogata and Anze Peharc had identical scores, having topped all four boulders in 5 attempts. Ogata won gold over Peharc by virtue of his better semifinal performance. Kokoro Fujii finished third.

Rank	Name	Score
1	(Japan) Yoshiyuki Ogata	4T4z 5 5
2	(Slovenia) Anze Peharc	4T4z 5 5
3	(Japan) Kokoro Fujii	4T4z 9 8
4	(South Korea) Chon Jong-won	3T4z 4 5
5	(Japan) Rei Kawamata	3T3z 7 6
6	(United States) Ross Fulkerson	2T2z 4 3

== Brixen, Italy (10-12 June) ==
=== Women ===
80 athletes attended the World Cup in Brixen. Natalia Grossman won the competition, topping all the boulders in the competition. Hannah Meul took the silver — her first boulder World Cup medal. Luo Zhilu won bronze, securing her first World Cup medal in her debut World Cup.

Rank	Name	Score
1	(United States) Natalia Grossman	4T4z 6 5
2	(Germany) Hannah Meul	4T4z 6 6
3	(China) Luo Zhilu	2T4z 5 9
4	(Japan) Miho Nonaka	1T4z 1 4
5	(Japan) Anon Matsufuji	1T3z 4 6
6	(Japan) Serika Okawachi	0T3z 0 8

=== Men ===
99 athletes attended the World Cup in Brixen. A powerful set of final boulders saw each finalist secure no more than 2 tops. Yannick Flohé was the only athlete to get 2 tops and 2 zones in the final, winning his first World Cup. Few attempts to tops and zones proved important for the podium as attempts to zones decided 3rd and 4th place. Maximillian Milne scored his first World Cup medal, taking silver while Tomoa Narasaki placed third.

Rank	Name	Score
1	(Germany) Yannick Flohé	2T4z 5 9
2	(United Kingdom) Maximillian Milne	2T3z 6 9
3	(Japan) Tomoa Narasaki	1T4z 4 9
4	(South Korea) Lee Dohyun	1T4z 4 22
5	(Japan) Yoshiyuki Ogata	1T4z 7 13
6	(Japan) Meichi Narasaki	1T3z 2 8

== Innsbruck, Austria (22-26 June) ==
=== Women ===
97 athletes attended the World Cup in Innsbruck. Natalia Grossman and Hannah Meul repeated their top 2 finish in Brixen by topping all four final boulders, with attempts determining Grossman's gold over Meul. Miho Nonaka finished third. With five consecutive World Cup wins in the season, Grossman comfortably won the 2022 overall boulder World Cup title over Miho Nonaka and Brooke Raboutou.

Rank	Name	Score
1	(United States) Natalia Grossman	4T4z 5 5
2	(Germany) Hannah Meul	4T4z 7 6
3	(Japan) Miho Nonaka	2T2z 3 2
4	(Japan) Futaba Ito	1T2z 1 2
5	(South Korea) Seo Chae-hyun	1T2z 1 3
6	(Japan) Saki Kikuchi	0T2z 0 2

=== Men ===
135 athletes attended the World Cup in Innsbruck. Colin Duffy bested experienced boulderers in the final to win his first World Cup. Lee Dohyun won his first World Cup silver medal and Yoshiyuki Ogata took bronze. Ogata's consistent performance in 2022 - never placing lower than fifth all season - saw him win the overall boulder World Cup title over compatriots Tomoa Narasaki and Kokoro Fujii.

Rank	Name	Score
1	(United States) Colin Duffy	3T4z 12 9
2	(South Korea) Lee Dohyun	2T4z 10 12
3	(Japan) Yoshiyuki Ogata	2T4z 10 14
4	(South Korea) Chon Jong-won	2T3z 2 3
5	(Japan) Kokoro Fujii	2T3z 3 4
6	(Germany) Yannick Flohé	2T3z 7 7
