= Mejdi Schalck =

French rock climber

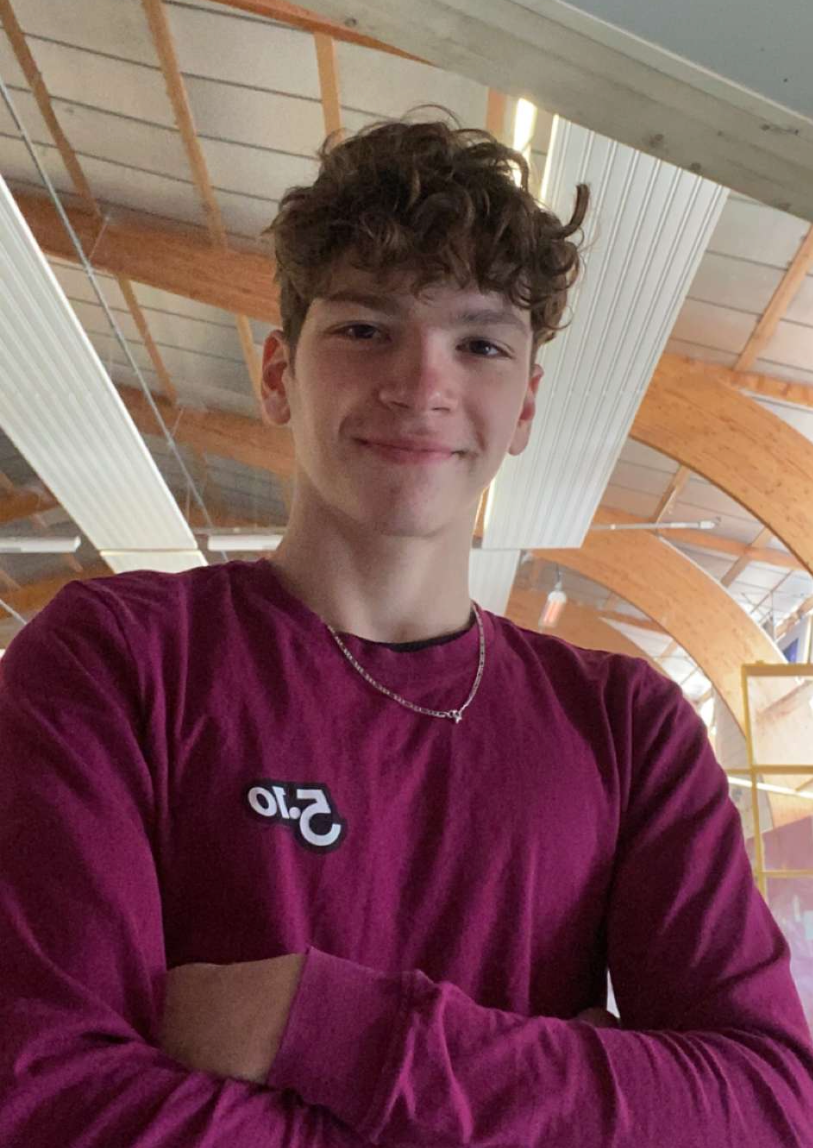
- Schalck in 2022

Personal information
- Nationality: France
- Born: Montreuil, France
- Height: 172 cm (5 ft 8 in)

Climbing career
- Type of climber: Competition climbing
- Ape index: +8 cm (3 in)
- Highest grade: 8C (Boulder) and 9a+ (Sport)
Medal record
Men's competition climbing
Representing France
World Championships
Silver medal – second place	Seoul 2025	Boulder
Silver medal – second place	Bern 2023	Boulder
World Cup (Overall)
Second place	2025	Boulder
Third place	2026	Bouldering
World Cup
Gold medal – first place	Prague 2025	Boulder
Gold medal – first place	Seoul 2023	Boulder
Gold medal – first place	Hachioji 2023	Boulder
Gold medal – first place	Salt Lake City 2022	Boulder
Silver medal – second place	Bern 2026	Boulder
Silver medal – second place	Bern 2025	Boulder
Silver medal – second place	Curitiba 2025	Boulder
Silver medal – second place	Salt Lake City 2021	Boulder
Bronze medal – third place	Prague 2026	Boulder
Bronze medal – third place	Keqiao 2026	Boulder
Bronze medal – third place	Prague 2023	Boulder
Bronze medal – third place	Meiringen 2022	Boulder
World Games
Bronze medal – third place	Birmingham 2022	Lead

Mejdi Schalck is a French rock climber who specialises in competition climbing. He won the bronze medal in the men's lead event at the 2022 World Games. Schalck also competed at the 2022 European Championships in the multi-sport tournament of the 2022 IFSC Climbing European Championships, finishing 4th place in the men's competition bouldering event, and 15th place in the men's competition lead climbing event.

== Rankings ==
=== World Cup ===
Discipline	2021	2022	2023	2024	2025	2026
Boulder	5	5	5	20	2	3

=== World Championships ===
Discipline	Moscow 2021	Bern 2023	Seoul 2025
Boulder	13	2	2
Lead	-	11	-
Boulder & Lead	-	9	-

=== World Youth Championships ===
Discipline	2021 Youth A
Boulder	4
Lead	2

== Number of medals at the IFSC Climbing World Cup ==
=== Boulder ===
Season	Gold	Silver	Bronze	Total
2021		1		1
2022	1		1	2
2023	2		1	3
2025	1	2		3
2026		1	2	3
Total	4	4	4	12

== Notable ascents ==
=== Boulder problems ===
8C (V15):

- Power of Now Direct - Magic Wood (SUI) - 2026
- Sleepwalker - Black Velvet Canyon (USA) - 2025
- Defying Gravity - Thunder Ridge (USA) - 2025
- La Force Tranquille - Magic Wood (SUI) - 2025
- The Big Island - Coquibus Rumont (FRA) - 2024

8B+ (V14):

- Casavino - Brione (SUI) - 2025 - flash
- La Force du Destin - Fontainebleau (FRA) - 2025
- Mystic Stylez - Magic Wood (SUI) - 2025
- Practice of the Wild - Magic Wood (SUI) - 2025
- L'Alchemiste - Apremont (FRA) - 2024
- Gecko Assis - Fontainebleau (FRA) - 2024
- The Reckoning - Squamish (CAN) - 2024
- Deadlift - Squamish (CAN) - 2024
- Off the Wagon - Val Bavona (SUI) - 2022
- Mécanique Élémentaire - Recloses (FRA) - 2021

=== Redpointed routes ===
9a+ (5.15a):

- Es Pontàs - Mallorca (ESP) - 2024

9a (5.14d):

- Dreamcatcher - Squamish (CAN) - 2024
- Bio Sharma Graphie L2 - Rocher de Beverau (FRA) - 2023
