= Sport climbing at the 2018 Summer Youth Olympics =

Sport climbing at the III Summer Youth Olympic Games
- Venue: Parque Urbano
- Dates: 7–10 October
- No. of events: 2 (1 boys, 1 girls)
- Competitors: 42 (21 boys, 21 girls)

Sport climbing at the 2018 Summer Youth Olympics was held from 7 to 10 October. The competition took place at the Parque Urbano in Puerto Madero, Buenos Aires, Argentina. This marked the debut of the sport at the Youth Olympics.

== Qualification ==
Each National Olympic Committee (NOC) could enter a maximum of 4 competitors, 2 per each gender event. As hosts, Argentina was given 2 quotas, 1 per each gender event provided that they participate at the Youth World Championships. A further 2 quotas, 1 in each gender could be allocated by the Tripartite Commission. The remaining 36 places shall be decided in two qualification phases; the 2017 Youth World Championship and five continental championships.

Shortly before the deadline for entries in September, The IOC informed the IFSC 1 additional female athlete and 1 additional male athlete were added to the quota for Sport Climbing, raising the number of qualified athletes to 21 female athletes and 21 male athletes.

To be eligible to participate at the Youth Olympics athletes needed to have been born between 1 January 2000 and 31 December 2001.

Although two athletes from the United States, Ashima Shiraishi and Brooke Raboutou, finished second and third at the Youth World Championship and were included on preliminary lists of qualified athletes, the United States Olympic Committee declined to allow them to participate, citing a fixed limit on the total number of athletes that it could send to all events, and a low prioritization of the climbing event based on the fact that USA Climbing had applied for recognition by the USOC but not yet received it. Similarly, Chinese female athlete Song Yi Ling qualified through the Youth World Championship but was not included on the final starting list of athletes for the Youth Olympics.

The qualified athletes were as follows:

=== Boys ===
Event	Location	Date	Total Places	Qualified
Host Nation	-	-	0 ~~1~~	~~Argentina~~
2017 World Youth Championship	(Austria) Innsbruck	30 Aug–10 Sept 2017	15	Sam Avezou (FRA) Filip Schenk (ITA); Petar Ivanov (BUL); Nathan Martin (FRA); Keita Dohi (JPN); Shuta Tanaka (JPN); YuFei Pan (CHN); DiChong Huang (CHN); Mikel Asier Linacisoro Molina (ESP); Peter Kuric (SVK); Seongmin Eom (KOR); Nicolai Uznik (AUT); Mark Chan Chong Kiat (SGP); Lukas Franckaert (BEL); Donghyun Jang (KOR)
2017 Asian Youth Championship	Singapore	5–9 July 2017	1	Bharath Pereira (IND)
2017 Oceania Youth Championship	(New Caledonia) Nouméa	13–15 October 2017	1	Ned Middlehurst (AUS)
2017 Pan American Youth Championship	(Canada) Montreal	30 Oct–5 Nov 2017	2	Galo Hernandez (ECU); Rivadeneira Nickolaie (ECU)
2017 European Youth Championship	(France) Saint-Étienne	25–26 November 2017	1	Yaroslav Tkach (UKR)
2017 African Youth Championship	(South Africa) Johannesburg	8 December 2017	1	David Naudé (RSA)
TOTAL			21	

=== Girls ===
Event	Location	Date	Total Places	Qualified
Host Nation	-	-	1	Valentina Aguado (ARG)
2017 World Youth Championship	(Austria) Innsbruck	30 Aug–10 Sept 2017	14	Sandra Lettner (AUT); Elena Krasovskaia (RUS); Laura Rogora (ITA); Laura Lammer (AUT); Luiza Emeleva (RUS); Aleksandra Kałucka (POL); Lučka Rakovec (SLO); Hannah Meul (GER); Vita Lukan (SLO); Lucile Saurel (FRA); Annalisa Tognon (SUI); Hannah Hermann (SUI); Natalia Kałucka (POL); Narada Disyabut (THA)
2017 Asian Youth Championship	Singapore	5–9 July 2017	1	Mao Nakamura (JPN)
2017 Oceania Youth Championship	(New Caledonia) Nouméa	13–15 October 2017	1	Sarah Tetzlaff (NZL)
2017 Pan American Youth Championship	(Canada) Montreal	30 Oct–5 Nov 2017	2	Alejandra Contreras (CHI); Cat Carkner (CAN)
2017 European Youth Championship	(France) Saint-Étienne	25–26 November 2017	1	Nolwenn Arc (FRA)
2017 African Youth Championship	(South Africa) Johannesburg	8 December 2017	1	Angela Eckhardt (RSA)
TOTAL			21	

== Schedule ==
The competition followed the Olympic format, with each athlete competing in Speed, Bouldering and then Lead. The ranking was calculated by multiplying the placing in the individual events, with a lower combined score resulting in a better ranking. The top 6 ranked athletes progressed to the final.

Q	Qualifiers	F	Final

Event ↓ / Date →	Sun 7	Mon 8	Tue 9	Wed 10
Girls' Combined	Q		F	
Boys' Combined		Q		F

== Medal summary ==
=== Medal table ===
Rank	Nation	Gold	Silver	Bronze	Total
1	Japan	1	1	0	2
2	Austria	1	0	1	2
3	Slovenia	0	1	0	1
4	France	0	0	1	1
Totals (4 entries)		2	2	2	6

=== Events ===
Event	Gold	Silver	Bronze
Boys' combined	Keita Dohi; Japan	Shuta Tanaka; Japan	Sam Avezou; France
Girls' combined	Sandra Lettner; Austria	Vita Lukan; Slovenia	Laura Lammer; Austria

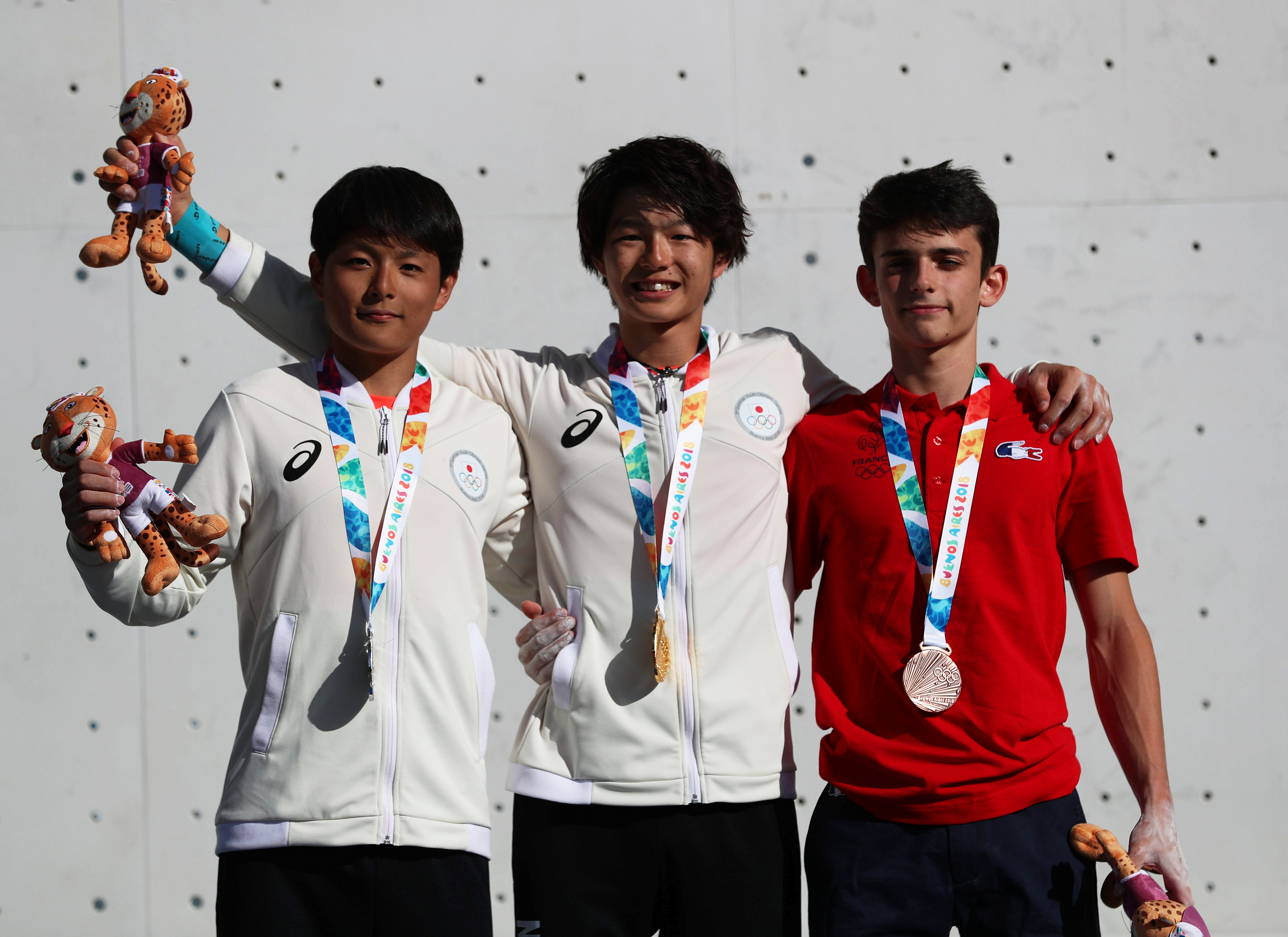
Boys' combined victory ceremony

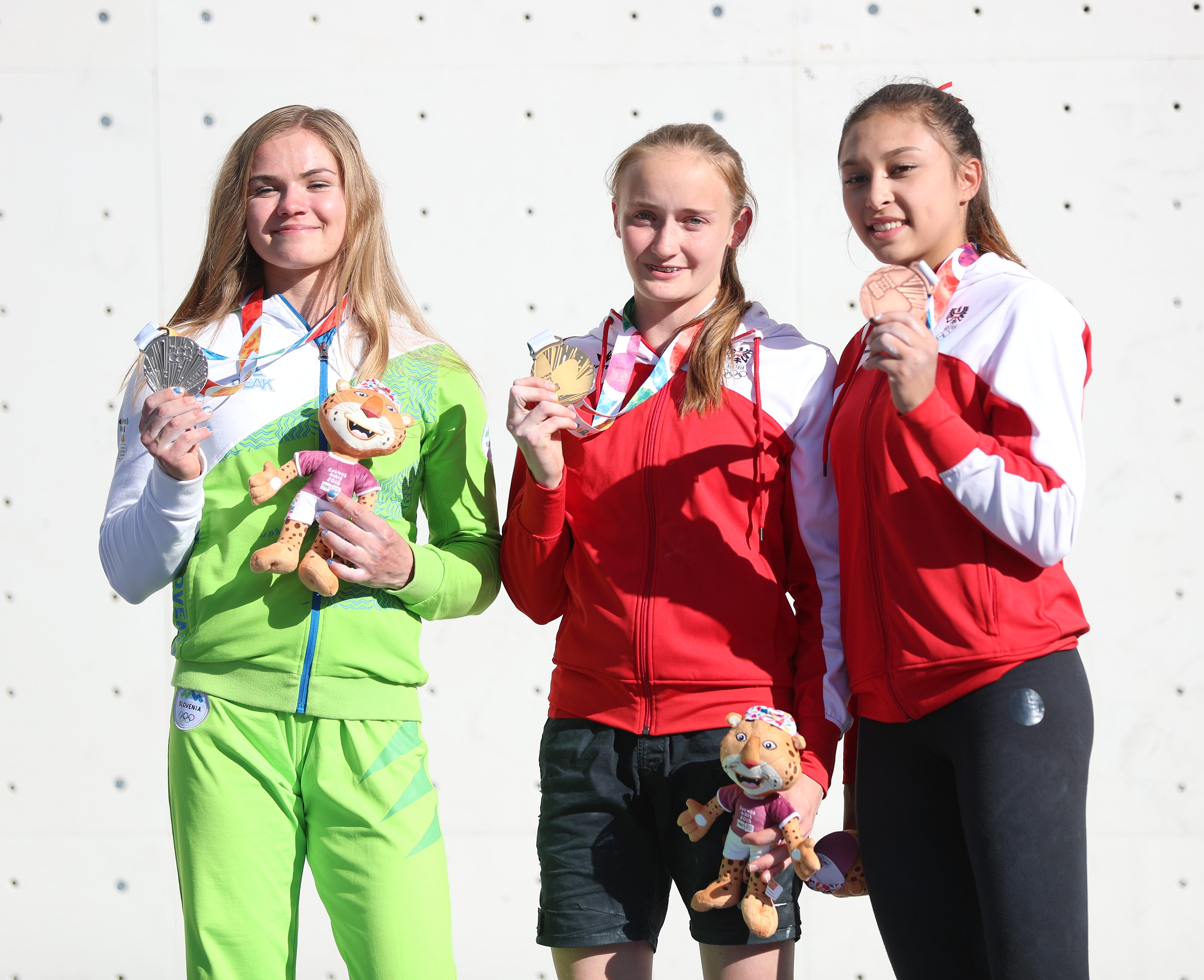
Girls' combined victory ceremony
