= Slovenia at the 2018 Summer Youth Olympics =

- IOC code: SLO
- NOC: Slovenian Olympic Committee
- Website: http://www.olympic.si/

in Buenos Aires, Argentina 6 – 18 October 2018
- Competitors: 26 in 15 sports
- Medals Ranked 32nd: Gold 2 Silver 2 Bronze 5 Total 9

Summer Youth Olympics appearances
- 2010; 2014; 2018; 2026

Slovenia participated at the 2018 Summer Youth Olympics in Buenos Aires, Argentina from 6 October to 18 October 2018.

== Medalists ==
Medals awarded to participants of mixed-NOC teams are represented in italics. These medals are not counted towards the individual NOC medal tally.

Medal	Name	Sport	Event	Date
Gold	Lan Tominc	Canoeing	K1 slalom	16 October
Gold	Kaja Juvan	Tennis	Girls' singles	14 October
Gold	Kaja Juvan	Tennis	Girls' doubles	13 October
Silver	Toni Vodišek	Sailing	IKA Twin Tip Racing	13 October
Silver	Vita Lukan	Sport climbing	Girls' combined	15 October
Bronze	Jan Razdevšek; Dan Osrečki; Erik Groznik; Adrian Hirschmann	Basketball	Boys' tournament	17 October
Bronze	Metka Lobnik	Judo	Girls' 78 kg	9 October
Bronze	Metka Lobnik	Judo	Mixed team	10 October
Bronze	Neža Klančar	Swimming	50 m freestyle	12 October
Bronze	Neža Klančar	Swimming	100 m freestyle	9 October
Bronze	Tina Čelik	Swimming	50 metre breaststroke	8 October

Medals by sport
Sport	1st place, gold medalist(s)	2nd place, silver medalist(s)	3rd place, bronze medalist(s)	Total
Basketball	0	0	1	1
Canoeing	1	0	0	1
Judo	0	0	1	1
Sailing	0	1	0	1
Sport Climbing	0	1	0	1
Swimming	0	0	3	3
Tennis	1	0	0	1
Total	2	2	5	9

== Competitors ==
Sport	Boys	Girls	Total
Athletics	1	2	3
Badminton	0	1	1
Basketball	4	0	4
Canoeing	1	0	1
Cycling	2	0	2
Judo	1	1	2
Rowing	0	1	1
Sailing	1	0	1
Shooting	0	1	1
Sport climbing	0	2	2
Swimming	2	2	4
Table tennis	0	1	1
Taekwondo	1	0	1
Tennis	0	1	1
Triathlon	1	0	1
Total	14	12	26

== Athletics ==
Boys

Athlete	Event	Stage 1		Stage 2		Total	
Athlete	Event	Result	Rank	Result	Rank	Total	Rank
Mitja Kordež	Boys' 200 metres	22.00	17	21.68	17	43.68	18

Girls

Athlete	Event	Stage 1		Stage 2		Total	
Athlete	Event	Result	Rank	Result	Rank	Total	Rank
Leja Glojnarič	Girls' high jump	1.65	14	1.72	12	3.37	15
Tjaša Zajc	Girls' shot put	12.77	15	13.35	13	26.12	14

== Badminton ==
Slovenia qualified one player based on the Badminton Junior World Rankings.

Singles

Athlete	Event	Group stage				Quarterfinal	Semifinal	Final / BM	Rank
Athlete	Event	Opposition Score	Opposition Score	Opposition Score	Rank	Opposition Score	Opposition Score	Opposition Score	Rank
Petra Polanc	Girls' Singles	Gynga (MDA); L 1–2	Sándorházi (HUN); L 0–2	—N/a	3	did not advance			9

Team

Athlete	Event	Group stage				Quarterfinal	Semifinal	Final / BM	Rank
Athlete	Event	Opposition Score	Opposition Score	Opposition Score	Rank	Opposition Score	Opposition Score	Opposition Score	Rank
Team Delta; Petra Polanc (SLO); Mateo Delmastro (ARG); Arnaud Merklé (FRA); Dmitriy Panarin (KAZ); Balázs Pápai (HUN); Elena Andreu (ESP); Pattarasuda Chaiwan (THA); Madouc Linders (NED)	Mixed Teams	Zeta (MIX); W (110–95)	Alpha (MIX); W (110–99)	Epsilon (MIX); L (108–110)	1Q	Theta (MIX); L (93–110)	did not advance		5

== Basketball ==
Slovenia qualified a boys' team based on the U18 3x3 National Federation Ranking.

- Boys' tournament - 1 team of 4 athletes

Boys' tournament

Event	Group stage					Quarterfinal	Semifinal	Final / BM	
Event	Opposition Score	Opposition Score	Opposition Score	Opposition Score	Rank	Opposition Score	Opposition Score	Opposition Score	Rank
Boys' tournament	Georgia; W W/O	China; W 21-18	Turkmenistan; W 20-6	Jordan; W 22-4	2	Russia; W 15-14	Belgium; L 12-14	Ukraine; W 21-13	3rd place, bronze medalist(s)

Dunk contest

Athlete	Event	Qualification				Semifinal				Final				
Athlete	Event	Round 1	Round 2	Total	Rank	Round 1	Round 2	Total	Rank	Round 1	Round 2	Round 3	Total	Rank
Dan Osrečki	Dunk contest	21	21	42	7	did not advance								

== Canoeing ==
Slovenia qualified one boat based on its performance at the 2018 World Qualification Event.

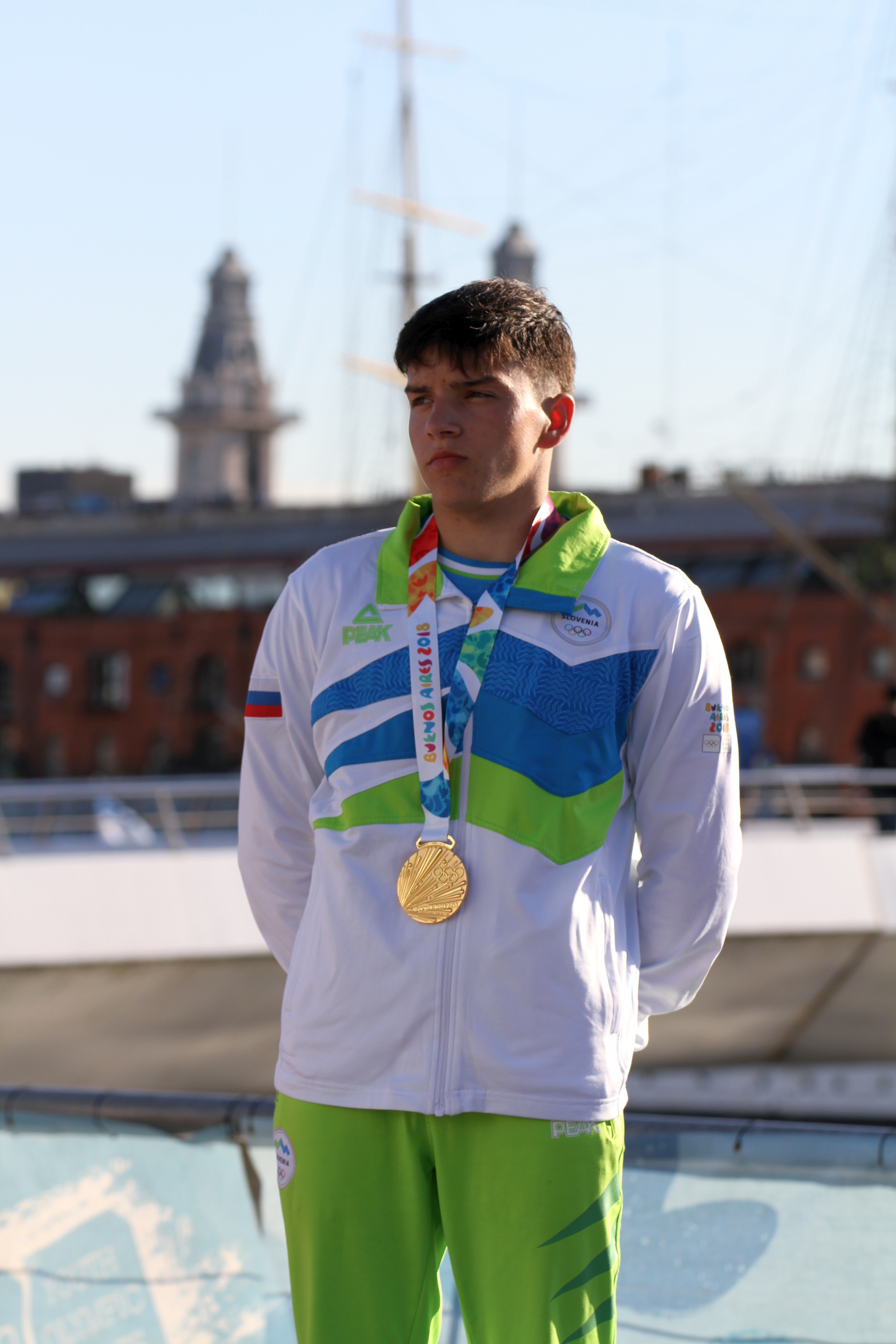
Lan Tominc at the K1 slalom Victory ceremony

- Boys' K1 - 1 boat

Boys

Athlete	Event	Qualification		Repechage		Quarterfinals	Semifinals	Final / BM	Rank
Athlete	Event	Time	Rank	Time	Rank	Opposition Result	Opposition Result	Opposition Result	Rank
Lan Tominc	K1 sprint	1:55.95	12 R	1:58.29	7	did not advance			
Lan Tominc	K1 slalom	1:10.69	2 Q	—N/a		Rossi (ARG); W 1:10.96	Bouchardon (FRA); W 1:09.34	Changheng (CHN); W 1:08.95	1st place, gold medalist(s)

== Cycling ==
Slovenia qualified a boys' combined team based on its ranking in the Youth Olympic Games Junior Nation Rankings.

- Boys' combined team - 1 team of 2 athletes

Athlete	Event	Team time trial			Road race			XC eliminator		XC short circuit			Criterium				Total	
Athlete	Event	Time	Rank	Points	Time	Rank	Points	Rank	Points	Time	Rank	Points	Laps	Sprint pts	Rank	Points	Points	Rank
Anže Skok	Boys' combined team	8:54.63	8	20	1:31:03	9	15	20	0	17:29	13	0	16	0	31	0	60	13
Aljaz Omrzel	Boys' combined team	8:54.63	8	20	1:31:03	25	0	38	0	18:21	16	0	16	3	7	25	60	13

== Judo ==
Individual

Athlete	Event	Round of 16	Quarterfinals	Semifinals	Rep 1	Rep 2	Rep 3	Final / BM	
Athlete	Event	Opposition Result	Opposition Result	Opposition Result	Opposition Result	Opposition Result	Opposition Result	Opposition Result	Rank
Rok Pogorevc	Boys' 100 kg	Ilia Sulamanidze (GEO); L 00s1-10	did not advance		Bye	Wu Xiao-zhang (TPE); W 10s1-000	Joaquín Burgos (ARG); W 10-00s1	Zsombor Vég (HUN); L 00-10	4
Metka Lobnik	Girls' 78 kg	Alaa Mousaad Mohamed (EGY); W 10s2-002	Raffaela Igl (GER); L 00s1-10	did not advance	Bye	Maral Mardani (IRI); W 10-00	Alaa Mousaad Mohamed (EGY); W 10-00s2	Ester Svobodová (CZE); W 10-00s1	3rd place, bronze medalist(s)

Team

Athletes	Event	Round of 16	Quarterfinals	Semifinals	Final	
Athletes	Event	Opposition Result	Opposition Result	Opposition Result	Opposition Result	Rank
Team Rio de Janeiro; Milana Charygulyyeva (TKM); Yassamine Djellab (ALG); Metka Lobnik (SLO); Erza Muminoviq (KOS); Abrek Naguchev (RUS); Fleury Nihozeko (BUR); Jamshed Sulaimoni (TJK); Sultan Zhenishbekov (KGZ)	Mixed team	Team Sydney (MIX); W 4–3	Team Atlanta (MIX); W 5–4	Team Athens (MIX); L 3–5	did not advance	3rd place, bronze medalist(s)
Team Atlanta; Tiguidanke Camara (GUI); Aleksa Georgieva (BUL); Vusala Karimova (AZE); Adrián Medero (PUR); Rok Pogorevc (SLO); Fatine Rzal (MAR); Adrian Sulca (ROU); Antonio Tornal (DOM)	Mixed team	Team Barcelona (MIX); W 4–3	Team Barcelona (MIX); L 3–4	did not advance		

== Rowing ==
Slovenia qualified one boat based on its performance at the 2018 European Rowing Junior Championships.

- Girls' single sculls - 1 boat

Athlete	Event	Time trial		Heats						Quarterfinals		Semifinals		Final	
Athlete	Event	Time trial		Round 1		Round 2		Points	Rank	Quarterfinals		Semifinals		Final	
Athlete	Event	Time	Rank	Time	Rank	Time	Rank	Points	Rank	Time	Rank	Time	Rank	Time	Rank
Ilaria Macchi	Girls' single sculls	3:59.80	6	1:57.68	1	1:54.41	2	10	7	1:50.82	4 F3	did not advance		1:49.85	3

== Sailing ==
Slovenia qualified one boat based on its performance at the African and European IKA Twin Tip Racing Qualifiers.

- Boys' IKA Twin Tip Racing - 1 boat

Boys

Athlete	Event	Race												Total Points	Net Points	Final Rank
Athlete	Event	1	2	3	4	5	6	7	8	9	10	11	12	Total Points	Net Points	Final Rank
Toni Vodišek	IKA Twin Tip Racing	3	(11)	(10)	4	1	2	CAN						31	10	2nd place, silver medalist(s)

== Shooting ==
Individual

Athlete	Event	Qualification		Final	
Athlete	Event	Points	Rank	Points	Rank
Anja Prezelj	Girls' 10m air pistol	560-8	8 Q	173.5	5

Team

Athletes	Event	Qualification		Round of 16	Quarterfinals	Semifinals	Final / BM	
Athletes	Event	Points	Rank	Opposition Result	Opposition Result	Opposition Result	Opposition Result	Rank
Anja Prezelj (SLO); Alp Eren Erdur (TUR)	Mixed 10m air pistol	733-9	18	did not advance				

== Sport climbing ==
Slovenia qualified two sport climbers based on its performance at the 2017 World Youth Sport Climbing Championships.

- Girls' combined - 2 quotas (Lučka Rakovec, Vita Lukan)

Athlete	Event	Qualification					Final				
Athlete	Event	Speed	Bouldering	Lead	Total	Rank	Speed	Bouldering	Lead	Total	Rank
Lučka Rakovec	Girls' combined	12	13	5	780	13	did not advance				
Vita Lukan	Girls' combined	17	3	2	102	2	6	1	3	18	2nd place, silver medalist(s)

== Swimming ==
Boys

Athlete	Event	Heats		Semifinals		Final	
Athlete	Event	Time	Rank	Time	Rank	Time	Rank
Matija Može	100 m breaststroke	1:04.96	26	did not advance			
Matija Može	200 m breaststroke	2:16.28	7	—N/a		2:16.58	6
Gal Kordež	50 metre butterfly	24.99	22	did not advance			
Gal Kordež	100 metre butterfly	55.32	26	did not advance			
Gal Kordež	200 metre butterfly	2:05.62	25	did not advance			

Girls

Athlete	Event	Heats		Semifinals		Final	
Athlete	Event	Time	Rank	Time	Rank	Time	Rank
Neža Klančar	50 m freestyle	25.65	2	25.47	4	25.47	3rd place, bronze medalist(s)
Neža Klančar	100 m freestyle	55.59	3	55.10	3	54.55	3rd place, bronze medalist(s)
Neža Klančar	200 m individual medley	2:15.94	5	—N/a		2:15.12	5
Tina Čelik	50 metre breaststroke	32.44	13	31.89	5	31.75	3rd place, bronze medalist(s)
Tina Čelik	100 metre breaststroke	1:10.91	12	1:10.77	14	did not advance	
Tina Čelik	200 metre breaststroke	2:34.54	20	did not advance			

== Table Tennis ==
Athlete	Event	Group stage		Round of 16	Quarterfinals	Semifinals	Final / BM	
Athlete	Event	Opposition Score	Rank	Opposition Score	Opposition Score	Opposition Score	Opposition Score	Rank
Aleksandra Vovk	Girls' singles	Marwa Alhodaby (EGY) W 4-2; Goi Rui Xuan (SGP) L 0-4; Archana Girish Kamath (IND) L 1-4	3	did not advance				
Europe–5; Aleksandra Vovk (SLO); Vladislav Ursu (MDA)	Mixed team	Youssef Abdel-Aziz (EGY) / Marwa Alhodaby (EGY) W 3–2; Javen Choong (MAS) / Alice Li Sian Chang (MAS) W 3–0; Guilherme Teodoro (BRA) / Bruna Takahashi (BRA) W 3–1	1	Truls Möregårdh (SWE) / Sabina Šurjan (SRB); L 1–3	did not advance			5

== Taekwondo ==
Athlete	Event	Quarterfinals	Semifinals	Final	
Athlete	Event	Opposition Result	Opposition Result	Opposition Result	Rank
Nik Auguštin	Boys' +73 kg	Mohammadali Khosravi (IRI); L 11-16	did not advance		

== Tennis ==
Singles

Athlete	Event	Round of 32	Round of 16	Quarterfinals	Semifinals	Final / BM	
Athlete	Event	Opposition Score	Opposition Score	Opposition Score	Opposition Score	Opposition Score	Rank
Kaja Juvan	Girls' singles	SȘ Cadar (ROU); W (6-2, 7–5)	V Dema (UKR); W (6-0, 6–0)	O Selekhmeteva (RUS); W (1-6, 7–5, 6–3)	Xin Wang (CHN); W (6-0, 7–5)	Clara Burel (FRA); W (7-5, 6–4)	1st place, gold medalist(s)

Doubles

Athletes	Event	Round of 32	Round of 16	Quarterfinals	Semifinals	Final / BM	
Athletes	Event	Opposition Score	Opposition Score	Opposition Score	Opposition Score	Opposition Score	Rank
K Juvan (SLO); I Świątek (POL)	Girls' doubles	—N/a	E Cocciaretto (ITA); S Zünd (LIE); W (6-0, 6–2)	C Burel (FRA); D Parry (FRA); W (6-0, 6–4)	ML Carlé (ARG); Osorio (COL); W (6-2, 6–2)	Y Naito (JPN); N Sato (JPN); W (6-7, 7–5, 10–4)	1st place, gold medalist(s)
Marko Miladinović (SRB); Kaja Juvan (SLO)	Mixed Doubles	Viktoryia Kanapatskaya (BLR); Arnaud Bovy (BEL); W 2–0; 6–4, 6–4	Sada Nahimana (BDI); Philip Henning (RSA); W 2–1; 6–2, 4–6, [10]–[8]	Clara Burel (FRA); Hugo Gaston (FRA); L 1–2; 2–6, 7–5, [9]–[11]	did not advance		5

== Triathlon ==
Slovenia qualified one athlete based on its performance at the 2018 European Youth Olympic Games Qualifier.

Individual

Athlete	Event	Swim (750m)	Trans 1	Bike (20 km)	Trans 2	Run (5 km)	Total Time	Rank
Jan Škrjanc	Boys	9:47	0:29	28:33	0:26	18:04	57:19	19

Relay

Athlete	Event	Total Times per Athlete (Swim 250m, Bike 6.6 km, Run 1.8 km)	Total Group Time	Rank
Europe 6 Ines Rico (POR); Jan Škrjanc (SLO); Libby Coleman (GBR); Rik Malcorps (BEL)	Mixed Relay	23:01 (10); 21:27 (7); 23:14 (4); 21:53 (6)	1:29:21	5
