= Sarah Tetzlaff =

New Zealand speed climber

Personal information
- Nickname: Capa
- Nationality: New Zealand
- Born: 18 April 2000 (age 26) Lower Hutt, New Zealand
- Home town: Tauranga, New Zealand
- Education: University of Waikato
- Years active: 2017–present
- Height: 173 cm (5 ft 8 in)

Sport
- Sport: Competition climbing
- Event: Speed climbing
- Club: Bay of Plenty Sport Climbing Association
- Coached by: Rob Moore

Sarah Tetzlaff (born 18 April 2000) is a competition climber from New Zealand, specialising in competition speed climbing, and a member of the 2024 New Zealand Olympic Team. She won her place at the Olympics by winning the Oceania qualifier, held in November 2023 in Melbourne, Australia.

== Early life ==
Tetzlaff was born in 2000 in Lower Hutt. She gave up gymnastics as an 11-year-old, in part because of the drive to push on through injuries. She tried circus performance but eventually settled on climbing, a shared interest with her younger brother. By age 13 she was competing in speed, but her fear of heights sometimes left her frozen at the top of the wall for many minutes. While finishing at Wellington Girls' College, at age 17, she went to Germany for an exchange month.

For years Tetzlaff had to train in other countries, as the nearest speed wall to New Zealand was thousands of km away in New Caledonia. In 2018 she moved from Wellington to Tauranga, where she uses a speed wall in Blake Park at Mount Maunganui.

== Competition climbing ==
Tetzlaff entered the 2017 Oceania Youth Championship in Nouméa, signed up for the qualification event for the 2018 Summer Youth Olympics "on a whim", and medalled in all three of speed, boulder, and lead, taking gold in speed and boulder. That result took her to the Youth Olympics in Buenos Aires, Argentina, where she took 21st place in sport climbing at the 2018 Summer Youth Olympics, a combined event featuring all three disciplines.

Even before the 2018 Youth Olympics, she stated: "my sights are set on the 2024 Paris Olympics". When she won the Oceania qualifier in 2023, she and teammate Julian David became the first two New Zealanders to gain a place in the 2024 Olympics, and they will be the first New Zealanders to compete in climbing at the Olympics. Her time in the final qualifying race, 8.54 seconds, was a personal best but well behind the times of the top contenders at the Olympics. Her goal is to continue improving her times to reach the world standard by 2028 and 2032.

In a World Cup in Chamonix prior to the 2024 Summer Olympics, she set another personal best and an Oceania record with a time of 8.40.

In the qualification seeding round of the Paris Olympics, Tetzlaff achieved a new personal best time of 8.39 seconds and received the 12th seed for the elimination rounds. She exited the competition later that same day, posting a 8.41–second run in a round where she was eliminated by Aleksandra Kałucka of Poland.

== Personal life ==
Tetzlaff is a part-time master's student in environmental science, at the University of Waikato, focusing on the shallow water near the shores of Lake Tarawera. Her master's research won the 2023 Waikato Regional Council Prize in Water Science.

== Major results ==
=== Olympic Games ===
Discipline	2024
Speed	12

=== World championships ===
Discipline	2019	2021	2023
Lead	92	—	—
Bouldering	68	—	—
Speed	76	—	44
Combined	70	—	—

=== World Cup ===
Discipline	2018	2019	2021	2022	2023	2024
Speed	103	—	—	76	63	39
Combined	—	61	—	—	—	—
