= Oceana Mackenzie =

Australian rock climber

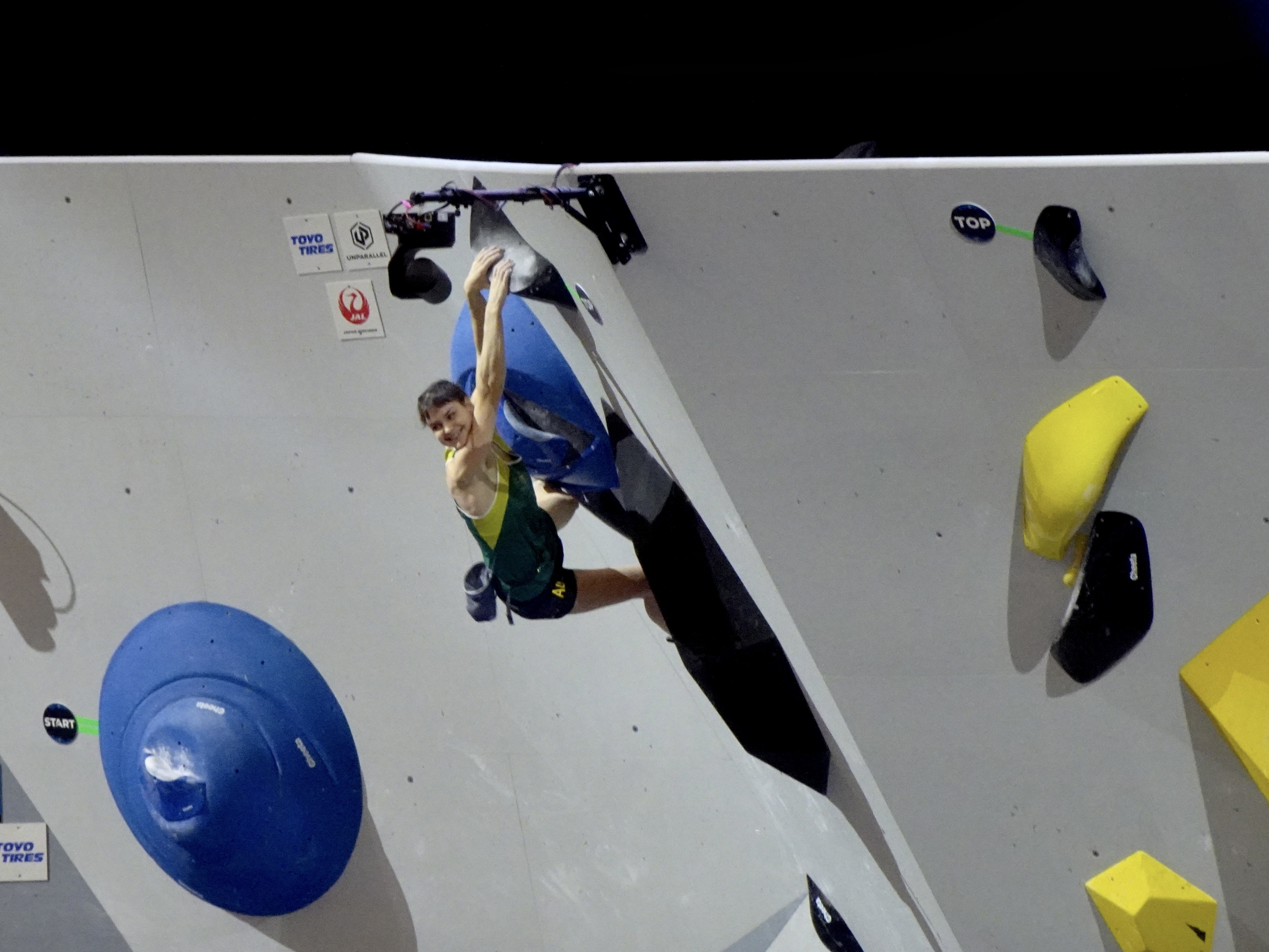
- Mackenzie in the boulder semi-finals at the 2023 Climbing World Championships

Personal information
- Nationality: Australian
- Born: 11 July 2002 (age 24) Heidelberg, Germany
- Height: 173 cm (5 ft 8 in)
- Website: https://www.oceanamackenzie.com

Climbing career
- Type of climber: Competition bouldering; Competition lead climbing
Medal record
Women's competition climbing
Representing Australia
World Cup (Season)
Silver medal – second place	2024	Bouldering
Silver medal – second place	2026	Bouldering
World Cup
Gold medal – first place	Bern 2026	Bouldering
Bronze medal – third place	Prague 2024	Bouldering
Bronze medal – third place	Keqiao 2026	Bouldering
Bronze medal – third place	Innsbruck 2026	Bouldering
- Updated on 20 August, 2026

Oceania "Oceana" Mackenzie (/ˌoʊʃiːˈɑːnə/ OH-shee-AH-nə; born 11 July 2002) is an Australian rock climber and competition climber who specializes in competition bouldering. She competed in the 2020 Summer Olympics, coming 19th, and in the 2024 Summer Olympics, coming 7th.

== Competition climbing career ==
Mackenzie started climbing when she was 8 years old. At the age of 15, she began to take part in the IFSC Climbing World Cup. She reached her first IFSC final of a bouldering World Cup in Meiringen in 2019, where she finished sixth.

At the 2020 Oceania Championships, she won the combined event and qualified for the 2020 Summer Olympics in Tokyo. At the Olympics, held in 2021, Mackenzie finished nineteenth in the qualification round and therefore did not compete in the finals.

Mackenzie again won the combined event at the Oceania Championships in 2023 to earn a place at the 2024 Summer Olympics, scoring 199.9 points in its final out of a possible 200. At the Olympics she made the final and placed seventh.

During the 2026 World Climbing Series, Mackenzie won her first World Climbing Series gold medal in Bern, with a score of 74.5 out of 100 in the bouldering competition.

== Personal life ==
Mackenzie was born in Heidelberg, Germany to New Zealander parents. She moved as a baby with her five elder sisters to Queensland, Australia before settling in Melbourne.

Although Oceania is on her birth certificate, her parents decided they preferred Oceana, without the "i". Both are commonly used. Her friends call her "Oce" (pronounced "oh-sh").

She follows a mostly vegan lifestyle, now describing herself as a “vEGGan” athlete. In her free time, she enjoys baking, reading and learning Japanese.

== See also ==
- Janja Garnbret
