= Yannick Flohé =

German rock climber

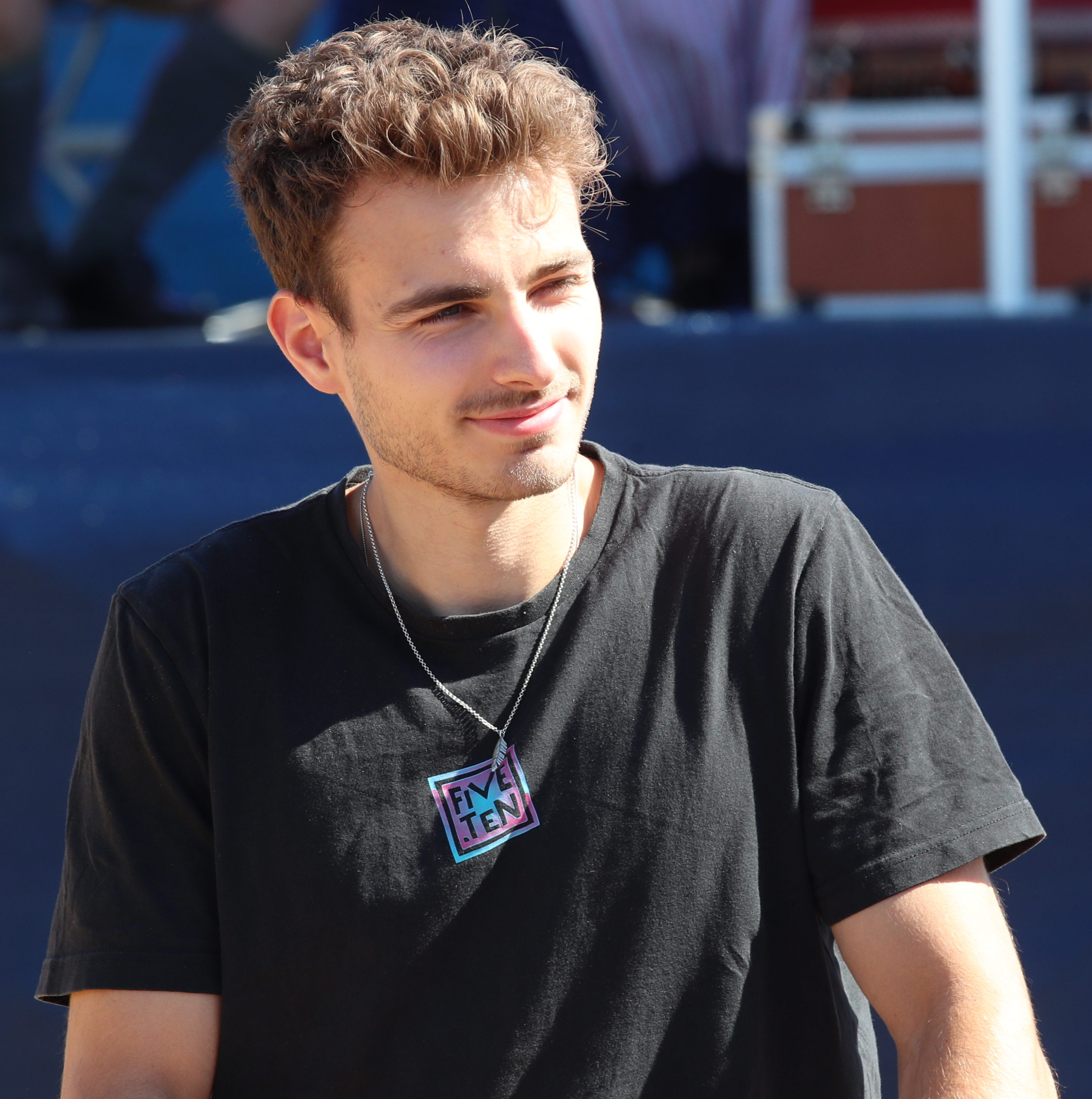
- Flohé in 2022

Personal information
- Born: 14 August 1999 (age 27)

Climbing career
- Type of climber: Competition climbing; Bouldering
- Highest grade: Redpoint: 9b+ (5.15c); Bouldering: V17 (9A)
- First ascents: Return of the Dreamtime (V16, 2023)
Medal record
Men's competition climbing
Representing Germany
World Championships
Gold medal – first place	2021 Moscow	Combined
Bronze medal – third place	2019 Hachiōji	Bouldering
World Cup
Gold medal – first place	Brixen 2022	Bouldering
Bronze medal – third place	Koper 2022	Lead

Yannick Flohé (born 14 August 1999) is a German professional rock climber who specializes in competition climbing. He participated at the 2019 and 2021 IFSC Climbing World Championships, being awarded the bronze and gold medal in the men's bouldering and men's combined events. Flohé is the first climber in history to flash a boulder problem graded 8C (V15), with his ascent of Foundation's Edge in July 2025.

== Notable ascents ==
=== Boulder problems ===
9A (V17):

- No One Mourns The Wicked - Thunder Ridge (Colorado)- 9 April 2026 - Fourth Ascent

8C+ (V16):

- The Story of Three Worlds - Cresciano (Switzerland) - 15 February 2025 - Third ascent.
- Return of the Dreamtime - Cresciano (Switzerland) - 31 January 2023 - First ascent.
- Ephyra - Chironico (Switzerland) - 24 January 2023 - Fifth ascent.
- Off the Wagon Low - Val Bavona (Switzerland) - 1 January 2022 - Seventh ascent.

8C (V15):

- Defying Gravity - Thunder Ridge (USA) - March 2026.
- Bügeleisen SDS - Maltatal (Austria) - February 2026.
- Foundation's Edge - Val de Bagnes (Switzerland) - 9 July 2025 - Sixteenth ascent. First ever flash at this grade.
- From Dirt Grows the Flowers - Chironico (Switzerland) - 24 January 2023 - Tenth ascent.
- Everything the Light Touches - Brione (Switzerland) - 22 March 2022 - Second ascent.
- Forgotten Gem - Chironico (Switzerland) - 19 March 2022 - Third ascent.
- Dreamtime - Cresciano (Switzerland) - 15 December 2020 - Tenth ascent.

=== Redpointed routes ===
5.15c (9b+)

- Excalibur - Arco (Italy) - December 2025 - Fourth ascent.

5.15b (9b)

- Ratstaman Vibrations - Céüse (France) - 27 August 2025 - Second ascent. First ascent by Alexander Megos. Graded 9b/+ by Flohé.

5.15a (9a+)

- Corona - Frankenjura (Germany) - 5 October 2025 - Eighth ascent.

- Lazarus - Frankenjura (Germany) - 18 April 2024 - Third ascent.
