= Val Bavona =

Coordinates: 46°22′26″N 8°32′53″E

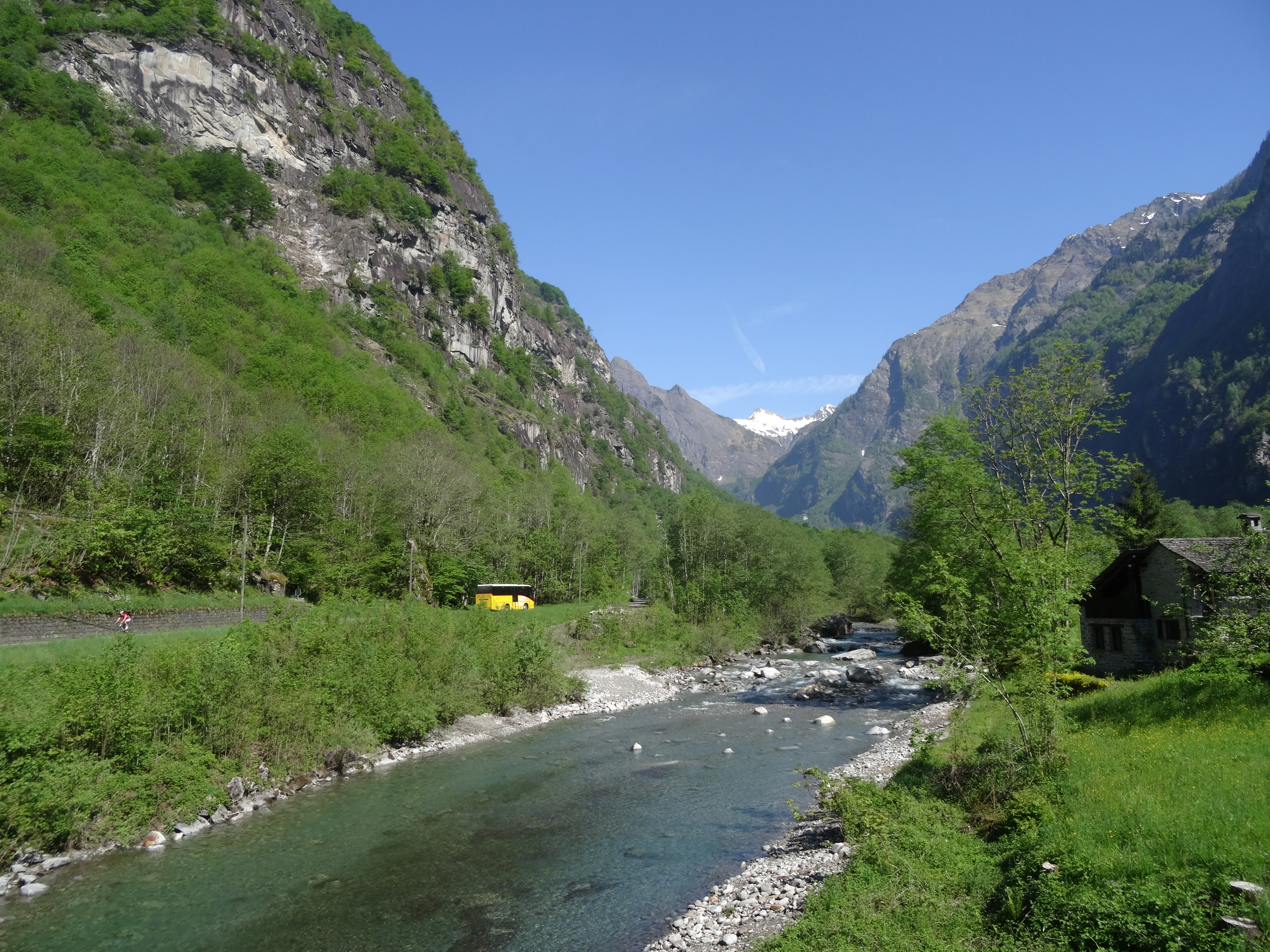
The Val Bavona near Roseto

The Val Bavona is a ten-kilometer-long trough valley in the northwestern part of Ticino, Switzerland, in the Vallemaggia District.

== History, economy and culture ==
First human settlements have appeared about 1000 A.D., with a constant number of people living in Val Bavona until about 1600. Repeated natural disasters caused by deforestation have then forced the population back to the lower villages of Cavergno and Bignasco, so that the numerous hamlets of Val Bavona were only used as summer abodes for farmers and livestock keepers.

The prevalent economy of this valley was livestock (goats and cattle), as well as rye farming and logging.

During the construction of hydro power plants, the valley received its first and only made-up road in 1957. Before that, people had to use the mule tracks between the settlements.

In 1983, the valley received federal protection status. The late construction of the road, and the fact that the valley is still not attached to the electricity grid, has preserved the historical look of Val Bavona's settlements.

Today, the Val Bavona is mostly known for hiking, bouldering, a few restaurants, and its holiday apartments that offer basic comfort.

== Settlements in Val Bavona ==
From Cavergno northwards:

- Mondada (565 m)
- Fontana (599 m)
- Sabbione (646 m)
- Ritorto
- Foroglio (697 m)
- Roseto (756 m)
- Fontanelada
- Faèd
- Sonlerto (807 m)
- San Carlo (957 m)

== Notable buildings ==
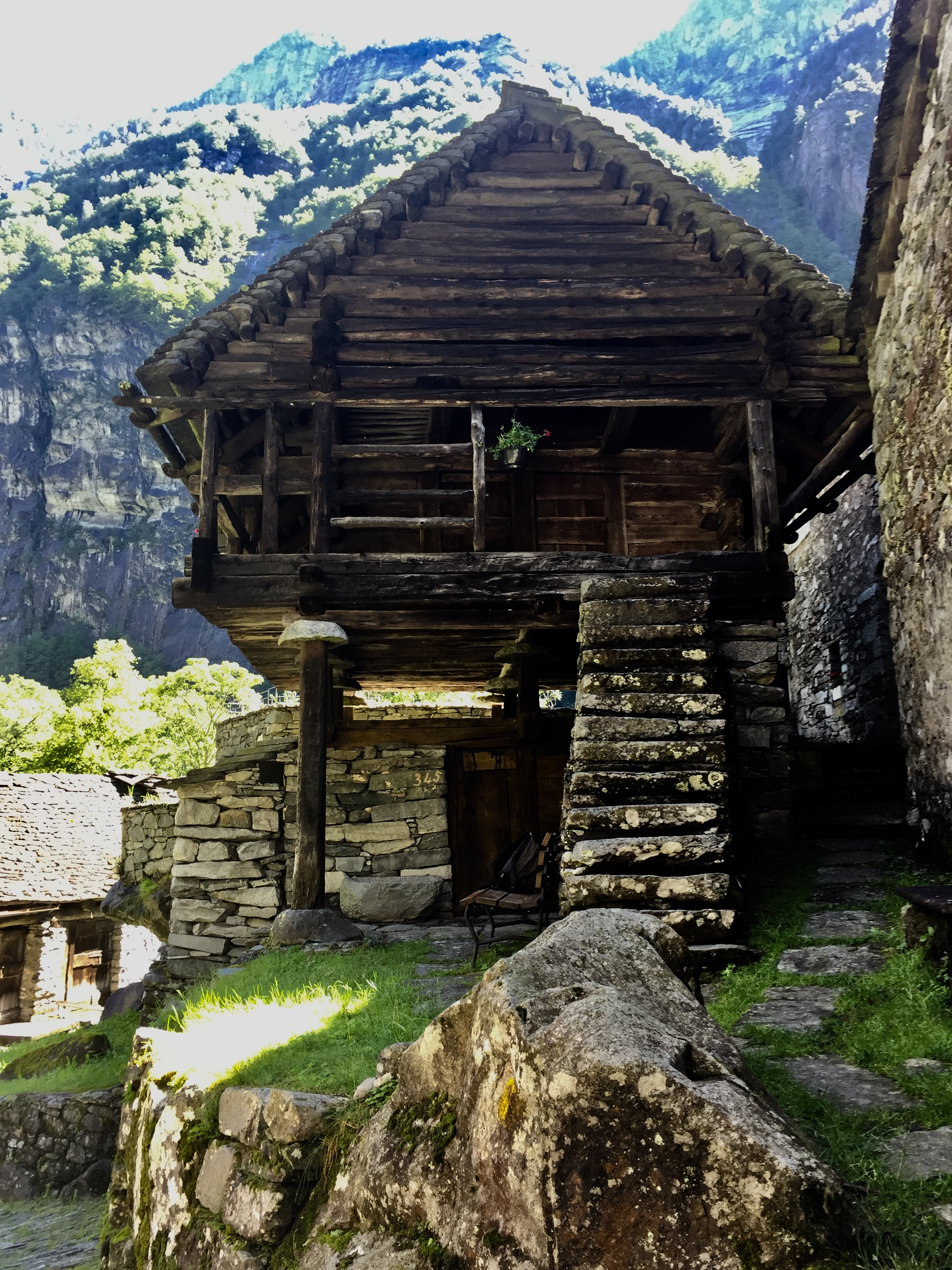
A torba (rye granary) in Sonlerto. Though it was constructed in 1591, dendrochronology showed that some of the wood used in the building is from 1497.

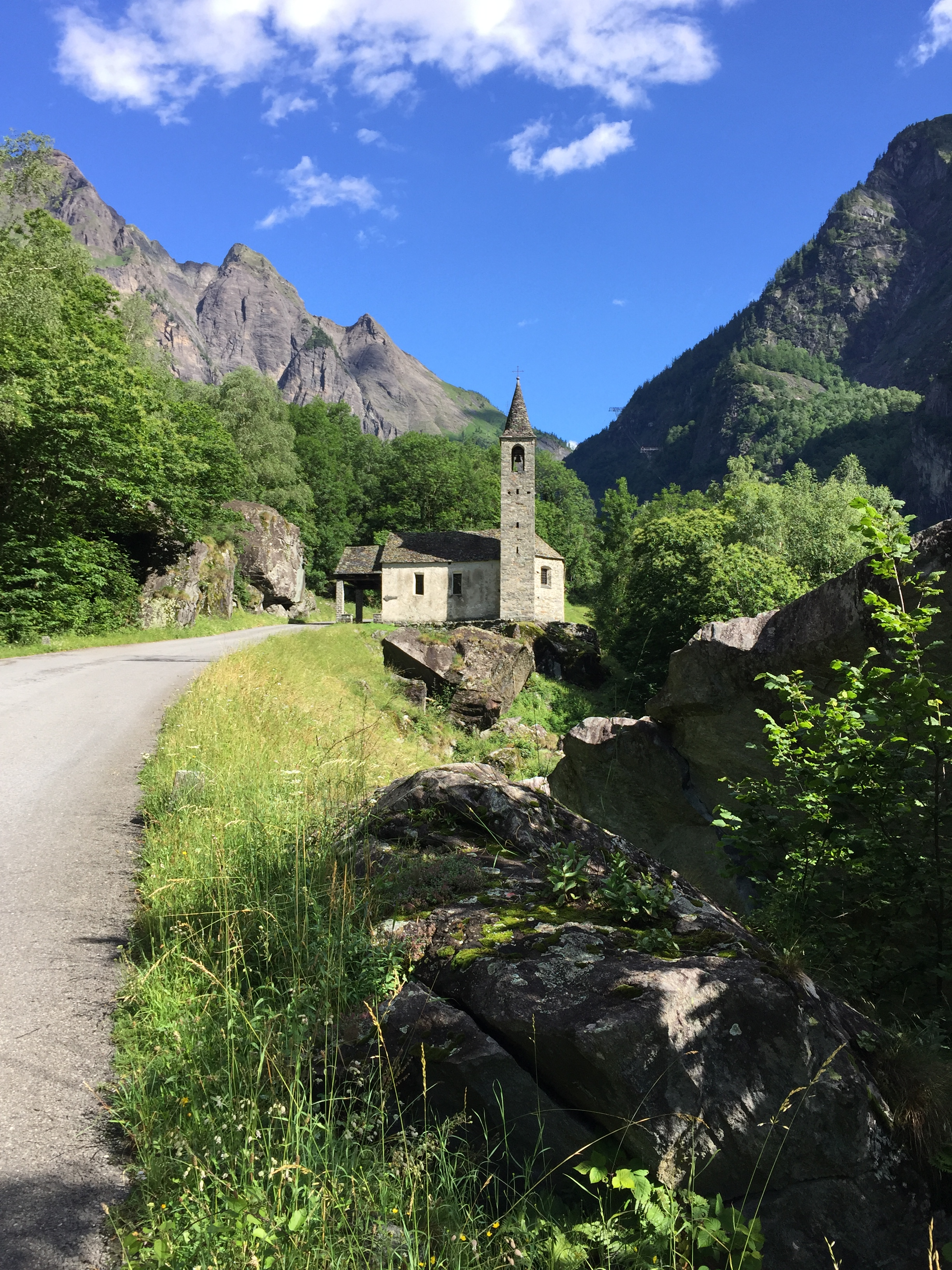
Church of Gannariente, built in 1595.

Aerial image of the upper valley, May 1954.
