= Hannah Meul =

German rock climber

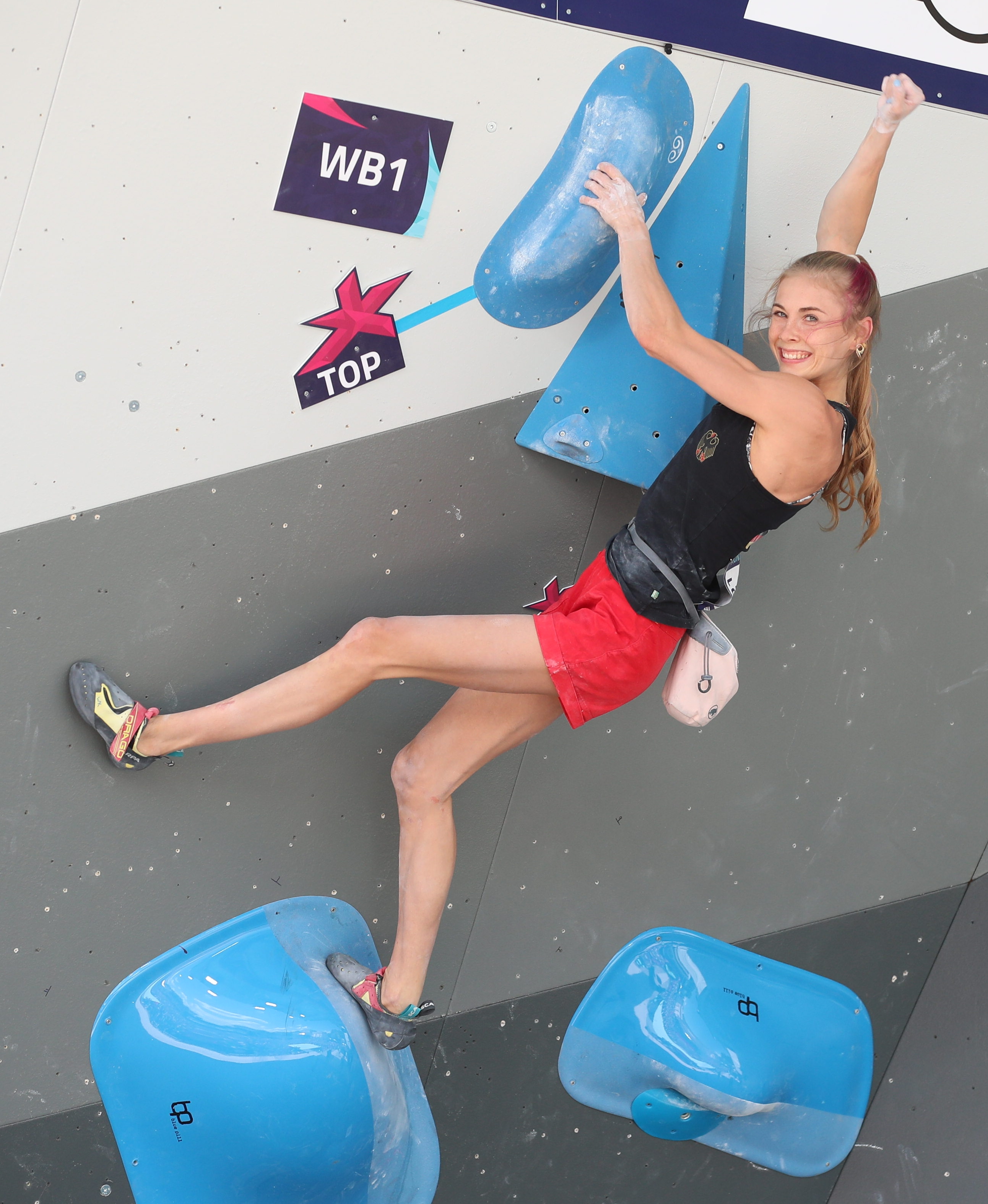
- Meul at the 2022 European Championships

Personal information
- Nationality: German
- Born: April 3, 2001 (age 25) Frechen
- Education: Cologne University of Applied Sciences (2020–)
- Occupation: Student
- Height: 167 cm (5 ft 6 in)
- Weight: 50 kg (110 lb)

Climbing career
- Type of climber: Competition bouldering; Bouldering
- Highest grade: Bouldering: 8A+ (V12)
Medal record
Women's competition climbing
Representing Germany
Event / 1st / 2nd / 3rd; World Cup / 0 / 3 / 0
European Championships
| Silver medal – second place | 2022 Munich | Bouldering |
- Updated on 2023-04-26

Hannah Meul (born April 3, 2001, in Frechen) is a German rock climber who specialises in competition bouldering and bouldering. She won the silver medal in bouldering at the 2022 IFSC Climbing European Championships and has placed second three times on the IFSC Climbing World Cup circuit.

== Career ==
Meul began climbing at age seven and entered her first competition at age 10. In the 2015 season, she made her international debut, taking part in the European Youth Cup, European Youth Championships and IFSC Climbing World Youth Championships. At her first IFSC Climbing World Cup at Meiringen in 2017, she advanced to the semifinal and placed 12th. She was also the German lead champion that year.

She placed fourth in lead at the 2020 European Championships in Moscow, and placed fifth in combined at the 2021 IFSC Climbing World Championships, also in Moscow.

During the 2022 season, Meul qualified for her first World Cup final, topping all the final boulders in Brixen and finishing second to Natalia Grossman on attempts. She repeated her second-place finish at the Innsbruck Bouldering World Cup, again finishing behind Grossman. Meul then won the bouldering silver medal at the 2022 IFSC Climbing European Championships in Munich. She also made her first lead World Cup final in 2022, finishing fourth in Jakarta.

Meul began the 2023 season with a silver medal at the Bouldering World Cup in Hachioji, finishing behind Brooke Raboutou. On the podium, she paid tribute to her Germany teammate Christoph Schweiger, who had recently been killed in a traffic incident, by displaying his IFSC competitor badge.

== Personal ==
In 2020, she enrolled at the Cologne University of Applied Sciences. She has climbed boulders outdoors at Fontainebleau.

== Achievements ==
=== IFSC Climbing World Championships ===
| Discipline | 2021 Moscow |
|---|---|
| Lead | 22 |
| Bouldering | 23 |
| Speed | 33 |
| Combined | 5 |

=== IFSC Climbing World Cup ===
==== Season rankings ====
| Discipline | 2017 | 2018 | 2019 | 2021 | 2022 |
|---|---|---|---|---|---|
| Lead | - | - | - | 29 | 14 |
| Bouldering | 36 | 42 | 37 | 25 | 5 |

==== Podiums ====
===== Bouldering =====
| Season | First | Second | Third | Total |
|---|---|---|---|---|
| 2022 | 0 | 2 | 0 | 2 |
| 2023 | 0 | 1 | 0 | 1 |
| Total | 0 | 3 | 0 | 3 |

=== IFSC European Climbing Championships ===
| Discipline | Moscow 2020 | Munich 2022 |
|---|---|---|
| Lead | 4 | 7 |
| Bouldering | 13 | 2 |
| Speed | 18 | - |
| Combined | 7 | 4 |

=== Junior Olympics ===
- Buenos Aires 2018: 4th place (Combined)

== Notable ascents ==
=== Bouldering ===
- Partage (8A+ (V12)) – Fontainebleau, 2021
- Duel (8A (V11)) – Fontainebleau, 2021
- Tigre et Dragon (8A (V11)) – Fontainebleau, 2021
- Golden assis (8A (V11)) – Fontainebleau, 2021
- Foxy Lady (8A (V11)) – Magic Wood, 2021
