= 2016 IFSC Climbing World Cup =

International sport climbing competition

- Location: Meiringen, Switzerland Kazo, Japan; Chongqing, China; Nanjing, China; Navi Mumbai, India; Innsbruck, Austria; Vail, United States; Chamonix, France; Villars, Switzerland; Briançon, France; Munich, Germany; Imst, Austria; Arco, Italy; Wujiang, China; Xiamen, China Kranj, Slovenia
- Date: 15 April – 27 November 2016

Champions
- Men: (B) (Japan) Tomoa Narasaki (L) (Slovenia) Domen Škofic (S) (Poland) Marcin Dzieński (C) (Canada) Sean McColl
- Women: (B) (United Kingdom) Shauna Coxsey (L) (Slovenia) Janja Garnbret (S) (Russia) Iuliia Kaplina (C) (Slovenia) Janja Garnbret

The 2016 IFSC Climbing World Cup was held in 16 locations. Bouldering, lead and speed competitions were held in 7 locations. The season began on 15 April in Meiringen, Switzerland and concluded on 27 November in Kranj, Slovenia.

The top 3 in each competition received medals, and the overall winners were awarded trophies. At the end of the season an overall ranking was determined based upon points, which athletes were awarded for finishing in the top 30 of each individual event.

The winners for bouldering were Tomoa Narasaki and Shauna Coxsey, for lead Domen Škofic and Janja Garnbret, and for speed Marcin Dzieński and Iuliia Kaplina, men and women respectively.

== Highlights of the season ==
In lead climbing, Slovenian athletes, Domen Škofic and Janja Garnbret clinched the overall titles of the season for men and women respectively, making it double lead titles for Slovenia.

France was the only nation in the top three National Team Ranking in all disciplines, ranked second in all.

== Overview ==
No.	Location	D	G	Gold	Silver	Bronze
1	(Switzerland) Meiringen (15–16 April 2016)	B	M	(Russia) Alexey Rubtsov	(Czech Republic) Martin Stráník	(Netherlands) Jorg Verhoeven
1	(Switzerland) Meiringen (15–16 April 2016)	B	W	(United Kingdom) Shauna Coxsey	(France) Mélissa Le Nevé	(United States) Megan Mascarenas
2	(Japan) Kazo (23–24 April 2016)	B	M	(Russia) Rustam Gelmanov	(Italy) Michael Piccolruaz	(Japan) Kokoro Fujii
2	(Japan) Kazo (23–24 April 2016)	B	W	(United Kingdom) Shauna Coxsey	(France) Mélissa Le Nevé	(Japan) Miho Nonaka
3	(China) Chongqing (30 April – 1 May 2016)	B	M	(Japan) Tomoa Narasaki	(Germany) Jan Hojer	(South Korea) Jongwon Chon
3	(China) Chongqing (30 April – 1 May 2016)	B	W	(United Kingdom) Shauna Coxsey	(Japan) Akiyo Noguchi	(Japan) Miho Nonaka
3	(China) Chongqing (30 April – 1 May 2016)	S	M	(Russia) Dmitrii Timofeev	(Czech Republic) Libor Hroza	(Ukraine) Danyil Boldyrev
3	(China) Chongqing (30 April – 1 May 2016)	S	W	(Russia) Iuliia Kaplina	(Poland) Klaudia Buczek	(Poland) Aleksandra Rudzinska
4	(China) Nanjing (7–8 May 2016)	S	M	(Iran) Reza Alipour	(Czech Republic) Libor Hroza	(Poland) Marcin Dzieński
4	(China) Nanjing (7–8 May 2016)	S	W	(Russia) Iuliia Kaplina	(Ukraine) Alla Marenych	(Russia) Anna Tsyganova
5	(India) Navi Mumbai (14–15 May 2016)	B	M	(Japan) Kokoro Fujii	(Japan) Tomoa Narasaki	(Russia) Alexey Rubtsov
5	(India) Navi Mumbai (14–15 May 2016)	B	W	(Japan) Miho Nonaka	(Germany) Monika Retschy	(Japan) Akiyo Noguchi
6	(Austria) Innsbruck (20–21 May 2016)	B	M	(South Korea) Jongwon Chon	(Japan) Tomoa Narasaki	(Canada) Sean McColl
6	(Austria) Innsbruck (20–21 May 2016)	B	W	(United Kingdom) Shauna Coxsey	(Slovenia) Janja Garnbret	(Japan) Miho Nonaka
7	(United States) Vail (10–11 June 2016)	B	M	(Japan) Kokoro Fujii	(Japan) Tomoa Narasaki	(Russia) Alexey Rubtsov
7	(United States) Vail (10–11 June 2016)	B	W	(United States) Megan Mascarenas	(United Kingdom) Shauna Coxsey	(Austria) Anna Stöhr
8	(France) Chamonix (11–12 July 2016)	L	M	(Slovenia) Domen Škofic	(Italy) Stefano Ghisolfi	(Austria) Jakob Schubert
8	(France) Chamonix (11–12 July 2016)	L	W	(Slovenia) Janja Garnbret	(Belgium) Anak Verhoeven	(South Korea) Jain Kim
8	(France) Chamonix (11–12 July 2016)	S	M	(Poland) Marcin Dzieński	(Czech Republic) Libor Hroza	(Iran) Reza Alipour
8	(France) Chamonix (11–12 July 2016)	S	W	(France) Anouck Jaubert	(Poland) Aleksandra Rudzinska	(Russia) Anna Tsyganova
9	(Switzerland) Villars (15–16 July 2016)	L	M	(Canada) Sean McColl	(Japan) Keiichiro Korenaga	(France) Thomas Joannes
9	(Switzerland) Villars (15–16 July 2016)	L	W	(Slovenia) Janja Garnbret	(Belgium) Anak Verhoeven	(South Korea) Jain Kim
9	(Switzerland) Villars (15–16 July 2016)	S	M	(Poland) Marcin Dzieński	(Ukraine) Danyil Boldyrev	(Russia) Stanislav Kokorin
9	(Switzerland) Villars (15–16 July 2016)	S	W	(France) Anouck Jaubert	(Russia) Iuliia Kaplina	(France) Elma Fleuret
10	(France) Briançon (22–23 July 2016)	L	M	(Slovenia) Domen Škofic	(France) Romain Desgranges	(Canada) Sean McColl
10	(France) Briançon (22–23 July 2016)	L	W	(Slovenia) Janja Garnbret	(Austria) Jessica Pilz	(Austria) Magdalena Röck
11	(Germany) Munich (12–13 August 2016)	B	M	(Japan) Tomoa Narasaki	(South Korea) Jongwon Chon	(Russia) Alexey Rubtsov
11	(Germany) Munich (12–13 August 2016)	B	W	(Japan) Miho Nonaka	(United Kingdom) Shauna Coxsey	(Japan) Akiyo Noguchi
12	(Austria) Imst (19–20 August 2016)	L	M	(Slovenia) Domen Škofic	(Austria) Jakob Schubert	(France) Gautier Supper
12	(Austria) Imst (19–20 August 2016)	L	W	(Austria) Magdalena Röck	(Slovenia) Mina Markovič	(South Korea) Jain Kim
13	(Italy) Arco (26–27 August 2016)	L	M	(France) Romain Desgranges	(Austria) Jakob Schubert	(Russia) Dmitrii Fakirianov
13	(Italy) Arco (26–27 August 2016)	L	W	(Belgium) Anak Verhoeven	(South Korea) Jain Kim	(Slovenia) Janja Garnbret
13	(Italy) Arco (26–27 August 2016)	S	M	(Poland) Marcin Dzieński	(Ukraine) Danyil Boldyrev	(France) Bassa Mawem
13	(Italy) Arco (26–27 August 2016)	S	W	(France) Anouck Jaubert	(Russia) Iuliia Kaplina	(Poland) Klaudia Buczek
14	(China) Wujiang (18–19 October 2016)	S	M	(China) QiXin Zhong	(Russia) Vladislav Deulin	(Poland) Marcin Dzieński
14	(China) Wujiang (18–19 October 2016)	S	W	(France) Anouck Jaubert	(Russia) Iuliia Kaplina	(Poland) Aleksandra Rudzinska
15	(China) Xiamen (22–23 October 2016)	L	M	(Italy) Stefano Ghisolfi	(Russia) Dmitrii Fakirianov	(Austria) Jakob Schubert
15	(China) Xiamen (22–23 October 2016)	L	W	(Slovenia) Janja Garnbret	(Belgium) Anak Verhoeven	(South Korea) Jain Kim
15	(China) Xiamen (22–23 October 2016)	S	M	(Russia) Stanislav Kokorin	(France) Bassa Mawem	(China) QiXin Zhong
15	(China) Xiamen (22–23 October 2016)	S	W	(Poland) Klaudia Buczek	(Russia) Iuliia Kaplina	(Russia) Anna Tsyganova
16	(Slovenia) Kranj (26–27 November 2016)	L	M	(Germany) Sebastian Halenke	(Slovenia) Domen Škofic	(Austria) Jakob Schubert
16	(Slovenia) Kranj (26–27 November 2016)	L	W	(Belgium) Anak Verhoeven	(Japan) Akiyo Noguchi	(Slovenia) Janja Garnbret
OVERALL		B	M	(Japan) Tomoa Narasaki	(Japan) Kokoro Fujii	(Russia) Alexey Rubtsov
OVERALL		B	W	(United Kingdom) Shauna Coxsey	(Japan) Miho Nonaka	(France) Mélissa Le Nevé
OVERALL		L	M	(Slovenia) Domen Škofic	(Austria) Jakob Schubert	(France) Romain Desgranges
OVERALL		L	W	(Slovenia) Janja Garnbret	(Belgium) Anak Verhoeven	(South Korea) Jain Kim
OVERALL		S	M	(Poland) Marcin Dzieński	(Russia) Stanislav Kokorin	(Ukraine) Danyil Boldyrev
OVERALL		S	W	(Russia) Iuliia Kaplina	(France) Anouck Jaubert	(Poland) Klaudia Buczek
OVERALL		C	M	(Canada) Sean McColl	(Austria) Jakob Schubert	(Japan) Kokoro Fujii
OVERALL		C	W	(Slovenia) Janja Garnbret	(Japan) Akiyo Noguchi	(Austria) Jessica Pilz
NATIONAL TEAMS		B	A	(Japan)	France	(United Kingdom) Great Britain
NATIONAL TEAMS		L	A	Slovenia	France	Austria
NATIONAL TEAMS		S	A	(Russia) Russian Federation	France	Poland

== Bouldering ==
An overall ranking was determined based upon points, which athletes were awarded for finishing in the top 30 of each individual event.

=== Men ===
6 best competition results were counted (not counting points in brackets) for IFSC Climbing World Cup 2016.

Rank	Name	Points	Munich	Vail	Innsbruck	Navi Mumbai	Chongqing	Kazo	Meiringen
1	(Japan) Tomoa Narasaki	462.00	1. 100.00	2. 80.00	2. 80.00	2. 80.00	1. 100.00	15. 22.00	18. (16.00)
2	(Japan) Kokoro Fujii	395.00	8. 40.00	1. 100.00	10. (34.00)	1. 100.00	4. 55.00	3. 65.00	9. 35.00
3	(Russia) Alexey Rubtsov	372.00	3. 65.00	3. 65.00	16. (20.00)	3. 65.00	5. 51.00	13. 26.00	1. 100.00
4	(South Korea) Chon Jong-won	344.00	2. 80.00	13. 26.00	1. 100.00	4. 55.00	3. 65.00	-	17. 18.00
5	(Russia) Rustam Gelmanov	270.00	-	5. 51.00	27. 3.00	5. 51.00	9. 37.00	1. 100.00	12. 28.00
6	(Canada) Sean McColl	244.00	-	6. 47.00	3. 65.00	10. 34.00	7. 43.00	7. 43.00	20. 12.00
7	(Czech Republic) Martin Stráník	214.00	17. 18.00	7. 43.00	6. 47.00	19. 14.00	-	20. 12.00	2. 80.00
8	(France) Jeremy Bonder	205.00	7. 43.00	-	-	6. 47.00	10. 34.00	4. 55.00	13. 26.00
9	(Germany) Jan Hojer	177.00	-	21. 9.00	-	18. 16.00	2. 80.00	9. 37.00	9. 35.00
10	(Slovenia) Jernej Kruder	169.00	28. (3.00)	11. 31.00	14. 24.00	15. 22.00	12. 28.00	8. 40.00	14. 24.00

=== Women ===
6 best competition results were counted (not counting points in brackets) for IFSC Climbing World Cup 2016.

Rank	Name	Points	Munich	Vail	Innsbruck	Navi Mumbai	Chongqing	Kazo	Meiringen
1	(United Kingdom) Shauna Coxsey	560.00	2. 80.00	2. 80.00	1. 100.00	9. (37.00)	1. 100.00	1. 100.00	1. 100.00
2	(Japan) Miho Nonaka	446.00	1. 100.00	5. 51.00	3. 65.00	1. 100.00	3. 65.00	3. 65.00	14. (24.00)
3	(France) Mélissa Le Nevé	368.00	4. 55.00	4. 55.00	8. (40.00)	4. 55.00	7. 43.00	2. 80.00	2. 80.00
4	(Japan) Akiyo Noguchi	352.00	3. 65.00	8. 40.00	6. 47.00	3. 65.00	2. 80.00	20. (12.00)	4. 55.00
5	(Germany) Monika Retschy	236.00	24. 7.00	10. 34.00	12. 28.00	2. 80.00	6. 47.00	8. 40.00	25. (5.00)
6	(France) Fanny Gibert	223.00	7. 43.00	-	21. 9.00	8. 40.00	9. 37.00	5. 51.00	7. 43.00
7	(United States) Megan Mascarenas	220.00	-	1. 100.00	4. 55.00	-	-	-	3. 65.00
8	(Switzerland) Petra Klingler	192.00	21. 9.00	7. 43.00	13. 25.00	-	13. 26.00	4. 55.00	10. 34.00
9	(France) Clementine Kaiser	175.00	13. 26.00	-	-	7. 43.00	11. 31.00	12. 28.00	6. 47.00
10	(South Korea) Sa Sol	171.00	-	18. 16.00	7. 43.00	5. 51.00	16. 20.00	18. 15.00	13. 26.00

=== National Teams ===
For National Team Ranking, 3 best results per competition and category were counted (not counting results in brackets).

Country names as used by the IFSC

Rank	Nation	Points	Munich	Vail	Innsbruck	Navi Mumbai	Chongqing	Kazo	Meiringen
1	(Japan)	1964	359	334	238	412	381	240	(172)
2	France	1347	276	(81)	174	185	176	244	292
3	(United Kingdom) Great Britain	1087	129	161	185	(68)	174	202	236
4	(Russia) Russian Federation	779	123	116	(86)	116	119	177	128
5	Austria	682	100	137	125	119	89	(87)	112
6	Germany	588	117	66	(37)	120	127	111	47
7	(South Korea) Republic of Korea	500	80	42	143	106	85	(15)	44
8	United States	411	(0)	210	63	19	28	9	82
9	Canada	402	(1)	75	91	84	53	69	30
10	Slovenia	377	70	33	120	30	(28)	40	84

== Lead ==
An overall ranking was determined based upon points, which athletes were awarded for finishing in the top 30 of each individual event.

=== Men ===
6 best competition results were counted (not counting results in parentheses) for IFSC Climbing Worldcup 2016.

Rank	Name	Points	Kranj	Xiamen	Arco	Imst	Briançon	Villars	Chamonix
1	(Slovenia) Domen Škofic	472.00	2. 80.00	9. 37.00	4. 55.00	1. 100.00	1. 100.00	13. (25.00)	1. 100.00
2	(Austria) Jakob Schubert	402.00	3. 65.00	3. 65.00	2. 80.00	2. 80.00	8. (40.00)	6. 47.00	3. 65.00
3	(France) Romain Desgranges	380.00	7. 43.00	5. 51.00	1. 100.00	4. 55.00	2. 80.00	27. (4.00)	5. 51.00
4	(Italy) Stefano Ghisolfi	356.00	4. 55.00	1. 100.00	9. 37.00	6. 47.00	9. 37.00	9. (37.00)	2. 80.00
5	(France) Gautier Supper	281.00	13. 26.00	4. 55.00	22. (9.00)	3. 65.00	4. 55.00	13. 25.00	4. 55.00
6	(Canada) Sean McColl	279.00	9. 37.00	10. 34.00	-	-	3. 65.00	1. 100.00	7. 43.00
7	(Germany) Sebastian Halenke	255.00	1. 100.00	-	6. 47.00	5. 51.00	26. 5.00	26. 5.00	6. 47.00
8	(France) Thomas Joannes	232.00	10. 34.00	6. 47.00	11. 31.00	11. 31.00	15. (22.00)	3. 65.00	14. 24.00
9	(Japan) Masahiro Higuchi	213.00	14. 24.00	7. 43.00	-	13. 26.00	5. 51.00	7. 43.00	13. 26.00
10	(Slovenia) Urban Primozic	199.00	6. 47.00	-	12. 28.00	17. 18.00	7. 43.00	5. 51.00	20. 12.00

=== Women ===
6 best competition results were counted (not counting results in parentheses) for IFSC Climbing Worldcup 2016.

Rank	Name	Points	Kranj	Xiamen	Arco	Imst	Briançon	Villars	Chamonix
1	(Slovenia) Janja Garnbret	530.00	3. 65.00	1. 100.00	3. 65.00	5. (51.00)	1. 100.00	1. 100.00	1. 100.00
2	(Belgium) Anak Verhoeven	495.00	1. 100.00	2. 80.00	1. 100.00	4. 55.00	8. (40.00)	2. 80.00	2. 80.00
3	(South Korea) Jain Kim	395.00	6. (47.00)	3. 65.00	2. 80.00	3. 65.00	4. 55.00	3. 65.00	3. 65.00
4	(Austria) Magdalena Röck	345.00	-	9. 37.00	9. 37.00	1. 100.00	3. 65.00	5. 51.00	4. 55.00
5	(Slovenia) Mina Markovič	306.00	4. 55.00	5. 51.00	5. 51.00	2. 80.00	-	15. 22.00	6. 47.00
6	(Japan) Yuka Kobayashi	239.00	7. 43.00	11. 31.00	7. 43.00	12. 28.00	23. (8.00)	7. 43.00	5. 51.00
7	(France) Mathilde Becerra	236.00	8. 40.00	10. 34.00	4. 55.00	17. (18.00)	6. 47.00	13. 26.00	10. 34.00
8	(France) Julia Chanourdie	230.00	9. 37.00	6. 47.00	8. 40.00	6. 47.00	13. (26.00)	12. 28.00	11. 31.00
9	(Austria) Jessica Pilz	223.00	13. 26.00	8. 40.00	-	-	2. 80.00	4. 55.00	15. 22.00
10	(France) Hélène Janicot	197.00	29. (1.00)	13. 26.00	12. 28.00	11. 31.00	5. 51.00	9. 37.00	14. 24.00

=== National Teams ===
For National Team Ranking, 3 best results per competition and category were counted (not counting results in parentheses).

Rank	Nation	Points	Kranj	Xiamen	Arco	Imst	Briançon	Villars	Chamonix
1	Slovenia	1575	298	(188)	224	292	268	216	277
2	France	1548	(190)	277	263	263	281	229	235
3	Austria	1325	220	(182)	221	256	234	200	194
4	(Japan)	1093	226	197	(105)	120	138	253	159
5	Italy	701	104	158	126	89	82	(77)	142
6	(South Korea) Republic of Korea	650	(47)	105	113	105	102	107	118
7	Belgium	599	100	111	100	90	(44)	104	94
8	(Switzerland) Suisse	385	34	-	71	74	89	54	63
9	(Russia) Russian Federation	383	51	89	111	53	56	(12)	23
10	(Germany)	313	100	-	62	66	24	12	49

== Speed ==
An overall ranking was determined based upon points, which athletes were awarded for finishing in the top 30 of each individual event.

=== Men ===
6 best competition results were counted (not counting points in brackets).

Rank	Name	Points	Xiamen	Wujiang	Arco	Villars	Chamonix	Nanjing	Chongqing
1	(Poland) Marcin Dzieński	485.00	13. (26.00)	3. 65.00	1. 100.00	1. 100.00	1. 100.00	3. 65.00	4. 55.00
2	(Russia) Stanislav Kokorin	366.00	1. 100.00	5. 51.00	10. (34.00)	3. 65.00	4. 55.00	4. 55.00	8. 40.00
3	(Ukraine) Danyil Boldyrev	363.00	5. 51.00	8. 40.00	2. 80.00	2. 80.00	18. (16.00)	6. 47.00	3. 65.00
4	(France) Bassa Mawem	349.00	2. 80.00	4. 55.00	3. 65.00	5. 51.00	15. (22.00)	5. 51.00	6. 47.00
5	(Iran) Reza Alipour	335.00	8. 40.00	6. 47.00	-	8. 40.00	3. 65.00	1. 100.00	7. 43.00
6	(Czech Republic) Libor Hroza	322.00	-	-	5. 51.00	11. 31.00	2. 80.00	2. 80.00	2. 80.00
7	(Russia) Dmitrii Timofeev	241.00	-	-	-	4. 55.00	7. 43.00	7. 43.00	1. 100.00
8	(Italy) Leonardo Gontero	214.00	9. 37.00	10. 34.00	4. 55.00	13. 26.00	12. 28.00	10. 34.00	13. (26.00)
9	(France) Quentin Nambot	194.00	7. 43.00	11. 31.00	7. 43.00	9. 37.00	8. 40.00	-	-
10	(Russia) Vladislav Deulin	187.00	4. 55.00	2. 80.00	-	12. 28.00	14. 24.00	-	-
10	(France) Guillaume Moro	187.00	6. 47.00	7. 43.00	8. 40.00	6. 47.00	21. 10.00	-	-

=== Women ===
6 best competition results were counted (not counting points in brackets).

Rank	Name	Points	Xiamen	Wujiang	Arco	Villars	Chamonix	Nanjing	Chongqing
1	(Russia) Iuliia Kaplina	520.00	2. 80.00	2. 80.00	2. 80.00	2. 80.00	25. (6.00)	1. 100.00	1. 100.00
2	(France) Anouck Jaubert	506.00	4. 55.00	1. 100.00	1. 100.00	1. 100.00	1. 100.00	8. (40.00)	5. 51.00
3	(Poland) Klaudia Buczek	398.00	1. 100.00	4. 55.00	3. 65.00	11. (31.00)	4. 55.00	7. 43.00	2. 80.00
4	(Poland) Aleksandra Mirosław	367.00	6. 47.00	3. 65.00	4. 55.00	16. (20.00)	2. 80.00	4. 55.00	3. 65.00
5	(Russia) Anna Tsyganova	297.00	3. 65.00	15. 22.00	-	8. 40.00	3. 65.00	3. 65.00	8. 40.00
6	(France) Aurelia Sarisson	266.00	8. 40.00	8. 40.00	5. 51.00	5. 51.00	15. (22.00)	6. 47.00	9. 37.00
7	(Ukraine) Alla Marenych	251.00	16. 20.00	7. 43.00	9. 37.00	18. (16.00)	12. 28.00	2. 80.00	7. 43.00
8	(Poland) Anna Brozek	248.00	9. 37.00	5. 51.00	6. 47.00	4. 55.00	10. 34.00	14. 24.00	14. (24.00)
9	(Poland) Edyta Ropek	223.00	10. 34.00	14. 24.00	14. 24.00	7. 43.00	5. 51.00	-	6. 47.00
10	(Austria) Nina Lach	199.00	13. 26.00	12. 28.00	10. 34.00	13. (26.00)	8. 40.00	9. 37.00	10. 34.00

=== National Teams ===
For National Team Ranking, 3 best results per competition and category were counted (not counting results in brackets).

Rank	Nation	Points	Xiamen	Wujiang	Arco	Villars	Chamonix	Nanjing	Chongqing
1	(Russia) Russian Federation	1892	367	290	(272)	320	281	303	331
2	France	1677	316	306	327	351	239	138	(135)
3	Poland	1661	232	278	309	266	312	(210)	264
4	Ukraine	685	71	83	153	130	(64)	135	113
5	People's Republic of China	658	189	223	-	-	-	145	101
6	Italy	604	86	63	177	81	140	(43)	57
7	Islamic Republic of Iran	486	87	87	(14)	48	67	122	75
8	Czech Republic	458	(20)	37	71	47	127	80	96
9	Austria	424	(26)	28	77	63	69	96	91
10	Indonesia	313	-	-	-	-	-	141	172

== Combined ==
5 best competition results were counted. Participation in at least 2 disciplines was required.

=== Men ===
The results of the ten most successful athletes of the Combined World Cup 2016:

Rank	Name	Points
1	(Canada) Sean McColl	538.00
2	(Austria) Jakob Schubert	439.00
3	(Japan) Kokoro Fujii	423.00
4	(Russia) Rustam Gelmanov	280.00
5	(Japan) Masahiro Higuchi	192.00
6	(South Korea) Kim Han-wool	169.00
7	(Japan) Naoki Shimatani	135.00
8	(France) Manuel Cornu	118.00
9	(Germany) David Firnenburg	72.00
10	(Japan) Meichi Narasaki	44.00

=== Women ===
The results of the ten most successful athletes of the Combined World Cup 2016:

Rank	Name	Points
1	(Slovenia) Janja Garnbret	596.00
2	(Japan) Akiyo Noguchi	447.00
3	(Austria) Jessica Pilz	286.00
4	(Russia) Anna Tsyganova	284.00
5	(Japan) Yuka Kobayashi	234.00
6	(France) Mathilde Becerra	211.00
7	(Austria) Katharina Posch	167.00
8	(Japan) Mei Kotake	133.00
9	(Japan) Aya Onoe	107.00
10	(France) Charlotte Durif	104.00
