= Climbing German Championships =

Competition climbing event

Climbing German Championships are the annual national championships for competition climbing organised by German Alpine Club (Deutscher Alpenverein, DAV). The first championships was held in 1991.

== Lead ==
In 1991, the "Deutscher Sportklettercup" was the first official lead climbing competition series organized by the German Alpine Club. The top athletes at the end of a season qualify for the final event, which is then the German Championships in lead climbing. In 2017, the competition series, which had been held until 2016, was replaced by one individual event per year, the "Deutsche Meisterschaft Lead".

| Edition | Year | Location | Men | Women |
|---|---|---|---|---|
| I. | 1991 | Cologne | Guido Köstermeyer | Andrea Eisenhut |
| II. | 1992 | Dt. Sportklettercup | | |
| III. | 1993 | Dt. Sportklettercup | | |
| IV. | 1994 | Dt. Sportklettercup | | |
| V. | 1995 | Mannheim (Superfinale Dt. Meisterschaft) | Andreas Bindhammer | Marietta Uhden |
| VI. | 1996 | Dt. Sportklettercup | | |
| VII. | 1997 | Dt. Sportklettercup | | |
| VIII. | 1998 | Dt. Sportklettercup | | |
| IX. | 1999 | Dt. Sportklettercup | | |
| X. | 2000 | Dt. Sportklettercup | | |
| XI. | 2001 | Erlangen | Christian Bindhammer | Marietta Uhden |
| XII. | 2002 | Erlangen | Christian Bindhammer | Marietta Uhden |
| XIII. | 2003 | Scheidegg | Christian Bindhammer | Damaris Knorr |
| XIV. | 2004 | Duisburg | Daniel Jung | Marietta Uhden |
| XV. | 2005 | Forchheim | Timo Preußler | Lisa Knoche |
| XVI. | 2006 | Wuppertal | Andreas Bindhammer | Juliane Wurm |
| XVII. | 2007 | Frankenthal | Christian Bindhammer | Juliane Wurm |
| XVIII. | 2008 | Heilbronn | Jan Hojer | Juliane Wurm |
| XIX. | 2009 | Darmstadt | Markus Hoppe | Juliane Wurm |
| XX. | 2010 | Lipsko | Markus Hoppe | Juliane Wurm |
| XXI. | 2011 | Wuppertal | Sebastian Halenke | Julia Winter |
| XXII. | 2012 | Dt. Leadcup | | |
| XXIII. | 2013 | Dt. Leadcup | | |
| XXIV. | 2014 | Dt. Leadcup | | |
| XXV. | 2015 | Dt. Leadcup | | |
| XXVI. | 2016 | Dt. Leadcup | | |
| XXVII. | 2017 | Hilden | Jan Hojer | Hannah Meul |
| XXVIII. | 2018 | Darmstadt | David Firnenburg | Frederike Fell |
| XXIX. | 2019 | Hilden | | |

== Bouldering ==
In 1999, the "DAV Bouldercup" was the first official bouldering competition series organized by the German Alpine Club. The overall winner of the Boulder Cup was also the German Bouldering Champion of that year. In 2003, the series was renamed to "DAV SALOMON Bouldercup" after its sponsor and in 2005, after the first event, it was again renamed to "Deutscher Bouldercup". In 2017, the competition series, which had been held until 2016, was replaced by the individual event, the "Deutsche Meisterschaft Bouldern".

| Year | Location | Men | Women |
|---|---|---|---|
| 1999 | Deutsche Bouldermeisterschaft; Cologne, Immenstadt, Munich | Jürgen Gottfried | Nicola Haager |
| 2000 | DAV Bouldercup; Munich, Immenstadt, Frankenthal | Christoph Finkel | Marietta Uhden |
| 2001 | DAV Bouldercup; Stuttgart, Berchtesgaden, Kempten | Enrico Sanganas | Tanja Bauer |
| 2002 | DAV Bouldercup; Traunstein, Munich, Heilbronn | Markus Hoppe | Nicola Haager |
| 2003 | DAV SALOMON Bouldercup; Munich, Düsseldorf, Traunstein, Garmisch | Timo Preussler | Marietta Uhden |
| 2004 | DAV SALOMON Bouldercup; Munich, Leipzig, Berchtesgaden | Karsten Borowka | Katrin Sedlmayer |
| 2005 | Deutscher Bouldercup; Munich, Leipzig | Markus Hoppe | Lisa Knoche |
| 2006 | Deutscher Bouldercup; Traunstein, Münster, Überlingen | Jonas Baumann | Juliane Wurm |
| 2007 | Deutscher Bouldercup; Munich, Heilbronn, Überlingen | Markus Hoppe | Juliane Wurm |
| 2008 | Deutscher Bouldercup; Munich, Kitzbühel, Pforzheim, Überlingen | André Borowka | Natalie Sailer |
| 2009 | Deutscher Bouldercup; Munich, Kitzbühel, Pforzheim, Überlingen | Stefan Danker | Juliane Wurm |
| 2010 | Deutscher Bouldercup; Munich, Kitzbühel, Überlingen | Stefan Danker | Juliane Wurm |
| 2011 | Deutscher Bouldercup; Munich, Kitzbühel, Frankfurt, Überlingen | Jan Hojer | Juliane Wurm |
| 2012 | Deutscher Bouldercup; Munich, Auerbach, Überlingen | Thomas Tauporn | Julia Winter |
| 2013 | Deutscher Bouldercup; Munich, Auerbach, Friedrichshafen | Stefan Danker | Monika Retschy |
| 2014 | Deutsche Meisterschaft Bouldern; Friedrichshafen | Jan Hojer | Juliane Wurm |
| 2015 | Deutscher Bouldercup; Hanover, Cologne, Friedrichshafen | Jan Hojer | Juliane Wurm |
| 2016 | Deutscher Bouldercup; Hanover, Cologne, Zweibrücken | Jan Hojer | Monika Retschy |
| 2017 | Deutsche Meisterschaft Bouldern; Berlin | David Firnenburg | Monika Retschy |
| 2018 | Deutsche Meisterschaft Bouldern; Friedrichshafen | Yannick Flohé | Alma Bestvater |
| 2019 | Deutsche Meisterschaft Bouldern; Dortmund | Max Prinz | Lucia Dörffel |
| 2020 | Deutsche Meisterschaft Bouldern; Augsburg | Philipp Martin | Hannah Meul |
| 2021 | Deutsche Meisterschaft Bouldern; Bochum | Yannick Flohé | Afra Hönig |
| 2022 | Deutsche Meisterschaft Bouldern; Düsseldorf | Lasse von Freier | Helene Wolf |
| 2023 | Deutsche Meisterschaft Bouldern; Duisburg | Yannick Flohé | Lucia Dörffel |
| 2024 | Deutsche Meisterschaft Bouldern; Pfungstadt | Yannick Flohé | Anna Maria Apel |
| 2025 | Deutsche Meisterschaft Bouldern; Munich | Elias Arriagada Krüger | Lucia Dörffel |

== Speed ==
| Year | Location | Men | Women |
|---|---|---|---|
| 2003 | Cologne | Johannes Lau | Nadine Ruh |
| 2004 | Duisburg | Sebastian Hartung | Lisa Knoche |
| 2005 | Leipzig | Jonas Baumann | Lisa Knoche |
| 2006 | Deutscher Speed-Klettercup; Munich, Frankenthal, Überlingen | Jonas Baumann | Lisa Knoche |
| 2007 | Deutscher Speed-Klettercup; Heilbronn, Wuppertal, Frankenthal | Johannes Lau | Juliane Wurm |
| 2008 | Deutscher Speed-Klettercup; Überlingen, Leipzig, Heilbronn | Jonas Baumann | Isabell Haag |
| 2009 | Deutscher Speed-Klettercup; Überlingen, Friedrichshafen, Darmstadt | Jonas Baumann | Isabell Haag |
| 2010 | Deutscher Speed-Klettercup; Friedrichshafen, Überlingen, Leipzig | Simon Bosler | Andrea Fichtner |
| 2011 | Deutscher Speed-Klettercup; Munich, Überlingen, Friedrichshafen | Maximilian Porscha | Isabell Haag |
| 2012 | Deutscher Speed-Klettercup; Balingen, Munich, Friedrichshafen | Simon Bosler | Hanne Schächtele |
| 2013 | Deutscher Speed-Klettercup; Munich | | |
| 2014 | Munich (open) | 1. Evgenii Vaitsekhovskii (RUS); 4. Joshua Bosler (GER) | 1. Aleksandra Rudzińska (POL); 8. Sophie Rauberger (GER) |
| 2015 | Zürich | | Hanne Schächtele |
| 2016 | Berchtesgaden | Fabian Bosler | Romy Fuchs |
| 2017 | Saarlouis | Fabian Bosler | Florence Grünewald |
| 2018 | Hilden | Yannick Flohé | Frederike Fell |
| 2019 | Duisburg | Jan Hojer | Franziska Rittner |

== Combined ==
| Year | Location | Men | Women |
|---|---|---|---|
| 2018 | Augsburg | Jan Hojer | Frederike Fell |
| 2019 | Augsburg | | |
