= Bouldering at the 2016 IFSC Climbing World Cup =

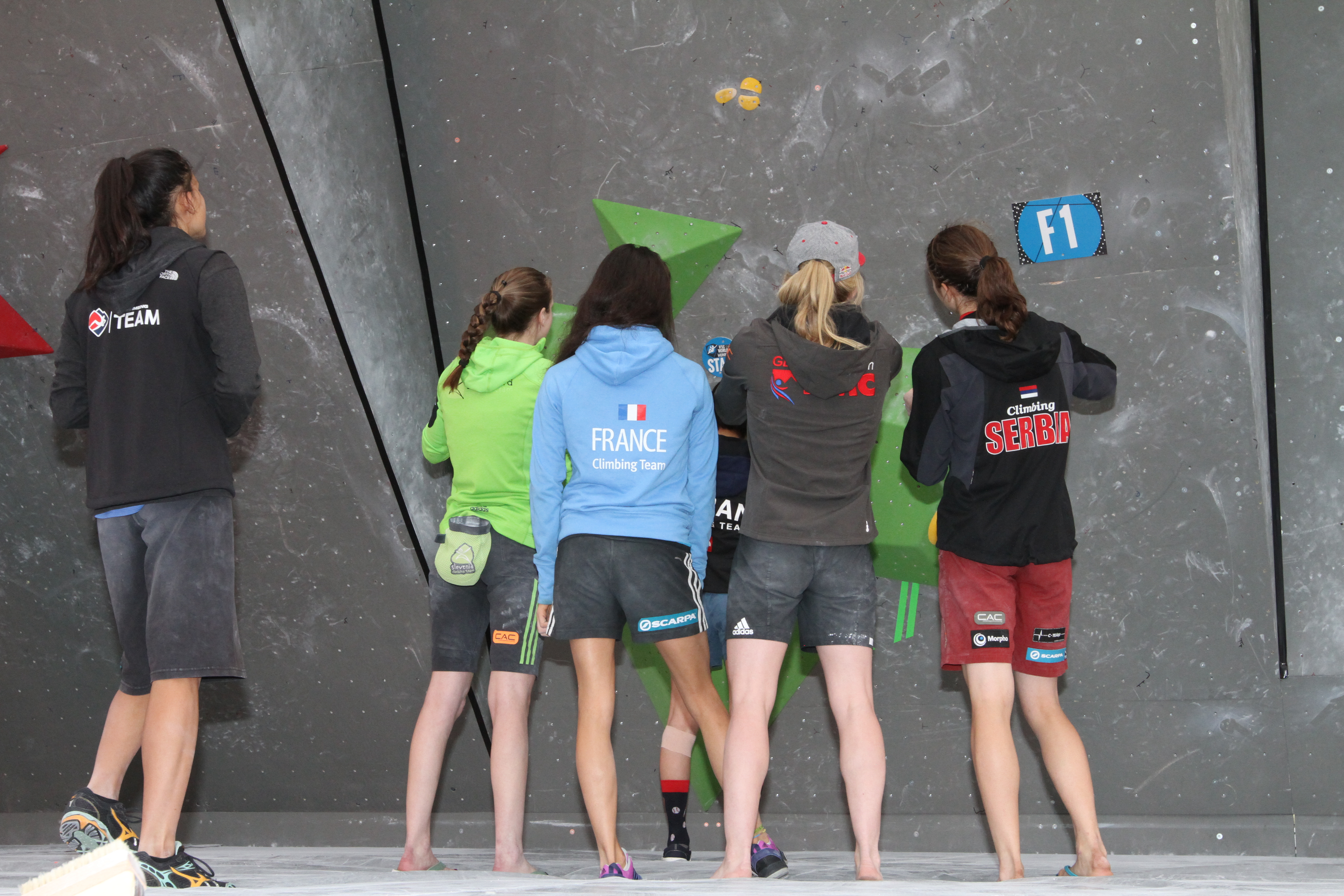
- Climbers inspecting the routes.
- Location: Meiringen, Switzerland Kazo, Japan; Chongqing, China; Navi Mumbai, India; Innsbruck, Austria; Vail, United States Munich, Germany
- Dates: 15 April – 12 June

Champions
- Men: (Japan) Tomoa Narasaki
- Women: (United Kingdom) Shauna Coxsey

The 2016 season of the IFSC Climbing World Cup was the 18th season of the competition. Bouldering competitions were held at the seven stops of the IFSC Climbing World Cup. The bouldering season began on April 15 at the World Cup in Meiringen, and concluded on 12 June at the World Cup in Munich. At each stop a qualifying was held on the first day of the competition, and the semi-final and final rounds were conducted on the second day of the competition. The winners were awarded trophies, the best three finishers received medals, and prize money was awarded to the top six finishers at each stop.

At the end of the season an overall ranking was determined based upon points, which athletes were awarded for finishing in the top 30 of each individual event. Shauna Coxsey won the overall women's World Cup and Tomoa Narasaki won the overall men's World Cup.

== Meiringen, Switzerland (15–16 April) ==
=== Women ===
59 athletes attended the World Cup in Meiringen. Shauna Coxsey (3t5 4b6) won the competition in front of Mélissa Le Nevé (2t4 4b6).

| Rank | Name | Score |
|---|---|---|
| 1 | (United Kingdom) Shauna Coxsey | 3t5 4b6 |
| 2 | (France) Mélissa Le Nevé | 2t4 4b6 |
| 3 | (United States) Megan Mascarenas | 1t1 3b3 |
| 4 | (Japan) Akiyo Noguchi | 0t 3b7 |
| 5 | (Slovenia) Janja Garnbret | 0t 2b2 |
| 6 | (France) Clementine Kaiser | 0t 1b3 |

=== Men ===
84 athletes attended the World Cup in Meiringen. Alexey Rubtsov (2t6 3b10) won the competition in front of Martin Stráník (2t6 2b6).

| Rank | Name | Score |
|---|---|---|
| 1 | (Russia) Alexey Rubtsov | 2t6 3b10 |
| 2 | (Czech Republic) Martin Stráník | 2t6 2b6 |
| 3 | (Netherlands) Jorg Verhoeven | 2t7 4b10 |
| 4 | (France) Alban Levier | 1t1 2b2 |
| 5 | (Austria) Jakob Schubert | 1t3 3b14 |
| 6 | (United Kingdom) Tyler Landman | 1t3 2b4 |

== Kazo, Japan (23–24 April) ==
=== Women ===
53 athletes entered the competition in Kazo. Just as at the previous World Cup Shauna Coxsey (4t7 4b7) won the competition in front of Mélissa Le Nevé (2t2 4b5).

| Rank | Name | Score |
|---|---|---|
| 1 | (United Kingdom) Shauna Coxsey | 4t7 4b7 |
| 2 | (France) Mélissa Le Nevé | 2t2 4b5 |
| 3 | (Japan) Miho Nonaka | 2t3 4b6 |
| 4 | (Switzerland) Petra Klingler | 2t3 3b4 |
| 5 | (France) Fanny Gibert | 1t1 2b4 |
| 6 | (Belgium) Chloe Caulier | 1t3 3b8 |

=== Men ===
69 athletes attended the World Cup in Kazo. Rustam Gelmanov (3t3 4b4) won the competition in front of Michael Piccolruaz (2t2 4b8).

| Rank | Name | Score |
|---|---|---|
| 1 | (Russia) Rustam Gelmanov | 3t3 4b4 |
| 2 | (Italy) Michael Piccolruaz | 2t2 4b8 |
| 3 | (Japan) Kokoro Fujii | 2t4 4b8 |
| 4 | (France) Jeremy Bonder | 2t8 4b12 |
| 5 | (Russia) Dmitrii Sharafutdinov | 1t2 3b8 |
| 6 | (Latvia) Rolands Rugens | 0t 1b2 |

== Chongqing, China (30 April–1 May) ==
=== Women ===
37 athletes attended the World Cup in Chongqing. For the third time in a row Shauna Coxsey (3t7 4b8) won, this time in front of Akiyo Noguchi (3t12 4b13).

| Rank | Name | Score |
|---|---|---|
| 1 | (United Kingdom) Shauna Coxsey | 3t7 4b8 |
| 2 | (Japan) Akiyo Noguchi | 3t12 4b13 |
| 3 | (Japan) Miho Nonaka | 1t3 2b4 |
| 4 | (Japan) Mei Kotake | 1t6 2b6 |
| 5 | (Austria) Karoline Sinnhuber | 0t 2b5 |
| 6 | (Germany) Monika Retschy | 0t 2b6 |

=== Men ===
63 athletes attended the men's competition of the World Cup in Chongqing. Tomoa Narasaki (3t8 3b4) won in front of Jan Hojer (2t3 4b13).

| Rank | Name | Score |
|---|---|---|
| 1 | (Japan) Tomoa Narasaki | 3t8 3b4 |
| 2 | (Germany) Jan Hojer | 2t3 4b13 |
| 3 | (South Korea) Jongwon Chon | 2t5 4b15 |
| 4 | (Japan) Kokoro Fujii | 2t13 4b14 |
| 5 | (Russia) Alexey Rubtsov | 1t8 3b6 |
| 6 | (Netherlands) Jorg Verhoeven | 0t 2b2 |

== Navi Mumbai, India (14–15 May) ==
=== Women ===
38 athletes attended the World Cup in Navi Mumbai. Miho Nonaka (2t4 3b6) won in front of Monika Retschy (1t1 4b10). Shauna Coxsey, winner of the three previous World Cups this season, was eliminated in the semi-final.

| Rank | Name | Score |
|---|---|---|
| 1 | (Japan) Miho Nonaka | 2t4 3b6 |
| 2 | (Germany) Monika Retschy | 1t1 4b10 |
| 3 | (Japan) Akiyo Noguchi | 1t1 2b2 |
| 4 | (France) Mélissa Le Nevé | 1t1 2b2 |
| 5 | (South Korea) Sol Sa | 1t1 2b6 |
| 6 | (Austria) Katharina Saurwein | 0t 2b7 |

=== Men ===
42 athletes attended the World Cup in Navi Mumbai. Kokoro Fujii (3t4 4b4) won in front of Tomoa Narasaki (3t6 4b7).

| Rank | Name | Score |
|---|---|---|
| 1 | (Japan) Kokoro Fujii | 3t4 4b4 |
| 2 | (Japan) Tomoa Narasaki | 3t6 4b7 |
| 3 | (Russia) Alexey Rubtsov | 3t11 4b11 |
| 4 | (South Korea) Jongwon Chon | 3t17 4b19 |
| 5 | (Russia) Rustam Gelmanov | 1t3 3b5 |
| 6 | (France) Jeremy Bonder | 0t 2b4 |

== Innsbruck, Austria (21–22 May) ==
=== Women ===
68 athletes attended the World Cup in Innsbruck. Shauna Coxsey (4t8 4b8) won her fourth World Cup of the season. Janja Garnbret (4t10 4b9) came in second.

| Rank | Name | Score |
|---|---|---|
| 1 | (United Kingdom) Shauna Coxsey | 4t8 4b8 |
| 2 | (Slovenia) Janja Garnbret | 4t10 4b9 |
| 3 | (Japan) Miho Nonaka | 4t13 4b10 |
| 4 | (United States) Megan Mascarenas | 2t2 3b3 |
| 5 | (Austria) Anna Stöhr | 2t11 4b8 |
| 6 | (Japan) Akiyo Noguchi | 1t3 2b2 |
| 7 | (South Korea) Sol Sa | 0t 3b3 |

=== Men ===
108 athletes attended the World Cup in Innsbruck. Jongwon Chon (3t4 3b4) won in front of Tomoa Narasaki (2t9 4b13).

| Rank | Name | Score |
|---|---|---|
| 1 | (South Korea) Jongwon Chon | 3t4 3b4 |
| 2 | (Japan) Tomoa Narasaki | 2t9 4b13 |
| 3 | (Canada) Sean McColl | 1t3 2b4 |
| 4 | (Latvia) Rolands Rugens | 1t3 2b8 |
| 5 | (Russia) Dmitrii Sharafutdinov | 0t 2b10 |
| 6 | (Czech Republic) Martin Stranik | 0t 0b |

== Vail, United States (11–12 June) ==
=== Women ===
47 athletes attended the World Cup in Vail. Megan Mascarenas (4t5 4b5) won in front of Shauna Coxsey (3t4 4b7). Coxsey's second place secured that she would win the overall 2016 Bouldering World Cup regardless of her finish at the final World Cup in Munich.

| Rank | Name | Score |
|---|---|---|
| 1 | (United States) Megan Mascarenas | 4t5 4b5 |
| 2 | (United Kingdom) Shauna Coxsey | 3t4 4b7 |
| 3 | (Austria) Anna Stöhr | 2t5 3b4 |
| 4 | (France) Mélissa Le Nevé | 2t5 3b7 |
| 5 | (Japan) Miho Nonaka | 1t1 2b4 |
| 6 | (United States) Alex Puccio | 1t3 1b3 |

=== Men ===
58 athletes attended the World Cup in Vail. Kokoro Fujii (2t4 3b5) won in front of Tomoa Narasaki (1t1 4b7).

| Rank | Name | Score |
|---|---|---|
| 1 | (Japan) Kokoro Fujii | 2t4 3b5 |
| 2 | (Japan) Tomoa Narasaki | 1t1 4b7 |
| 3 | (Russia) Alexey Rubtsov | 1t1 4b10 |
| 4 | (Japan) Yoshiyuki Ogata | 1t1 3b3 |
| 5 | (Russia) Rustam Gelmanov | 1t3 3b5 |
| 6 | (Canada) Sean McColl | 0t 3b5 |

== Munich, Germany (11–12 June) ==
=== Women ===
84 athletes attended the World Cup in Munich, making it the largest competition of the season. Miho Nonaka (3t7 4b8) won in front of Shauna Coxsey (2t2 3b3), who had already secured the overall seasonal title at the previous stop in Vail.

| Rank | Name | Score |
|---|---|---|
| 1 | (Japan) Miho Nonaka | 3t7 4b8 |
| 2 | (United Kingdom) Shauna Coxsey | 2t2 3b3 |
| 3 | (Japan) Akiyo Noguchi | 2t2 3b3 |
| 4 | (France) Mélissa Le Nevé | 2t3 3b4 |
| 5 | (Serbia) Staša Gejo | 1t2 3b3 |
| 6 | (Slovenia) Julija Kruder | 0t 3b10 |

=== Men ===
140 athletes attended the World Cup in Munich, making it the largest competition of the season. By virtue of winning the Munich competition Tomoa Narasaki (4t6 4b5) won his fifth consecutive medal at World Cups this season, thus also claiming the overall seasonal title. 2015 seasonal champion Jongwon Chon (3t5 3b3) finished second.

| Rank | Name | Score |
|---|---|---|
| 1 | (Japan) Tomoa Narasaki | 4t6 4b5 |
| 2 | (South Korea) Jongwon Chon | 3t5 3b3 |
| 3 | (Russia) Alexey Rubtsov | 2t2 3b8 |
| 4 | (Germany) David Firnenburg | 2t3 3b3 |
| 5 | (France) Mickaël Mawem | 1t2 4b8 |
| 6 | (France) Manuel Cornu | 1t3 4b9 |

== Final ranking ==
=== Women ===
| Rank | Name | Points |
|---|---|---|
| 1 | (United Kingdom) Shauna Coxsey | 560 |
| 2 | (Japan) Miho Nonaka | 446 |
| 3 | (France) Mélissa Le Nevé | 368 |
| 4 | (Japan) Akiyo Noguchi | 352 |
| 5 | (Germany) Monika Retschy | 236 |
| 6 | (France) Fanny Gibert | 223 |
| 7 | (United States) Megan Mascarenas | 220 |
| 8 | (Switzerland) Petra Klingler | 192 |
| 9 | (France) Clementine Kaiser | 175 |
| 10 | (South Korea) Sol Sa | 171 |

=== Men ===
| Rank | Name | Points |
|---|---|---|
| 1 | (Japan) Tomoa Narasaki | 560 |
| 2 | (Japan) Kokoro Fujii | 446 |
| 3 | (Russia) Alexey Rubtsov | 368 |
| 4 | (South Korea) Jongwon Chon | 352 |
| 5 | (Russia) Rustam Gelmanov | 236 |
| 6 | (Canada) Sean McColl | 223 |
| 7 | (Czech Republic) Martin Stráník | 220 |
| 8 | (France) Jeremy Bonder | 192 |
| 9 | (Germany) Jan Hojer | 175 |
| 10 | (Slovenia) Jernej Kruder | 171 |

=== National teams ===
| Rank | Nation | Points |
|---|---|---|
| 1 | Japan | 1964 |
| 2 | France | 1347 |
| 3 | Great Britain | 1087 |
| 4 | Russia | 779 |
| 5 | Austria | 682 |
