= Tim Emmett =

British adventure climber

Tim Emmett (born 1974), is a British-born adventure climber and climbing author. Considered one of the best all-round climbers, his disciplinary styles have set the tone for new forms of modern climbing. Those include ice-climbing, rock climbing, deep-water soloing (of which he is considered a pioneer) and alpine climbing. Emmett has established the hardest waterfall ice-climbs in the world, and was the first to climb grades of W10 and above. In rock climbing, his achievements include establishing Muy Caliente! in Pembroke, Wales, and repeating notable high-grade traditional routes such as The Path and Superman.

== Early life ==
Tim Emmett was born in Windsor in England, and went to school at Cothill House and Richard Huish College, where he got his A-levels in Biology, Chemistry and Mathematics. While at Huish, Emmett started climbing on a school trip at the age of 15 to a local crag called Chudleigh Rocks. In 1993, he went on to study Marine Zoology at Bangor University, North Wales, where he became a prominent climber, featuring on the magazine cover of On The Edge while still at university.

== Career ==
=== Deep-water soloing ===
Emmett is regarded as a pioneer of deep-water soloing (DWS), and in 2003, a short film on DWS called Psicobloc by American brothers Josh and Brett Lowell chronicled Emmett and Klem Loskot's 2001 development of DWS routes in Cova Del Diablo in Mallorca, Spain, which inspired US rock climber Chris Sharma to get involved in DWS. In 2019, adventure filmmaker Jon Glassberg, created another DWS short film called Deep Water featured on Emmett and US rock-climber Kyra Condie developing DWS routes in Ha Long Bay in Vietnam.

=== Ice climbing ===
Emmett's notable ice-climbs include the first ever waterfall ice climb at grade W10 (Spray On, in 2010 with Will Gadd, at Helmcken Falls), at grade W11 (Wolverine, in 2011 with Klemen Premrl, at Helmcken Falls), at grade W12 (Interstellar Spice, in 2016 with Klemen Premrl, at Helmcken Falls), and at grade W13 (Misson to Mars, in 2020 with Klemen Premrl, at Helmcken Falls). From 2002 to 2007, Emmett made the podium 4 times in tour events of the World Ice Climbing Championships. In 2015, Emmett was the Red Bull "White Cliffs Champion".

=== Rock climbing ===
Emmett's rock climbs include some of the highest-grade traditional routes with notable ascents including the 2017 repeat of Sonnie Trotter's Superman in Squamish (5.14c, F8c+), and the 2016 repeat of Trotter's The Path in Lake Louise (5.14R, F8b+). In 2010, Emmett established Muy Caliente!, an early contender for the first traditional grade of E10 in Pembroke in Wales.

=== Alpine climbing ===
For high altitude alpine climbing, Emmett was nominated for a 2006 Piolet D'or for climbing a new route on the south east pillar of Kedar Dome 6,831 metres (22,411 ft) in the Garhwal Himalaya with Ian Parnell 2006. In 2019, Emmett and his team had to abandon an expedition to Mount Everest due to the avalanche risk on the route they were planning.

=== Para-alpinism ===
With para-alpinism, two adventure sports are merged, BASE jumping, and big wall climbing. After ascending a large wall on vertical rock, Emmett put a parachute on to descend down. Only a handful of people do this type of climbing, and Emmett retired from it at the age of 40 due to its high risk of fatality. Emmett has also done wingsuit flying.

== Media ==
Emmett has appeared in more than 50 magazines including Outside Magazine, Sports Illustrated, Gripped, Grip, Desnivel, GQ and others. Emmett has been the subject of several short films on climbing, including Psiobloc (2003), Dosage II (2004), Dosage III (2005), Welsh Connections (2009), Mountain (2017), and Deep Water (2019).

Emmett has made several appearances on the BBC as a presenter and guest, including: Ultimate Rock Climb with Julia Bradbury (2007), The Great Climb with British climber Dave MacLeod (2010), and Top Gear (episode 2, season 7) with Jeremy Clarkson racing up a mountain with Leo Houlding (2005). Emmett has worked with Steve Backshall on his children's show.

In 2005, Emmett wrote a book with fellow British-climber Neil Gresham called Preposterous Tales, about their climbing exploits around the world.

He has presented the Duke Of Edinburgh Award three times at St. James's Palace.

== Personal life ==
As of 2016, Emmett was living in Squamish, British Columbia, Canada and was married.

== See also ==
- Mountain Hardwear, Emmett's long-term sponsor
- Mountain, 2017 film that includes Tim Emmett
