= Es Pontàs =

Sea-arch in Mallorca, Spain

- Natural arch
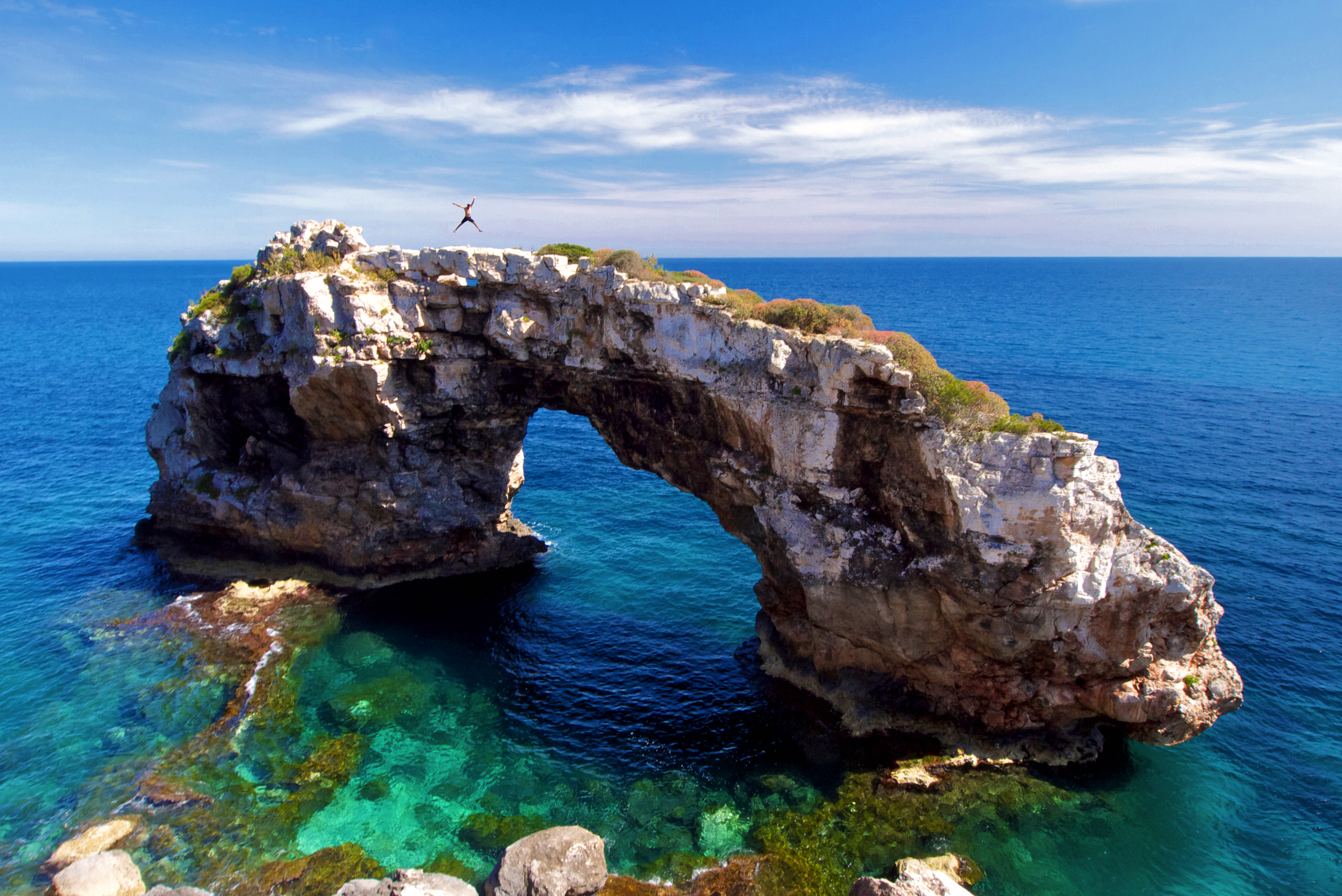
- Es Pontàs as seen from 'Mirador Es Pontas'

- Location within Mallorca
- Coordinates: 39°19′32″N 3°08′41″E
- Location: Santanyí (Balearic Islands, Spain)
- Elevation: 20 m (65 ft)

Es Pontàs ("the big bridge" in the Catalan language) is a natural arch made from limestone in the southeastern part of the island of Mallorca in Spain. The arch is located on the coastline between the Cala Santanyí and Cala Llombards in the municipality of Santanyí, and is approximately 20 metres (66 ft) in height. Es Pontàs is only accessible by boat or by swimming, and is a popular scenic location for tourists to Mallorca (particularly at sunrise and sunset) who view it from the 'Mirador Es Pontas'.

== Climbing area ==
The arch is also a deep-water soloing (DWS) climbing area, and the first routes in the guidebook date from circa 2003 with Stop Look and Listen 6a+ (5.10b) and Treasure Island 6b (5.10c). The area is most noted for Chris Sharma's DWS routes, and particularly Pontax 8c (5.14b) in 2005, and Es Pontàs 9a+ (5.15a) in 2006. Es Pontàs was the first-ever DWS route at the grade of 9a+ (5.15a), and at the time that Sharma made the first ascent, it was one of only a handful of rock climbing routes in the world at that grade. Sharma's ascent of Es Pontàs is captured in the 2007 film, King Lines.

== See also ==
- Azure Window, sea arch in Malta
- Durdle Door, sea arch in England
