= Deep-water soloing =

Free solo rock-climbing over water

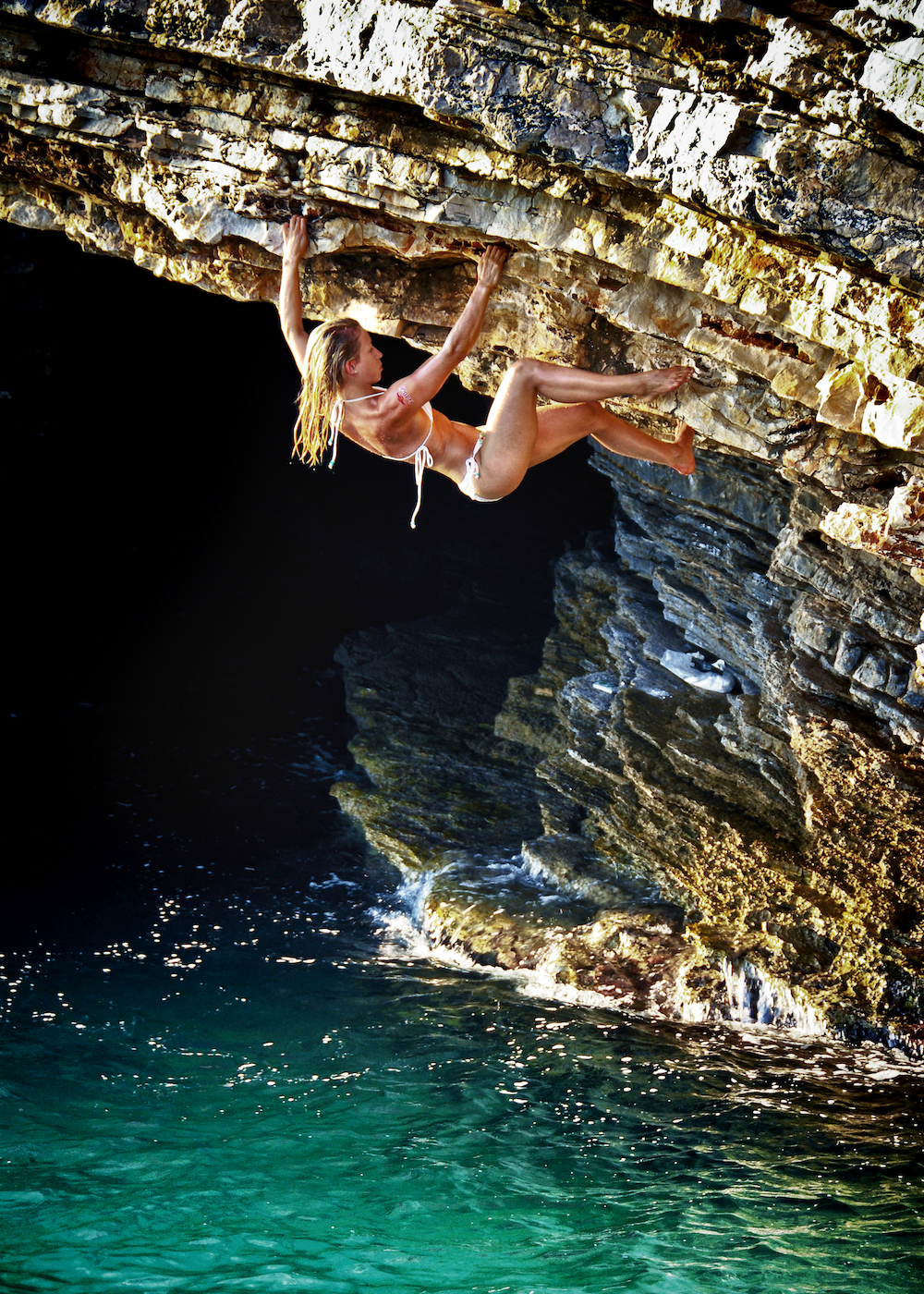
Natalija Gros deep-water soloing at Kamenjak, Croatia (from the 2009 climbing film, Le Tango Vertical)

Deep-water soloing (DWS), also known as psicobloc (from "psycho-bouldering"), is a form of free solo climbing where a fall should result in the climber landing safely in deep water below the route. DWS is considered safer than normal free solo climbing but riskier than normal bouldering, because of several risks of its own, including trauma from uncontrolled high-speed water entry, injury from hitting hazards above and below the water while falling, and drowning in rough or tidal seas.

Deep-water soloing traces its roots to the discovery in 1978 of Cova Del Dimoni in Mallorca by Miquel Riera, and was further popularised and developed by British climbers Tim Emmett, Mike Robertson, and Neil Gresham, and Austrian climber Klem Loskot. DWS came to worldwide attention with Chris Sharma's 2006 ascent of the dramatic Mallorcan sea arch of Es Pontàs, which at the climbing grade of 5.15a (9a+) made it one of the hardest rock-climbing routes in the world—of any type—at the time.

DWS uses sport-climbing grading systems (mostly French grades) with an additional S-grading system to reflect the unique risks of DWS on any route; DWS routes can vary from less than 5 metres (16 ft) to over 40 metres (130 ft) in height at the extreme end. Competition deep-water soloing has become popular, particularly in head-to-head "dueling" formats, and the "Psicobloc Masters Series" (2011, 2012–2018), which later evolved into the "Psicobloc Open Series" is one of the most notable DWS competitions.

== Description ==
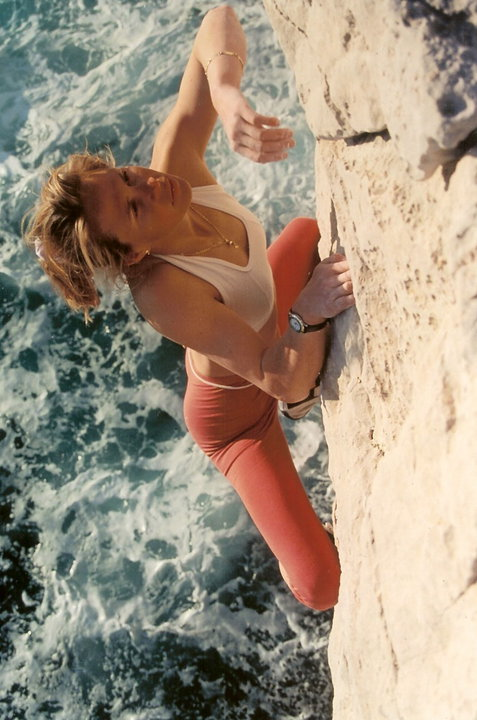
Isabelle Patissier deep-water soloing on the sea cliffs at Calanques in France

Deep-water soloing, or DWS, is free solo climbing where any fall should land the climber in deep water below the route. It is thus considered a safer version of free solo climbing. It is not considered as safe as bouldering as the DWS climber encounters hazards that are unique to DWS, including injury or trauma on impact with the water or hitting hazards in the water (particularly from higher falls or uncontrolled falls), risk of drowning in rough seas and hitting the rock face before entering the water. Changing tides is a serious risk in DWS, as routes that might be safe at high tide can become dangerous at lower tide, bringing underwater hazards into play.

DWS routes can vary from safe bouldering-type overhanging routes that are only a few metres in height above calm clear deep water, where any fall is almost guaranteed to result in clean low-speed entry into the water; which are graded S0-S1 DWS routes. At the other end of the scale are DWS routes that are high (e.g. over 15 metres (49 ft), and going up to even 40–45 metres (131–148 ft) in height at the most extreme level), where climbers need to push themselves off the rock face to ensure that they enter the water cleanly, and control their surface impact as it will be at high speed; which are graded S2-S3 DWS routes.

=== Types of routes and locations ===
While DWS can be done on any rock face over or beside the water, it is more suited to certain areas that have overhanging rock faces (i.e. ensuring the DWS climber lands in the water), have clear and deep water (i.e. so that any underwater hazards can be identified and/or avoided), and are in warmer climates (so the DWS climber does not have to wear a wetsuit, and the water is generally calmer).

Several locations that meet most of the above criteria have become established DWS locations:

- Mallorca in Spain (and the Cova del Diablo cliffs in particular, and Cala Varques), the birthplace of DWS, and contains many of the world's hardest and most famous DWS routes, including Es Pontàs at 9a+ (5.15a), Alasha and Black Pearl at 9a (5.14d).
- Other leading European DWS locations include Croatia (Split and Sustipan), Portugal (Azores), Sardinia (Capo Testa and Capo Caccia), Malta (cliffs of Gozo and Comino), and the sea cliffs of the Calanques in France.
- In Britain and Ireland, DWS locations include Dorset, Devon, and Pembrokeshire, and Ailladie in Ireland.
- In Southeast Asia, leading DWS locations include Thailand (all along Railay Beach), Vietnam (Hạ Long Bay and Cát Bà Island in particular), Malaysia (at Langkawi), and the Philippines (at El Nido, Palawan).
- In North America, DWS locations include Clear Creek Reservoir in Winslow, Arizona, and Becket Quarry in Becket, Massachusetts.

== History ==
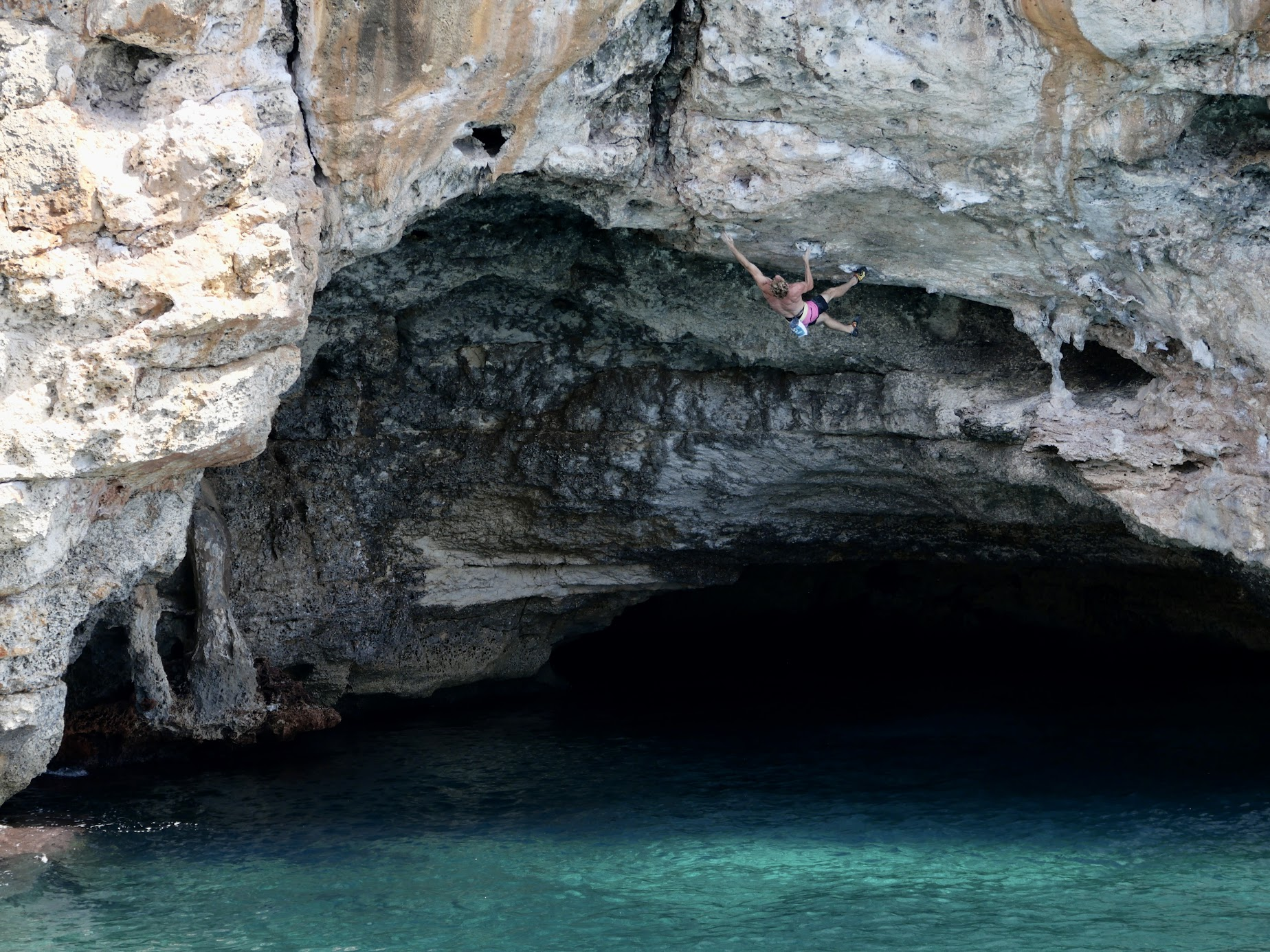
Climber on Smash it in! 8a (5.13b), Cala Varques, Mallorca

Deep-water soloing has its roots in Mallorca when in 1978, Miquel Riera became frustrated with the aid climbing routes in his local area so he went to Porto Pi, Palma, with fellow climbers Jaume Payeras, Eduardo Moreno, and Pau Bover to find routes they could free climb. The area was Mallorca's first bouldering venue, and as time progressed, Riera moved onto the nearby sea cliffs where they established DWS routes. Riera and his companions named it "psicobloc" (translated into English, means "Psycho Bouldering"), and published articles and photographs in climbing magazines on their activities. In the later half ot the 1980s, Miquel, supported by Pepino Lopez, Xisco Meca, Pepe Link, and Miki Palmer, had discovered the short sea cliffs of Cala Varques, Cala Serena, and the impressive cliff in Porto Cristo, now known as Cova del Diablo. Three notable routes were established at Cova del Diablo: Surfing in the Bar, Surfer Dead, and Surfing Bird.

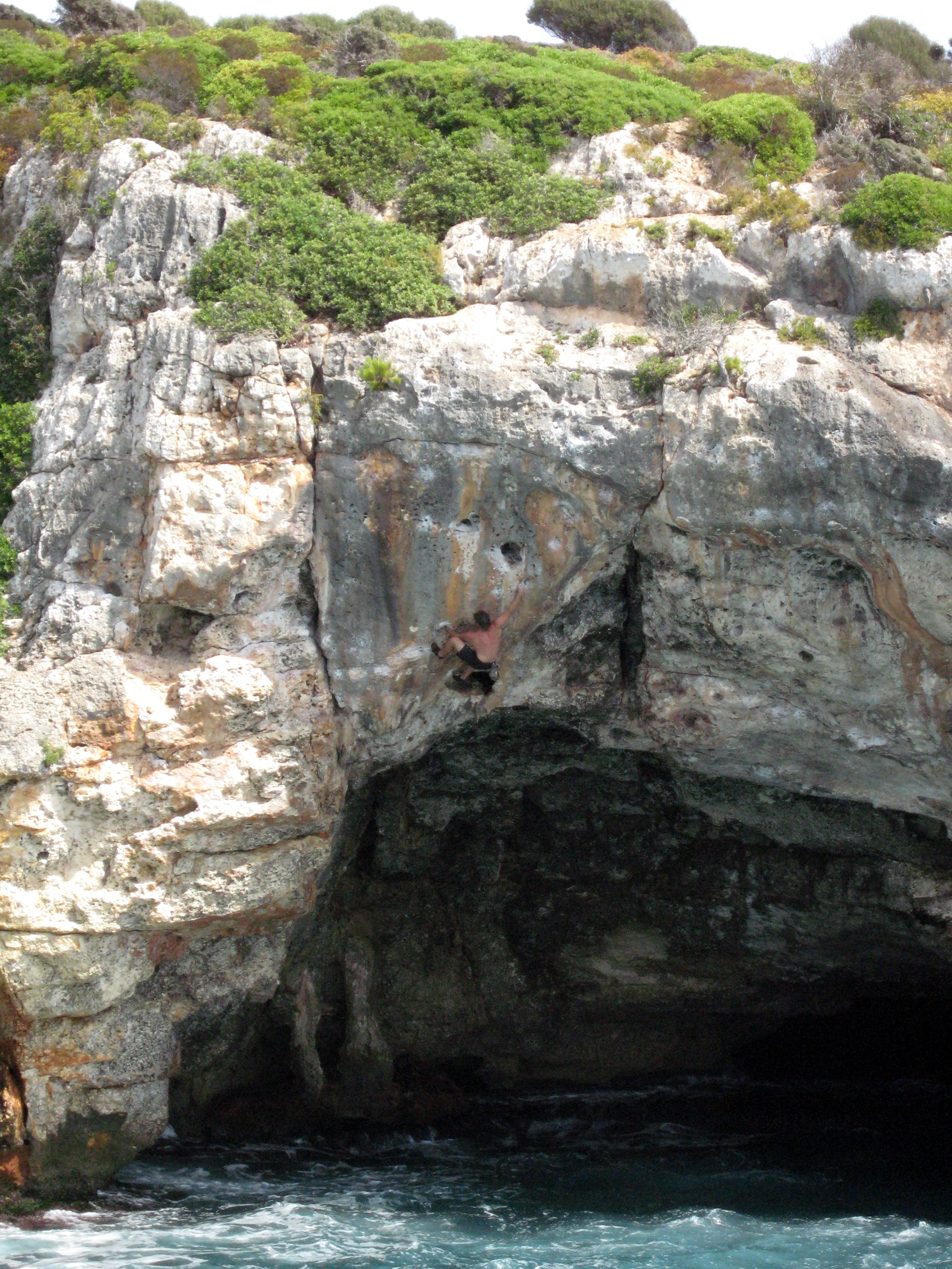
Climber on Metrosexual 7a+ (5.12a), Cala Varques, Mallorca

The 1990s saw a large increase in interest in Britain for what was called "Deep Water Soloing" (DWS), starting with Nick Buckley's ascent of The Conger (1983). Britain's southern coast saw new DWS routes from the Cook brothers, Mike Robertson, Steve Taylor, and Pete Oxley. The British Climbers' Club published the 1996 guide, Into the Blue: A guide to Deep Water Soloing in Dorset, the world's first-ever DWS guidebook, and proposed an S-grading system and climbing style to Britain. In 2001, Miquel contacted British climber Tim Emmett highlighting Cova Del Diablo and led to a trip by Emmett with other leading climbers such as Mike Robertson, Neil Gresham, and Austrian Klem Loskot. In February 2002, Robertson wrote an article titled 'Sympathy for the Devil' in Climber magazine describing Cova Del Diablo and the twenty-six new routes (from 4+ to 8a) that Emmett's party added to the existing three routes.

The publication of Robertson's article led to more international teams coming to Cova Del Diablo to create additional routes and explore new Mallorcan cliffs such as Cala Sa Nau, Cala Barques, Cala Mitjana, and Porto Cristo Novo. These teams also introduced Dutch climber Toni Lamprecht to Mallorcan DWS, which led to a significant increase in new routes being created, chiefly at Cala Barques. DWS became more mainstream and globally recognized amongst climbers when short films were made by climbing filmmakers such as Udo Neumann in 2001, and Josh and Brett Lowell in 2003. The films featured some of DWS's pioneers: Emmett, Lamprecht, Klem Loskot, and a newcomer to the style, Chris Sharma.

In September 2006, DWS came to international attention when Sharma completed the right-hand finish to a line that climbed the underside of the dramatic 20-metre (66 ft) Es Pontàs arch in Mallorca and carried a grade of 9a+ (5.15a), the hardest-ever DWS grade. Sharma had been looking for a DWS-equivalent to his 2001 sport climb, Realization, also 9a+ (5.15a), and his first free ascent was featured in the 2007 film King Lines.

== Competition DWS ==
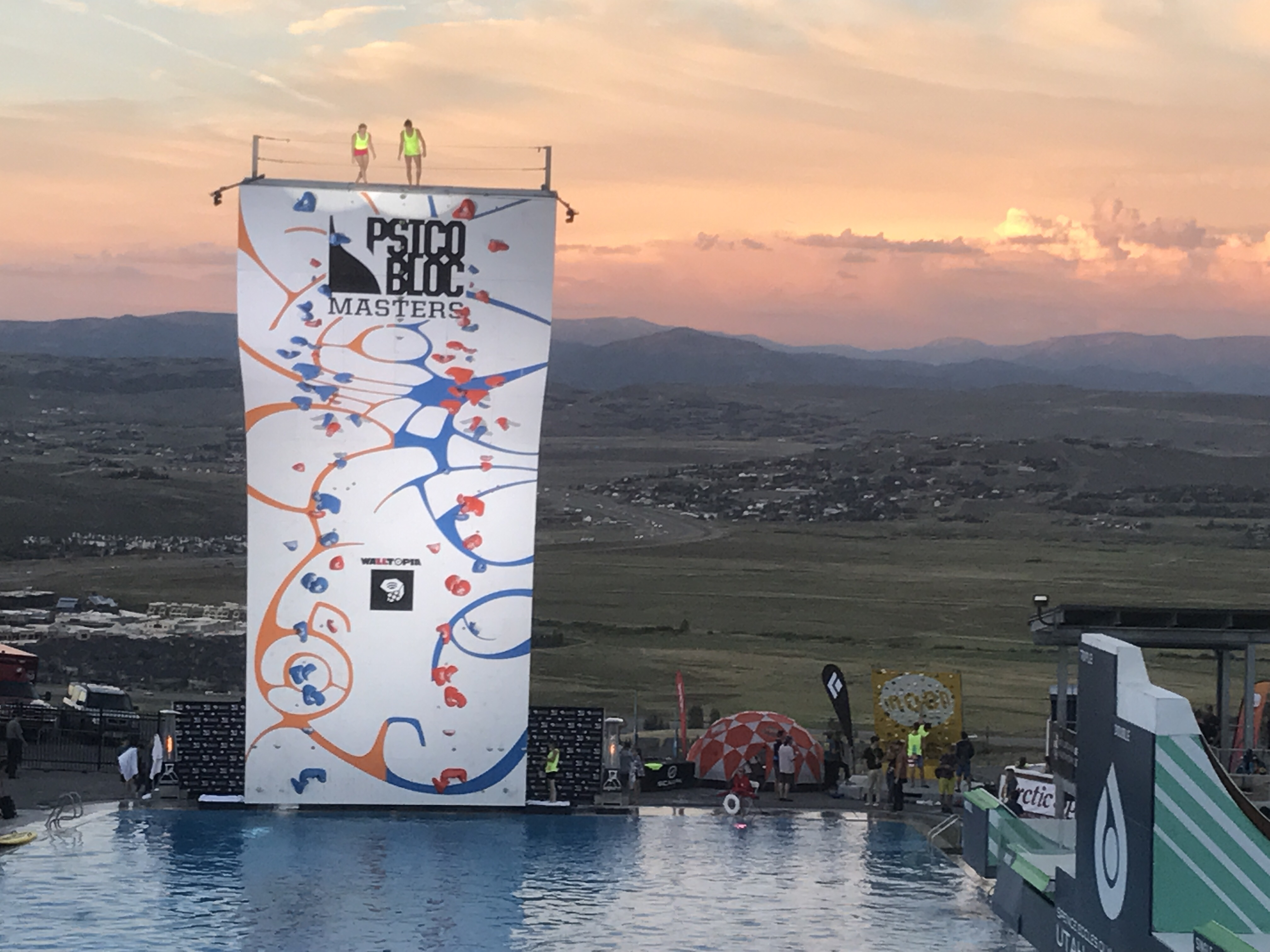
Psicobloc Masters, Olympic Park

Numerous competitions have been held in DWS, the most notable being the "Psicobloc Masters Series" that began in 2011 in Bilbao, Spain, organized by Spanish climber Finuco Martinez. From 2013 to 2018, the "Psicobloc Masters" was held in Utah Olympic Park and organized by a consortium that included Chris Sharma. In 2019, the series moved to Montreal, and was branded the "Psicobloc Open Series", and is now held at various venues around the world. The Psicobloc Open format is a circa 50-foot (15 m) outdoor artificial climbing wall that severely overhangs a circa 12-foot (3.7 m) swimming pool. Climbers "duel" in head-to-head races on the wall in a series of knock-out rounds, like in competition speed climbing, until the ultimate winner is decided. Climbers compete in men's, women's, and youth's formats.

Oher deep-water soloing (or psicobloc) competitions around the world have followed a similar format to the Psicobloc Open of head-to-head races on a similar height artificial climbing wall. Not all DWS competitions follow this approach, and others have used a typical competition lead climbing or competition bouldering format where the climbers—climbing alone and not head-to-head—try to get to the highest point possible (or the most highest points on several shorter routes), in a set time allowance; these have tended to be outdoor routes that are on natural rock surfaces. A notable example was the once-off 2016 PsicoRoc DWS competition held over West Virginia's Summersville Lake, which was the first-ever DWS competition in the United States on natural rock, and which was chronicled in the award winning short-documentary film, Wild and Wonderful.

== Risks ==
DWS presents a number of specific risks not normally encountered in rock climbing.

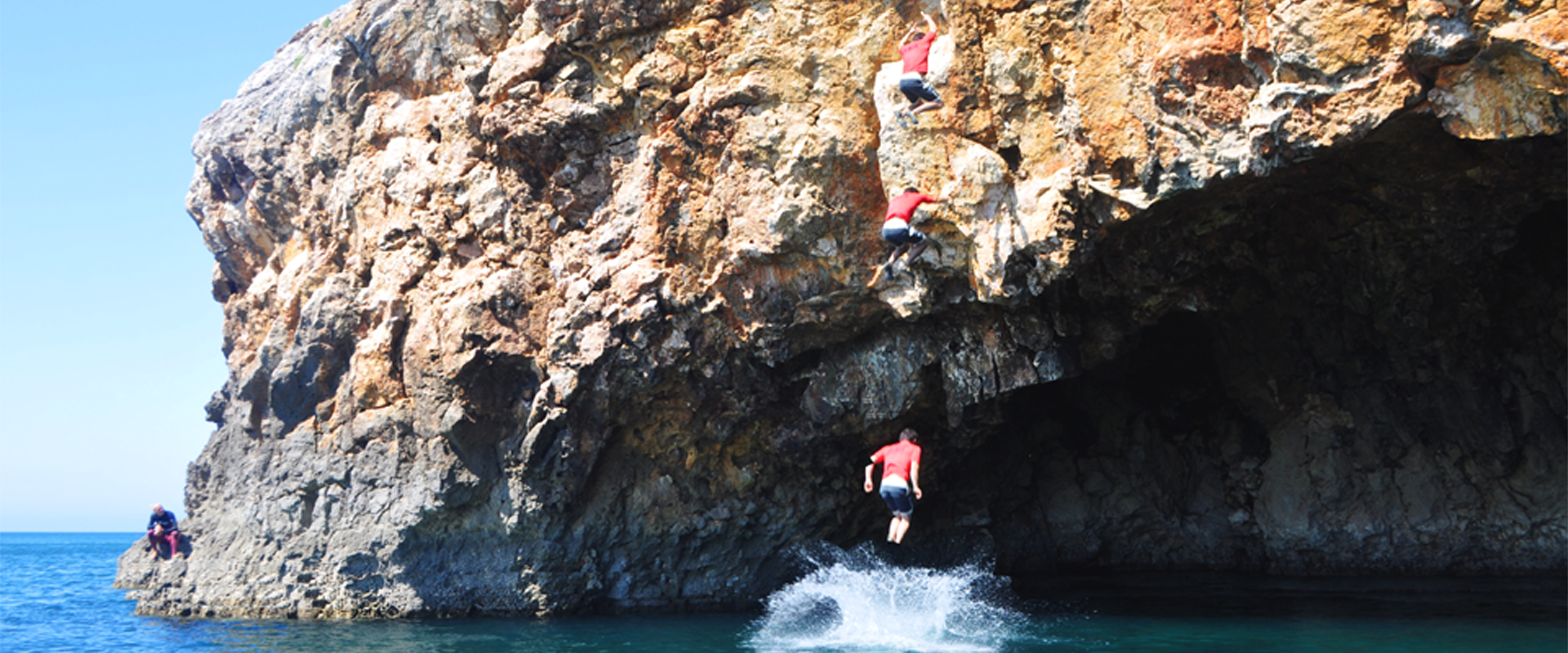
Sequence of a DWS climber making an "Armchair Landing"

- Water entry: A fall into deep water from a height of over 10 metres (33 ft) can seriously injure the climber, particularly if the entry is not controlled. On difficult DWS routes, a fall can happen spontaneously and from a position where the climber was on an overhang—thus falling onto their back. DWS climbers build up their skills of controlling body position on water entry at the lower S-grades.
- Underwater hazards: There may be rock features under the water's surface that the falling DWS may hit on a forceful or high-speed water entry. DWS climbers sometimes use an "armchair landing" technique to limit the depth of water they penetrate which involves adopting a quasi-sitting position while falling. This technique is very effective and can absorb a 30-foot (9.1 m) fall in just 5 feet (1.5 m) of water, but "armchair landings" are difficult to master and dangerous at greater heights.
- Effect of tides: All of the S-grades are specific to high tides. A DWS route graded S0-S1 at high tide, can become an S2 or S3 at low tides (e.g. Neil Gresham's 2012 DWS route Olympiad in Pembroke in Wales, has a DWS grade of F8b S1 at high tide, but is a non-DWS route with a traditional climbing English grade of E10 6c at low tide); particularly if underwater features come increasingly into play. DWS climbers need to understand the tidal system in the area and plan their climbs accordingly.
- Rough seas: DWS climbers have drowned, overcome by rough or swelling seas from which they were unable to escape (and often in a fatigued state). DWS climbers avoid climbing alone and have a support climber either in an inflatable dingy or in a position to lower a rope from above.

While DWS is considered safer than free solo climbing, climbers have died, particularly due to drowning, while deep-water soloing.

== Equipment ==
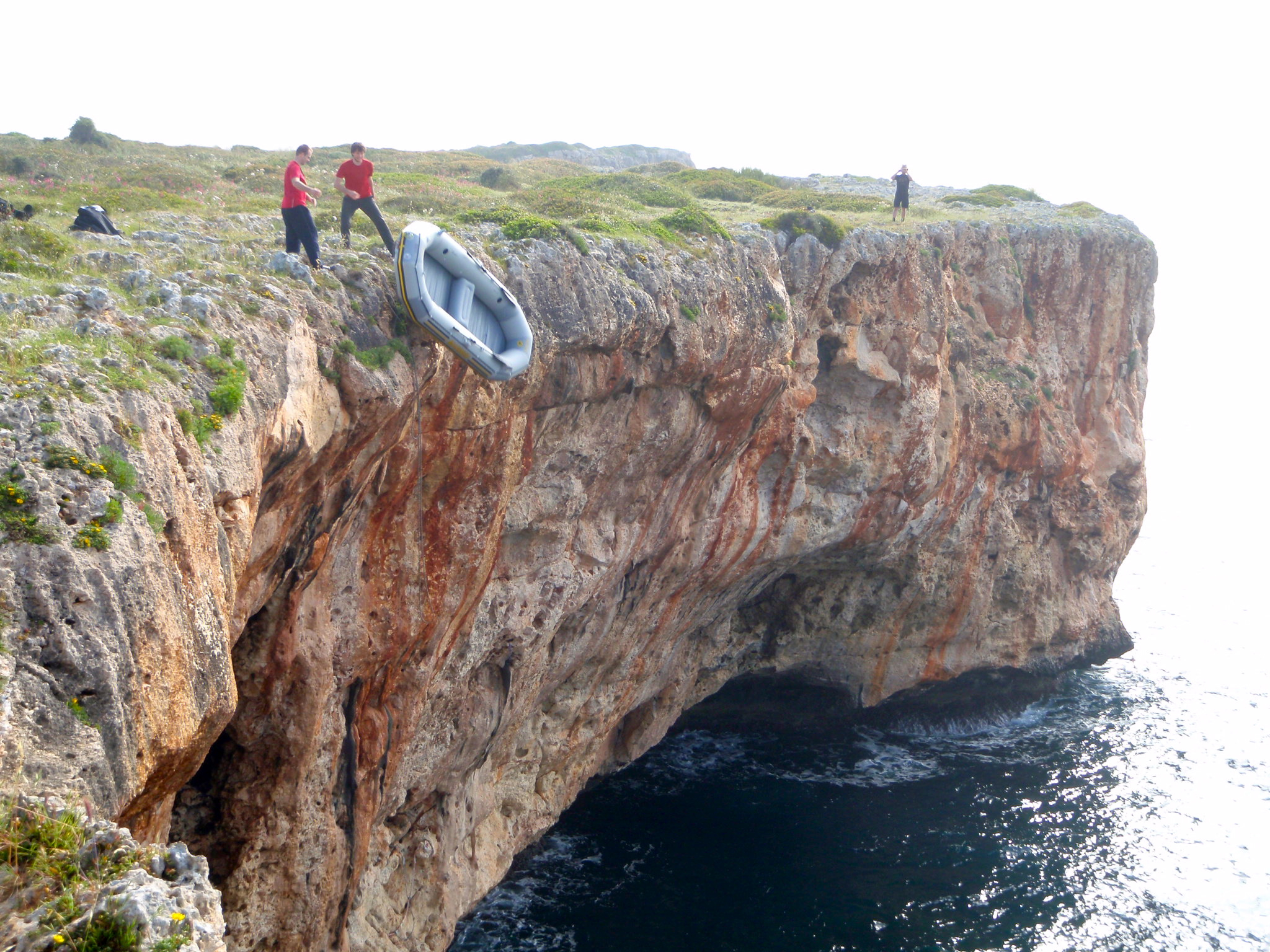
Climbers launching a dingy at Cova del Diablo, Mallorca

Like free solo climbing, DWS needs very little climbing equipment outside of the chalk bag and rock climbing shoes. A number of items of equipment have become common amongst DWS climbers, including:

- Bench seats/ladders. Some DWS routes have makeshift wooden benches and small rope ladders installed at the base of the routes, hanging from pieces of protection, to enable the DWS climber to access the route, and rest/dry-off between attempts.
- Inflatable dingy. DWS climbers sometimes employ a lightweight inflatable dingy that they can anchor at the bottom of the route and use for both recovery after falls, and resting between attempts; it can also be used by a second DWS climber for stand-by assistance.
- Tape harnesses. DWS climbers do not typically use a climbing harness; however, many DWS routes require the climber to abseil down the rock face to access the route (unless they can use the inflatable dingy). For this, they can use a makeshift harness made from a climbing sling.

== Grading ==
=== French sport grades ===
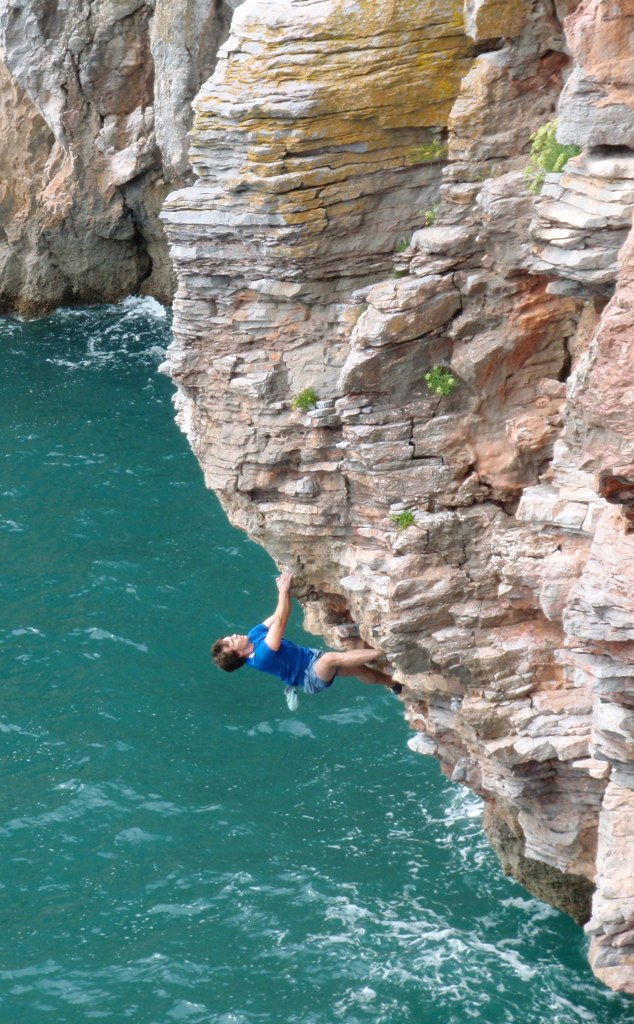
DWS climber on White Rhino Tea (f7a S1), Devon, England

The main DWS grade is technical grade, which reflects the difficulty of the hardest movements or sequences on the route. The French sport climbing grades (e.g., 6a, 6b, 6c, ... 8b, 8b+, 8c, etc.) are generally the most popular technical grades in European DWS. In England, the traditional English grading system is sometimes used, although where French sport grades are quoted in England an "f" suffix is often placed before the grade to clarify that it is a French grade and not a British grade (e.g. f6a to distinguish from the British E4 6a).

=== S-grades ===
In 1995, British DWS climbers developed an S-grade system to grade for the objective level of danger that deep water soloing a given route presented to the climber in addition to the "technical difficulty" grade (above). British climbers felt that the English E-grade suffix reflected traditional climbing dangers (e.g. how good is the level of protection available to the traditional climber on the route), and not the dangers specific to the DWS climber (who was not going to be placing traditional climbing protection on the route); it is akin to the "R/X" suffix of American grades. For example, British climber Neil Gresham's 2012 DWS route Olympiad, has a DWS grade of F8b S1, but a traditional climbing English grade of E10 6c.

The four levels of S-grade, as described by Mike Robinson in Deep Water (2007), are as follows:

- S0: "Safe at most tides, not particularly high crux moves. Avoid bottling out of an S0 if possible. These are essentially safe, so climb until you fall. Commitment normally pays off!"
- S1: "Care required; either the tide or the water depth needs checking, or maybe there is a highish crux on the route. Remember that, in big-tide venues, a huge tide and good timing can turn an S1 into an S0".
- S2: "A little more care than S1 required. Possibly spring-tide only (higher water levels). Check your tide timetable. 'Landings' can be more significant – maybe a crash landing into shallow-ish water is required, or a slight 'push' to clear rock or a slight slab/reef below. Likely to have a high crux".
- S3: "Expect the water to be either too shallow or too far away! You can't really afford to fall off an S3 without a large measure of control or timing. Failure on the route might require a full body-length crash landing into the deepest water available, or a long and scary downward flight. If you're operating in a tidal venue, wait for the biggest high tide possible".

== Notable ascents and milestones ==
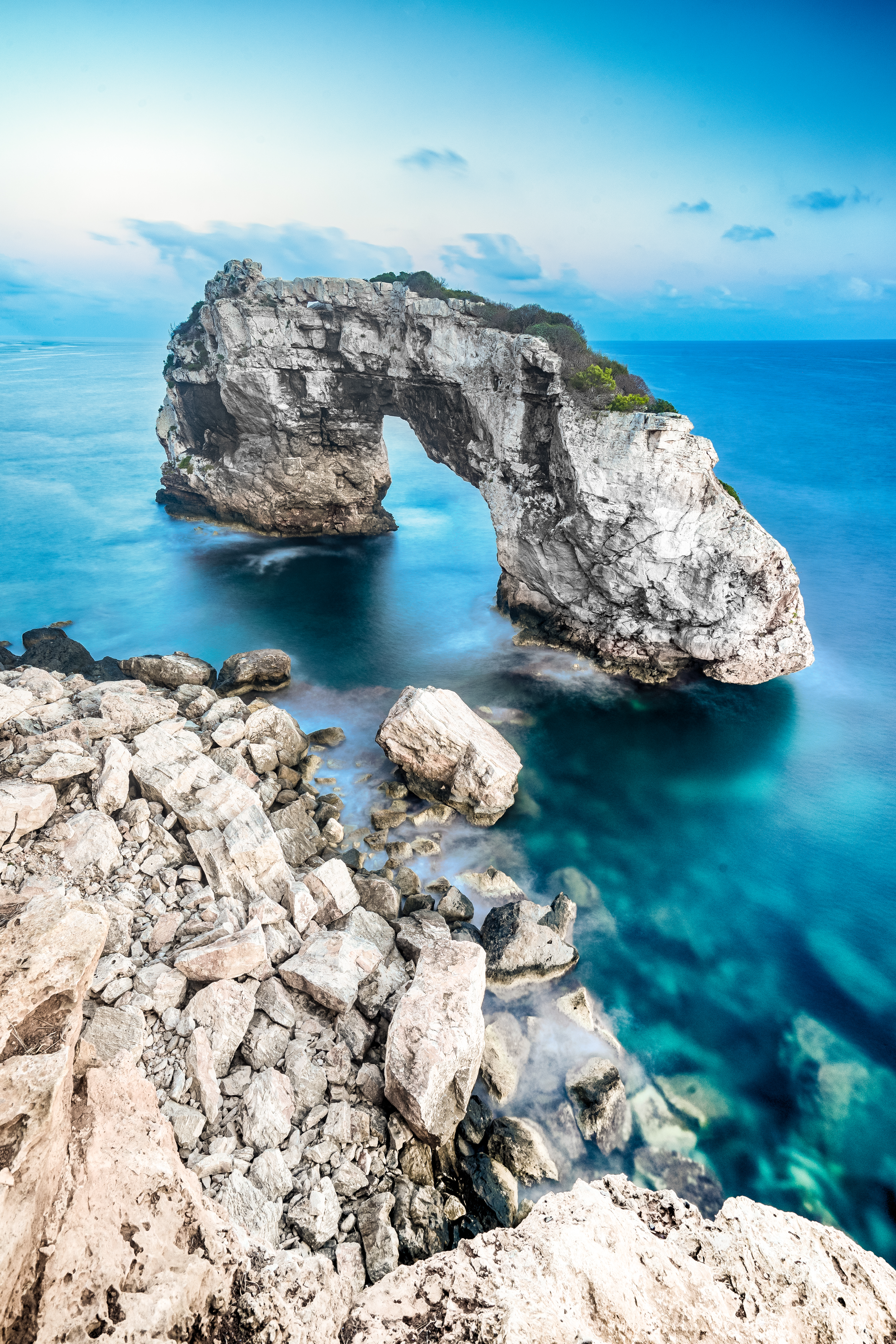
Es Pontàs 9a+ (5.15a), Spain

A number of DWS ascents are particularly notable in the sport:

- 2006: Es Pontàs 9a+ (5.15a), Mallorca (ESP). First ascent was by Chris Sharma who left it ungraded but needed fifty attempts on the 7-foot (2.1 m) dyno high up on the 15-metre (49 ft) sea arch; the DWS route of Es Pontàs launched DWS to a much wider global audience and its first ascent featured prominently in Sharma's iconic 2007 climbing film, King Lines. Was repeated by Jernej Kruder (2016), Jan Hojer (2018), Jakob Schubert (2021), and Mejdi Schalck (2024) with a consensus that the grade is circa 5.15 (being a high DWS brings additional complexity in grading), which was the first-ever in DWS.
- 2016: Alasha 9a (5.14d), Mallorca in Spain. First ascent was by Chris Sharma who left it ungraded and named it after his daughter; his descriptions led to media speculation that it was 9b (5.15b); Jakob Schubert and Jernej Kruder made repeats in 2021, and estimated that its grade to be circa 9a, which takes account of the fact that the crux is at an intimidating height of 15 metres (49 ft).
- 2017: The King 8b+ (5.14a), Pont d'Arc in France. First ascent by Chris Sharma; while not one of Sharma's hardest DWS routes, the great height of the arch (30 metres (98 ft) at the apex) and its natural beauty, attracted significant attention; the route is now named The King.
- 2018: Weatherman 8a+ (5.13c), Mallorca in Spain. Julia Kruder repeated Chris Sharma's route, and becomes the first female to climb a DWS route at the grade of 8a+.
- 2024: Poseidon's Kiss 8c (5.14b), Mallorca in Spain. Hannes Van Duysen becomes the first person to flash an 8c (5.14b) graded DWS route with his ascend of Philipp Geisenhoff's 2022 DWS route.

== In film ==
A number of notable films have been made focused on DWS free solo climbing including:

- King Lines, a 2007 documentary film about Chris Sharma, featuring his free solo climb of the DWS route, Es Pontàs 9a+ (5.15a), in Mallorca.
- Deep Water, a 2020 short documentary film featuring Tim Emmett and Kyra Condie soloing in Hạ Long Bay in Vietnam.
- Second season of No Limits, a 2026 National Geographic television series, features an episode with Chris Hemsworth soloing in Cala sa Nau.

== See also ==
- Free solo climbing
- Solo climbing
