= Es Pontàs (climb) =

Deep-water soloing route in Mallorca, Spain

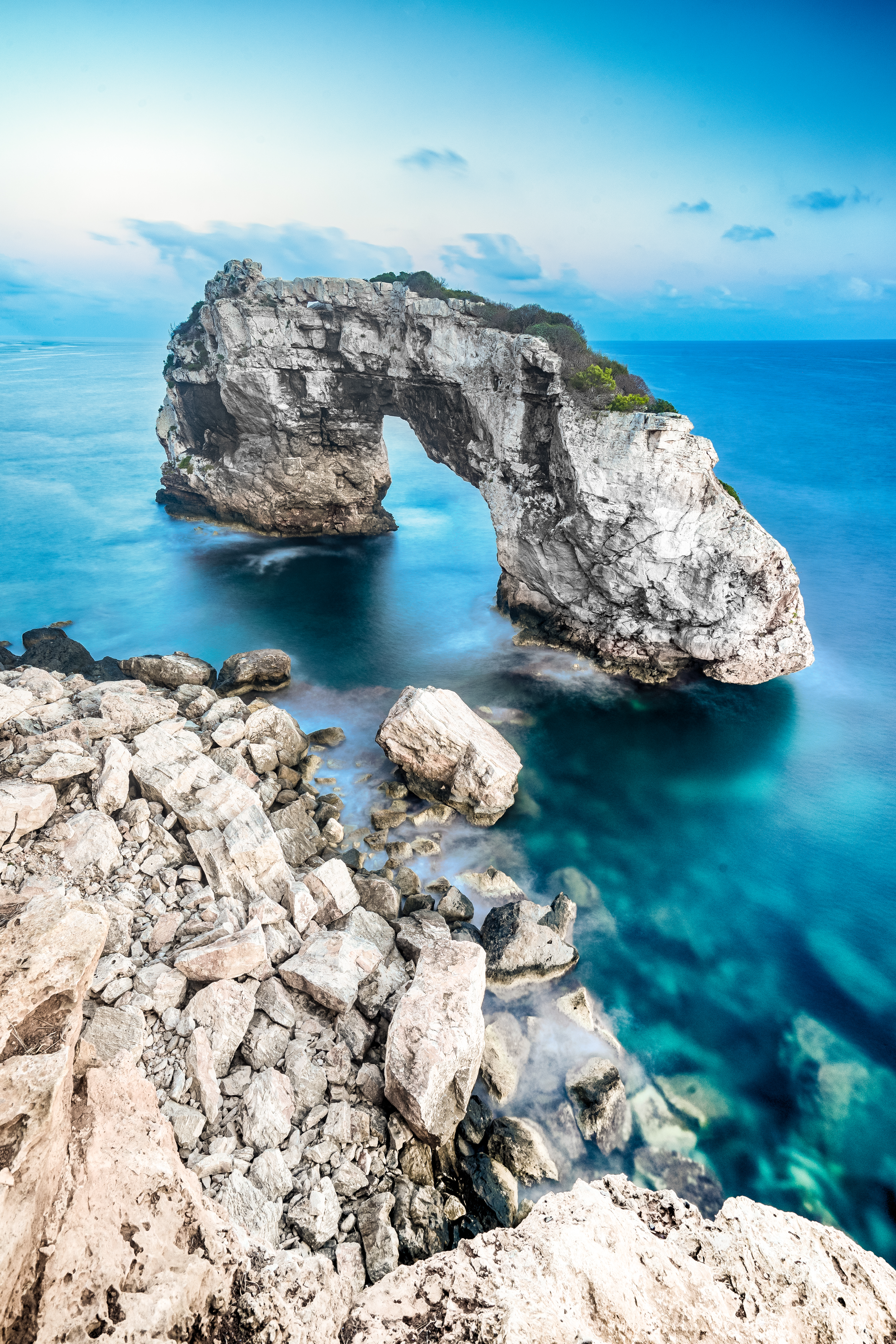
- The Es Pontàs sea arch in Mallorca; the climb goes along the inside right-hand side of the arch to its landward apex

- Location within Mallorca
- Location: Santanyí, Mallorca, Spain
- Coordinates: 39°19′32″N 3°08′41″E
- Climbing area: Es Pontàs
- Route type: Deep-water soloing
- Rock type: Limestone
- Vertical gain: 20 metres (66 ft) (length)
- Pitches: 1
- Technical grade: 5.15a (9a+)
- First free ascent: Chris Sharma, 26 September 2006
- Known for: First-ever DWS route at 9a+ (5.15a) in history

Es Pontàs is a 20-metre (66 ft) long limestone deep-water soloing (DWS) climbing route on the Es Pontàs sea-arch in Mallorca, Spain. After it was first free soloed in September 2006 by American climber Chris Sharma, it became graded at 9a+ (5.15a) – the world's first-ever DWS route at that grade, and one of the earliest 9a+ graded rock climbs of any type in history. Es Pontàs was credited with promoting the emerging sport of DWS, and further enhancing Sharma's reputation and legacy as a pioneer in rock climbing. Sharma's first ascent was featured in the award-winning 2007 climbing film, King Lines.

== History ==
In 2001, after making the first free ascent of Realization/Biographie, the world's first-ever consensus 9a+ (5.15a) sport climbing route, Chris Sharma considered quitting climbing and went on Buddhist pilgrimages. A 2003 trip to Mallorca in Spain to meet Miquel Riera, the pioneer of deep-water soloing, led him to "fall in love with climbing all over again". Sharma decided to largely abandon competition climbing to focus on finding "King Lines", a term he adopted for iconic routes that motivated him.

In 2004, Riera pointed out to Sharma a potential DWS "King Line" on the picturesque sea arch of Es Pontàs. It followed the arch from its base to the apex, was severely overhanging, and required committing dynos 35-feet above the water. In November 2005, Sharma completed the first ascent of Pontax, a variation of the line that took an easier seaward exit at the dyno and was graded 8c (5.14b). In September 2006, after almost 50 attempts and long falls into the water, Sharma stuck the crux 7-foot dyno to complete the line of Es Pontàs. Sharma did not grade the route but said its difficulties were similar to Realization. This made Es Pontàs the world's first-ever 5.15a (9a+) DWS route, and alongside Realization and La Rambla, one of only a handful of climbing routes of any type at that grade.

It was not until November 2016 that Slovenian climber Jernej Kruder made the first repeat of Es Pontàs (and also Pontax). Kruder spent over a month attempting it with German climber Jan Hojer and said: "For sure it's about 9th grade", and that DWS was a "mind battle". In October 2018, Hojer returned and made the third ascent, saying that it was one of the best experiences in his climbing career, and that the grade was at 9a+ (5.15a). In October 2021, Austrian climber Jakob Schubert made the fourth ascent, and did other DWS routes in Mallorca. Schubert felt that Sharma's 2016 DWS route, Alasha, was at the grade of about 9a (5.14d), and that Es Pontàs was harder. As with Hojer and Kruder, he felt that it was a unique experience and that it was important to adjust to the mental aspect of DWS.

== Route ==
Es Pontàs (and Pontax) starts at the base of the right pillar on a little ledge just 2 metres above the water line. The first obstacle is getting over a 7C+ (V10) small roof, to reach an overhanging face and better holds. A series of moves on small pinches and pockets leads to a "barrel of the gun" shaped feature.

At this stage, a 7-foot dynamic lunge from two undercuts gets to a large but hard-to-stick pocket hold. Hojer noted that Kruder and himself found that even after succeeding on the dyno, it was a "surprisingly low percentage" dyno, saying: "At first I thought that once I stuck it I'd stick it every go or every other go afterward. But Jernej and I would stick it two out of four times one day, and then none the next time".

After the dyno, Pontax exits via the easier seaward side, whereas Es Pontàs moves rightwards on tiny edges to a more difficult arete on the landward side of the arch. This traverse is considered one of the most technically difficult parts of the route. Small sloping holds on the arete lead to the apex of the arch, with a final powerful direct ascent to the top.

== Legacy ==
Sharma's first ascent of Es Pontàs featured prominently in the award-winning 2007 climbing film, King Lines, which became an iconic film in rock climbing. In 2016, Michael Leavy in Rock & Ice labelled the photos of Sharma hanging off of Es Pontas an "indelible image for climbers of the mid-2000s". In a 2016 interview with Climbing, DWS pioneer Miquel Riera called Sharma's ascent of Es Pontas the most impressive ascent in DWS.

Sharma called his ascent: "a pivotal experience in my life that set me on an entirely new path in my life and in the world". He also described DWS as "the perfect form of climbing", and that free soloing a 5.15 graded route was "as good as it gets". Climbing said his ascent was another example of Sharma's "genius to see the potential, coupled with the commitment to spend months and years of his life proving it". Climbing also noted that the ascent, and increased profile Sharma brought to DWS, were examples of his influence on the development of the sport of modern rock climbing, saying: "Sharma shaped modern rock climbing. Whatever he thought was cool, we followed. Bouldering. Projecting hard sport routes. Deep water soloing".

== Ascents ==
Es Pontàs has been ascended by:

- 1st. Chris Sharma on 26 September 2006.
- 2nd. Jernej Kruder in November 2016.
- 3rd. Jan Hojer in October 2018.
- 4th. Jakob Schubert in October 2021.
- 5th. Léo Favot on 5 October 2024.
- 6th. Hannes Van Duysen in October 2024.
- 7th. Mejdi Schalck in October 2024.
- 8th. Samuel Richard in October 2025.
- 9th. Darius Rapa in October 2025.
- 10th. Michael Piccolruaz in October 2025.

Pontax has been ascended by:

- 1st. Chris Sharma in 2005.
- 2nd. Jernej Kruder in October 2016.

== Filmography ==
- Sharma's 2007 ascent of Es Pontas: Mortimer, Peter (director) (2007). King Lines (Motion picture). Sender Films. ASIN B000XW1NV0.

== See also ==
- History of rock climbing
- List of grade milestones in rock climbing
- Silence, first climb in the world with a potential grade of 9c (5.15d)
- La Dura Dura, second climb in the world with a consensus grade of 9b+ (5.15c)
- Jumbo Love, first climb in the world with a consensus grade of 9b (5.15b)
- Realization/Biographie, first climb in the world with a consensus grade of 9a+ (5.15a)
- Action Directe, first climb in the world with a consensus grade of 9a (5.14d)
- Hubble, first climb in the world with a consensus grade of 8c+ (5.14c)
