= Jan Hojer =

German rock climber (born 1992)

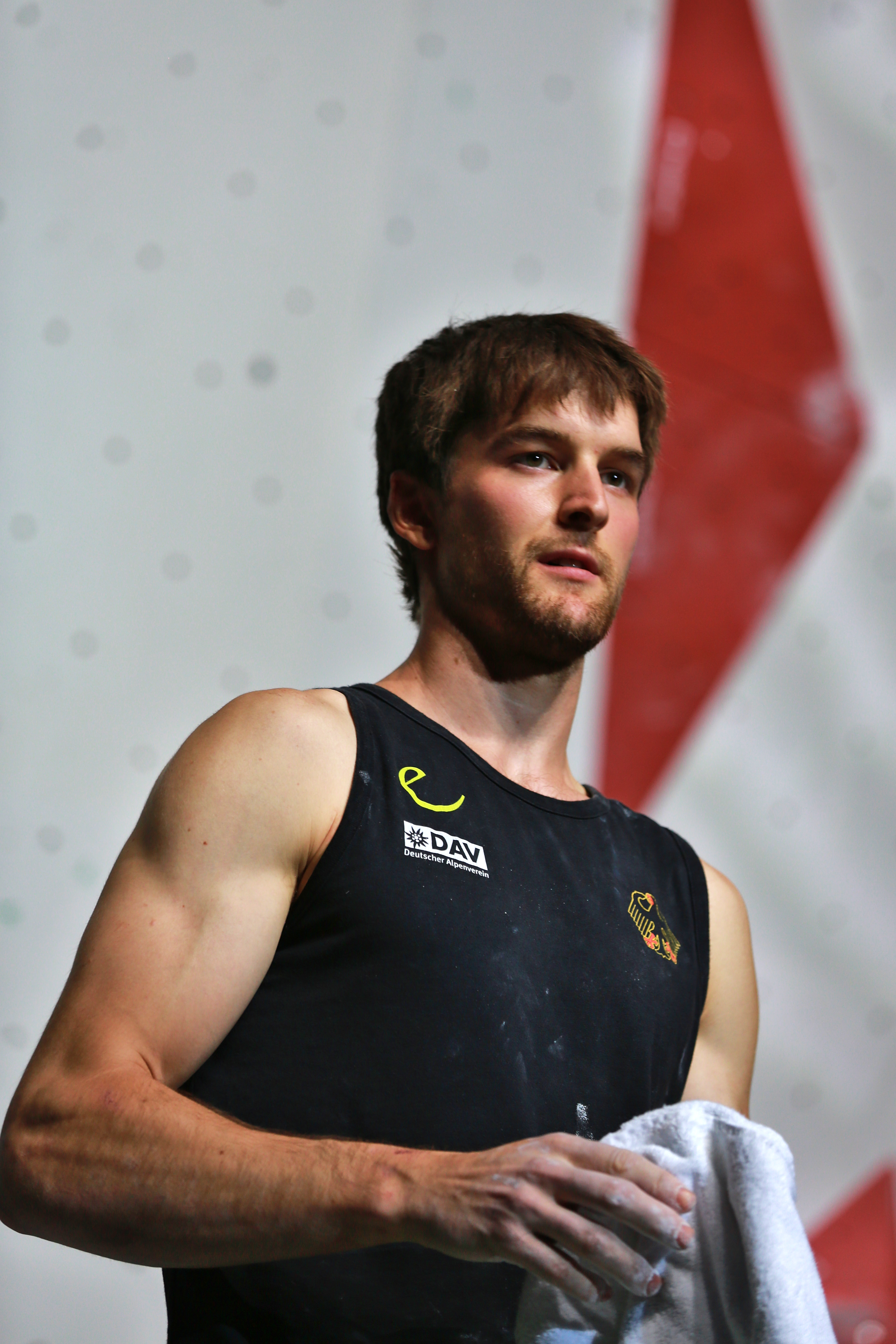
- Hojer in 2018

Personal information
- Nationality: German
- Born: February 9, 1992 (age 34) Cologne, Germany
- Occupation: Professional rock climber
- Height: 188 cm (6 ft 2 in)
- Weight: 77 kg (170 lb)

Climbing career
- Type of climber: Bouldering; Sport climbing; Competition climbing
- Ape index: +10 cm (4 in)
- Highest grade: Redpoint: 9a (5.14d); Bouldering: 8C (V15)
- Known for: Winning one World Cup and two European Championships
Medal record
Men's competition climbing
Representing Germany
World Championships
Silver medal – second place	2014 Munich/Gijón	Combined
Bronze medal – third place	2014 Munich	Bouldering
Bronze medal – third place	2018 Innsbruck	Combined
World Cup
Winner	2014	Bouldering
Second place	2015	Bouldering
European Championships
Gold medal – first place	2015	Bouldering
Gold medal – first place	2017	Bouldering
Gold medal – first place	2017	Combined
The World Games
Silver medal – second place	2017	Bouldering
- Updated on 21 September 2018

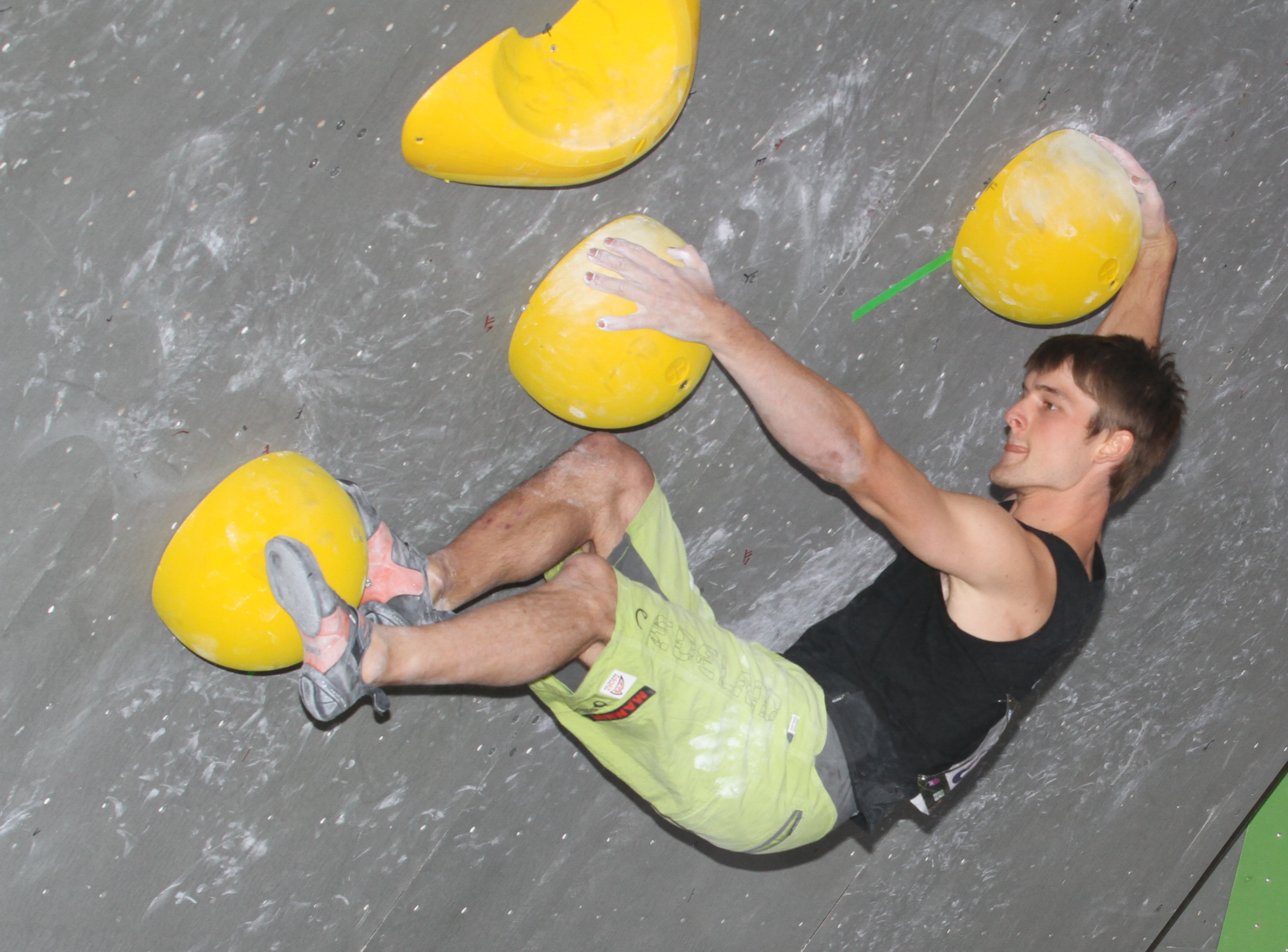
Hojer competing at the World Cup, Munich, 2015

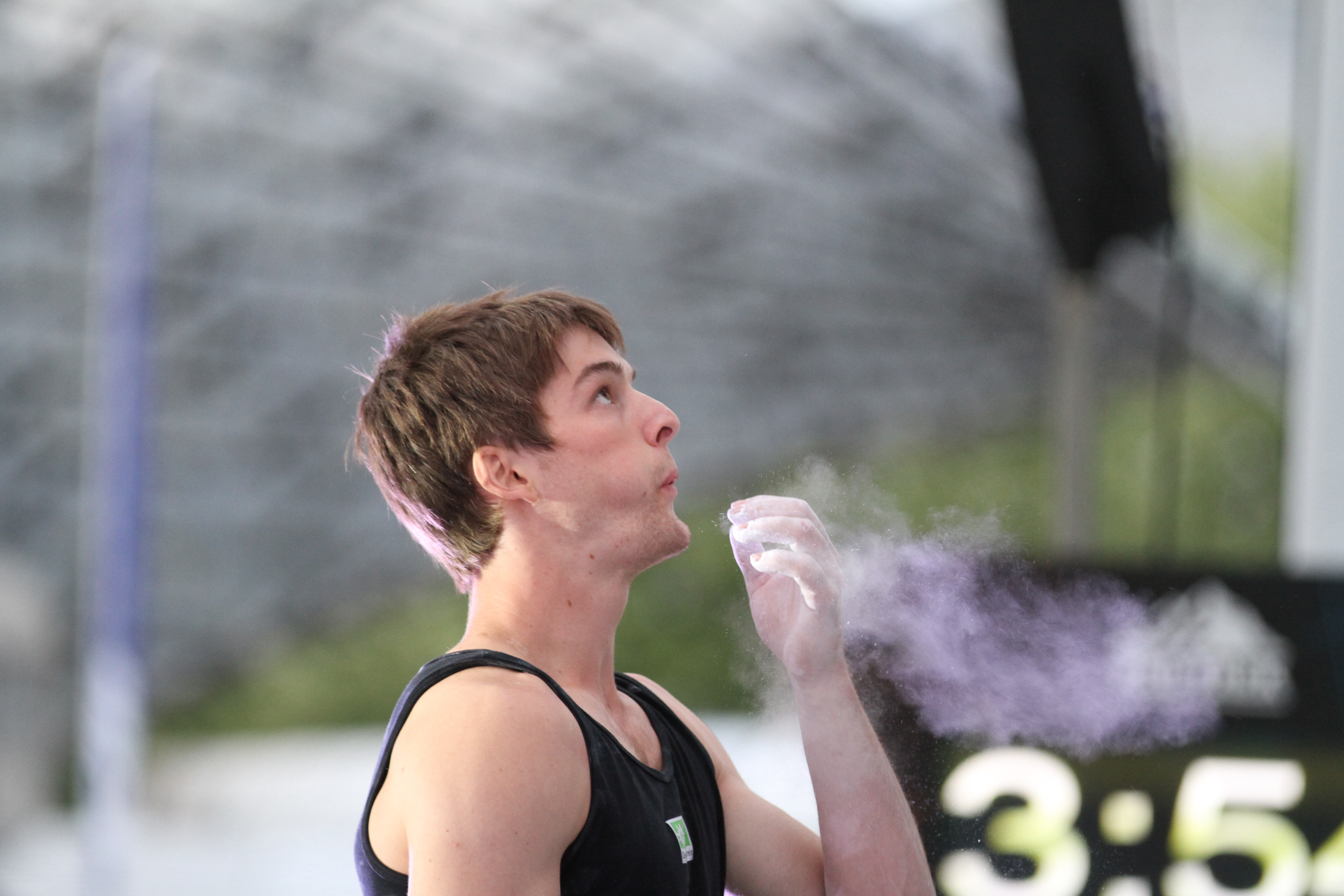
Hojer, 2015

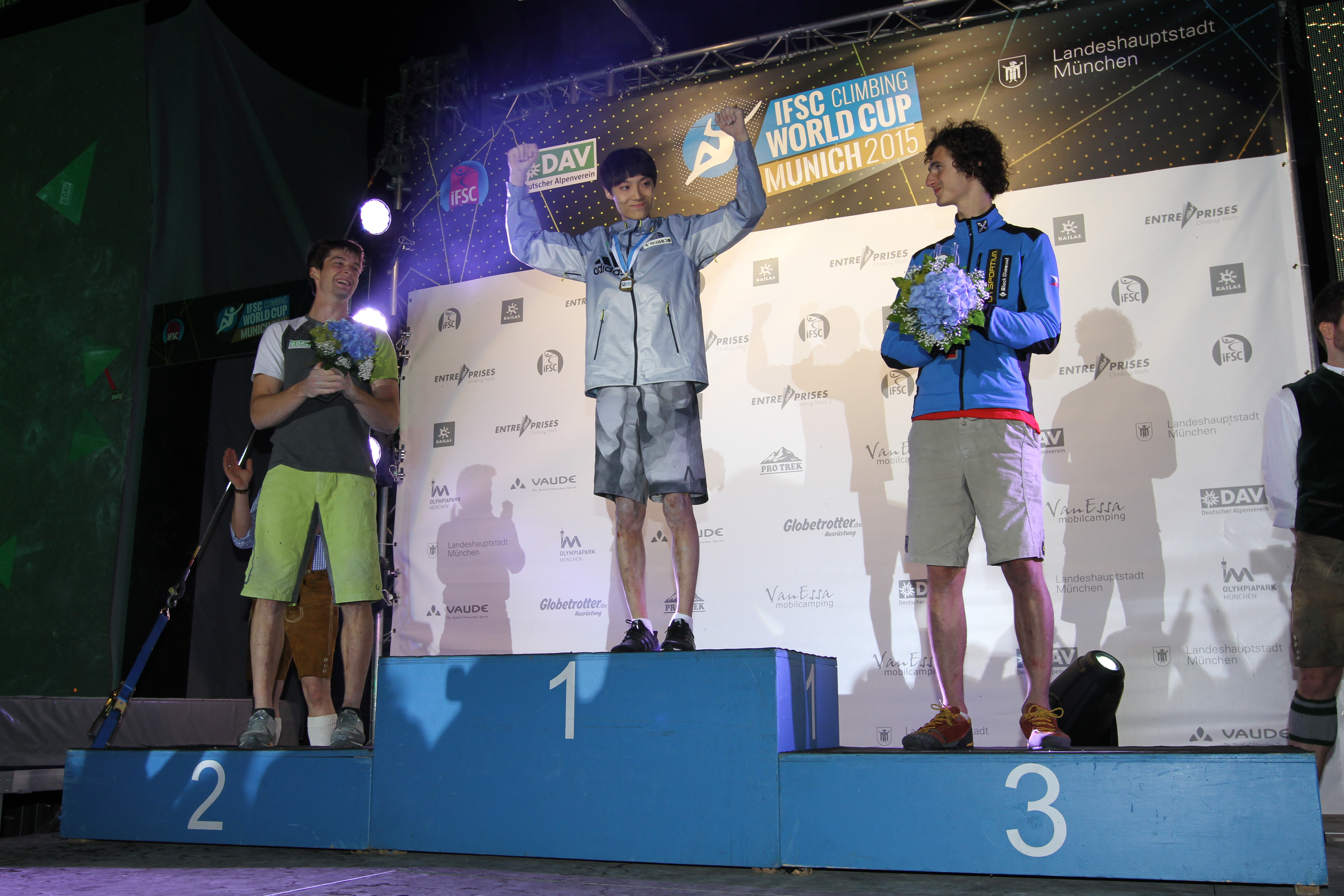
Hojer second at the World Cup 2015

Jan Hojer (born February 9, 1992) is a German professional rock climber specializing in sport climbing, bouldering, and competition climbing. He is known for winning one World Cup and two European Championships in competition bouldering. In May 2010, he climbed Action Directe, one of the most difficult sport climbing routes in the world. From 2013 to 2015, he sent several 8C (V15) boulder problems.

== Climbing career ==
=== Competition climbing ===
Hojer started participating in German Lead climbing youth competitions in 2004, at the age of 10. From 2008 to 2010 he participated in the Lead Climbing World Cup. Since his performances in lead climbing were never outstanding, he quit competing in that discipline in 2011 and started competing in bouldering. Notable results started coming next year, when he ranked fifth in the Climbing World Championships. He won the seasonal title of the Bouldering Climbing World Cup in 2014 and finished second in 2015.

In 2015 and 2017 he won the Climbing European Championships in Bouldering. Also in 2017, he won the silver medal at the Bouldering World Games in Wrocław, Poland.

Hojer has won national championships in all climbing disciplines. He won the lead in 2008, 2017, and 2019. In bouldering he won in 2011, 2014, 2015, and 2016, finished second in 2017, and has not competed since. Hojer won the first German National Championship in the combined format in 2018, and in 2019 he won the only discipline that he hadn't won yet, speed.

In 2019 Hojer qualified for the 2020 Summer Olympics through his performance at the IFSC Combined Qualifier event in Toulouse. Hojer finished 12th out of 20 at the Tokyo Olympics.

=== Rock climbing ===
He also obtained outstanding results in outdoor climbing. In May 2010, he redpointed the sport climbing route, Action Directe. From 2013 to 2015, he sent several outdoor bouldering problems at the grade of 8C (V15). In 2018, he made the third ascent of the deep-water soloing route, Es Pontàs at 9a+ (5.15a).

== Results ==
=== Climbing World Cup ===
Discipline	2008	2009	2010	2011	2012	2013	2014	2015	2016	2017
Lead	22	22	43	-	-	-	-	33	-	17
Bouldering	-	-	-	33	20	8	1	2	9	7
Speed	-	-	-	-	-	-	-	-	-	29
Combined	-	-	-	-	-	-	-	5	-	7

=== Climbing World Championships ===
Discipline	2009	2011	2012	2014	2016	2018
Lead	30	-	-	30	-	29
Bouldering	39	46	5	3	27	9
Speed	-	-	-	30	-	33
Combined	-	-	-	2	-	3

=== Climbing European Championships ===
Discipline	2010	2013	2015	2017
Lead	41	-	-	21
Bouldering	-	20	1	1
Speed	-	-	-	23
Combined	-	-	-	1

== Number of medals in the Climbing World Cup ==
=== Bouldering ===
Season	Gold	Silver	Bronze	Total
2012			1	1
2013	1	1		2
2014	3	2		5
2015	1			1
2016		1		1
2017	1			1
2018				0
2019			1	1
Total	6	4	2	12

== Rock climbing ==
=== Redpointed routes ===
9a+ (5.15a):

- Es Pontàs - Mallorca (ESP) - October, 2018

9a (5.14d):

- Action Directe - Frankenjura (DEU)- May 22, 2010

8c+ (5.14c):

- Pati noso - Siurana (ESP) - April 27, 2011
- Bah Bah Black Sheep - Céüse (FRA) - July 22, 2010

=== Boulder problems ===
8C (V15):

- Quoi de Neuf - Fontainebleau (FRA) - November 21, 2017
- From Dirt Grows the Flowers - Chironico (CHE) - March 8, 2015
- The Story of Two Worlds - Cresciano (CHE) - April 11, 2014
- Le Marathon de Boissy - Fontainebleau (FRA) - March 2014 - First ascent.
- Trip Hop - Fontainebleau (FRA) - October 2013
- The Big Island - Fontainebleau (FRA) - January 2013.

8B+ (V14):

- Jour de Chasse - Fontainebleau (FRA) - December 2013 - First ascent. Hojer graded it a soft 8C, possibly because he did not use a heel hook that, according to some repeaters, makes it easier to climb.
- Dreamtime - Cresciano (CHE) - February 18, 2013. Rated 8C by Hojer, who described it as "much harder than any 8B+ i've ever tried.."
