= Monika Retschy =

Retired german competition climber

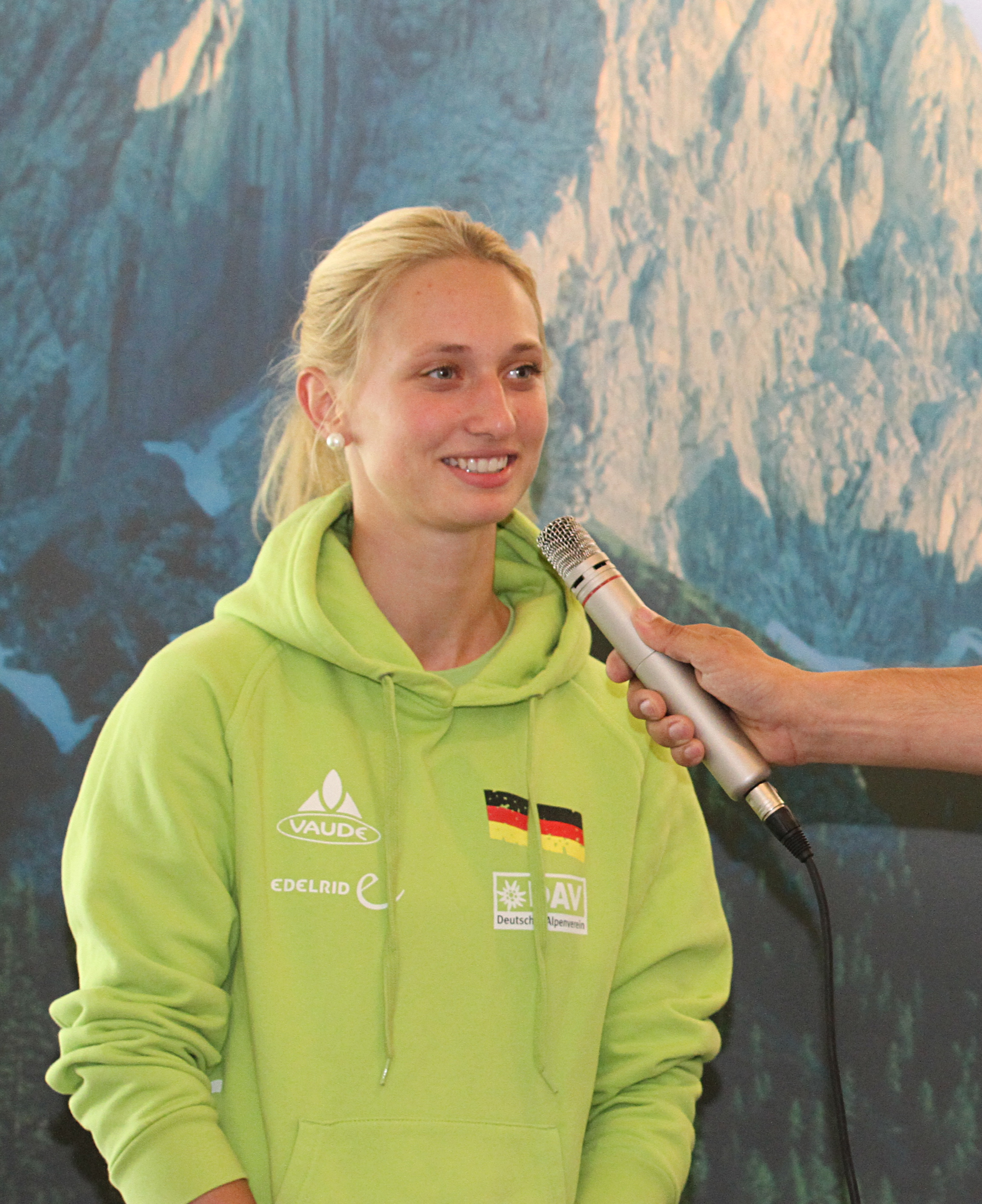
- Retschy in 2012

Personal information
- Born: December 5, 1991 (age 34) Munich, Germany
- Occupations: Professional climber, athletic trainer

Climbing career
- Type of climber: Bouldering; Competition climbing
- Highest grade: Bouldering: 8A (V11)

Monika Retschy (December 5, 1991 in Munich) is a retired German competition climber, who specializes in competition bouldering. In 2013, she won the German Championship for the sport.

== Climbing career ==
=== Competition climbing ===
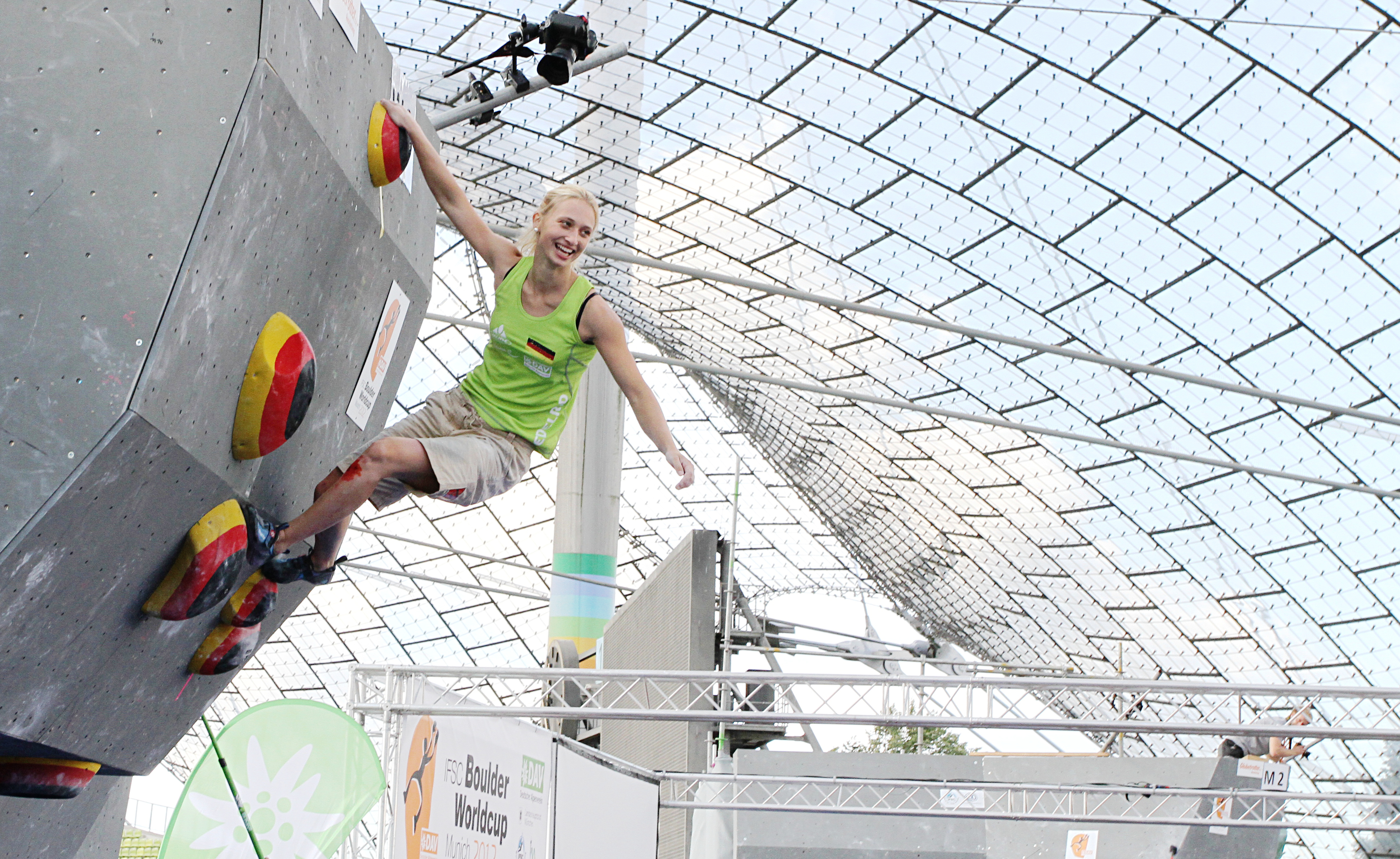
Retschy competing in 2012

Retschy began climbing in indoor climbing walls when she was between eleven and twelve years old. She first decided to specialize in bouldering when she was sixteen. She was a founding member of Munich's Alpine Club competition climbing team in 2004, and was selected to the Bavarian squad in 2006.

In her first year of adult competition climbing in 2007, she finished 8th in the Munich National Championships. In 2009, 2011 and 2012 she was the German runner up. In 2010, she participated in the IFSC Climbing World Cup for the first time. From 2012 to 2017 she climbed for the German national team, taking part in all World Cup competitions.

In 2013, she won the German National Championships. That year, she reached fourth place in the 2013 European Bouldering Championships. She finished the 2013 World Cup season in 11th place internationally. That year, she featured in "Gimme Kraft!" a climbing documentary filmed in Café Kraft, Bavaria. In 2014, she finished in 7th place in bouldering at the IFSC Climbing World Championships, and that year again placed 11th in the world rankings.

During the 2015 season, she placed 14th in the overall world rankings for bouldering. That season, she placed eighth at the competition in Vail, 27th in Toronto, 4th at the European Championships in Innsbruck.

In 2016, she placed sixth at the IFSC Climbing World Cup in Chongqing, and then took second at the World Cup stage in Navi Mumbai, placing her fifth in the world rankings. That year, she became the German Bouldering champion for the second time and placed 20th at the World Climbing Championships in Paris. In June 2017, she became the German bouldering champion for the third time, after defending her 2016 title.

In July at the Wroclaw World Games, she placed fourth in the women's competition bouldering event. The next month, in August 2017 she announced her retirement from competitive sport at the Bouldering World Cup, after placing 31st. Retschy had been open about her intention to retire from competitive sport, as earning money from bouldering caused too much stress and pressure to perform.

=== Climbing trainer ===
Retschy studied sports science and was a trainer for the German Alpine Club's junior climbers in Munich. In March 2021, she is a trainer for the German Alpine Club in Kaiserslautern, Rhineland Palatinate.
