= Mélissa Le Nevé =

French rock climber (born 1989)

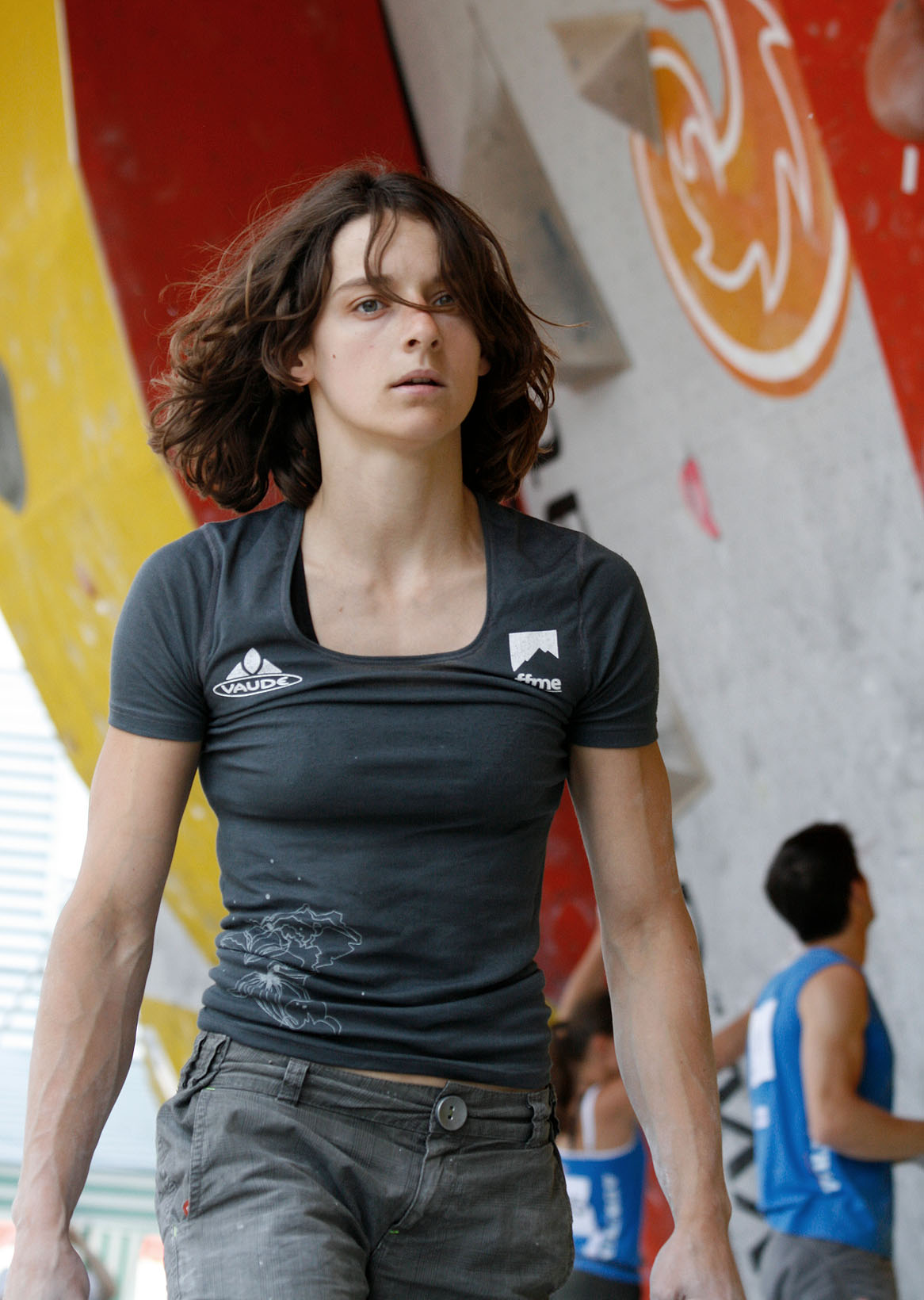
- ISFC Boulder World Cup, Vienne, 2010

Personal information
- Nationality: French
- Born: 8 July 1989 (age 37)
- Occupation: Professional rock climber
- Height: 169 cm (5 ft 7 in)
- Weight: 50 kg (110 lb)

Climbing career
- Type of climber: Competition climbing; Sport climbing; Bouldering
- Highest grade: Redpoint: 9a (5.14d); Onsight/Flash: 8a+ (5.13c); Bouldering: 8B+ (V14)
- Retired from competition: 2016 (competition)
- Known for: First female free ascent of Action Directe 9a (5.14d)
Medal record
Women's competition climbing
Representing France
IFSC Climbing World Cup
Bronze medal – third place	2016	Bouldering
- Updated on 20 January 2022

Mélissa Le Nevé (born July 8, 1989) is a French professional rock climber specializing in competition bouldering, but and also in outdoor sport climbing and bouldering.

== Early life ==
Le Nevé grew up in the Vosges until she was 10, and later began climbing at age 15, at a gym near Bordeaux.

== Climbing career ==
=== Competition climbing ===
Le Nevé focused her competition climbing career on the discipline of bouldering. Le Nevé was the French women's bouldering champion in 2010 and 2013, placed fourth in the 2011 IFSC Bouldering World Cup overall standings, and placed 2nd at individual IFSC World Cup events in Slovenia (2013), Switzerland (2016), and Japan (2016). She retired from competitive climbing in 2016, after finishing third in that year's IFSC Bouldering World Cup.

=== Rock climbing ===
In 2015, she became the first woman to climb a set of boulders in Fontainebleau called the "Big Five", one of which–Atrésie–is rated 8A (V11). In December 2016, she climbed an 8B (V13) boulder in Fontainebleau, La Cicatrice de L'Ohm. In 2017, she climbed the 8B+ (V14) problem, Mécanique élémentaire, at Fontainebleau.

Le Nevé has also climbed some of the hardest outdoor sport climbing routes. In 2014, she made the first female free ascent (FFFA) of Wallstreet, an 8c (5.14b) sport climbing route in the Frankenjura. In April 2020, she made the first free female ascent of Wolfgang Güllich's iconic route Action Directe (XI, 9a) in Frankenjura.

== Personal life ==
She lives in Fontainebleau.

== Filmography ==
- Petzl Roctrip Mexico 2010: Call, Mike (director), Broust, Guillaume (director) (2010). MNTNFilm (Motion picture). Petzl.
- The Fanatic Search 2 - A Girl Thing: Triay, Laurent (director) (2011). MNTNFilm (Motion picture). Work Less Climb More.
- Petzl Roctrip China 2011: Cellier, Vladmir (director) (2011). MNTNFilm (Motion picture). Petzl, Baraka Films.
- Vivid Landscapes: Souirji, Haroun (director) (2012). MNTNFilm (Motion picture). HS Productions.
- Petzl Roctrip Argentina 2012: Cellier, Vladmir (director), Broust, Guillaume (director) (2012). MNTNFilm (Motion picture). Petzl, Baraka Films.
- Rockin' Cuba: Cellier, Vladmir (director) (2013). MNTNFilm (Motion picture). Baraka Films.
- Gimme Kraft!: Huch, Hannes (director) (2013). MNTNFilm (Motion picture). Café Kraft, Lowcut.
- The Warm Heart of Africa: Bouldering in Malawi: Souirji, Haroun (director) (2014). MNTNFilm (Motion picture). Vast Motion Pictures.
- Pad Party: Ladzinski, Keith (director) (2014). MNTNFilm (Motion picture). Petzl, 3 Strings Productions.
- Paris la nuit: Perotti, Clément (director) (2014). MNTNFilm (Motion picture). FODACIM, Adidas, Sandstones Media Production.
- Petzl Roctrip 2014 - On the road: Steinberg, Rémi (director), Routin, Mylène (director), Broust, Guillaume (director) (2014). MNTNFilm (Motion picture). MedeO Productions, Petzl.
- Le Nevé's 2020 ascent of Action Directe: Lowell, Josh (director), Mortimer, Peter (director) (2020). ReelRock 15 (Motion picture). Sender Films.
- Swissway to Heaven: Broust, Guillaume (director) (2022). Guillaume Broust Swissway to Heaven – Cédric Lachat (Motion picture). Petzl.
