= Lead climbing at the 2017 IFSC Climbing World Cup =

- Location: Villars, Switzerland Chamonix, France; Briançon, France; Arco, Italy; Edinburgh, United Kingdom; Wujiang, China; Xiamen, China Kranj, Slovenia
- Dates: 7 July – 12 November 2017

Champions
- Men: (France) Romain Desgranges
- Women: (Slovenia) Janja Garnbret

Lead climbing competitions at the 2017 IFSC Climbing World Cup were held at eight stops. The winners were awarded trophies, and the best three finishers received medals. At the end of the season an overall ranking was determined based upon points, which athletes were awarded for finishing in the top 30 of each individual event. Romain Desgranges won the men's seasonal title, Janja Garnbret won the women's seasonal title, and Slovenia won the national team title.

== Overall Ranking ==
An overall ranking was determined based upon points, which athletes were awarded for finishing in the top 30 of each individual event.

=== Men ===
7 best competition results were counted (not counting points in brackets) for IFSC Climbing Worldcup 2017. Romain Desgranges won.

Rank	Name	Points	Kranj	Xiamen	Wujiang	Edinburgh	Arco	Briançon	Chamonix	Villars
1	(France) Romain Desgranges	477	9. 37.00	22. (9.00)	5. 51.00	1. 100.00	10. 34.00	1. 100.00	4. 55.00	1. 100.00
2	(Italy) Stefano Ghisolfi	413	5. 51.00	7. 43.00	1. 100.00	2. 80.00	18. (16.00)	3. 65.00	7. 43.00	11. 31.00
3	(Japan) Keiichiro Korenaga	373	10. (32.00)	1. 100.00	8. 40.00	10. 34.00	5. 51.00	10. 34.00	2. 80.00	10. 34.00
4	(Slovenia) Domen Škofic	325	4. 55.00	17. 18.00	4. 55.00	4. 55.00	21. (10.00)	9. 37.00	13. 25.00	2. 80.00
5	(Italy) Marcello Bombardi	289	7. 43.00	23. (8.00)	17. 18.00	12. 28.00	9. 37.00	6. 47.00	1. 100.00	18. 16.00
6	(Austria) Jakob Schubert	265	1. 100.00	-	-	3. 65.00	1. 100.00	-	-	-
7	(France) Thomas Joannes	221	12. 28.00	9. 37.00	16. 20.00	5. 51.00	6. 47.00	19. 14.00	27. (2.00)	14. 24.00
8	(South Korea) Hanwool Kim	213	14. 24.00	10. 34.00	3. 65.00	13. 26.00	15. 22.00	13. 26.00	16. 16.00	29. (2.00)
9	(Ukraine) Fedir Samoilov	193	15. 22.00	5. 51.00	25. 6.00	9. 37.00	24. 7.00	-	26. 5.00	3. 65.00
10	(Italy) Francesco Vettorata	182	6. 47.00	14. 24.00	14. 24.00	-	16. 19.00	14. 24.00	9. 35.00	22. 9.00

=== Women ===
7 best competition results were counted (not counting points in brackets) for IFSC Climbing Worldcup 2017. Janja Garnbret won.

Rank	Name	Points	Kranj	Xiamen	Wujiang	Edinburgh	Arco	Briançon	Chamonix	Villars
1	(Slovenia) Janja Garnbret	665	1. 100.00	3. 65.00	1. 100.00	1. 100.00	3. (65.00)	1. 100.00	1. 100.00	1. 100.00
2	(South Korea) Jain Kim	525	2. 80.00	8. (38.00)	2. 80.00	3. 65.00	1. 100.00	3. 65.00	2. 80.00	4. 55.00
3	(Belgium) Anak Verhoeven	444	8. 40.00	1. 100.00	8. (40.00)	6. 47.00	6. 47.00	2. 80.00	3. 65.00	3. 65.00
4	(Austria) Jessica Pilz	374	-	4. 55.00	7. 43.00	2. 80.00	7. 43.00	5. 51.00	5. 51.00	5. 51.00
5	(France) Julia Chanourdie	362	4. 55.00	11. (28.00)	3. 65.00	5. 51.00	4. 55.00	4. 55.00	6. 47.00	10. 34.00
6	(Slovenia) Mina Markovič	304	5. 51.00	5. 51.00	10. 34.00	15. 22.00	21. (10.00)	8. 40.00	13. 26.00	2. 80.00
7	(United Kingdom) Molly Thompson-Smith	267	3. 65.00	6. 45.00	5. 51.00	9. 35.00	8. 40.00	11. 31.00	-	-
8	(United States) Ashima Shiraishi	233	-	2. 80.00	6. 47.00	4. 55.00	5. 51.00	-	-	-
9	(Switzerland) Anne-Sophie Koller	210	11. 31.00	-	-	18. 16.00	2. 80.00	22. 9.00	9. 37.00	9. 37.00
10	(Austria) Hannah Schubert	204	16. 20.00	8. 38.00	13. 26.00	9. 35.00	19. 14.00	19. (14.00)	12. 28.00	7. 43.00

=== National Teams ===
For National Team Ranking, 3 best results per competition and category were counted (not counting results in brackets). Slovenia won.

Rank	Nation	Points	Kranj	Xiamen	Wujiang	Edinburgh	Arco	Briançon	Chamonix	Villars
1	Slovenia	1473	273	134	189	201	(86)	197	196	283
2	France	1440	132	(124)	195	248	180	280	173	232
3	(Japan)	1418	169	334	261	(97)	166	172	198	118
4	Austria	1070	144	127	(91)	242	224	125	95	113
5	Italy	1022	148	(95)	160	154	115	139	193	113
6	(South Korea) Republic of Korea	895	113	164	205	97	124	96	96	(57)
7	Belgium	642	88	106	(41)	70	49	110	116	103
8	United States	628	-	81	52	149	124	126	56	40
9	(Germany)	576	136	(35)	85	37	66	59	69	124
10	(United Kingdom) Great Britain	432	112	45	51	104	69	51	-	-

== Villars, Switzerland (7-8 July) ==
=== Men ===
77 athletes attended the World Cup in Villars.

Rank	Name	Score	Points
1	(France) Romain Desgranges	41	100
2	(Slovenia) Domen Škofic	37	80
3	(Ukraine) Fedir Samoilov	35+	65
4	(Germany) Jan Hojer	35+	55
5	(Japan) Yuki Hada	35	51
6	(Germany) Christoph Hanke	34	47
7	(Netherlands) Jorg Verhoeven	33+	43
8	(United States) Sean Bailey	32	40

=== Women ===
58 athletes attended the World Cup in Villars.

Rank	Name	Score	Points
1	(Slovenia) Janja Garnbret	Top	100
2	(Slovenia) Mina Markovič	42+	80
3	(Belgium) Anak Verhoeven	37+	65
4	(South Korea) Jain Kim	33+	55
5	(Austria) Jessica Pilz	33+	51
6	(Italy) Laura Rogora	31	47
7	(Austria) Hannah Schubert	28+	43
8	(France) Mathilde Becerra	12+	40

== Chamonix, France (12-13 July) ==
=== Men ===
83 athletes attended the World Cup in Chamonix.

Rank	Name	Score	Points
1	(Italy) Marcello Bombardi	Top	100
2	(Japan) Keiichiro Korenaga	Top	80
3	(Japan) Yuki Hada	Top	65
4	(France) Romain Desgranges	Top	55
5	(Belgium) Loïc Timmermans	42+	51
6	(Canada) Sean McColl	42	47
7	(Italy) Stefano Ghisolfi	40+	43
8	(Israel) Yuval Shemla	35+	40

=== Women ===
63 athletes attended the World Cup in Chamonix.

Rank	Name	Score	Points
1	(Slovenia) Janja Garnbret	Top	100
2	(South Korea) Jain Kim	Top	80
3	(Belgium) Anak Verhoeven	Top	65
4	(Norway) Tina Johnsen Hafsaas	37+	55
5	(Austria) Jessica Pilz	37	51
6	(France) Julia Chanourdie	33+	47
7	(Slovenia) Mia Krampl	32.5	43
8	(Ukraine) Ievgeniia Kazbekova	30	40

== Briançon, France (28-29 July) ==
=== Men ===
68 athletes attended the World Cup in Briançon.

Rank	Name	Score	Points
1	(France) Romain Desgranges	41	100
2	(Canada) Sean McColl	39	80
3	(Italy) Stefano Ghisolfi	35	65
4	(Japan) Masahiro Higuchi	29	55
5	(United States) Sean Bailey	28+	51
6	(Italy) Marcello Bombardi	27	47
7	(Japan) Naoki Shimatani	22.5	43
8	(Germany) Sebastian Halenke	13+	40

=== Women ===
58 athletes attended the World Cup in Briançon.

Rank	Name	Score	Points
1	(Slovenia) Janja Garnbret	39+	100
2	(Belgium) Anak Verhoeven	38+	80
3	(South Korea) Jain Kim	36+	65
4	(France) Julia Chanourdie	30+	55
5	(Austria) Jessica Pilz	26+	51
6	(United States) Margo Hayes	26+	47
7	(France) Salomé Romain	26+	43
8	(Slovenia) Mina Markovič	20+	40

== Arco, Italy (25-26 August) ==
=== Men ===
85 athletes attended the World Cup in Arco.

Rank	Name	Score	Points
1	(Austria) Jakob Schubert	39	100
2	(Czech Republic) Adam Ondra	38+	80
3	(Austria) Max Rudigier	38+	65
4	(Japan) Yoshiyuki Ogata	34+	55
5	(Japan) Keiichiro Korenaga	33+	51
6	(France) Thomas Joannes	26+	47
7	(Sweden) Hannes Puman	26	43
8	(Germany) Alexander Megos	11+	40

=== Women ===
72 athletes attended the World Cup in Arco.

Rank	Name	Score	Points
1	(South Korea) Jain Kim	38	100
2	(Switzerland) Anne-Sophie Koller	38	80
3	(Slovenia) Janja Garnbret	32+	65
4	(France) Julia Chanourdie	32+	55
5	(United States) Ashima Shiraishi	32+	51
6	(Belgium) Anak Verhoeven	31+	47
7	(Austria) Jessica Pilz	31+	43
8	(United Kingdom) Molly Thompson-Smith	20+	40

== Edinburgh, United Kingdom (23-24 September) ==
=== Men ===
55 athletes attended the World Cup in Edinburgh.

Rank	Name	Score	Points
1	(France) Romain Desgranges	47+	100
2	(Italy) Stefano Ghisolfi	42+	80
3	(Austria) Jakob Schubert	42+	65
4	(Slovenia) Domen Škofic	42+	55
5	(France) Thomas Joannes	42	51
6	(United States) Sean Bailey	39+	47
7	(Austria) Max Rudigier	38	43
8	(Spain) Ramón Julián Puigblanqué	24+	40

=== Women ===
38 athletes attended the World Cup in Edinburgh.

Rank	Name	Score	Points
1	(Slovenia) Janja Garnbret	42	100
2	(Austria) Jessica Pilz	42	80
3	(South Korea) Jain Kim	41+	65
4	(United States) Ashima Shiraishi	41	55
5	(France) Julia Chanourdie	40+	51
6	(Belgium) Anak Verhoeven	40	47
7	(United Kingdom) Hannah Slaney	36+	43
8	(Norway) Tina Johnsen Hafsaas	13+	40

== Wujiang, China (7-8 October) ==
=== Men ===
36 athletes attended the World Cup in Wujiang.

Rank	Name	Score	Points
1	(Italy) Stefano Ghisolfi	Top	100
2	(Japan) Tomoa Narasaki	34	80
3	(South Korea) Hanwool KIM	30+	65
4	(Slovenia) Domen Škofic	30+	55
5	(France) Romain Desgranges	30+	51
6	(South Korea) Jongwon Chon	30+	47
7	(Japan) Yoshiyuki Ogata	27+	43
8	(Japan) Keiichiro Korenaga	24+	40

=== Women ===
30 athletes attended the World Cup in Wujiang.

Rank	Name	Score	Points
1	(Slovenia) Janja Garnbret	Top	100
2	(South Korea) Jain Kim	45+	80
3	(France) Julia Chanourdie	36+	65
4	(Japan) Akiyo Noguchi	33.5+	55
5	(United Kingdom) Molly Thompson-Smith	33.5+	51
6	(United States) Ashima Shiraishi	33+	47
7	(Austria) Jessica Pilz	31+	43
8	(Belgium) Anak Verhoeven	28+	40

== Xiamen, China (14-15 October) ==
=== Men ===
37 athletes attended the World Cup in Xiamen.

Rank	Name	Score	Points
1	(Japan) Keiichiro Korenaga	38+	100
2	(Japan) Tomoa Narasaki	34	80
3	(China) YuFei Pan	33	65
4	(South Korea) Jongwon Chon	31+	55
5	(Ukraine) Fedir Samoilov	30+	51
6	(Japan) Kokoro Fujii	29+	47
7	(Italy) Stefano Ghisolfi	26+	43
8	(China) HaiBin Qu	17+	40

=== Women ===
26 athletes attended the World Cup in Xiamen.

Rank	Name	Score	Points
1	(Belgium) Anak Verhoeven	Top	100
2	(United States) Ashima Shiraishi	34+	80
3	(Slovenia) Janja Garnbret	33+	65
4	(Austria) Jessica Pilz	33+	55
5	(Slovenia) Mina Markovič	33+	51
6	(Japan) Akiyo Noguchi	32+	45
6	(United Kingdom) Molly Thompson-Smith	32+	45
8	(South Korea) Jain Kim	31+	38
8	(Austria) Hannah Schubert	31+	38
10	(Japan) Risa Ota	23+	34
11	(France) Mathilde Becerra	22+	28
11	(France) Julia Chanourdie	22+	28
11	(Japan) Mei Kotake	22+	28

== Kranj, Slovenia (11-12 November) ==
=== Men ===
61 athletes attended the World Cup in Kranj.

Rank	Name	Score	Points
1	(Austria) Jakob Schubert	Top	100
2	(Germany) Alexander Megos	38+	80
3	(Russia) Dmitrii Fakirianov	36	65
4	(Slovenia) Domen Škofic	33+	55
5	(Italy) Stefano Ghisolfi	32+	51
6	(Italy) Francesco Vettorata	31+	47
7	(Italy) Marcello Bombardi	31	43
8	(Germany) Jan Hojer	31	40

=== Women ===
52 athletes attended the World Cup in Kranj.

Rank	Name	Score	Points
1	(Slovenia) Janja Garnbret	44+	100
2	(South Korea) Jain Kim	43	80
3	(United Kingdom) Molly Thompson-Smith	33+	65
4	(France) Julia Chanourdie	33+	55
5	(Slovenia) Mina Markovič	32+	51
6	(United Kingdom) Shauna Coxsey	29+	47
7	(Slovenia) Vita Lukan	23+	43
8	(Belgium) Anak Verhoeven	23	40
