= 2017 IFSC Climbing World Cup =

International sport climbing competition

- Location: Meiringen, Switzerland Chongqing, China; Nanjing, China; Hachioji, Japan; Vail, United States; Navi Mumbai, India; Villars, Switzerland; Chamonix, France; Briançon, France; Munich, Germany; Arco, Italy; Edinburgh, United Kingdom; Wujiang, China; Xiamen, China Kranj, Slovenia
- Date: 7 April – 12 November 2017

Champions
- Men: (B) (South Korea) Chon Jong-won (L) (France) Romain Desgranges (S) (Russia) Vladislav Deulin (C) (Japan) Tomoa Narasaki
- Women: (B) (United Kingdom) Shauna Coxsey (L) (Slovenia) Janja Garnbret (S) (France) Anouck Jaubert (C) (Slovenia) Janja Garnbret

The 2017 IFSC Climbing World Cup was held in 15 locations. Bouldering competitions were held in 7 locations, lead in 8 locations, and speed in 7 locations. The season began on 7 April in Meiringen, Switzerland and concluded on 12 November in Kranj, Slovenia.

The top 3 in each competition received medals, and the overall winners were awarded trophies. At the end of the season an overall ranking was determined based upon points, which athletes were awarded for finishing in the top 30 of each individual event.

The winners for bouldering were Chon Jong-won and Shauna Coxsey, for lead Romain Desgranges and Janja Garnbret, and for speed Vladislav Deulin and Anouck Jaubert, men and women respectively.

== Highlights of the season ==
In lead climbing, Janja Garnbret of Slovenia was the only athlete who never missed a podium in all 8 lead competitions of the season.

In speed climbing, at the first Speed World Cup of the season in Chongqing, Iuliia Kaplina of Russia set a new world record of 7.46 seconds, breaking her previous world record of 7.53 seconds she set at the 2015 Speed World Cup in Chamonix. Then the next week, at the World Cup in Nanjing, Reza Alipour of Iran and Russia's Iuliia Kaplina set new world records on their way to the men's and women's speed titles of 5.48 and 7.38 seconds respectively. The previous world record for the men was set at 5.60sec by Danyil Boldyrev of Ukraine at the IFSC World Championships in 2014, while for the women was 7.46sec by Iuliia Kaplina herself just a week before in Chongqing.

== Changes from the previous season ==
For the 2017 season, the IFSC changed the timing method for the finals of World Cup tournaments. First, climbing time for lead finals was reduced from eight to six minutes. Second, climbing time for bouldering finals was reduced from four minutes plus to four minutes dead. This means climbers can no longer continue their attempt after the four minute mark, even if they're off the mats before the clock runs out, which was the previous rule.

== Streaming controversy ==
Before the start of the 2017 season, the IFSC announced that they had signed a three-year contract with the streaming platform FloSports, which would have made the streams of climbing World Cups available only to paying customers instead of being freely accessible. This led to an online petition asking the IFSC to change their deal with FloSports, which was signed by more than 12,000 people, and an open letter by the Athletes' Commission. The Commission voiced their frustration over the way the IFSC had previously communicated with the community at large, and "asked the athletes to withdraw cooperation with the livestream media until changes are made". On the next day the IFSC apologized for having made a mistake, and announced that the deal with FloSports had not actually been signed yet despite the earlier press release, and would not be concluded.

== Overview ==
No.	Location	D	G	Gold	Silver	Bronze
1	(Switzerland) Meiringen (7–8 April)	B	M	(Japan) Kokoro Fujii	(Russia) Alexey Rubtsov	(Japan) Keita Watabe
1	(Switzerland) Meiringen (7–8 April)	B	W	(United Kingdom) Shauna Coxsey	(Austria) Katharina Saurwein	(Japan) Miho Nonaka
2	(China) Chongqing (22–23 April)	B	M	(South Korea) Jongwon Chon	(Japan) Tomoa Narasaki	(Russia) Alexey Rubtsov
2	(China) Chongqing (22–23 April)	B	W	(Slovenia) Janja Garnbret	(United Kingdom) Shauna Coxsey	(Japan) Akiyo Noguchi
2	(China) Chongqing (22–23 April)	S	M	(Russia) Vladislav Deulin	(Russia) Stanislav Kokorin	(Ukraine) Danyil Boldyrev
2	(China) Chongqing (22–23 April)	S	W	(Russia) Iuliia Kaplina	(Russia) Mariia Krasavina	(Ukraine) Alla Marenych
3	(China) Nanjing (29–30 April)	B	M	(Japan) Keita Watabe	(Japan) Tomoa Narasaki	(Slovenia) Jernej Kruder
3	(China) Nanjing (29–30 April)	B	W	(United Kingdom) Shauna Coxsey	(Slovenia) Janja Garnbret	(Japan) Miho Nonaka
3	(China) Nanjing (29–30 April)	S	M	(Iran) Reza Alipour	(Russia) Aleksandr Shikov	(Russia) Vladislav Deulin
3	(China) Nanjing (29–30 April)	S	W	(Russia) Iuliia Kaplina	(Russia) Mariia Krasavina	(France) Anouck Jaubert
4	(Japan) Hachioji (6–7 May)	B	M	(Russia) Alexey Rubtsov	(Japan) Tomoa Narasaki	(Japan) Keita Watabe
4	(Japan) Hachioji (6–7 May)	B	W	(Slovenia) Janja Garnbret	(Japan) Akiyo Noguchi	(Japan) Miho Nonaka
5	(United States) Vail (9–10 June)	B	M	(South Korea) Jongwon Chon	(Japan) Meichi Narasaki	(Japan) Yoshiyuki Ogata
5	(United States) Vail (9–10 June)	B	W	(United Kingdom) Shauna Coxsey	(Japan) Akiyo Noguchi	(Japan) Miho Nonaka
6	(India) Navi Mumbai (24–25 June)	B	M	(South Korea) Jongwon Chon	(Japan) Rei Sugimoto	(Russia) Alexey Rubtsov
6	(India) Navi Mumbai (24–25 June)	B	W	(United Kingdom) Shauna Coxsey	(Japan) Miho Nonaka	(Japan) Akiyo Noguchi
7	(Switzerland) Villars (7-8 July)	L	M	(France) Romain Desgranges	(Slovenia) Domen Škofic	(Ukraine) Fedir Samoilov
7	(Switzerland) Villars (7-8 July)	L	W	(Slovenia) Janja Garnbret	(Slovenia) Mina Markovič	(Belgium) Anak Verhoeven
7	(Switzerland) Villars (7-8 July)	S	M	(Iran) Reza Alipour	(Russia) Stanislav Kokorin	(Russia) Vladislav Deulin
7	(Switzerland) Villars (7-8 July)	S	W	(France) Anouck Jaubert	(Russia) Iuliia Kaplina	(Russia) Mariia Krasavina
8	(France) Chamonix (12-13 July)	L	M	(Italy) Marcello Bombardi	(Japan) Keiichiro Korenaga	(Japan) Yuki Hada
8	(France) Chamonix (12-13 July)	L	W	(Slovenia) Janja Garnbret	(South Korea) Jain Kim	(Belgium) Anak Verhoeven
9	(France) Briançon (28-29 July)	L	M	(France) Romain Desgranges	(Canada) Sean McColl	(Italy) Stefano Ghisolfi
9	(France) Briançon (28-29 July)	L	W	(Slovenia) Janja Garnbret	(Belgium) Anak Verhoeven	(South Korea) Jain Kim
10	(Germany) Munich (18–19 August)	B	M	(Germany) Jan Hojer	(Japan) Tomoa Narasaki	(Japan) Taisei Ishimatsu
10	(Germany) Munich (18–19 August)	B	W	(Slovenia) Janja Garnbret	(United Kingdom) Shauna Coxsey	(Japan) Akiyo Noguchi
11	(Italy) Arco (25-26 August)	L	M	(Austria) Jakob Schubert	(Czech Republic) Adam Ondra	(Austria) Max Rudigier
11	(Italy) Arco (25-26 August)	L	W	(South Korea) Jain Kim	(Switzerland) Anne-Sophie Koller	(Slovenia) Janja Garnbret
11	(Italy) Arco (25-26 August)	S	M	(Russia) Vladislav Deulin	(Iran) Reza Alipour	(Italy) Ludovico Fossali
11	(Italy) Arco (25-26 August)	S	W	(France) Anouck Jaubert	(Russia) Iuliia Kaplina	(Russia) Anna Tsyganova
12	(United Kingdom) Edinburgh (23-24 September)	L	M	(France) Romain Desgranges	(Italy) Stefano Ghisolfi	(Austria) Jakob Schubert
12	(United Kingdom) Edinburgh (23-24 September)	L	W	(Slovenia) Janja Garnbret	(Austria) Jessica Pilz	(South Korea) Jain Kim
12	(United Kingdom) Edinburgh (23-24 September)	S	M	(Italy) Ludovico Fossali	(Russia) Stanislav Kokorin	(Italy) Leonardo Gontero
12	(United Kingdom) Edinburgh (23-24 September)	S	W	(France) Anouck Jaubert	(Russia) Mariia Krasavina	(Russia) Iuliia Kaplina
13	(China) Wujiang (7-8 October)	L	M	(Italy) Stefano Ghisolfi	(Japan) Tomoa Narasaki	(South Korea) Hanwool KIM
13	(China) Wujiang (7-8 October)	L	W	(Slovenia) Janja Garnbret	(South Korea) Jain Kim	(France) Julia Chanourdie
13	(China) Wujiang (7-8 October)	S	M	(Russia) Aleksandr Shikov	(Indonesia) Aspar Jaelolo	(Indonesia) Sufriyanto Rindi
13	(China) Wujiang (7-8 October)	S	W	(Russia) Iuliia Kaplina	(France) Anouck Jaubert	(Russia) Elizaveta Ivanova
14	(China) Xiamen (14-15 October)	L	M	(Japan) Keiichiro Korenaga	(Japan) Tomoa Narasaki	(China) YuFei Pan
14	(China) Xiamen (14-15 October)	L	W	(Belgium) Anak Verhoeven	(United States) Ashima Shiraishi	(Slovenia) Janja Garnbret
14	(China) Xiamen (14-15 October)	S	M	(Russia) Vladislav Deulin	(Indonesia) Aspar Jaelolo	(Ukraine) Kostiantyn Pavlenko
14	(China) Xiamen (14-15 October)	S	W	(France) Anouck Jaubert	(Indonesia) Aries Susanti Rahayu	(Russia) Anna Tsyganova
15	(Slovenia) Kranj (11-12 November)	L	M	(Austria) Jakob Schubert	(Germany) Alexander Megos	(Russia) Dmitrii Fakirianov
15	(Slovenia) Kranj (11-12 November)	L	W	(Slovenia) Janja Garnbret	(South Korea) Jain Kim	(United Kingdom) Molly Thompson-Smith
OVERALL		B	M	(South Korea) Jongwon Chon	(Japan) Tomoa Narasaki	(Russia) Alexey Rubtsov
OVERALL		B	W	(United Kingdom) Shauna Coxsey	(Slovenia) Janja Garnbret	(Japan) Akiyo Noguchi
OVERALL		L	M	(France) Romain Desgranges	(Italy) Stefano Ghisolfi	(Japan) Keiichiro Korenaga
OVERALL		L	W	(Slovenia) Janja Garnbret	(South Korea) Jain Kim	(Belgium) Anak Verhoeven
OVERALL		S	M	(Russia) Vladislav Deulin	(Iran) Reza Alipour	(Italy) Ludovico Fossali
OVERALL		S	W	(France) Anouck Jaubert	(Russia) Iuliia Kaplina	(Russia) Mariia Krasavina
OVERALL		C	M	(Japan) Tomoa Narasaki	(South Korea) Jongwon Chon	(Japan) Kokoro Fujii
OVERALL		C	W	(Slovenia) Janja Garnbret	(South Korea) Jain Kim	(United Kingdom) Shauna Coxsey
NATIONAL TEAMS		B	A	(Japan)	(United Kingdom) Great Britain	Slovenia
NATIONAL TEAMS		L	A	Slovenia	France	(Japan)
NATIONAL TEAMS		S	A	(Russia) Russian Federation	France	Italy

== Bouldering ==
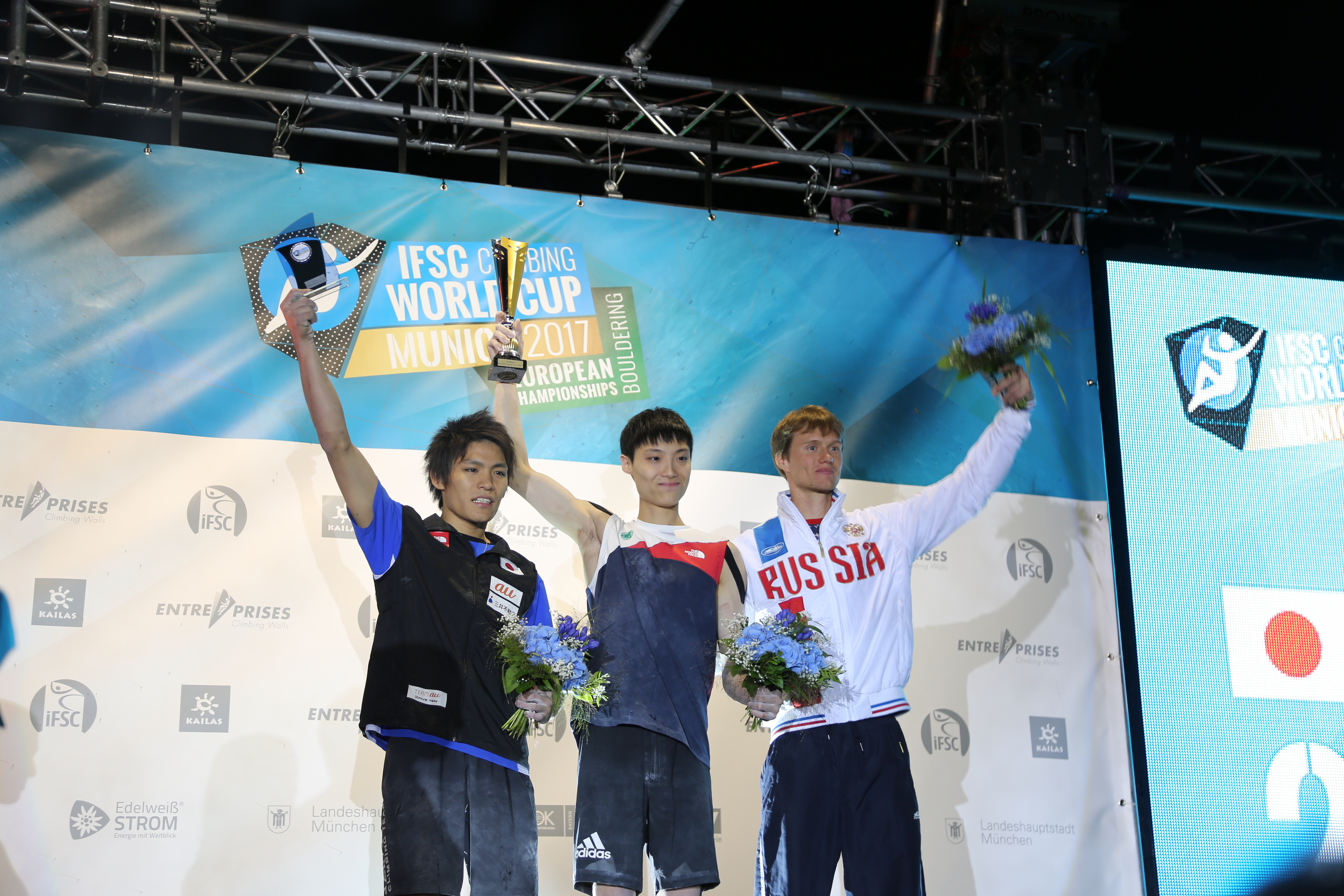
Winners 2017 Men: 1st place: Jongwon Chon KOR, 2nd place: Tomoa Narasaki JPN, 3rd place: Alexey Rubtsov RUS

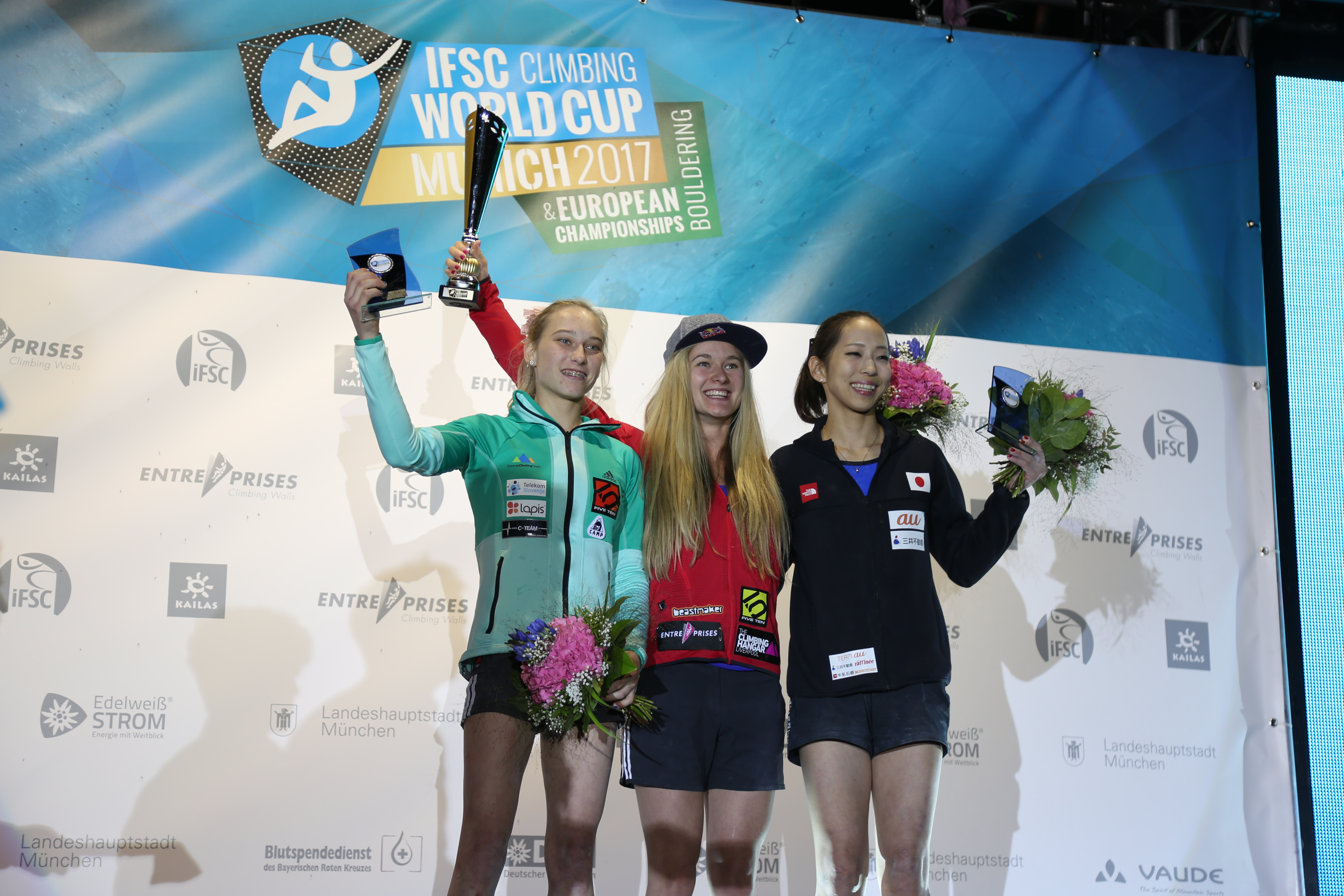
Winners 2017 Women: 1st place: Shauna Coxsey GBR, 2nd place: Janja Garnbret SLO, 3rd. Place: Akiyo Noguchi JPN

An overall ranking was determined based upon points, which athletes were awarded for finishing in the top 30 of each individual event.

=== Men ===
6 best competition results were counted (not counting points in brackets) for IFSC Climbing World Cup 2017.

Rank	Name	Points	Munich	Navi Mumbai	Vail	Hachioji	Nanjing	Chongqing	Meiringen
1	(South Korea) Chon Jong-won	453	4. 55.00	1. 100.00	1. 100.00	7. 43.00	4. 55.00	1. 100.00	12. (28.00)
2	(Japan) Tomoa Narasaki	404	2. 80.00	6. 47.00	9. 37.00	2. 80.00	2. 80.00	2. 80.00	21. (9.00)
3	(Russia) Alexey Rubtsov	399	10. 34.00	3. 65.00	4. 55.00	1. 100.00	23. (7.00)	3. 65.00	2. 80.00
4	(Japan) Keita Watabe	372	-	8. 40.00	6. 47.00	3. 65.00	1. 100.00	4. 55.00	3. 65.00
5	(Japan) Kokoro Fujii	327	6. 47.00	4. 55.00	5. 51.00	9. 37.00	11. (29.00)	9. 37.00	1. 100.00
6	(Japan) Rei Sugimoto	278	-	2. 80.00	10. 34.00	11. 31.00	6. 47.00	11. 31.00	4. 55.00
7	(Germany) Jan Hojer	235	1. 100.00	17. 18.00	16. 20.00	-	7. 43.00	12. 28.00	13. 26.00
8	(Japan) Yoshiyuki Ogata	232	5. 51.00	7. 43.00	3. 65.00	17. 18.00	27. (3.00)	17. 18.00	9. 37.00
9	(Slovenia) Jernej Kruder	201	29. 1.00	9. 37.00	8. 40.00	23. 7.00	3. 65.00	-	5. 51.00
10	(Austria) Jakob Schubert	186	9. 37.00	5. 51.00	-	5. 51.00	-	8. 40.00	23. 7.00

=== Women ===
6 best competition results were counted (not counting points in brackets) for IFSC Climbing World Cup 2017.

Rank	Name	Points	Munich	Navi Mumbai	Vail	Hachioji	Nanjing	Chongqing	Meiringen
1	(United Kingdom) Shauna Coxsey	560	2. 80.00	1. 100.00	1. 100.00	4. (55.00)	1. 100.00	2. 80.00	1. 100.00
2	(Slovenia) Janja Garnbret	470	1. 100.00	-	7. 43.00	1. 100.00	2. 80.00	1. 100.00	6. 47.00
3	(Japan) Akiyo Noguchi	381	3. 65.00	3. 65.00	2. 80.00	2. 80.00	13. 26.00	3. 65.00	21. (9.00)
4	(Japan) Miho Nonaka	377	10. (34.00)	2. 80.00	3. 65.00	3. 65.00	3. 65.00	9. 37.00	3. 65.00
5	(Switzerland) Petra Klingler	290	6. 47.00	4. 55.00	6. 47.00	6. 47.00	9. (37.00)	7. 43.00	5. 51.00
6	(Serbia) Staša Gejo	234	4. 55.00	-	27. 3.00	8. 40.00	10. 34.00	6. 47.00	4. 55.00
7	(Slovenia) Katja Kadic	227	11. 31.00	5. 51.00	5. 51.00	21. (9.00)	7. 43.00	11. 31.00	16. 20.00
8	(United Kingdom) Michaela Tracy	190	15. (21.00)	13. 26.00	10. 34.00	10. 34.00	11. 31.00	15. 22.00	7. 43.00
9	(France) Fanny Gibert	187	8. 40.00	-	-	5. 51.00	12. 28.00	12. 28.00	8. 40.00
10	(Japan) Aya Onoe	165	-	6. 47.00	11. 31.00	12. 27.00	5. 51.00	21. 9.00	-

=== National Teams ===
For National Team Ranking, 3 best results per competition and category were counted (not counting results in brackets).

Country names as used by the IFSC

Rank	Nation	Points	Munich	Navi Mumbai	Vail	Hachioji	Nanjing	Chongqing	Meiringen
1	(Japan)	2118	(295)	374	372	364	390	300	318
2	(United Kingdom) Great Britain	929	146	169	166	129	173	(103)	146
3	Slovenia	927	188	152	135	(116)	188	131	133
4	Germany	736	176	126	(63)	92	104	104	134
5	France	715	151	-	-	190	112	122	140
6	(South Korea) Republic of Korea	694	69	118	140	98	128	141	(65)
7	(Russia) Russian Federation	608	112	145	55	103	(48)	89	104
8	Austria	548	71	115	62	92	(54)	116	92
9	(Switzerland) Suisse	368	59	56	71	47	(42)	50	85
10	United States	340	77	-	155	27	37	7	37

== Lead ==
An overall ranking was determined based upon points, which athletes were awarded for finishing in the top 30 of each individual event.

=== Men ===
7 best competition results were counted (not counting points in brackets) for IFSC Climbing Worldcup 2017. Romain Desgranges won.

Rank	Name	Points	Kranj	Xiamen	Wujiang	Edinburgh	Arco	Briançon	Chamonix	Villars
1	(France) Romain Desgranges	477	9. 37.00	22. (9.00)	5. 51.00	1. 100.00	10. 34.00	1. 100.00	4. 55.00	1. 100.00
2	(Italy) Stefano Ghisolfi	413	5. 51.00	7. 43.00	1. 100.00	2. 80.00	18. (16.00)	3. 65.00	7. 43.00	11. 31.00
3	(Japan) Keiichiro Korenaga	373	10. (32.00)	1. 100.00	8. 40.00	10. 34.00	5. 51.00	10. 34.00	2. 80.00	10. 34.00
4	(Slovenia) Domen Škofic	325	4. 55.00	17. 18.00	4. 55.00	4. 55.00	21. (10.00)	9. 37.00	13. 25.00	2. 80.00
5	(Italy) Marcello Bombardi	289	7. 43.00	23. (8.00)	17. 18.00	12. 28.00	9. 37.00	6. 47.00	1. 100.00	18. 16.00
6	(Austria) Jakob Schubert	265	1. 100.00	-	-	3. 65.00	1. 100.00	-	-	-
7	(France) Thomas Joannes	221	12. 28.00	9. 37.00	16. 20.00	5. 51.00	6. 47.00	19. 14.00	27. (2.00)	14. 24.00
8	(South Korea) Kim Han-wool	213	14. 24.00	10. 34.00	3. 65.00	13. 26.00	15. 22.00	13. 26.00	16. 16.00	29. (2.00)
9	(Ukraine) Fedir Samoilov	193	15. 22.00	5. 51.00	25. 6.00	9. 37.00	24. 7.00	-	26. 5.00	3. 65.00
10	(Italy) Francesco Vettorata	182	6. 47.00	14. 24.00	14. 24.00	-	16. 19.00	14. 24.00	9. 35.00	22. 9.00

=== Women ===
7 best competition results were counted (not counting points in brackets) for IFSC Climbing Worldcup 2017. Janja Garnbret won.

Rank	Name	Points	Kranj	Xiamen	Wujiang	Edinburgh	Arco	Briançon	Chamonix	Villars
1	(Slovenia) Janja Garnbret	665	1. 100.00	3. 65.00	1. 100.00	1. 100.00	3. (65.00)	1. 100.00	1. 100.00	1. 100.00
2	(South Korea) Jain Kim	525	2. 80.00	8. (38.00)	2. 80.00	3. 65.00	1. 100.00	3. 65.00	2. 80.00	4. 55.00
3	(Belgium) Anak Verhoeven	444	8. 40.00	1. 100.00	8. (40.00)	6. 47.00	6. 47.00	2. 80.00	3. 65.00	3. 65.00
4	(Austria) Jessica Pilz	374	-	4. 55.00	7. 43.00	2. 80.00	7. 43.00	5. 51.00	5. 51.00	5. 51.00
5	(France) Julia Chanourdie	362	4. 55.00	11. (28.00)	3. 65.00	5. 51.00	4. 55.00	4. 55.00	6. 47.00	10. 34.00
6	(Slovenia) Mina Markovič	304	5. 51.00	5. 51.00	10. 34.00	15. 22.00	21. (10.00)	8. 40.00	13. 26.00	2. 80.00
7	(United Kingdom) Molly Thompson-Smith	267	3. 65.00	6. 45.00	5. 51.00	9. 35.00	8. 40.00	11. 31.00	-	-
8	(United States) Ashima Shiraishi	233	-	2. 80.00	6. 47.00	4. 55.00	5. 51.00	-	-	-
9	(Switzerland) Anne-Sophie Koller	210	11. 31.00	-	-	18. 16.00	2. 80.00	22. 9.00	9. 37.00	9. 37.00
10	(Austria) Hannah Schubert	204	16. 20.00	8. 38.00	13. 26.00	9. 35.00	19. 14.00	19. (14.00)	12. 28.00	7. 43.00

=== National Teams ===
For National Team Ranking, 3 best results per competition and category were counted (not counting results in brackets). Slovenia won.

Rank	Nation	Points	Kranj	Xiamen	Wujiang	Edinburgh	Arco	Briançon	Chamonix	Villars
1	Slovenia	1473	273	134	189	201	(86)	197	196	283
2	France	1440	132	(124)	195	248	180	280	173	232
3	(Japan)	1418	169	334	261	(97)	166	172	198	118
4	Austria	1070	144	127	(91)	242	224	125	95	113
5	Italy	1022	148	(95)	160	154	115	139	193	113
6	(South Korea) Republic of Korea	895	113	164	205	97	124	96	96	(57)
7	Belgium	642	88	106	(41)	70	49	110	116	103
8	United States	628	-	81	52	149	124	126	56	40
9	(Germany)	576	136	(35)	85	37	66	59	69	124
10	(United Kingdom) Great Britain	432	112	45	51	104	69	51	-	-

== Speed ==
An overall ranking was determined based upon points, which athletes were awarded for finishing in the top 30 of each individual event.

=== Men ===
6 best competition results were counted (not counting points in brackets) for IFSC Climbing World Cup 2017. Vladislav Deulin won.

Rank	Name	Points	Xiamen	Wujiang	Edinburgh	Arco	Villars	Nanjing	Chongqing
1	(Russia) Vladislav Deulin	470.00	1. 100.00	8. 40.00	8. (40.00)	1. 100.00	3. 65.00	3. 65.00	1. 100.00
2	(Iran) Reza Alipour	351.00	12. 28.00	-	-	2. 80.00	1. 100.00	1. 100.00	7. 43.00
3	(Italy) Ludovico Fossali	346.00	4. 55.00	9. 37.00	1. 100.00	3. 65.00	4. 55.00	10. 34.00	16. (20.00)
4	(Russia) Aleksandr Shikov	338.00	14. (24.00)	1. 100.00	4. 55.00	13. 26.00	13. 26.00	2. 80.00	5. 51.00
5	(Russia) Stanislav Kokorin	331.00	15. (22.00)	12. 28.00	2. 80.00	9. 37.00	2. 80.00	13. 26.00	2. 80.00
6	(Italy) Leonardo Gontero	284.00	11. 31.00	13. (26.00)	3. 65.00	6. 47.00	7. 43.00	5. 51.00	6. 47.00
7	(China) Zhong Qixin	196.00	6. 47.00	6. 47.00	-	15. 22.00	-	7. 43.00	9. 37.00
8	(France) Guillaume Moro	181.00	7. 43.00	18. 16.00	5. 51.00	10. 34.00	9. 37.00	-	-
9	(Ukraine) Danyil Boldyrev	167.00	-	-	-	4. 55.00	-	6. 47.00	3. 65.00
10	(Poland) Marcin Dzieński	164.00	21. (10.00)	11. 31.00	15. 22.00	14. 24.00	5. 51.00	16. 20.00	18. 16.00

=== Women ===
6 best competition results were counted (not counting points in brackets) for IFSC Climbing World Cup 2017. Anouck Jaubert won.

Rank	Name	Points	Xiamen	Wujiang	Edinburgh	Arco	Villars	Nanjing	Chongqing
1	(France) Anouck Jaubert	545.00	1. 100.00	2. 80.00	1. 100.00	1. 100.00	1. 100.00	3. 65.00	5. (51.00)
2	(Russia) Iuliia Kaplina	525.00	23. (8.00)	1. 100.00	3. 65.00	2. 80.00	2. 80.00	1. 100.00	1. 100.00
3	(Russia) Mariia Krasavina	395.00	7. 43.00	6. 47.00	2. 80.00	11. (31.00)	3. 65.00	2. 80.00	2. 80.00
4	(Russia) Anna Tsyganova	331.00	3. 65.00	8. 40.00	-	3. 65.00	5. 51.00	4. 55.00	4. 55.00
5	(Ukraine) Alla Marenych	280.00	6. 47.00	9. 37.00	7. 43.00	9. 37.00	12. (28.00)	5. 51.00	3. 65.00
6	(France) Aurelia Sarisson	276.00	5. 51.00	5. 51.00	8. 40.00	5. 51.00	13. (26.00)	7. 43.00	8. 40.00
7	(Poland) Anna Brozek	271.00	11. (31.00)	10. 34.00	4. 55.00	4. 55.00	7. 43.00	9. 37.00	6. 47.00
8	(Poland) Edyta Ropek	213.00	17. 18.00	21. (10.00)	10. 34.00	7. 43.00	9. 37.00	6. 47.00	10. 34.00
9	(Poland) Klaudia Buczek	179.00	19. (14.00)	12. 28.00	9. 37.00	8. 40.00	17. 18.00	10. 34.00	15. 22.00
10	(France) Victoire Andrier	177.00	12. 28.00	11. 31.00	5. 51.00	16. 20.00	6. 47.00	-	-

=== National Teams ===
For National Team Ranking, 3 best results per competition and category were counted (not counting results in brackets). Russian Federation won.

Rank	Nation	Points	Xiamen	Wujiang	Edinburgh	Arco	Villars	Nanjing	Chongqing
1	(Russia) Russian Federation	2358	333	406	(320)	344	392	417	466
2	France	1220	222	178	242	205	210	163	(146)
3	Italy	996	114	93	305	225	152	107	(81)
4	Poland	919	(82)	112	191	177	182	138	119
5	Indonesia	793	329	324	-	-	140	-	-
6	People's Republic of China	670	141	155	-	22	-	160	192
7	Ukraine	596	112	71	43	94	(40)	122	154
8	Islamic Republic of Iran	392	35	-	-	114	100	100	43
9	Czech Republic	191	-	-	37	50	24	40	40
10	Austria	144	-	8	81	34	21	-	-

== Combined ==
Maximum number of counting results per discipline: Lead: 7, Boulder: 6, Speed: 6. Not counting points are in brackets.

=== Men ===
The results of the ten most successful athletes of the Combined World Cup 2017:

Rank	Name	Points
1	(Japan) Tomoa Narasaki	571.00
2	(South Korea) Chon Jong-won	564.00
3	(Japan) Kokoro Fujii	489.00
4	(France) Romain Desgranges	477.00
5	(Russia) Vladislav Deulin	470.00
6	(Austria) Jakob Schubert	451.00
7	(Germany) Jan Hojer	432.00
8	(Russia) Alexey Rubtsov	427.00
9	(Italy) Stefano Ghisolfi	413.00
10	(Japan) Keiichiro Korenaga	373.00

=== Women ===
The results of the ten most successful athletes of the Combined World Cup 2017:

Rank	Name	Points
1	(Slovenia) Janja Garnbret	1135.00
2	(South Korea) Jain Kim	626.00
3	(United Kingdom) Shauna Coxsey	607.00
4	(France) Anouck Jaubert	545.00
5	(Russia) Iuliia Kaplina	525.00
6	(Japan) Akiyo Noguchi	518.00
7	(Belgium) Anak Verhoeven	444.00
8	(Russia) Mariia Krasavina	395.00
8	(Japan) Miho Nonaka	395.00
10	(Austria) Jessica Pilz	387.00

== Season podium table ==
Rank	Nation	Gold	Silver	Bronze	Total
1	Slovenia (SLO)	2	1	0	3
2	France (FRA)	2	0	0	2
3	South Korea (KOR)	1	3	0	4
4	Japan (JPN)	1	1	3	5
5	Russia (RUS)	1	1	2	4
6	Great Britain (GBR)	1	0	1	2
7	Italy (ITA)	0	1	1	2
8	Iran (IRN)	0	1	0	1
9	Belgium (BEL)	0	0	1	1
Totals (9 entries)		8	8	8	24

== Medal table ==
Rank	Nation	Gold	Silver	Bronze	Total
1	Slovenia (SLO)	9	3	3	15
2	Russia (RUS)	8	10	10	28
3	France (FRA)	7	1	2	10
4	South Korea (KOR)	4	3	3	10
5	Great Britain (GBR)	4	2	1	7
6	Japan (JPN)	3	12	12	27
7	Italy (ITA)	3	1	3	7
8	Austria (AUT)	2	2	2	6
9	Iran (IRN)	2	1	0	3
10	Belgium (BEL)	1	1	2	4
11	Germany (GER)	1	1	0	2
12	Indonesia (INA)	0	3	1	4
13	Canada (CAN)	0	1	0	1
13	Czech Republic (CZE)	0	1	0	1
13	Switzerland (SUI)	0	1	0	1
13	United States (USA)	0	1	0	1
17	Ukraine (UKR)	0	0	4	4
18	China (CHN)	0	0	1	1
Totals (18 entries)		44	44	44	132
