= Lead climbing at the 2018 IFSC Climbing World Cup =

Competition results

- Location: Villars, Switzerland Chamonix, France; Briançon, France; Arco, Italy; Kranj, Slovenia; Wujiang, China Xiamen, China
- Dates: 6 July – 28 October 2018

Champions
- Men: (Austria) Jakob Schubert
- Women: (Slovenia) Janja Garnbret

Lead climbing competitions at the 2018 IFSC Climbing World Cup were held at seven locations, from 6 July to 28 October 2018. The top three in each competition received medals, and at the end of the season, the overall winners were awarded trophies. The overall winners were determined based upon points, which athletes were awarded for finishing in the top 30 of each individual event. Jakob Schubert won the men's seasonal title, Janja Garnbret won the women's seasonal title, and Austria won the national team title.

== Overall ranking ==
An overall ranking was determined based upon points, which athletes were awarded for finishing in the top 30 of each individual event.

=== Men ===
6 best competition results were counted (not counting points in brackets) for the IFSC Climbing World Cup 2018.

Rank	Name	Points	Xiamen	Wujiang	Kranj	Arco	Briançon	Chamonix	Villars
1	(Austria) Jakob Schubert	495.00	16. (20.00)	2. 80.00	2. 80.00	1. 100.00	4. 55.00	2. 80.00	1. 100.00
2	(Italy) Stefano Ghisolfi	466.00	2. 80.00	5. 51.00	1. 100.00	2. 80.00	5. (51.00)	1. 100.00	4. 55.00
3	(France) Romain Desgranges	356.00	6. 47.00	1. 100.00	20. 12.00	9. 37.00	2. 80.00	27. (4.00)	2. 80.00
3	(Slovenia) Domen Škofic	356.00	1. 100.00	19. (14.00)	12. 28.00	3. 65.00	3. 65.00	4. 55.00	7. 43.00
5	(South Korea) Hyunbin Min	251.00	3. 65.00	3. 65.00	-	8. 40.00	17. 18.00	18. 16.00	6. 47.00
6	(Germany) Alexander Megos	230.00	-	-	-	12. 28.00	1. 100.00	3. 65.00	9. 37.00
7	(Japan) Taisei Homma	217.00	5. 51.00	8. 40.00	13. 26.00	-	9. 37.00	7. 43.00	16. 20.00
8	(Switzerland) Sascha Lehmann	206.00	8. 40.00	17. 18.00	25. (6.00)	6. 47.00	7. 43.00	8. 40.00	17. 18.00
9	(Japan) Yuki Hada	192.00	7. 43.00	20. (12.00)	7. 43.00	14. 24.00	12. 28.00	19. 14.00	8. 40.00
10	(Italy) Francesco Vettorata	168.00	15. 22.00	6. 47.00	6. 47.00	22. 9.00	20. 12.00	11. 31.00	-

=== Women ===
6 best competition results were counted (not counting points in brackets) for the IFSC Climbing World Cup 2018.

Rank	Name	Points	Xiamen	Wujiang	Kranj	Arco	Briançon	Chamonix	Villars
1	(Slovenia) Janja Garnbret	550.00	2. 80.00	1. 90.00	2. 80.00	1. 100.00	1. 100.00	2. (80.00)	1. 100.00
2	(Austria) Jessica Pilz	505.00	1. 100.00	3. 65.00	4. (55.00)	2. 80.00	2. 80.00	1. 100.00	2. 80.00
3	(South Korea) Jain Kim	354.00	10. 34.00	1. 90.00	1. 100.00	-	-	3. 65.00	3. 65.00
4	(France) Manon Hily	238.00	14. (24.00)	8. 40.00	11. 31.00	6. 47.00	11. 31.00	10. 34.00	4. 55.00
5	(Japan) Mei Kotake	228.00	5. 51.00	13. 26.00	9. 37.00	16. 20.00	-	5. 51.00	7. 43.00
6	(Slovenia) Tjasa Kalan	224.00	7. 43.00	6. 45.00	12. 28.00	9. 37.00	28. (3.00)	9. 37.00	9. 34.00
7	(Austria) Hannah Schubert	219.00	11. 31.00	9. 37.00	3. 65.00	19. (14.00)	13. 26.00	8. 40.00	16. 20.00
8	(Slovenia) Mina Markovič	214.00	6. 47.00	22. (9.00)	8. 40.00	10. 34.00	5. 51.00	12. 28.00	19. 14.00
8	(Japan) Akiyo Noguchi	214.00	3. 65.00	4. 55.00	-	-	-	7. 43.00	5. 51.00
10	(Slovenia) Mia Krampl	211.00	4. 55.00	6. 45.00	10. 34.00	-	7. 43.00	21. 10.00	14. 24.00

=== National Teams ===
For National Team Ranking, 3 best results per competition and category were counted (not counting results in brackets).

Rank	Nation	Points	Xiamen	Wujiang	Kranj	Arco	Briançon	Chamonix	Villars
1	Austria	1528	230	269	264	250	(218)	232	283
2	(Japan)	1468	305	246	242	160	(135)	235	280
3	Slovenia	1428	282	194	(182)	238	266	210	238
4	France	959	95	160	(81)	185	251	84	184
5	Italy	822	118	135	202	111	99	157	(55)
6	(South Korea) Republic of Korea	652	107	177	107	41	(27)	91	129
7	Belgium	382	80	55	(22)	105	65	47	30
8	United States	377	15	13	(0)	108	89	105	47
9	(Switzerland) Suisse	373	40	(18)	67	78	49	71	68
10	(Germany)	340	-	-	23	45	100	111	61

== Villars, Switzerland (6-7 July) ==
=== Men ===
91 athletes attended the World Cup in Villars.

Rank	Name	Score	Points
1	(Austria) Jakob Schubert	38+	100
2	(France) Romain Desgranges	38+	80
3	(Japan) Tomoa Narasaki	33+	65
4	(Italy) Stefano Ghisolfi	33+	55
5	(Austria) Max Rudigier	32+	51
6	(South Korea) Hyunbin Min	22+	47
7	(Slovenia) Domen Škofic	22+	43
8	(Japan) Yuki Hada	22+	40

=== Women ===
64 athletes attended the World Cup in Villars.

Rank	Name	Score	Points
1	(Slovenia) Janja Garnbret	44+	100
2	(Austria) Jessica Pilz	42	80
3	(South Korea) Jain Kim	41+	65
4	(France) Manon Hily	36+	55
5	(Japan) Akiyo Noguchi	35+	51
6	(Japan) Miho Nonaka	32+	47
7	(Japan) Mei Kotake	31+	43
8	(United States) Ashima Shiraishi	31+	40

== Chamonix, France (11-13 July) ==
=== Men ===
111 athletes attended the World Cup in Chamonix.

Rank	Name	Score	Points
1	(Italy) Stefano Ghisolfi	Top	100
2	(Austria) Jakob Schubert	48+	80
3	(Germany) Alex Megos	46+	65
4	(Slovenia) Domen Škofic	46+	55
5	(United Kingdom) William Bosi	43+	51
6	(Japan) Shuta Tanaka	43+	47
7	(Japan) Taisei Homma	40+	43
8	(Switzerland) Sascha Lehmann	30+	40

=== Women ===
92 athletes attended the World Cup in Chamonix.

Rank	Name	Score	Points
1	(Austria) Jessica Pilz	Top	100
2	(Slovenia) Janja Garnbret	50+	80
3	(South Korea) Jain Kim	48+	65
4	(United States) Ashima Shiraishi	44	55
5	(Japan) Mei Kotake	42+	51
6	(Belgium) Anak Verhoeven	41	47
7	(Japan) Akiyo Noguchi	40+	43
8	(Austria) Hannah Schubert	40+	40

== Briançon, France (20-21 July) ==
=== Men ===
84 athletes attended the World Cup in Briançon.

Rank	Name	Score	Points
1	(Germany) Alex Megos	45+	100
2	(France) Romain Desgranges	43	80
3	(Slovenia) Domen Škofic	42+	65
4	(Austria) Jakob Schubert	42+	55
5	(Italy) Stefano Ghisolfi	41+	51
6	(France) Thomas Joannes	34+	47
7	(Switzerland) Sascha Lehmann	32	43
8	(Japan) Hiroto Shimizu	28+	40

=== Women ===
66 athletes attended the World Cup in Briançon.

Rank	Name	Score	Points
1	(Slovenia) Janja Garnbret	Top	100
2	(Austria) Jessica Pilz	Top	80
3	(Belgium) Anak Verhoeven	46+	65
4	(United States) Ashima Shiraishi	39+	55
5	(Slovenia) Mina Markovič	39+	51
6	(Slovenia) Vita Lukan	33+	47
7	(Slovenia) Mia Krampl	33+	43
8	(France) Nolwenn Arc	33+	40

== Arco, Italy (27-28 July) ==
=== Men ===
95 athletes attended the World Cup in Arco.

Rank	Name	Score	Points
1	(Austria) Jakob Schubert	44+	100
2	(Italy) Stefano Ghisolfi	41+	80
3	(Slovenia) Domen Škofic	41	65
4	(Czech Republic) Adam Ondra	41	55
5	(Japan) Shuta Tanaka	40+	51
6	(Switzerland) Sascha Lehmann	38+	47
7	(Spain) Alberto Ginés López	32+	43
8	(South Korea) Hyunbin Min	23+	40

=== Women ===
76 athletes attended the World Cup in Arco.

Rank	Name	Score	Points
1	(Slovenia) Janja Garnbret	50+	100
2	(Austria) Jessica Pilz	49+	80
3	(Belgium) Anak Verhoeven	39+	65
4	(United States) Claire Buhrfeind	33+	55
5	(France) Hélène Janicot	31	51
6	(France) Manon Hily	28	47
7	(Ukraine) Ievgeniia Kazbekova	28	43
8	(Austria) Christine Schranz	9	40

== Kranj, Slovenia (29-30 September) ==
=== Men ===
61 athletes attended the World Cup in Kranj.

Rank	Name	Score	Points
1	(Italy) Stefano Ghisolfi	Top	100
2	(Austria) Jakob Schubert	49+	80
3	(Japan) Masahiro Higuchi	43+	65
4	(Italy) Marcello Bombardi	43+	55
5	(Canada) Sean McColl	40+	51
6	(Italy) Francesco Vettorata	36	47
7	(Japan) Yuki Hada	28+	43
8	(Japan) Kokoro Fujii	28	40

=== Women ===
47 athletes attended the World Cup in Kranj.

Rank	Name	Score	Points
1	(South Korea) Jain Kim	41	100
2	(Slovenia) Janja Garnbret	34+	80
3	(Austria) Hannah Schubert	34+	65
4	(Austria) Jessica Pilz	30	55
5	(Austria) Katharina Posch	27+	51
6	(Japan) Natsumi Hirano	13+	47
7	(Switzerland) Katherine Choong	13+	43
8	(Slovenia) Mina Markovič	13+	40

== Wujiang, China (20-21 October) ==
The Lead World Cup finals at Wujiang were cancelled because of bad weather. The women's final was being carried out when it started to rain and made the last few climbers slip off of wet holds. After many considerations and an appeal from the athlete's side, the finals for women and men (which had not been carried out) were cancelled. The winners of the event were then determined based on the results of the semifinals.

=== Men ===
34 athletes attended the World Cup in Wujiang. The finals were cancelled, and the results of the previous round (semi-finals) counted as the final ranking.

Rank	Name	Score	Points
1	(France) Romain Desgranges	35+	100
2	(Austria) Jakob Schubert	32+	80
3	(South Korea) Hyunbin Min	32	65
4	(Japan) Hidemasa Nishida	31+	55
5	(Italy) Stefano Ghisolfi	28+	51
6	(Italy) Francesco Vettorata	28+	47
7	(Ukraine) Fedir Samoilov	28	43
8	(Japan) Taisei Homma	26+	40

=== Women ===
35 athletes attended the World Cup in Wujiang. The finals were cancelled, and the results of the previous round (semi-finals) counted as the final ranking.

Rank	Name	Score	Points
1	(Slovenia) Janja Garnbret	36+	90
1	(South Korea) Jain Kim	36+	90
3	(Austria) Jessica Pilz	36	65
4	(Japan) Akiyo Noguchi	35+	55
5	(Austria) Katharina Posch	31	51
6	(Slovenia) Tjasa Kalan	22+	45
6	(Slovenia) Mia Krampl	22+	45
8	(France) Manon Hily	22+	40

== Xiamen, China (27-28 October) ==
=== Men ===
32 athletes attended the World Cup in Xiamen.

Rank	Name	Score	Points
1	(Slovenia) Domen Škofic	45+	100
2	(Italy) Stefano Ghisolfi	45+	80
3	(South Korea) Hyunbin Min	38+	65
4	(Japan) Hidemasa Nishida	23	55
5	(Japan) Taisei Homma	20+	51
6	(France) Romain Desgranges	20+	47
7	(Japan) Yuki Hada	20+	43
8	(Switzerland) Sascha Lehmann	20+	40

=== Women ===
35 athletes attended the World Cup in Xiamen.

Rank	Name	Score	Points
1	(Austria) Jessica Pilz	Top	100
2	(Slovenia) Janja Garnbret	Top	80
3	(Japan) Akiyo Noguchi	43+	65
4	(Slovenia) Mia Krampl	37+	55
5	(Japan) Mei Kotake	36+	51
6	(Slovenia) Mina Markovič	35	47
7	(Slovenia) Tjasa Kalan	32	43
8	(Japan) Aika Tajima	30+	40
