= Sport climbing at the World Games =

Part of the World Games

Competition climbing is part of the World Games since the edition of Duisburg 2005, with events in competition lead climbing, competition bouldering and competition speed climbing for men and for womnen

== Medalists ==
=== Men ===
==== Lead ====
Games	Gold	Silver	Bronze
2005 Duisburg	Patxi Usobiaga (ESP)	Alexandre Chabot (FRA); Tomáš Mrázek (CZE)	
2009 Kaohsiung	Sachi Amma (JPN)	Patxi Usobiaga (ESP)	Romain Desgranges (FRA)
2013 Cali	Ramón Julián Puigblanque (ESP)	Jakob Schubert (AUT)	Magnus Midtbø (NOR)
2017 Wrocław	Keiichiro Korenaga (JPN)	Yuki Hada (JPN)	Sean McColl (CAN)
2022 Birmingham	Sascha Lehmann (SUI)	Masahiro Higuchi (JPN)	Mejdi Schalck (FRA)

==== Speed ====
Games	Gold	Silver	Bronze
2005 Duisburg	Aleksandr Pechekhonov (RUS)	Sergey Sinitsyn (RUS)	Evgenii Vaitsekhovskii (RUS)
2009 Kaohsiung	Qixin Zhong (CHN)	Evgenii Vaitsekhovskii (RUS)	Maksym Styenkoviy (UKR)
2013 Cali	Dmitriy Timofeev (RUS)	Stanislav Kokorin (RUS)	Qixin Zhong (CHN)
2017 Wrocław	Reza Alipour (IRI)	Danylo Boldyrev (UKR)	Stanislav Kokorin (RUS)
2022 Birmingham	Veddriq Leonardo (INA)	Kiromal Katibin (INA)	Yaroslav Tkach (UKR)

==== Boulder ====
Games	Gold	Silver	Bronze
2017 Wrocław	Yoshiyuki Ogata (JPN)	Jan Hojer (GER)	Alexey Rubtsov (RUS)
2022 Birmingham	Nicolas Collin (BEL)	Kokoro Fujii (JPN)	Yoshiyuki Ogata (JPN)

=== Women ===
==== Lead ====
Games	Gold	Silver	Bronze
2005 Duisburg	Angela Eiter (AUT)	Natalija Gros (SLO)	Marietta Uhden (GER)
2009 Kaohsiung	Maja Vidmar (SLO)	Jain Kim (KOR)	Caroline Ciavaldini (FRA)
2013 Cali	Mina Markovič (SLO)	Jain Kim (KOR)	Dinara Fakhritdinova (RUS)
2017 Wrocław	Anak Verhoeven (BEL)	Janja Garnbret (SLO)	Julia Chanourdie (FRA)
2022 Birmingham	Jessica Pilz (AUT)	Natsuki Tanii (JPN)	Lana Skušek (SLO)

==== Speed ====
Games	Gold	Silver	Bronze
2005 Duisburg	Anna Saulevich (RUS)	Olena Ryepko (UKR)	Tatyana Ruyga (RUS)
2009 Kaohsiung	He Cuilian (CHN)	He Cuifang (CHN)	Olga Morozkina (RUS)
2013 Cali	Alina Gaydamakina (RUS)	Maria Krasavina (RUS)	Iuliia Kaplina (RUS)
2017 Wrocław	Iuliia Kaplina (RUS)	Anouck Jaubert (FRA)	Anna Tsyganova (RUS)
2022 Birmingham	Emma Hunt (USA)	Natalia Kałucka (POL)	Franziska Ritter (GER)

==== Boulder ====
Games	Gold	Silver	Bronze
2017 Wrocław	Staša Gejo (SRB)	Miho Nonaka (JPN)	Fanny Gibert (FRA)
2022 Birmingham	Miho Nonaka (JPN)	Katja Debevec (SLO)	Mao Nakamura (JPN)

== Medal table ==
Rank	Nation	Gold	Silver	Bronze	Total
1	Russia (RUS)	5	4	8	17
2	Japan (JPN)	4	5	2	11
3	Slovenia (SLO)	2	3	1	6
4	China (CHN)	2	1	1	4
5	Austria (AUT)	2	1	0	3
5	Spain (ESP)	2	1	0	3
7	Belgium (BEL)	2	0	0	2
8	Indonesia (INA)	1	1	0	2
9	Iran (IRI)	1	0	0	1
9	Serbia (SRB)	1	0	0	1
9	Switzerland (SUI)	1	0	0	1
9	United States (USA)	1	0	0	1
13	France (FRA)	0	2	5	7
14	Ukraine (UKR)	0	2	2	4
15	South Korea (KOR)	0	2	0	2
16	Germany (GER)	0	1	2	3
17	Czech Republic (CZE)	0	1	0	1
17	Poland (POL)	0	1	0	1
19	Canada (CAN)	0	0	1	1
19	Norway (NOR)	0	0	1	1
Totals (20 entries)		24	25	23	72
