= Sport climbing at the 2017 World Games – Women's lead =

Sport climbing - Women's Lead at the 2017 World Games
- Venue: Nowy Targ Square, Wrocław, Poland
- Dates: 23 July
- Competitors: 11 from 9 nations

Medalists
gold medal	(Belgium) Anak Verhoeven
silver medal	(Slovenia) Janja Garnbret
bronze medal	(France) Julia Chanourdie

The women's lead competition in sport climbing at the 2017 World Games took place on 23 July 2017 at the Nowy Targ Square in Wrocław, Poland.

== Competition format ==
A total of 11 athletes entered the competition. In qualification every athlete has 1 chance to get to the higher point of the course. Top 8 climbers qualify to final. In final if at least 2 climbers have the same score climber, who get the height faster is placing higher.

== Results ==
=== Qualifications ===
Rank	Athlete	Nation	Height	Note
1	Kim Ja-in	South Korea	41+	Q
2	Anak Verhoeven	Belgium	39+	Q
3	Jessica Pilz	Austria	34+	Q
3	Janja Garnbret	Slovenia	34+	Q
3	Akiyo Noguchi	Japan	34+	Q
6	Julia Chanourdie	France	33+	Q
6	Claire Buhrfeind	United States	33+	Q
8	Mina Markovič	Slovenia	31+	Q
9	Margo Hayes	United States	26+	
10	Karina Mirosław	Poland	19+	
10	Lucinda Stirling	Australia	19+	

=== Final ===
Rank	Athlete	Nation	Height
1st place, gold medalist(s)	Anak Verhoeven	Belgium	39+
2nd place, silver medalist(s)	Janja Garnbret	Slovenia	39+
3rd place, bronze medalist(s)	Julia Chanourdie	France	39+
4	Kim Ja-in	South Korea	39
5	Jessica Pilz	Austria	39
6	Akiyo Noguchi	Japan	38
7	Mina Markovič	Slovenia	33+
8	Claire Buhrfeind	United States	29+
