= Molly Thompson-Smith =

British rock climber (born 1997)

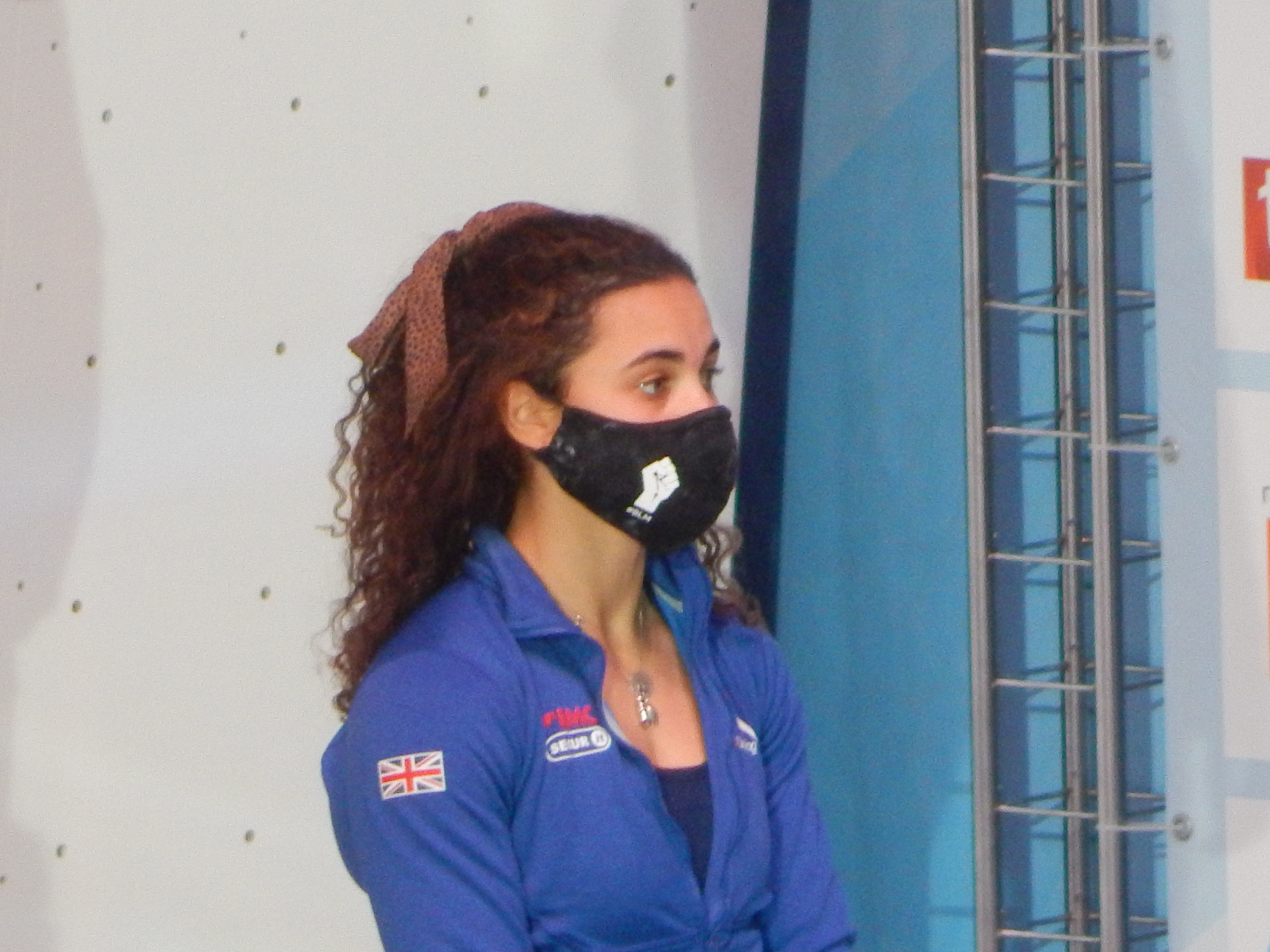
- Thompson-Smith in 2020

Personal information
- Full name: Molly Eleanor Thompson-Smith
- Nationality: British
- Born: 7 November 1997 (age 29) London, England
- Occupation: Professional rock climber
- Height: 1.57 m (5 ft 2 in)

Climbing career
- Type of climber: Competition climbing; Bouldering; Sport climbing
- Highest grade: Redpoint: 8c (5.14b); Onsight/Flash: 8b (5.13d); Bouldering: 8B (V13)
Medal record
Women's competition climbing
Representing Great Britain
World Cup
Bronze medal – third place	2017	Lead

Molly Eleanor Thompson-Smith (born 7 November 1997) is a British rock climber who specialises in competition climbing. She is a five-time UK national competition lead climbing champion Having provided television commentary for the delayed Tokyo 2020 Olympics, Thompson-Smith qualified for the 2024 Summer Olympics in Paris where she finished 19th.

In 2026, Thompson-Smith guest starred in the Makeover Challenge episode of Rupaul's Drag Race: UK vs. the World season three where they were paired with Brazilian drag queen Fontana.
