= Anak Verhoeven =

Belgian rock climber (born 1996)

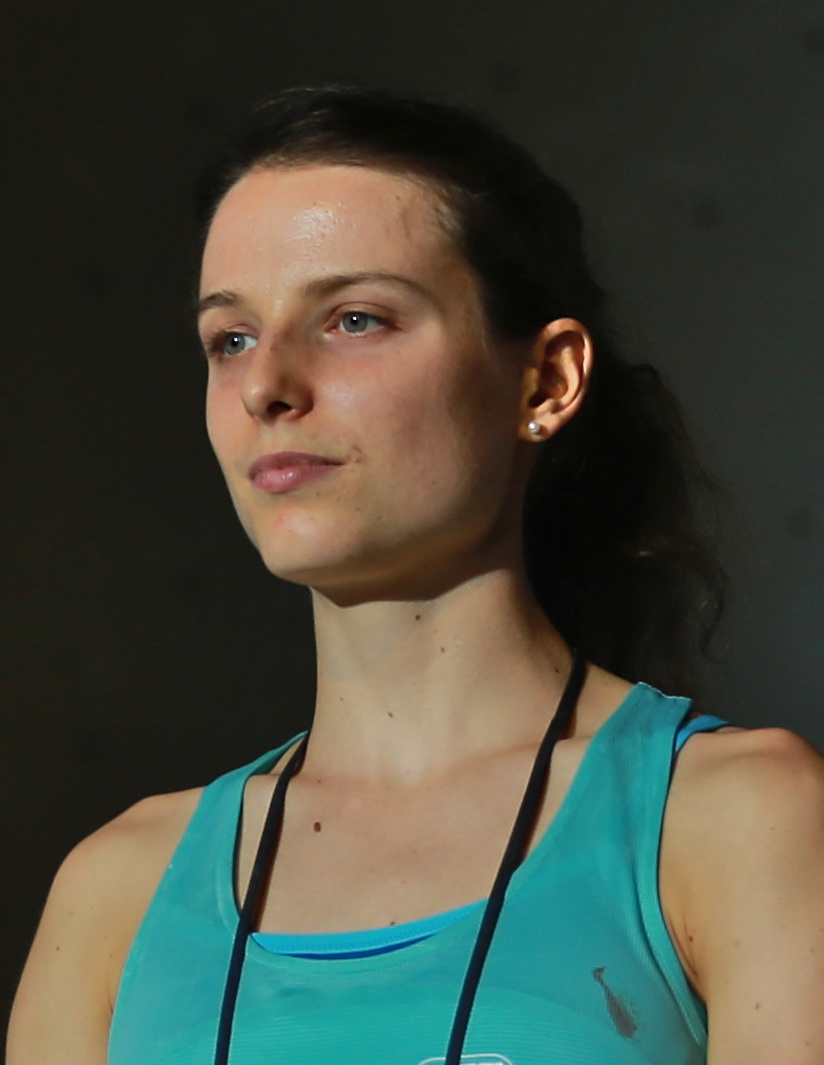
- Verhoeven at the 2018 World Championships, Innsbruck

Personal information
- Born: 15 July 1996 (age 30) Schriek, Belgium
- Occupation: Professional rock climber
- Height: 5 ft 3 in (160 cm)
- Website: www.anakverhoeven.be

Climbing career
- Type of climber: Competition lead climbing; Sport climbing
- Highest grade: Redpoint: 9b (5.15b); Onsight/Flash: 8c (5.14b)
- First ascents: Sang Neuf (9a); Sweef Neuf (9a+); Ciudad de Dios pa la Enmienda (9a/9a+)
- Retired from competition: 2021 (competition)
- Known for: Winning World Games, and European Championships in 2017; Second-ever female to climb at 9a+ (5.15a); First-ever female to do an FFA at 9a+ (5.15a); First-ever female to do an FFA at 9a/9a+; Fourth-ever female to climb at 9b (5.15b)
Medal record
Women's competition climbing
Representing Belgium
World Games
Gold medal – first place	2017	Lead
World Championships
Silver medal – second place	2016 Paris	Lead
World Cup
Second place	2016	Lead
Third place	2017	Lead
European Championships
Gold medal – first place	2017	Lead
Belgian Championships
Gold medal – first place	2016	Lead
Gold medal – first place	2017	Lead
- Updated on 23 January 2022

Anak Verhoeven (born 15 July 1996) is a Belgian rock climber who specializes in sport climbing and in competition lead climbing. She has repeatedly won the Belgian National Championship in lead climbing. In 2016, she ranked first on the IFSC World Ranking List. In 2017, she won both the World Games and IFSC Climbing European Championships. Verhoeven is also one of the strongest female sport climbers, and in 2017, became the first woman in history to establish a new 9a+ (5.15a) route, Sweet Neuf.

== Early life ==
Verhoeven was born in Belgium and started to climb when she was 4 years old. Both her parents were already climbers.

== Climbing career ==
=== Competition climbing ===
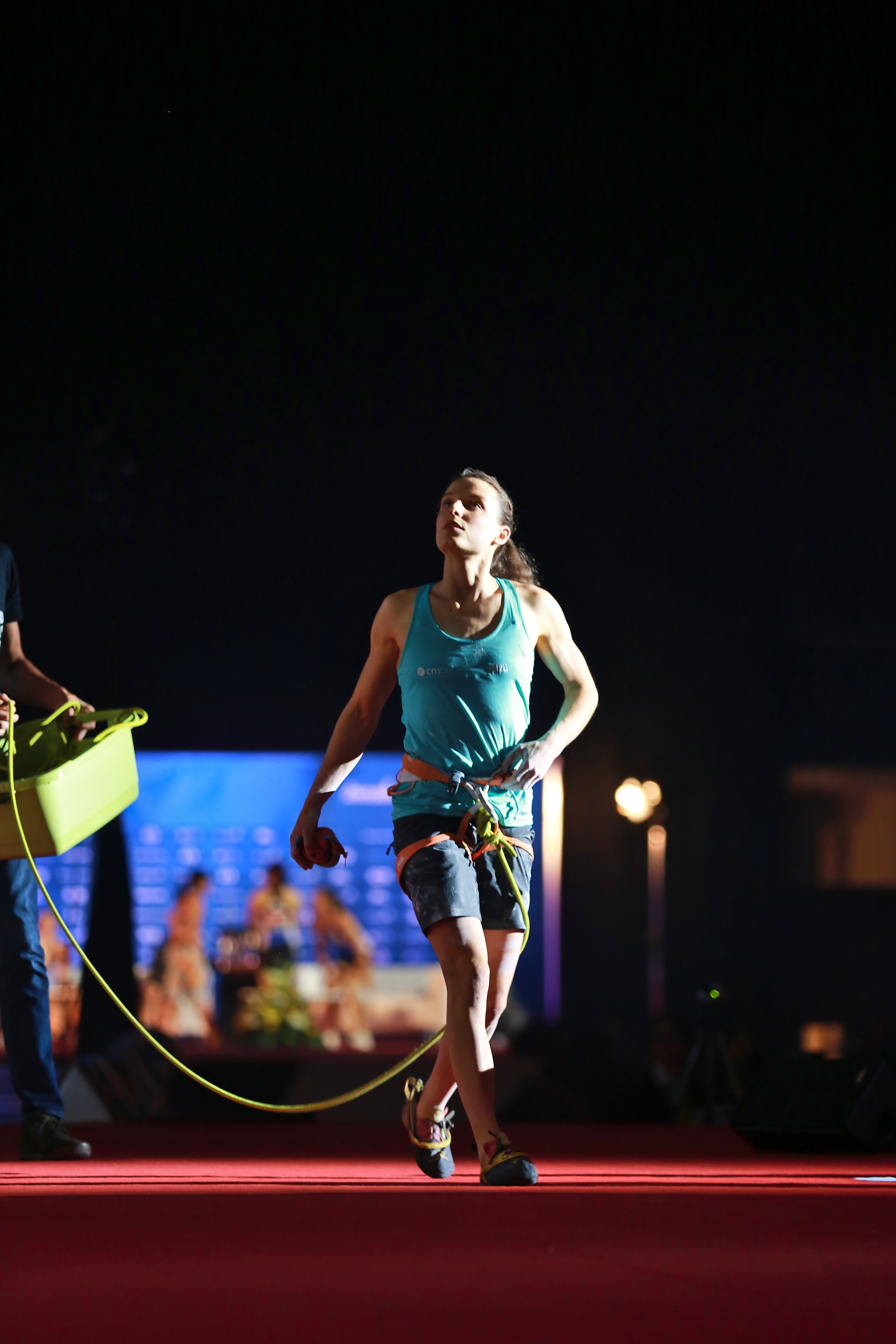
Verhoeven at the Climbing World Championships 2018 Lead Final

In 2012, at age 16, she started participating in the Lead Climbing World Cup, and by 2014, had become the Junior European Champion at the Championships in Edinburgh. In 2015, she won the World Youth Championship in Italy, where she competed for the last time as a junior. In the same year, she also participated in the Lead Climbing World Cup, where she ranked fourth.

In 2016, she competed at the World Championships in Paris. During the finals, she managed to top the route but fellow competitor Janja Garnbret also topped and won gold due to countback. The same year, she also ranked second in the Lead Climbing World Cup. Verhoeven ended the 2016 competition season as number 1 on the IFSC World Ranking List. In 2017, she won both the World Games and IFSC Climbing European Championships.

In late 2017, Verhoeven was forced to take time off from competition climbing with a serious elbow injury from which she did not fully recover until 2019. In June 2021, Verhoeven announced that she was retiring from competition climbing to focus on her outdoor rock climbing projects.

=== Rock climbing ===
In September 2017, she did the first free ascent (FFA) of the 9a (5.14d) route Sang neuf, at Pierrot Beach in France, becoming the first woman in history to do an FFA at that grade. She then did the FFA of Sweet Neuf (links Sang Neuf with the 25-metere second pitch of Home Sweet Home), and proposed a 9a+ (5.15a) rating, which in June 2019 was confirmed by Cédric Lachat on repeating Sweet Neuf. Her ascent of Sweef Neuf made her the second-ever woman in history to climb a 9a+ route (Margo Hayes was first), and the first-ever woman in history to do the FA of a 9a+ route.

In December 2017, Verhoven did the FFA of the 9a/9a+ route Ciudad de Dios pa la Enmienda in Spain, making her the first-ever female to do an FFA of a 9a, a 9a/+ or a 9a+ route (Angela Eiter did the first-ever female FFA of a 9b route). In November 2019, she climbed her second 9a+, Joe Mama, in Spain. In June 2020, Verhoeven made the FFA of Kraftio, a route that was bolted 15 years earlier but had repelled all attempts to scale it; Verhoeven graded it 8c+/9a making it Belgium's hardest-ever sport climbing route, which she named in memory of the former Belgian climber Chloé Graftiaux.

In May 2024, Verhoeven became fourth-ever female to redpoint a 9b (5.15b) graded route with her ascent of La Planta de Shiva at Villanueva del Rosario in Spain.

== Personal life ==
Christian faith is an important part of Verhoeven's life, which she said was not just inherited or copied from her parents, but a personal faith.

== Rankings ==
=== Climbing World Cup ===
Discipline	2012	2013	2014	2015	2016	2017	2018
Lead	34	9	4	4	2	3	11
Combined	-	-	-	-	-	7	-

=== Climbing World Championships ===
Youth

Discipline	2010 Youth B	2011 Youth B	2012 Youth A	2013 Youth A	2015 Juniors
Lead	2	4	2	2	1

Adult

Discipline	2012	2014	2016	2018
Lead	22	6	2	6

=== Climbing European Championships ===
Youth

Discipline	2012 Youth A	2013 Youth A	2014 Juniors	2015 Juniors
Lead	3	2	1	2

Adult

Discipline	2013	2015	2017
Lead	19	4	1

== Number of medals in the Climbing European Youth Cup ==
=== Lead ===
Season	Category	Gold	Silver	Bronze	Total
2011	Youth B	5			5
2012	Youth A	3	2		5
2013	Youth A	1	1		2
2014	Juniors	1			1
Total		10	3	0	13

== Number of medals in the Climbing World Cup ==
=== Lead ===
Season	Gold	Silver	Bronze	Total
2014		2	2	4
2015		1	3	4
2016	2	3		5
2017	1	1	2	4
2018			2	2
Total	3	7	9	19

== Notable ascents ==
=== Redpointed routes ===
9b (5.15b):

- La Planta de Shiva – Villanueva del Rosario, Spain – 15 May 2024. The fourth-ever repeat of a 9b graded route by a female.

9a+ (5.15a):

- No Pain No Gain – Rodellar, Spain – 25 October 2022. First female free ascent (FFFA).
- Joe Mama – Oliana, Spain – 7 November 2019. First female free ascent (FFFA).
- Sweet Neuf – Pierrot Beach, France – 11 September 2017 – First free ascent (FFA); second-ever woman in history to climb at 9a (5.14d) and first-ever woman in history to create a new 9a+ (5.15a) graded sport climbing route.

9a/9a+ :

- Patxitxulo, in Oliana, Spain – 9 October 2021. First female free ascent (FFFA).
- Ciudad de Dios pa la Enmienda – Santa Linya, Spain – 10 December 2017. First free ascent (FFA); first-ever woman in history to create (i.e. an FFA) a new 9a/9a+ graded sport climbing route.

9a (5.14d):

- Esclatamasters – Perles, Spain – January 2022 – Verhoeven climbed the route twice on the same day.
- Joe Cita – Oliana, Spain – December, 2021.
- La prophétie des grenouilles – Rocher des Brumes, France – July, 2021.
- Sang Neuf – Pierrot Beach, France – 4 September 2017 – FFA, and first-ever creation of a new 9a route by a female in history.
- Era Vella – Margalef, Spain – April, 2015. Verhoeven's first 9a.

8c+/9a :

- Kraftio, Belgium – 4 June 2020 – First ascent and Belgium's hardest climbing route at the time; named in memory of Chloé Graftiaux.

== See also ==
- List of first ascents (sport climbing)
- Muriel Sarkany, Belgian female rock climber
- Josune Bereziartu, Spanish female rock climber
