= Julia Chanourdie =

French professional rock climber

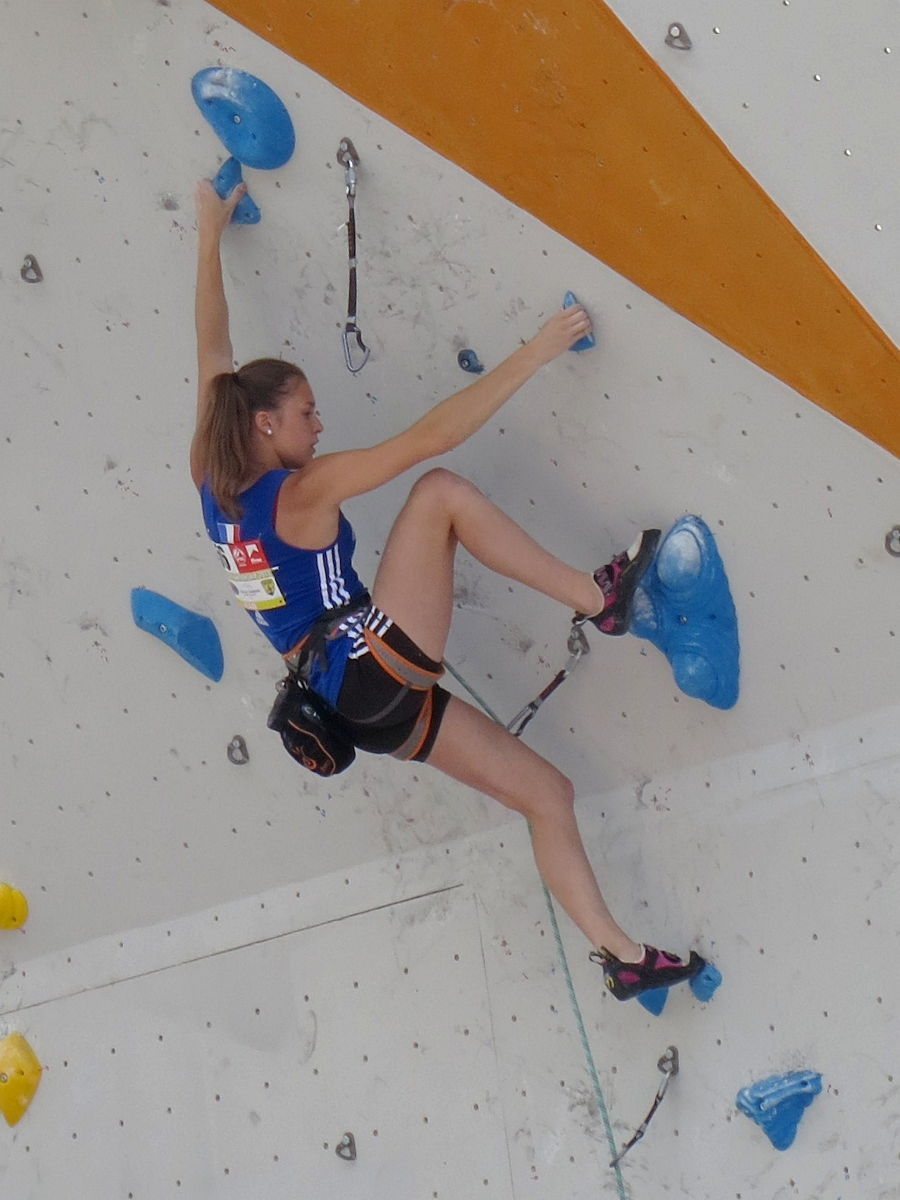

Personal information
- Nationality: French
- Born: 25 June 1996 (age 30) France
- Occupation: Professional rock climber
- Height: 163 cm (5 ft 4 in)
- Weight: 52 kg (115 lb)

Climbing career
- Type of climber: Competition climbing; Sport climbing; Bouldering
- Highest grade: Redpoint: 9b (5.15b); Onsight/Flash: 8b (5.13d)
- Known for: Second-ever female to climb at 9b (5.15b)
Medal record
Women's competition climbing
Representing France
World Youth Championships
| Bronze medal – third place | 2013 | Lead |
| Bronze medal – third place | 2014 | Lead |
| Bronze medal – third place | 2015 | Lead |
European Youth Championships
| Bronze medal – third place | 2014 | Lead |
Rock Masters
| Gold medal – first place | 2017 | Duel |
French Championships
| Bronze medal – third place | 2012 | Lead |
| Bronze medal – third place | 2013 | Lead |
| Silver medal – second place | 2015 | Lead |
| Silver medal – second place | 2016 | Lead |
| Silver medal – second place | 2017 | Lead |
| Silver medal – second place | 2017 | Bouldering |
World Games
| Bronze medal – third place | 2017 Wrocław | Lead |
- Updated on 30 July 2023

Julia Chanourdie (born 25 June 1996) is a French professional rock climber who specialises in competition lead climbing. She also climbs outdoors as a sport climber, and on 7 November 2020, she became the second-ever female in history to climb a 9b (5.15b) route, Eagle–4 in Saint-Léger-du-Ventoux, France. Chanourdie won the bronze medal at The World Games 2017 in Wrocław, Poland.

== Notable ascents ==
=== Redpoint ===
- 9b (5.15b)
  - Eagle–4, Saint-Léger-du-Ventoux, 7 November 2020, second-ever female in history to climb 9b (after Angela Eiter)
- 9a+ (5.15a)
  - Super Crackinette, Saint-Léger-du-Ventoux, 13 March 2020; became the fourth-ever female to climb above the grade of 5.15a (9a+).
- 9a (5.14d)
  - Ground Zero, Tetto di Sarre, 25 March 2017
  - Molasse'son, Mollans, 5 April 2018

== Rankings ==
=== Climbing World Cup ===
| Discipline | 2012 | 2013 | 2014 | 2015 | 2016 | 2017 | 2018 | 2019 |
|---|---|---|---|---|---|---|---|---|
| Lead | 53 | 49 | 23 | 11 | 8 | 5 | 28 | 17 |
| Bouldering | - | - | - | - | - | - | 78 | 9 |
| Speed | - | - | - | - | - | - | - | 47 |
| Combined | - | - | - | - | - | 11 | unk.^{[A]} | unk.^{[A]} |

^{A} No total available as of 2 Mar 2021.

=== Climbing World Championships ===
Youth

| Discipline | 2010 Youth B | 2011 Youth B | 2012 Youth A | 2013 Youth A | 2014 Junior | 2015 Junior |
|---|---|---|---|---|---|---|
| Lead | 5 | 5 | 12 | 3 | 3 | 3 |

Adult

| Discipline | 2012 | 2014 | 2016 |
|---|---|---|---|
| Lead | 25 | - | 6 |
| Bouldering | - | - | - |
| Speed | - | - | - |

=== Climbing European Championships ===
Youth

| Discipline | 2012 Youth A | 2013 Youth A | 2014 Junior | 2015 Junior |
|---|---|---|---|---|
| Lead | 5 | 4 | 3 | 6 |

Adult

| Discipline | 2013 | 2015 | 2017 |
|---|---|---|---|
| Lead | 15 | 16 | 9 |
| Bouldering | - | - | - |
| Speed | - | - | - |

=== Rock Masters ===
| Discipline | 2017 |
|---|---|
| Duel | 1 |

== Number of medals in the Climbing World Cup ==
=== Lead ===
| Season | Gold | Silver | Bronze | Total |
|---|---|---|---|---|
| 2017 | | | 1 | 1 |
| Total | 0 | 0 | 1 | 1 |

== See also ==
- History of rock climbing
- List of first ascents (sport climbing)
