= Fedir Samoilov =

Ukrainian rock climber

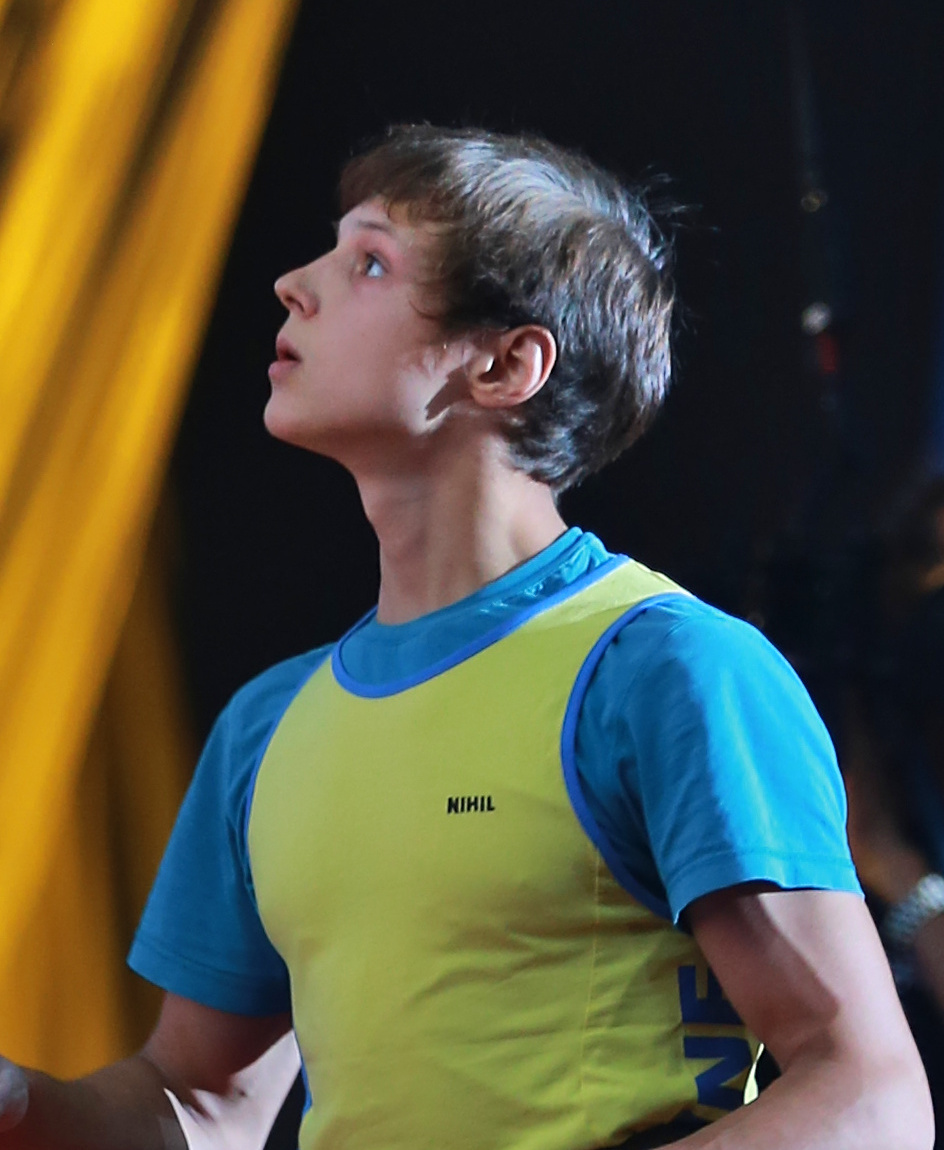
- Samoilov in 2018

Sport
- Country: Ukraine
- Sport: Competition climbing
Medal record
Men's competition climbing
Representing Ukraine
World Championships
| Bronze medal – third place | 2021 Moscow | Combined |

Fedir Samoilov is a Ukrainian rock climber who specializes in competition climbing. He participated at the 2021 IFSC Climbing World Championships, being awarded the bronze medal in the men's combined event. Samoilov was one of the finalists at the World University Climbing Championships in 2018.

== See also ==
- List of grade milestones in rock climbing
- History of rock climbing
- Rankings of most career IFSC gold medals
