= Jain Kim =

South Korean rock climber (born 1988)

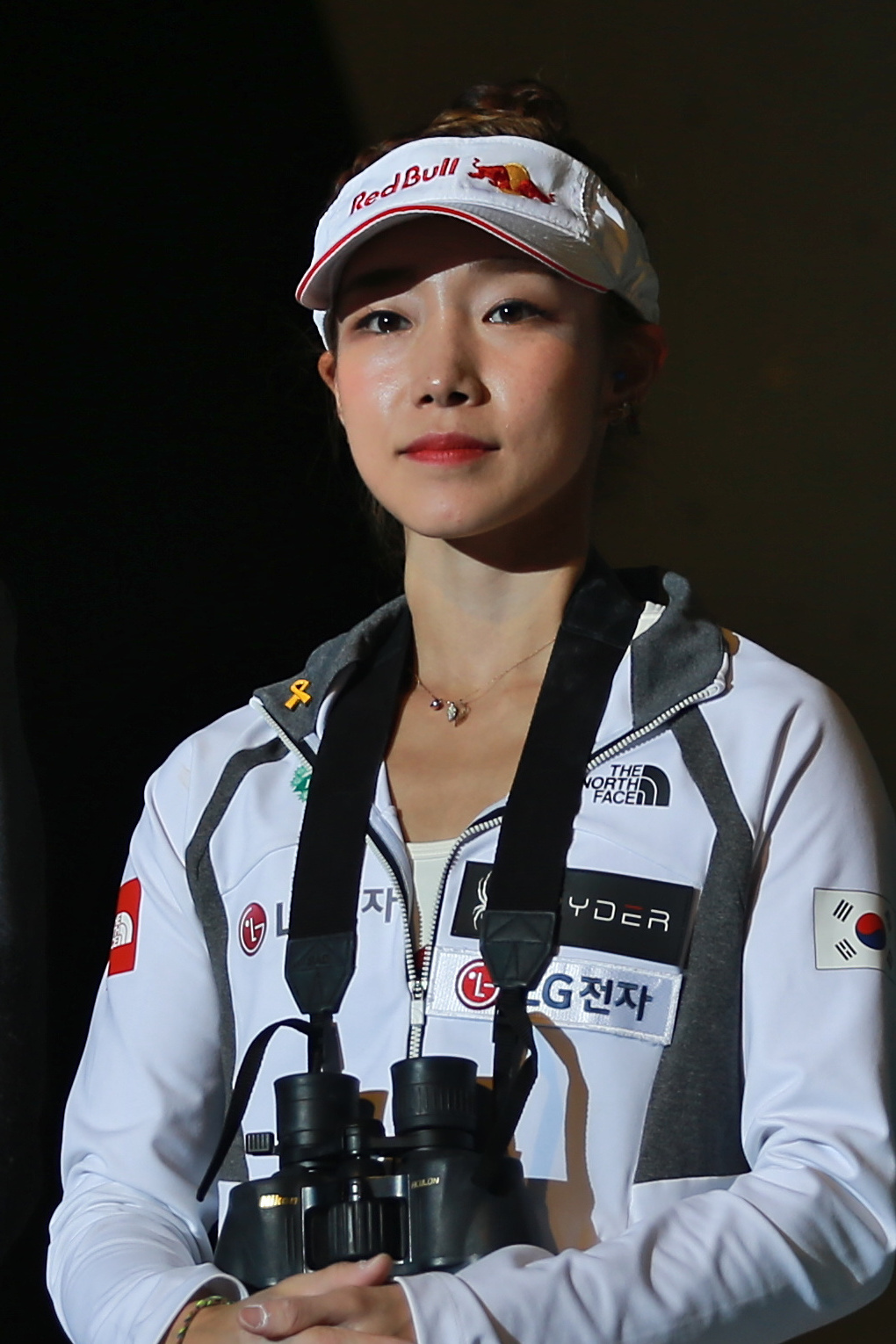
- Kim in 2018

Personal information
- Born: 11 September 1988 (age 37) Goyang, South Korea
- Height: 153 cm (5 ft 0 in)
- Weight: 42 kg (93 lb)
- Spouse: Oh Young-hwan
- Website: jainkim.kr

Climbing career
- Type of climber: Competition climbing; Sport climbing; Bouldering
- Highest grade: Redpoint: 8c/8c+
Medal record
Women's competition climbing
Representing South Korea
Event	1st	2nd	3rd
World Cups	31	14	17
World Championships	2	3	1
Asian Championships	14	3	3
World Championships
Gold medal – first place	2012 Paris	Combined
Gold medal – first place	2014 Gijón	Lead
Silver medal – second place	2009 Xining	Lead
Silver medal – second place	2011 Arco	Lead
Silver medal – second place	2012 Paris	Lead
Bronze medal – third place	2018 Innsbruck	Lead
World Cup
Second place	2009	Lead
Winner	2010	Lead
Winner	2010	Combined
Second place	2011	Lead
Second place	2012	Lead
Winner	2013	Lead
Winner	2014	Lead
Second place	2015	Lead
Winner	2015	Combined
Third place	2016	Lead
Second place	2017	Lead
Second place	2017	Combined
Third place	2018	Lead
World Games
Silver medal – second place	2009	Lead
Silver medal – second place	2013	Lead
- Updated on May 4, 2019

Jain Kim (Korean: 김자인, born 11 September 1988) is a professional climber who specializes in competition climbing. She is mainly active in competition lead climbing and competition bouldering. She has won the Lead Climbing World Cup three times (2010, 2013, 2014), the Lead Climbing World Championship once (2014), and the Rock Master once (2010, Lead discipline). She has won the Asian Championships 14 times in 15 years, 11 times in lead climbing and 3 times in bouldering (see below for details).

Kim has also completed notable sport climbing routes. In 2014, she redpointed her first routes graded above the 8b+ (5.14a) grade, including Bibita Biologica 8c (5.14b) and Reini's Vibes 8c+ (5.14c), both in Arco, Italy.

== Early life ==
Born into a family of mountaineers and climbers, Kim started climbing at age 12. In July 2004, at age 15, she started competing in the Lead Climbing World Cup and since 2006, she has also participated in the Bouldering World Cup.

== Climbing career ==
=== Competition climbing ===
She won the Lead Climbing Asian Championship in 2004, 2005, 2006, 2008, 2009, and 2010. In 2008, she also won the Bouldering Asian Championship. In 2009, she ranked second in the Lead Climbing World Cup, second in the Lead Climbing World Championship, second in the World Games (Lead), and third in the Rock Master (Lead).

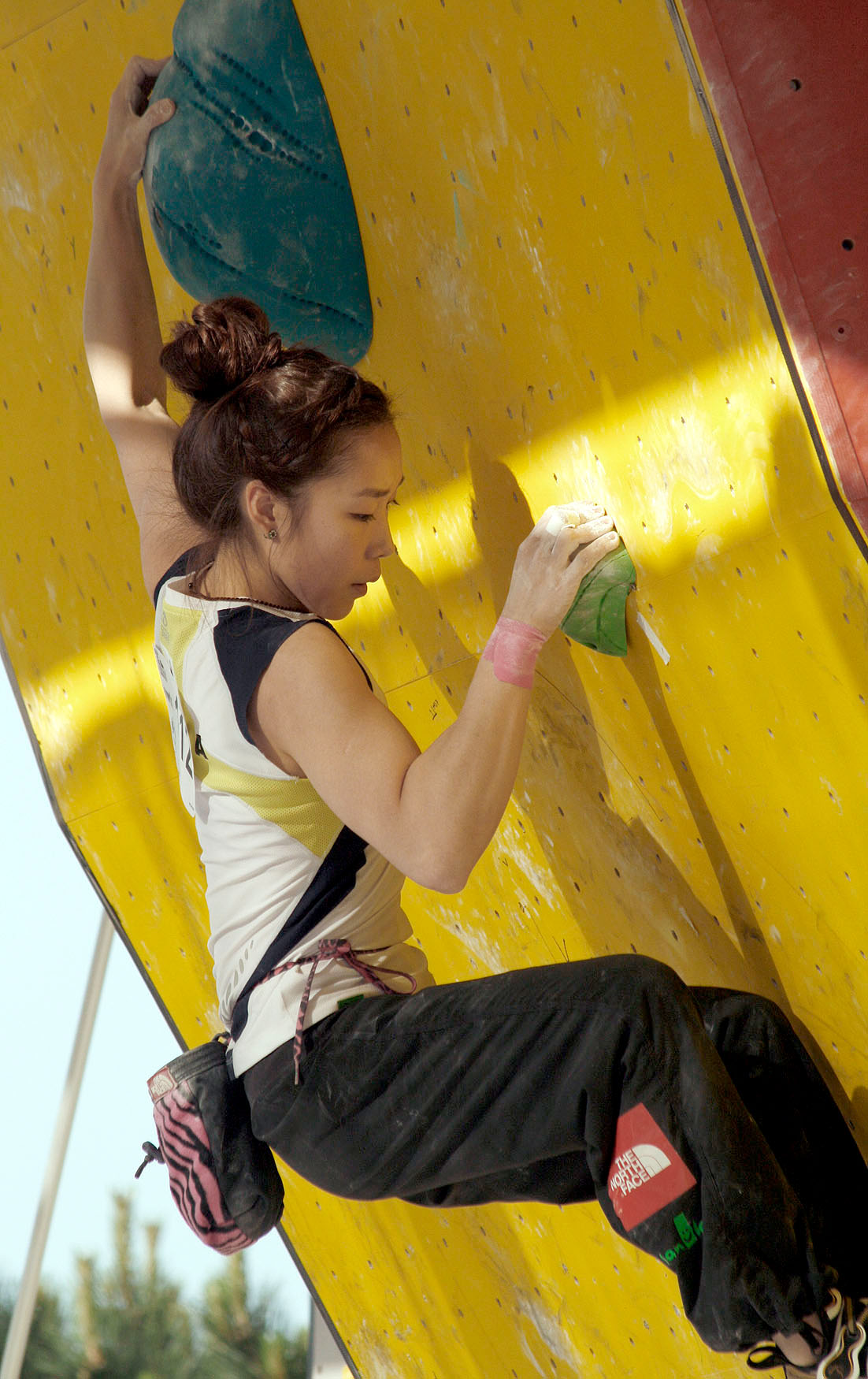
Kim in the Bouldering World Cup, Vienna, 2010

In 2010, she won the competition lead climbing events both in the Rock Master and the World Cup. She obtained the World Cup overall title by ranking first in five of the six stages, namely those held in Xining, Chuncheon, Puurs, Huaiji, and Kranj. The only World Cup stage that Jain Kim did not win in 2010 was the first one, held in Chamonix. She won the Lead Climbing World Cup again in 2013 and 2014, each time winning four of the eight events.

On September 14, 2014, she onsighted every route in the lead climbing event at the 2014 IFSC Climbing World Championships on her way to winning; the qualifications, the semifinals, and the final rounds.

Kim won the Lead World Cup in Chamonix on July 9, 2023, becoming the oldest woman to win a Lead World Cup at 34 years old.

=== Rock climbing ===
In May and June 2014, she redpointed her first sport climbing routes on outdoor rock above the 8b+ (5.14a) climbing grade, namely Bibita Biologica 8c (5.14b) and Reini's Vibes (8c/8c+), both in Arco, Italy.

In 2016 she flashed China Climb 8c (5.14b) in Yangshou, China.

On May 20, 2017, she climbed the 555-meter Lotte World Tower in Seoul.

== Personal life ==
She is married to Oh Young-hwan, a member of the 21st National Assembly of Korea, who was a firefighter of Seoul Fire Services and writer. On March 10, 2021, Kim gave birth to a daughter.

== Rankings ==
=== Climbing World Cup ===
Discipline	2004	2005	2006	2007	2008	2009	2010	2011	2012	2013	2014	2015	2016	2017	2018	2019	2023	2024	2025	2026
Lead	25	18	28	14	18	2	1	2	2	1	1	2	3	2	3	8	6	23	31	8
Bouldering	–	–	36	–	51	5	12	7	10	29	–	–	–	18	48	35	51	71	–	–
Speed	–	–	–	–	–	–	–	–	–	–	–	30	–	–	75	–	–	–	–	–
Combined	–	–	21	–	25	2	1	2	2	4	–	1	–	2	8	8	–	–	–	–

=== Climbing World Championships ===
Youth

Discipline	2005 Youth A
Lead	22

Adult

Discipline	2005	2007	2009	2011	2012	2014	2016	2018	2019	2023	2025
Lead	32	8	2	2	2	1	4	3	22	13	23
Bouldering	12	45	17	11	5	–	–	41	25	45	–
Speed	–	–	–	–	41	–	–	54	59	–	–
Combined	–	–	–	–	1	–	–	–	40	5	–

=== World Games ===
Discipline	2005	2009	2013	2017
Lead	5	2	2	4

=== Rock Master ===
Discipline	2009	2010	2011	2012	2013
Lead	3	1	–	–	2
Duel	–	–	5	–	3

=== Asian Championships ===
Discipline	2004	2005	2006	2007	2008	2009	2010	2012	2013	2014	2015	2016	2017	2018	2022
Lead	1	1	1	1	1	1	1	1	–	1	1	3	–	1	3
Bouldering	–	–	2	1	1	2	2	1	–	–	3	–	–	–	–

== World Cup podiums ==
=== Lead ===
Last updated July 9, 2023.

Season	Gold	Silver	Bronze	Total
2007			1	1
2008				0
2009	1	2		3
2010	5			5
2011	5	1	1	7
2012	3	2	1	6
2013	4	2	1	7
2014	4	2		6
2015	3			3
2016		1	4	5
2017	1	3	2	6
2018	2		2	4
2019	1		1	2
2023	1			1
Total	30	13	13	56

=== Bouldering ===
Season	Gold	Silver	Bronze	Total
2009		1		1
2010			2	2
2011	1		1	2
2012			1	1
Total	1	1	4	6

== Television ==
Year	Program	Original title	Network	Role	Note	Ref.
2015	Running Man	런닝맨	SBS	Guest	Episode 268	
2021	Sporty Sisters 2	노는언니2	E Channel	Member		

== See also ==
- List of grade milestones in rock climbing
- History of rock climbing
- Rankings of most career IFSC gold medals
