= Romain Desgranges =

French rock climber

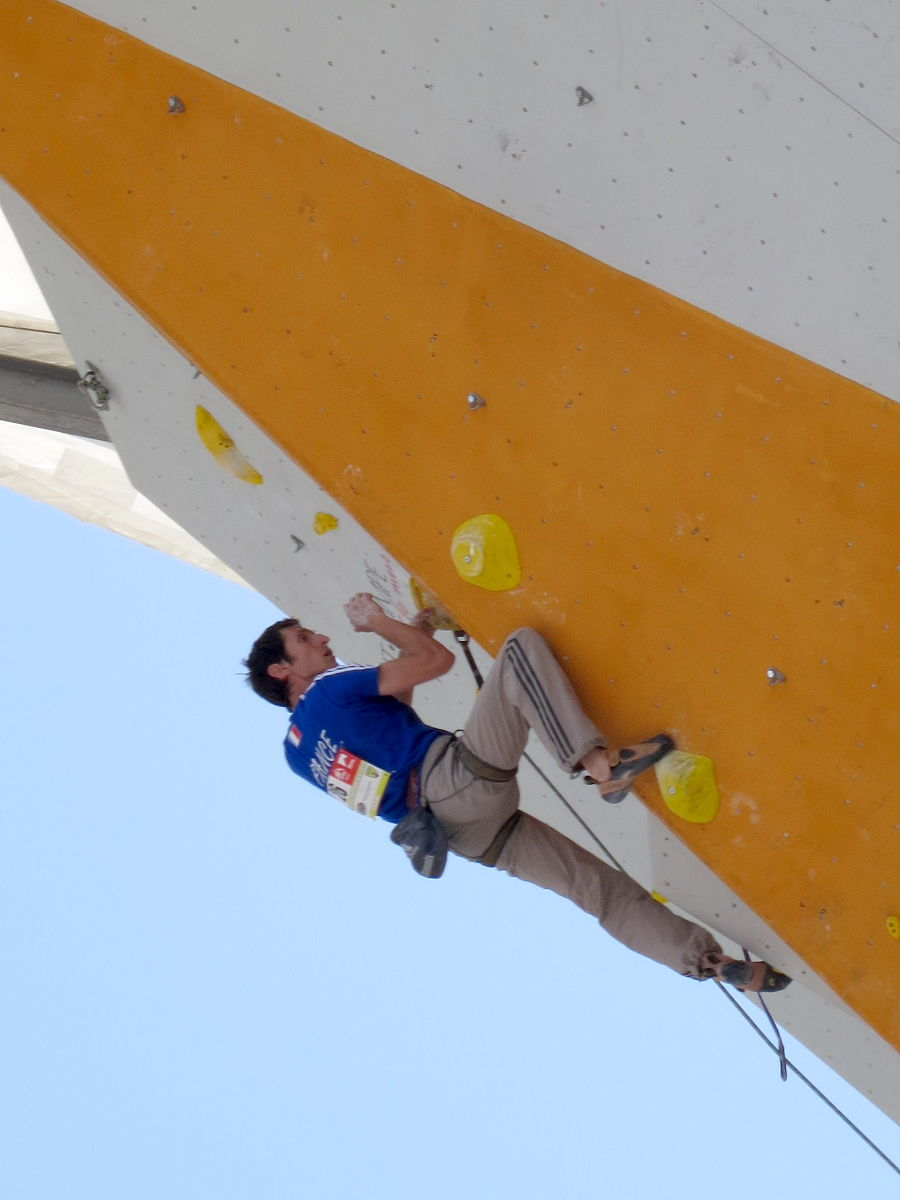
- Romain Desgranges at the Climbing European Championships, Chamonix, 2013

Personal information
- Nationality: French
- Born: October 12, 1982 (age 43) Sainte-Colombe, France
- Occupation: Professional rock climber
- Height: 174 cm (5 ft 9 in)
- Weight: 56 kg (123 lb)
- Website: desgranges-romain.com

Climbing career
- Type of climber: Competition climbing; sport climbing; bouldering
- Highest grade: Redpoint: 9a (5.14d); Bouldering: 8C+ (V16)
- Known for: Winning the European Championships in 2013 and 2017
Medal record
European Championships
| Gold medal – first place | 2013 | Lead |
| Gold medal – first place | 2017 | Lead |
World Cup
| Third place | 2016 | Lead |
| Winner | 2017 | Lead |
| Third place | 2018 | Lead |
- Updated on October 30, 2018

Romain Desgranges, born on October 12, 1982, in Sainte-Colombe, is a French professional rock climber who specializes in competition climbing, and in outdoor sport climbing and bouldering.

== Biography ==
Romain Desgranges started climbing when he was 14 years old in his school.

In 2017, he won both the Climbing European Championships and the Climbing World Cup in the competition lead climbing discipline.

== Rankings ==
=== Climbing World Championships ===
| Discipline | 2009 | 2011 | 2012 | 2014 | 2016 |
|---|---|---|---|---|---|
| Lead | 15 | 14 | 6 | 7 | 5 |

=== Climbing European Championships ===
| Discipline | 2004 | 2006 | 2008 | 2010 | 2013 | 2015 | 2017 |
|---|---|---|---|---|---|---|---|
| Lead | 18 | - | 12 | 19 | 1 | 4 | 1 |

=== Climbing World Cup ===
| Discipline | 2003 | 2004 | 2005 | 2006 | 2007 | 2008 | 2009 | 2010 | 2011 | 2012 | 2013 | 2014 | 2015 | 2016 | 2017 | 2018 |
|---|---|---|---|---|---|---|---|---|---|---|---|---|---|---|---|---|
| Lead | 44 | 18 | 14 | 24 | 14 | 11 | 12 | 11 | 5 | 5 | 6 | 4 | 5 | 3 | 1 | 3 |
| Bouldering | 38 | - | - | - | - | - | - | - | - | - | - | - | - | - | - | - |
| Combined | 16 | - | - | - | - | - | - | - | - | - | - | - | - | - | 4 | - |

=== World Games ===
| Discipline | 2009 |
|---|---|
| Lead | 3 |

== Number of medals in the Climbing World Cup ==
=== Lead ===
Tribute from the French Federation of Mountaineering and Climbing.

| Season | Gold | Silver | Bronze | Total |
|---|---|---|---|---|
| 2011 | | | 1 | 1 |
| 2012 | | | 2 | 2 |
| 2013 | | | | 0 |
| 2014 | | 1 | 2 | 3 |
| 2015 | 1 | | 1 | 2 |
| 2016 | 1 | 1 | | 2 |
| 2017 | 3 | | | 3 |
| 2018 | 1 | 2 | | 3 |
| Total | 6 | 4 | 6 | 16 |

== Rock climbing ==
=== Boulder problems ===
8C+ (V16):

- The Kaizer Sauzé - Walid Wood (FRA) - 2011 - First ascent

8B+ (V14):

- Radja - Branson (Monthey, SUI) - November 2009
- Underground Paradise - Fionnay (SUI) - First ascent

8B (V13):

- La danse des Balrogs - Branson (Monthey, SUI) - November 2009
- Seveso - Fionnay (SUI) - September 2009 - First ascent
- Permanent Midnight - Fionnay (Switzerland) - September 2009

=== Redpointed routes ===
9a (5.14d):

- Haribal Lecter - Chamonix (FRA) - March 2011 - First ascent

- El intento - Cuenca (ESP) - April 2016

== See also ==
- List of grade milestones in rock climbing
- History of rock climbing
- Rankings of most career IFSC gold medals
- Fred Rouhling, climbing partner of Romain Desgranges
