= Janja Garnbret =

Slovenian rock climber (born 1999)

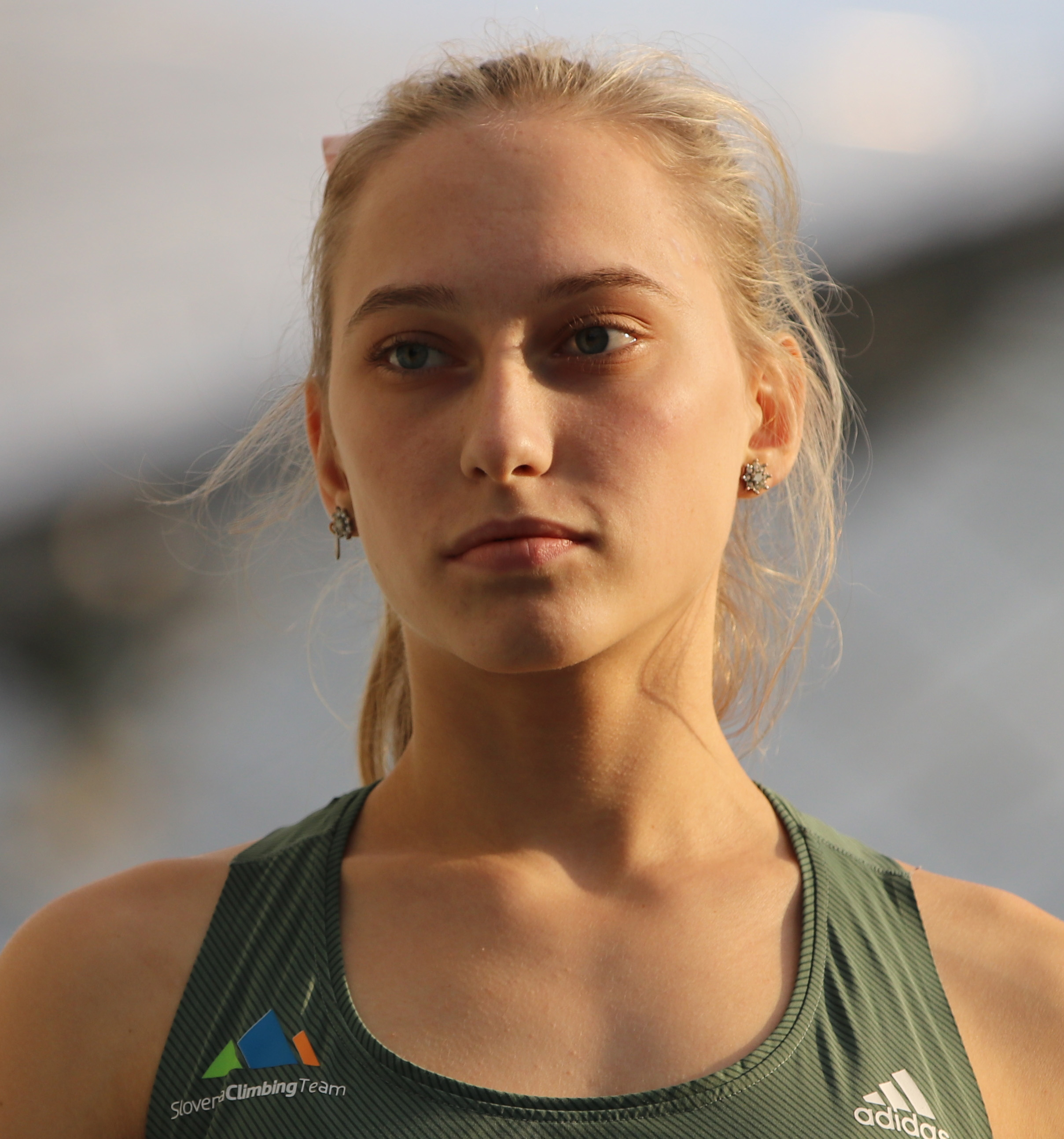
- Garnbret at the 2017 Boulder World Cup in Munich

Personal information
- Nationality: Slovenian
- Born: 12 March 1999 (age 27) Slovenj Gradec, Slovenia
- Occupation: Professional rock climber
- Height: 1.64 m (5 ft 5 in)
- Website: janja-garnbret.com

Climbing career
- Type of climber: Competition climbing; Sport climbing; bouldering
- Ape index: +7 cm (2.8 in)
- Highest grade: Redpoint: 9b+ (5.15c); Onsight/Flash: 8c (5.14b); Bouldering: V15 (8C)
- Known for: First female Olympic gold medalist in climbing; Winning 10 IFSC World Championships; Winning the most IFSC gold medals in history; First woman to onsight at 8c (5.14b); Second woman to ascend at 9b+ (5.15c)
Medal record
Women's competition climbing
Representing Slovenia
Olympic Games
Gold medal – first place	2020 Tokyo	Combined
Gold medal – first place	2024 Paris	Combined
World Championships
Gold medal – first place	2016 Paris	Lead
Gold medal – first place	2018 Innsbruck	Bouldering
Gold medal – first place	2018 Innsbruck	Combined
Gold medal – first place	2019 Hachiōji	Lead
Gold medal – first place	2019 Hachiōji	Bouldering
Gold medal – first place	2019 Hachiōji	Combined
Gold medal – first place	2023 Bern	Bouldering
Gold medal – first place	2023 Bern	Combined
Gold medal – first place	2025 Seoul	Lead
Gold medal – first place	2025 Seoul	Bouldering
Silver medal – second place	2018 Innsbruck	Lead
Silver medal – second place	2023 Bern	Lead
World Games
Silver medal – second place	2017 Wrocław	Lead
European Championships
Gold medal – first place	2017 Munich	Combined
Gold medal – first place	2022 Munich	Lead
Gold medal – first place	2022 Munich	Bouldering
Gold medal – first place	2022 Munich	Combined
Silver medal – second place	2015 Chamonix	Lead
Silver medal – second place	2017 Munich	Bouldering
- Updated on 5 September 2026

Janja Garnbret (born 12 March 1999) is a Slovenian professional rock climber who specializes in sport climbing and competition climbing. She has won multiple competition lead climbing and competition bouldering events, two Olympic gold medals, and is widely regarded as the greatest competition climber of all time. In 2021, Garnbret became the first female Olympic gold medalist in climbing, and defended her title in 2024. With two gold medals, she is the most successful Slovenian athlete at the Summer Olympics. She is also the first female to onsight an 8c (5.14b) graded route, and the second female to ascend a 9b+ (5.15c) graded route.

Garnbret won her first international title at the 2014 World Youth B Championships in lead. In July 2015, after turning 16, she entered the senior category of the IFSC Climbing World Cup in lead climbing. In 2016, aged 17, Garnbret won the World Cup seasonal titles in lead and combined, World Championships in lead climbing, and World Youth A Championships in both lead climbing and bouldering. From 2016 to 2018, she was awarded the seasonal title in both lead climbing and combined disciplines. In both 2018 and 2019, she won the World Championships in bouldering and combined and also reclaimed the lead title in 2019. The same year, Garnbret became the first athlete to win all bouldering World Cup events in a season.

As of November 2026, Garnbret has won the most IFSC gold medals of any competitive climber in history. In the lead discipline of the World Climbing Series, she has missed the podium only on four occasions, winning 34 times. In addition, she has also won 18 events in bouldering for a total of 52 victories in the World Climbing Series.

== Early life ==
Garnbret started climbing at the age of seven and first competed in the national competition at the age of eight. She won her first major competition at the 2013 European Youth Championships, where she won in bouldering.

== Climbing career ==
=== Competition climbing ===
In 2015, her first year of eligibility for the IFSC Climbing World Cup, she placed seventh in the overall lead climbing standings. The same year, she also placed first in a Swedish bouldering event, the "La Sportiva Legends Only", ahead of Shauna Coxsey, Mélissa Le Nevé, Juliane Wurm, and Anna Stöhr. She also won the bouldering gathering Melloblocco in 2015.

In 2016, she won most of the IFSC competitions in which she participated. She won the World Cup in lead and combined (Note: The combined discipline included results from lead, bouldering, and speed.) disciplines, the World Championships in lead, and the World Youth Championships in lead and bouldering. Garnbret also won the Adidas Rockstars 2016 contest (an invitational contest for the world's best bouldering athletes), defeating Jessica Pilz in the superfinal. She also won Rock Master in 2016, and then again in 2018.

In 2017, she won the World Cup in lead and combined disciplines, the combined title in the European Championships, and ranked second in bouldering in the World Cup and the European Championships.

In 2018, she defended her World Cup titles in lead and combined disciplines and placed fourth in bouldering by winning two golds and one silver, after participating in just 3 out of 7 events (due to school commitments). Moreover, she won the World Championships in both bouldering and combined. She was close to also winning the Lead Climbing World Championships, where she earned the silver medal by topping the final route in 4 minutes and 38 seconds, just 11 seconds slower than Jessica Pilz, who won the Championship.

In 2019, she dominated the bouldering World Cup by solving 74 problems out of 78 and winning every event throughout the season. Throughout six events, she placed first in six qualifications, four semifinals and six finals. This feat had never been achieved before in the history of competition climbing. The same year, Garnbret won three out of four disciplines at the 2019 IFSC Climbing World Championships, taking gold in lead, bouldering, and combined. Her win in the combined event qualified her for a spot at the 2020 Summer Olympics. Towards the end of 2019, she hired Roman Krajnik as her personal coach.

In 2021, she began the 2021 IFSC Climbing World Cup season with a win in bouldering at Meiringen in April before finishing second in Salt Lake City, ending her streak of bouldering World Cup wins at nine. In the same year, she became the first female Olympic champion in sport climbing, taking gold in the inaugural women's combined event at the 2020 Summer Olympics.

In April 2022, after her first bouldering World Cup victory in the 2022 IFSC Climbing World Cup season at Meiringen, Garnbret announced that she would skip the remaining bouldering events to focus on the European Championships and the lead events of the World Cup. At the 2022 European Championships in Munich, Garnbret won gold in all three events in which she competed – lead, bouldering and combined. (Note: After the 2020 Olympics, the combined event included just lead and bouldering, with speed separated out.)

In August 2023, Garnbret qualified for the combined event at the 2024 Olympics by winning the combined title in the 2023 World Championship. She also won the gold medal in the individual boulder event and the silver medal in the individual lead event, bringing her World Championship medal tally to ten, including eight gold.

In August 2024, she defended her Olympic gold after winning the boulder and lead combined event at the 2024 Olympics for her second Olympic victory.

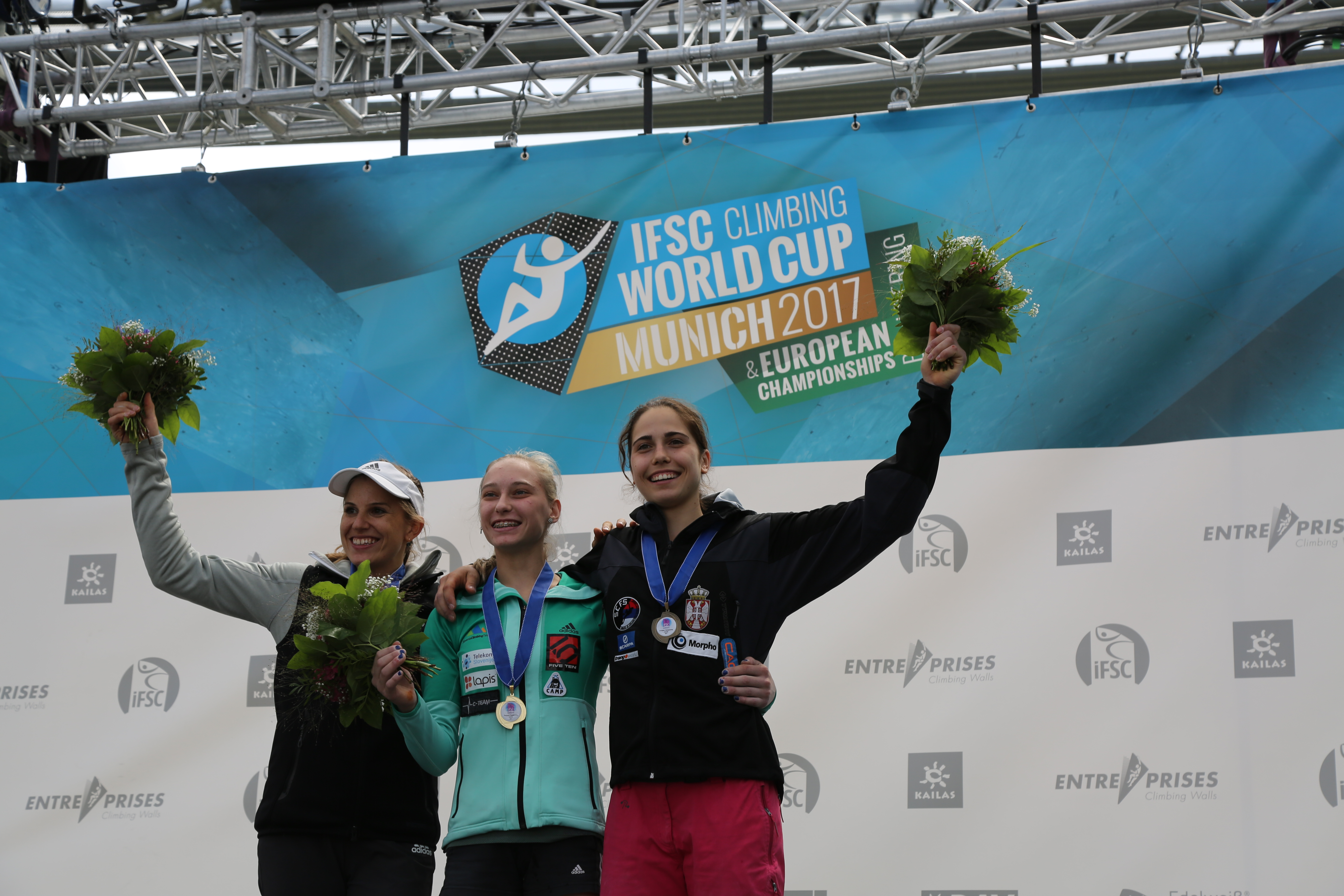
Garnbret as the 2017 European champion in combined discipline

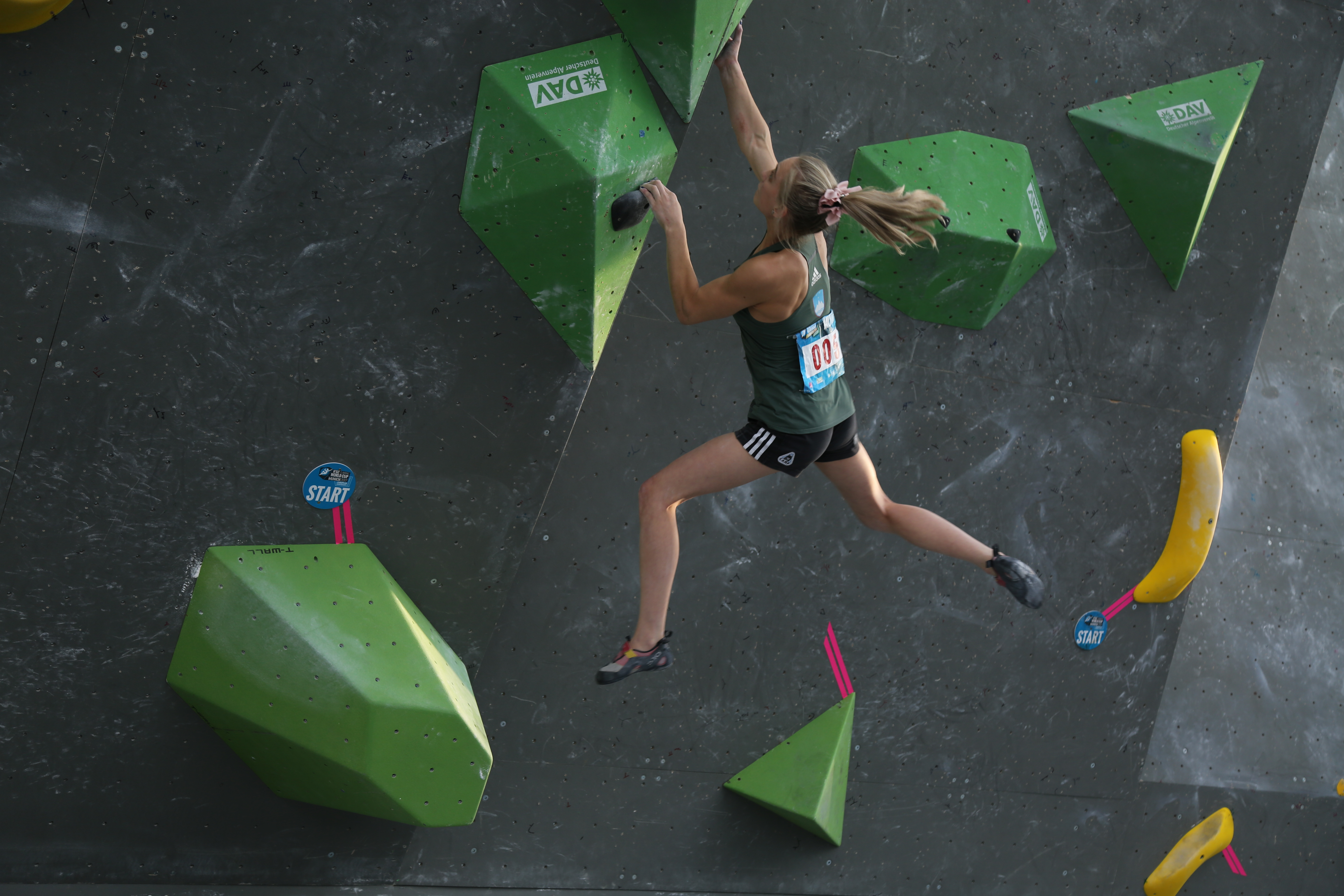
Garnbret bouldering at the 2017 IFSC Climbing World Cup in Munich, Germany, 2017

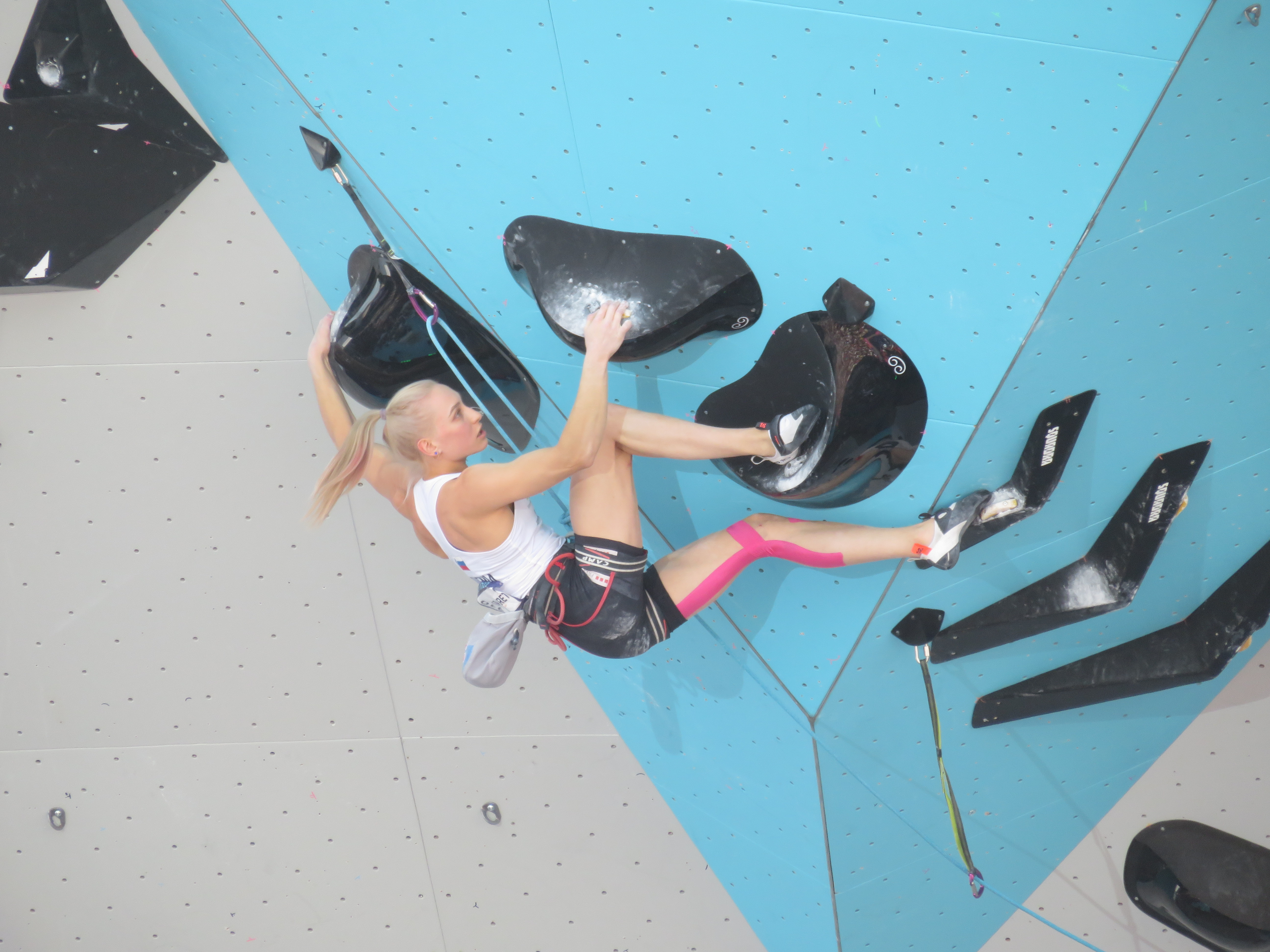
Garnbret lead climbing at the European Championships Munich 2022

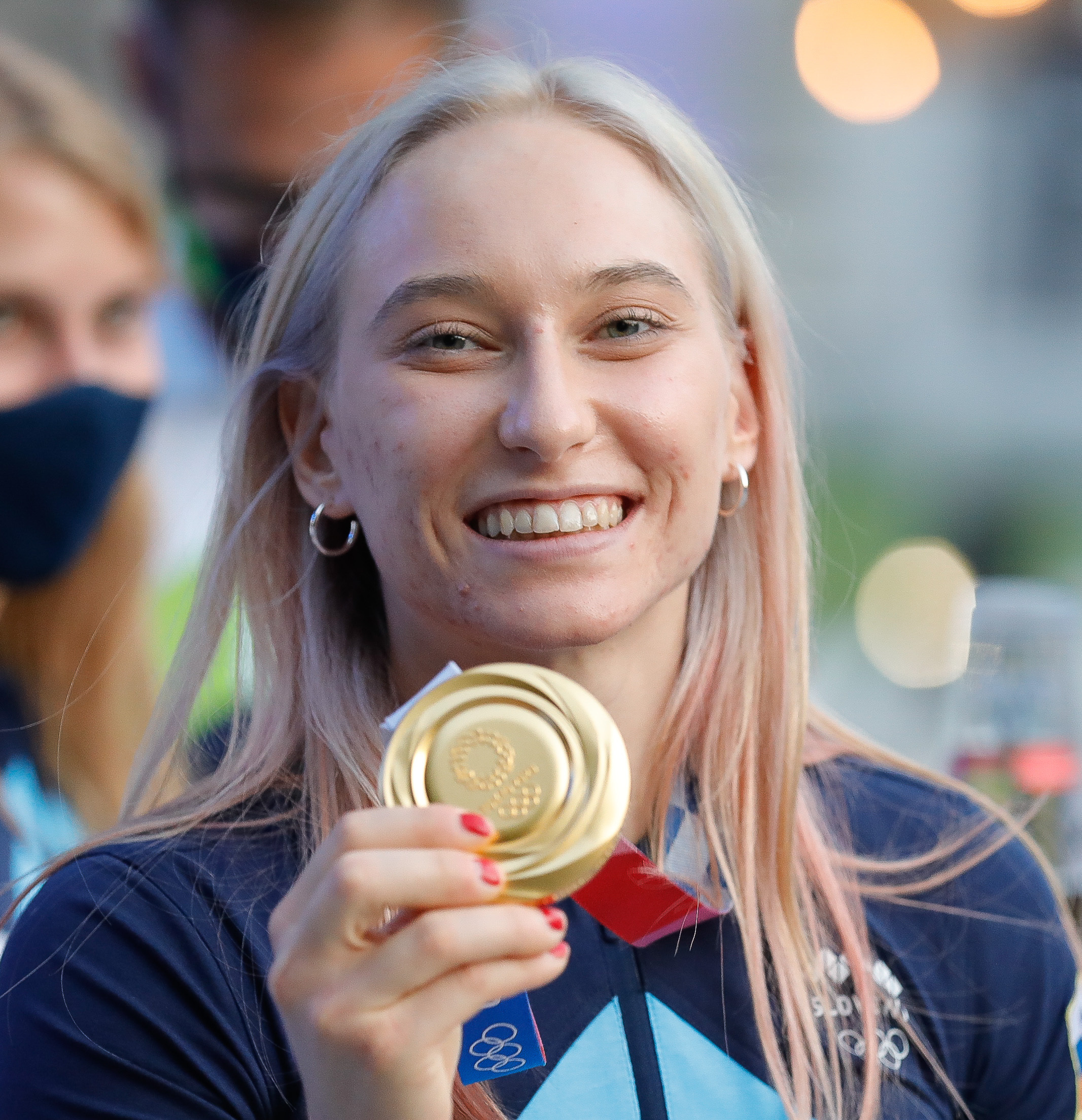
Garnbret with the gold medal from the 2020 Summer Olympics

=== Outdoor rock climbing ===
In 2015, Garnbret onsighted Avatar, an 8b (5.13d) graded sport climbing route in Pandora, Croatia. The same year, she climbed her first 8c+ (5.14c) graded route by redpointing Miza za šest at Kotečnik in her home country of Slovenia.

In 2016, she flashed La Fabelita in Santa Linya, an 8c (5.14b) graded sport climbing route. She was given route beta by her countrywoman Mina Markovič, and climbed the route in less than 15 minutes.

In 2017, she climbed two 9a (5.14d) graded sport routes, Seleccio Natural and La Fabela pa la Enmienda over a couple of days in Santa Linya, Spain, her first of the grade.

In November 2021, she onsighted Fish Eye in Oliana, Spain, which was the first female onsight of a consensus 8c (5.14b) graded sport route.

In March 2022, Garnbret made the first female free ascent (FFFA) of Bügeleisen, an 8B+ (V14) graded bouldering problem in Maltatal, Austria. On 12 May 2024, she returned to Maltatal and made the first female ascent of Bügeleisen SDS, a sit start variation that is graded at 8C (V15).

In June 2026, she made the FFFA of Bibliographie in Céüse, making her only the second-ever woman, and the thirteenth person to climb the grade of 9b+ (5.15c).

== Rankings ==
=== World Climbing Series ===
The competition was known as the IFSC Climbing World Cup before 2026.

Discipline	2015	2016	2017	2018	2019	2021	2022	2023	2024	2025	2026
Lead	7	1	1	1	2	1	1	2	2	7	2
Bouldering	—	17	2	4	1	2	18	8	5	18	21
Speed	—	—	—	58	48	12	—	—	—	—	—
Combined	—	1	1	1	1	—	—	—	—	—	—

=== Climbing World Championships ===
Youth

Discipline	2013 Youth B	2014 Youth B	2015 Youth A	2016 Youth A
Lead	4	1	1	1
Bouldering	—	—	1	1
Speed	—	—	23	28
Combined	—	—	2	2

Senior

Discipline	2016	2018	2019	2023	2025
Lead	1	2	1	2	1
Bouldering	—	1	1	1	1
Speed	—	47	23	—	—
Combined	—	1	1	1	—

=== Climbing European Championships ===
Youth

Discipline	2013 Youth B	2014 Youth B	2015 Youth A
Lead	1	1	1
Bouldering	1	1	1

Senior

Discipline	2015	2017	2022
Lead	2	4	1
Bouldering	—	2	1
Speed	—	32	—
Combined	—	1	1

== World Climbing Series podiums ==
As of October 2026, Garnbret has won 52 World Climbing Series events and has a total of 74 podium finishes.

=== Lead ===
Season	Gold	Silver	Bronze	Total
2015		2	1	3
2016	4		2	6
2017	6		2	8
2018	4	3		7
2019	1	2		3
2020		1		1
2021	3			3
2022	5	2		7
2023	3			3
2024	3			3
2025	2			2
2026	3	1		4
Total	34	11	5	50

=== Bouldering ===
Season	Gold	Silver	Bronze	Total
2016		1		1
2017	3	1		4
2018	2	1		3
2019	6			6
2021	2	1		3
2022	1			1
2023	1	1		2
2024	2			2
2025	1			1
2026		1		1
Total	18	6	0	24
