= Speed climbing at the 2017 IFSC Climbing World Cup =

- Location: Chongqing, China Nanjing, China; Villars, Switzerland; Arco, Italy; Edinburgh, United Kingdom; Wujiang, China Xiamen, China
- Dates: 22 April – 15 October 2017

Champions
- Men: (Russia) Vladislav Deulin
- Women: (France) Anouck Jaubert

Speed climbing competitions at the 2017 IFSC Climbing World Cup were being held at seven stops. The winners were awarded trophies, and the best three finishers received medals.

At the World Cup in Nanjing, Reza Alipour of Iran and Russia's Iuliia Kaplina set world records on their way to the men's and women's speed titles of 5.48 and 7.38 seconds respectively.

At the end of the season an overall ranking was determined based upon points, which athletes were awarded for finishing in the top 30 of each individual event. Vladislav Deulin won the men's seasonal title, Anouck Jaubert won the women's seasonal title, and Russian Federation won the national team title.

== Overall Ranking ==
An overall ranking was determined based upon points, which athletes were awarded for finishing in the top 30 of each individual event.

=== Men ===
6 best competition results were counted (not counting points in brackets) for IFSC Climbing World Cup 2017. Vladislav Deulin won.

| Rank | Name | Points | Xiamen | Wujiang | Edinburgh | Arco | Villars | Nanjing | Chongqing |
|---|---|---|---|---|---|---|---|---|---|
| 1 | (Russia) Vladislav Deulin | 470.00 | 1. 100.00 | 8. 40.00 | 8. (40.00) | 1. 100.00 | 3. 65.00 | 3. 65.00 | 1. 100.00 |
| 2 | (Iran) Reza Alipour | 351.00 | 12. 28.00 | - | - | 2. 80.00 | 1. 100.00 | 1. 100.00 | 7. 43.00 |
| 3 | (Italy) Ludovico Fossali | 346.00 | 4. 55.00 | 9. 37.00 | 1. 100.00 | 3. 65.00 | 4. 55.00 | 10. 34.00 | 16. (20.00) |
| 4 | (Russia) Aleksandr Shikov | 338.00 | 14. (24.00) | 1. 100.00 | 4. 55.00 | 13. 26.00 | 13. 26.00 | 2. 80.00 | 5. 51.00 |
| 5 | (Russia) Stanislav Kokorin | 331.00 | 15. (22.00) | 12. 28.00 | 2. 80.00 | 9. 37.00 | 2. 80.00 | 13. 26.00 | 2. 80.00 |
| 6 | (Italy) Leonardo Gontero | 284.00 | 11. 31.00 | 13. (26.00) | 3. 65.00 | 6. 47.00 | 7. 43.00 | 5. 51.00 | 6. 47.00 |
| 7 | (China) QiXin Zhong | 196.00 | 6. 47.00 | 6. 47.00 | - | 15. 22.00 | - | 7. 43.00 | 9. 37.00 |
| 8 | (France) Guillaume Moro | 181.00 | 7. 43.00 | 18. 16.00 | 5. 51.00 | 10. 34.00 | 9. 37.00 | - | - |
| 9 | (Ukraine) Danyil Boldyrev | 167.00 | - | - | - | 4. 55.00 | - | 6. 47.00 | 3. 65.00 |
| 10 | (Poland) Marcin Dzieński | 164.00 | 21. (10.00) | 11. 31.00 | 15. 22.00 | 14. 24.00 | 5. 51.00 | 16. 20.00 | 18. 16.00 |

=== Women ===
6 best competition results were counted (not counting points in brackets) for IFSC Climbing World Cup 2017. Anouck Jaubert won.

| Rank | Name | Points | Xiamen | Wujiang | Edinburgh | Arco | Villars | Nanjing | Chongqing |
|---|---|---|---|---|---|---|---|---|---|
| 1 | (France) Anouck Jaubert | 545.00 | 1. 100.00 | 2. 80.00 | 1. 100.00 | 1. 100.00 | 1. 100.00 | 3. 65.00 | 5. (51.00) |
| 2 | (Russia) Iuliia Kaplina | 525.00 | 23. (8.00) | 1. 100.00 | 3. 65.00 | 2. 80.00 | 2. 80.00 | 1. 100.00 | 1. 100.00 |
| 3 | (Russia) Mariia Krasavina | 395.00 | 7. 43.00 | 6. 47.00 | 2. 80.00 | 11. (31.00) | 3. 65.00 | 2. 80.00 | 2. 80.00 |
| 4 | (Russia) Anna Tsyganova | 331.00 | 3. 65.00 | 8. 40.00 | - | 3. 65.00 | 5. 51.00 | 4. 55.00 | 4. 55.00 |
| 5 | (Ukraine) Alla Marenych | 280.00 | 6. 47.00 | 9. 37.00 | 7. 43.00 | 9. 37.00 | 12. (28.00) | 5. 51.00 | 3. 65.00 |
| 6 | (France) Aurelia Sarisson | 276.00 | 5. 51.00 | 5. 51.00 | 8. 40.00 | 5. 51.00 | 13. (26.00) | 7. 43.00 | 8. 40.00 |
| 7 | (Poland) Anna Brozek | 271.00 | 11. (31.00) | 10. 34.00 | 4. 55.00 | 4. 55.00 | 7. 43.00 | 9. 37.00 | 6. 47.00 |
| 8 | (Poland) Edyta Ropek | 213.00 | 17. 18.00 | 21. (10.00) | 10. 34.00 | 7. 43.00 | 9. 37.00 | 6. 47.00 | 10. 34.00 |
| 9 | (Poland) Klaudia Buczek | 179.00 | 19. (14.00) | 12. 28.00 | 9. 37.00 | 8. 40.00 | 17. 18.00 | 10. 34.00 | 15. 22.00 |
| 10 | (France) Victoire Andrier | 177.00 | 12. 28.00 | 11. 31.00 | 5. 51.00 | 16. 20.00 | 6. 47.00 | - | - |

=== National Teams ===
For National Team Ranking, 3 best results per competition and category were counted (not counting results in brackets). Russian Federation won.

| Rank | Nation | Points | Xiamen | Wujiang | Edinburgh | Arco | Villars | Nanjing | Chongqing |
|---|---|---|---|---|---|---|---|---|---|
| 1 | (Russia) Russian Federation | 2358 | 333 | 406 | (320) | 344 | 392 | 417 | 466 |
| 2 | France | 1220 | 222 | 178 | 242 | 205 | 210 | 163 | (146) |
| 3 | Italy | 996 | 114 | 93 | 305 | 225 | 152 | 107 | (81) |
| 4 | Poland | 919 | (82) | 112 | 191 | 177 | 182 | 138 | 119 |
| 5 | Indonesia | 793 | 329 | 324 | - | - | 140 | - | - |
| 6 | People's Republic of China | 670 | 141 | 155 | - | 22 | - | 160 | 192 |
| 7 | Ukraine | 596 | 112 | 71 | 43 | 94 | (40) | 122 | 154 |
| 8 | Islamic Republic of Iran | 392 | 35 | - | - | 114 | 100 | 100 | 43 |
| 9 | Czech Republic | 191 | - | - | 37 | 50 | 24 | 40 | 40 |
| 10 | Austria | 144 | - | 8 | 81 | 34 | 21 | - | - |

== Chongqing, China (22–23 April) ==
=== Men ===
42 athletes attended the World Cup in Chongqing. Vladislav Deulin won.

Round of 16
1 | (Ukraine) Danyil Boldyrev | 6.010
16 | (China) PengHui Lin | 6.610
8 | (China) QiXin Zhong | 6.300
9 | (Russia) Aleksandr Shikov | 6.150
4 | (Czech Republic) Libor Hroza | 6.060
13 | (Italy) Ludovico Fossali | fall
5 | (Russia) Stanislav Kokorin | 6.240
12 | (China) JinXin Li | 6.720
2 | (Iran) Reza Alipour | 6.110
15 | (Russia) Aleksandr Shilov | 8.640
7 | (France) Bassa Mawem | 6.630
10 | (Ukraine) Kostiantyn Pavlenko | 8.000
3 | (Russia) Vladislav Deulin | 6.270
14 | (Russia) Arsenii Bogomolov | 7.760
6 | (Italy) Leonardo Gontero | 6.320
11 | (Russia) Georgy Artamonov | 6.380

Quarterfinals
1 | (Ukraine) Danyil Boldyrev | 5.900
9 | (Russia) Aleksandr Shikov | 5.920
4 | (Czech Republic) Libor Hroza | 7.800
5 | (Russia) Stanislav Kokorin | 5.970
2 | (Iran) Reza Alipour | 6.440
7 | (France) Bassa Mawem | 6.120
3 | (Russia) Vladislav Deulin | 6.010
6 | (Italy) Leonardo Gontero | 6.160

Semifinals
1 | (Ukraine) Danyil Boldyrev | 6.730
5 | (Russia) Stanislav Kokorin | 6.230
7 | (France) Bassa Mawem | 8.320
3 | (Russia) Vladislav Deulin | 6.090

Final
5 | (Russia) Stanislav Kokorin | 5.960
3 | (Russia) Vladislav Deulin | 5.910
Small final
1 | (Ukraine) Danyil Boldyrev | 5.620
7 | (France) Bassa Mawem | 6.880

=== Women ===
20 athletes attended the World Cup in Chongqing. Iuliia Kaplina won.

Round of 16
1 | (France) Anouck Jaubert | 7.910
16 | (Russia) Iuliia Panteleeva | 11.560
8 | (Russia) Mariia Krasavina | 8.210
9 | (Poland) Klaudia Buczek | 12.560
4 | (Russia) Elena Timofeeva | 8.430
13 | (Kazakhstan) Assel Marlenova | 9.950
5 | (Russia) Anna Tsyganova | 8.170
12 | (China) YiLing Song | 8.950
2 | (Russia) Iuliia Kaplina | 8.250
15 | (China) Di Niu | 9.500
7 | (Poland) Anna Brozek | 8.470
10 | (Poland) Edyta Ropek | 9.050
3 | (Ukraine) Alla Marenych | 8.660
14 | (China) MingWei Ni | 9.320
6 | (France) Aurelia Sarisson | 8.210
11 | (China) CuiLian He | fall

Quarterfinals
1 | (France) Anouck Jaubert | 8.500
8 | (Russia) Mariia Krasavina | 8.170
4 | (Russia) Elena Timofeeva | 10.300
5 | (Russia) Anna Tsyganova | 7.970
2 | (Russia) Iuliia Kaplina | 7.820
7 | (Poland) Anna Brozek | 10.150
3 | (Ukraine) Alla Marenych | 8.310
6 | (France) Aurelia Sarisson | fall

Semifinals
8 | (Russia) Mariia Krasavina | 8.020
5 | (Russia) Anna Tsyganova | 8.710
2 | (Russia) Iuliia Kaplina | 7.460
3 | (Ukraine) Alla Marenych | 8.040

Final
8 | (Russia) Mariia Krasavina | 7.870
2 | (Russia) Iuliia Kaplina | 7.540
Small final
5 | (Russia) Anna Tsyganova | fall
3 | (Ukraine) Alla Marenych | 7.840

== Nanjing, China (29–30 April) ==
=== Men ===
40 athletes attended the World Cup in Nanjing. Reza Alipour won and set a new speed world record of 5.48 seconds in the semifinal race against Bassa Mawem of France, who finished fourth. The previous world record for men's 15-meter speed wall was set at 5.60 seconds by Danyil Boldyrev at the IFSC World Championships in 2014.

Round of 16
1 | (Iran) Reza Alipour | 5.630
16 | (Italy) Alessandro Santoni | 6.360
8 | (Russia) Stanislav Kokorin | 6.260
9 | (China) QiXin Zhong | 5.970
4 | (Czech Republic) Libor Hroza | 5.730
13 | (Russia) Arsenii Bogomolov | 6.120
5 | (France) Bassa Mawem | 5.840
12 | (Russia) Aleksandr Shilov | 6.010
2 | (Russia) Aleksandr Shikov | 5.800
15 | (Ukraine) Kostiantyn Pavlenko | 6.330
7 | (Italy) Leonardo Gontero | 6.000
10 | (Italy) Ludovico Fossali | 6.060
3 | (Ukraine) Danyil Boldyrev | 5.660
14 | (Russia) Georgy Artamonov | 6.140
6 | (Poland) Marcin Dzieński | fs
11 | (Russia) Vladislav Deulin | 6.380

Quarterfinals
1 | (Iran) Reza Alipour | 5.670
9 | (China) QiXin Zhong | 6.850
4 | (Czech Republic) Libor Hroza | fs
5 | (France) Bassa Mawem | 6.400
2 | (Russia) Aleksandr Shikov | 5.700
7 | (Italy) Leonardo Gontero | 5.920
3 | (Ukraine) Danyil Boldyrev | 6.040
11 | (Russia) Vladislav Deulin | 5.750

Semifinals
1 | (Iran) Reza Alipour | 5.480
5 | (France) Bassa Mawem | 5.740
2 | (Russia) Aleksandr Shikov | 5.610
11 | (Russia) Vladislav Deulin | 7.360

Final
1 | (Iran) Reza Alipour | 5.540
2 | (Russia) Aleksandr Shikov | fall
Small final
5 | (France) Bassa Mawem | 5.820
11 | (Russia) Vladislav Deulin | 5.790

=== Women ===
22 athletes attended the World Cup in Nanjing. Iuliia Kaplina won and set a new world record of 7.38, beating her time of 7.46 from last week in Chongqing.

Round of 16
1 | (Russia) Anna Tsyganova | 8.160
16 | (China) WangMu RenZeng | fall
8 | (Ukraine) Alla Marenych | 8.310
9 | (Poland) Anna Brozek | 8.380
4 | (Russia) Iuliia Kaplina | 7.790
13 | (Poland) Klaudia Buczek | 8.780
5 | (Russia) Elena Timofeeva | 8.290
12 | (China) YiLing Song | 9.160
2 | (France) Anouck Jaubert | 7.810
15 | (Kazakhstan) Assel Marlenova | 9.480
7 | (Poland) Edyta Ropek | 8.640
10 | (China) CuiLian He | 9.450
3 | (France) Aurelia Sarisson | 8.230
14 | (China) Di Niu | 9.050
6 | (Russia) Mariia Krasavina | 8.310
11 | (China) MingWei Ni | 9.070

Quarterfinals
1 | (Russia) Anna Tsyganova | 7.890
8 | (Ukraine) Alla Marenych | 8.060
4 | (Russia) Iuliia Kaplina | 7.930
5 | (Russia) Elena Timofeeva | 10.680
2 | (France) Anouck Jaubert | 7.620
7 | (Poland) Edyta Ropek | 8.210
3 | (France) Aurelia Sarisson | 9.270
6 | (Russia) Mariia Krasavina | 8.040

Semifinals
1 | (Russia) Anna Tsyganova | fall
4 | (Russia) Iuliia Kaplina | 7.930
2 | (France) Anouck Jaubert | 9.030
6 | (Russia) Mariia Krasavina | 7.840

Final
4 | (Russia) Iuliia Kaplina | 7.380
6 | (Russia) Mariia Krasavina | 8.100
Small final
1 | (Russia) Anna Tsyganova | fs
2 | (France) Anouck Jaubert | 8.170

== Villars, Switzerland (7–8 July) ==
=== Men ===
40 athletes attended the World Cup in Villars. Reza Alipour won.

Round of 16
1 | (Czech Republic) Libor Hroza | 7.630
16 | (Russia) Sergei Luzhetskii | 6.410
8 | (Italy) Ludovico Fossali | 8.260
9 | (Russia) Dmitrii Timofeev | fs
4 | (Poland) Marcin Dzieński | 6.420
13 | (Indonesia) Pangeran Septo Wibowo Siburian | fall
5 | (Russia) Stanislav Kokorin | 6.230
12 | (Italy) Gian Luca Zodda | 6.550
2 | (Iran) Reza Alipour | 5.960
15 | (Indonesia) Tonny Mamiri | 6.650
7 | (Russia) Aleksandr Shikov | 7.410
10 | (Italy) Leonardo Gontero | 6.310
3 | (Russia) Vladislav Deulin | 6.180
14 | (Indonesia) Yulianto Abudzar | 6.330
6 | (Russia) Georgy Artamonov | 6.240
11 | (France) Guillaume Moro | 6.300

Quarterfinals
16 | (Russia) Sergei Luzhetskii | 7.020
8 | (Italy) Ludovico Fossali | 6.640
4 | (Poland) Marcin Dzieński | 6.810
5 | (Russia) Stanislav Kokorin | 6.020
2 | (Iran) Reza Alipour | 5.820
10 | (Italy) Leonardo Gontero | 7.940
3 | (Russia) Vladislav Deulin | 5.920
6 | (Russia) Georgy Artamonov | fall

Semifinals
8 | (Italy) Ludovico Fossali | fall
5 | (Russia) Stanislav Kokorin | 6.150
2 | (Iran) Reza Alipour | 5.550
3 | (Russia) Vladislav Deulin | 5.870

Final
5 | (Russia) Stanislav Kokorin | 6.110
2 | (Iran) Reza Alipour | 5.630
Small final
8 | (Italy) Ludovico Fossali | 5.940
3 | (Russia) Vladislav Deulin | 5.840

=== Women ===
35 athletes attended the World Cup in Villars. Anouck Jaubert won.

Round of 16
1 | (Russia) Iuliia Kaplina | 8.650
16 | (Russia) Svetlana Sharova | 10.000
8 | (Ukraine) Alla Marenych | 8.970
9 | (France) Victoire Andrier | 8.840
4 | (Russia) Mariia Krasavina | 8.510
13 | (Poland) Patrycja Chudziak | 8.590
5 | (Russia) Anna Tsyganova | 22.350
12 | (Russia) Daria Kan | fs
2 | (France) Anouck Jaubert | 8.000
15 | (Russia) Svetlana Motovilova | 11.330
7 | (Russia) Elena Remizova | 8.310
10 | (Poland) Edyta Ropek | 8.440
3 | (Russia) Elizaveta Ivanova | 8.720
14 | (Indonesia) Puji Lestari | 8.790
6 | (Poland) Anna Brozek | 8.740
11 | (France) Aurelia Sarisson | 9.000

Quarterfinals
1 | (Russia) Iuliia Kaplina | 8.080
9 | (France) Victoire Andrier | 8.680
4 | (Russia) Mariia Krasavina | 8.040
5 | (Russia) Anna Tsyganova | 8.170
2 | (France) Anouck Jaubert | 7.860
7 | (Russia) Elena Remizova | fall
3 | (Russia) Elizaveta Ivanova | 9.050
6 | (Poland) Anna Brozek | fs

Semifinals
1 | (Russia) Iuliia Kaplina | 7.730
4 | (Russia) Mariia Krasavina | 8.020
2 | (France) Anouck Jaubert | 7.780
3 | (Russia) Elizaveta Ivanova | 8.150

Final
1 | (Russia) Iuliia Kaplina | 8.800
2 | (France) Anouck Jaubert | 8.220
Small final
4 | (Russia) Mariia Krasavina | 8.460
3 | (Russia) Elizaveta Ivanova | 8.730

== Arco, Italy (25–26 August) ==
=== Men ===
50 athletes attended the World Cup in Arco. Vladislav Deulin won.

Round of 16
1 | (Italy) Ludovico Fossali | 6.340
16 | (France) Guillaume Moro | 6.430
8 | (Italy) Leonardo Gontero | 6.510
9 | (China) QiXin Zhong | 7.780
4 | (Russia) Vladislav Deulin | 6.080
13 | (Russia) Arsenii Bogomolov | 7.140
5 | (Poland) Marcin Dzieński | 7.540
12 | (Italy) Gian Luca Zodda | 6.430
2 | (Iran) Reza Alipour | 5.940
15 | (Ecuador) Carlos Granja | 7.140
7 | (Czech Republic) Libor Hroza | 6.140
10 | (Russia) Dmitrii Timofeev | 8.840
3 | (Russia) Stanislav Kokorin | 6.010
14 | (Ukraine) Danyil Boldyrev | 5.910
6 | (Russia) Aleksandr Shikov | 7.420
11 | (Italy) Alessandro Santoni | 6.290

Quarterfinals
1 | (Italy) Ludovico Fossali | 5.840
8 | (Italy) Leonardo Gontero | 6.330
4 | (Russia) Vladislav Deulin | 6.040
12 | (Italy) Gian Luca Zodda | 6.190
2 | (Iran) Reza Alipour | 6.150
7 | (Czech Republic) Libor Hroza | fall
14 | (Ukraine) Danyil Boldyrev | 5.930
11 | (Italy) Alessandro Santoni | 7.030

Semifinals
1 | (Italy) Ludovico Fossali | 6.160
4 | (Russia) Vladislav Deulin | 5.900
2 | (Iran) Reza Alipour | 6.190
14 | (Ukraine) Danyil Boldyrev | fall

Final
4 | (Russia) Vladislav Deulin | 5.830
2 | (Iran) Reza Alipour | fall
Small final
1 | (Italy) Ludovico Fossali | 10.000
14 | (Ukraine) Danyil Boldyrev | fs

=== Women ===
45 athletes attended the World Cup in Arco. Anouck Jaubert won.

Round of 16
1 | (Russia) Iuliia Kaplina | 8.170
16 | (Italy) Silvia Porta | 12.120
8 | (Russia) Elena Timofeeva | fall
9 | (Italy) Elisabetta Dalla Brida | fs
4 | (Russia) Anna Tsyganova | 8.280
13 | (Ukraine) Alla Marenych | 9.210
5 | (France) Aurelia Sarisson | 8.630
12 | (Poland) Klaudia Buczek | 8.890
2 | (France) Anouck Jaubert | 8.200
15 | (Iran) Farnaz Esmaeilzadeh | 9.230
7 | (Poland) Patrycja Chudziak | fall
10 | (Poland) Edyta Ropek | 8.590
3 | (Russia) Mariia Krasavina | 9.680
14 | (Ecuador) Andrea Rojas | 8.810
6 | (Poland) Anna Brozek | 8.480
11 | (France) Victoire Andrier | fall

Quarterfinals
1 | (Russia) Iuliia Kaplina | wc
4 | (Russia) Anna Tsyganova | 8.280
5 | (France) Aurelia Sarisson | 8.800
2 | (France) Anouck Jaubert | 8.200
10 | (Poland) Edyta Ropek | 8.980
14 | (Ecuador) Andrea Rojas | 8.890
6 | (Poland) Anna Brozek | 8.480

Semifinals
1 | (Russia) Iuliia Kaplina | 8.170
4 | (Russia) Anna Tsyganova | 8.270
2 | (France) Anouck Jaubert | 8.010
6 | (Poland) Anna Brozek | 8.380

Final
1 | (Russia) Iuliia Kaplina | fs
2 | (France) Anouck Jaubert | 8.110
Small final
4 | (Russia) Anna Tsyganova | 7.910
6 | (Poland) Anna Brozek | fall

== Edinburgh, United Kingdom (23–24 September) ==
=== Men ===
29 athletes attended the World Cup in Edinburgh. Ludovico Fossali won.

Round of 16
1 | (Russia) Vladislav Deulin | 6.220
16 | (Germany) David Firnenburg | 10.010
8 | (Italy) Ludovico Fossali | 6.270
9 | (Czech Republic) Jan Kriz | 6.830
4 | (Russia) Aleksandr Shikov | 6.520
13 | (Austria) Lukas Knapp | 7.580
5 | (France) Guillaume Moro | 6.770
12 | (Germany) Jan Hojer | 7.440
2 | (Russia) Stanislav Kokorin | 6.440
15 | (United States) Josh Levin | 8.090
7 | (Italy) Gian Luca Zodda | fall
10 | (Poland) Rafal Halasa | 7.270
3 | (Poland) Marcin Dzieński | fs
14 | (Italy) Alessandro Santoni | 9.950
6 | (Italy) Leonardo Gontero | 6.610
11 | (Italy) Stanislao Zama | 9.020

Quarterfinals
1 | (Russia) Vladislav Deulin | fall
8 | (Italy) Ludovico Fossali | 5.960
4 | (Russia) Aleksandr Shikov | 6.070
5 | (France) Guillaume Moro | 6.190
2 | (Russia) Stanislav Kokorin | 6.150
10 | (Poland) Rafal Halasa | 6.510
14 | (Italy) Alessandro Santoni | 6.450
6 | (Italy) Leonardo Gontero | 6.300

Semifinals
8 | (Italy) Ludovico Fossali | 5.790
4 | (Russia) Aleksandr Shikov | 5.840
2 | (Russia) Stanislav Kokorin | 5.950
6 | (Italy) Leonardo Gontero | 6.050

Final
8 | (Italy) Ludovico Fossali | 19.170
2 | (Russia) Stanislav Kokorin | fs
Small final
4 | (Russia) Aleksandr Shikov | 6.280
6 | (Italy) Leonardo Gontero | 6.250

=== Women ===
24 athletes attended the World Cup in Edinburgh. Anouck Jaubert won.

Round of 16
1 | (France) Anouck Jaubert | 8.180
16 | (Italy) Francesca Vasi | 10.390
8 | (Poland) Edyta Ropek | 8.930
9 | (Ukraine) Alla Marenych | 8.750
4 | (Poland) Anna Brozek | 9.700
13 | (Italy) Silvia Porta | 10.040
5 | (Poland) Klaudia Buczek | 8.580
12 | (France) Aurelia Sarisson | 8.570
2 | (Russia) Iuliia Kaplina | 8.190
15 | (Poland) Monika Prokopiuk | 10.100
7 | (France) Victoire Andrier | 8.780
10 | (France) Elma Fleuret | 9.240
3 | (Russia) Mariia Krasavina | 8.370
14 | (Austria) Alexandra Elmer | 10.110
6 | (Italy) Elisabetta Dalla Brida | 8.960
11 | (Austria) Nina Lach | 9.860

Quarterfinals
1 | (France) Anouck Jaubert | 7.910
9 | (Ukraine) Alla Marenych | 9.120
4 | (Poland) Anna Brozek | 8.280
12 | (France) Aurelia Sarisson | fall
2 | (Russia) Iuliia Kaplina | 7.830
7 | (France) Victoire Andrier | 8.540
3 | (Russia) Mariia Krasavina | 8.100
6 | (Italy) Elisabetta Dalla Brida | 8.680

Semifinals
1 | (France) Anouck Jaubert | 7.770
4 | (Poland) Anna Brozek | 8.200
2 | (Russia) Iuliia Kaplina | 8.690
3 | (Russia) Mariia Krasavina | 7.770

Final
1 | (France) Anouck Jaubert | 7.930
3 | (Russia) Mariia Krasavina | 10.350
Small final
4 | (Poland) Anna Brozek | 8.120
2 | (Russia) Iuliia Kaplina | 7.680

== Wujiang, China (7–8 October) ==
=== Men ===
38 athletes attended the World Cup in Wujiang. Aleksandr Shikov won.

Round of 16
1 | (Indonesia) Aspar Jaelolo | 6.360
16 | (Indonesia) Pangeran Septo Wibowo Siburian | 7.030
8 | (Russia) Aleksandr Shilov | 6.430
9 | (Italy) Leonardo Gontero | 6.530
4 | (Russia) Stanislav Kokorin | 6.380
13 | (Russia) Dmitrii Timofeev | 6.320
5 | (Indonesia) Sabri Sabri | 6.260
12 | (Ukraine) Kostiantyn Pavlenko | 6.280
2 | (Poland) Marcin Dzieński | 6.330
15 | (Indonesia) Sufriyanto Rindi | 6.240
7 | (China) JinXin Li | 7.620
10 | (Russia) Vladislav Deulin | 6.090
3 | (Italy) Ludovico Fossali | 6.130
14 | (China) QiXin Zhong | 6.040
6 | (Russia) Aleksandr Shikov | 6.120
11 | (China) ZhiYong Ou | 6.530

Quarterfinals
1 | (Indonesia) Aspar Jaelolo | 6.090
8 | (Russia) Aleksandr Shilov | 8.140
13 | (Russia) Dmitrii Timofeev | 6.150
5 | (Indonesia) Sabri Sabri | 6.080
15 | (Indonesia) Sufriyanto Rindi | 6.230
10 | (Russia) Vladislav Deulin | fall
14 | (China) QiXin Zhong | 7.350
6 | (Russia) Aleksandr Shikov | 6.290

Semifinals
1 | (Indonesia) Aspar Jaelolo | 5.840
5 | (Indonesia) Sabri Sabri | 5.990
15 | (Indonesia) Sufriyanto Rindi | fs
6 | (Russia) Aleksandr Shikov | wc

Final
1 | (Indonesia) Aspar Jaelolo | 6.330
6 | (Russia) Aleksandr Shikov | 6.320
Small final
5 | (Indonesia) Sabri Sabri | fs
15 | (Indonesia) Sufriyanto Rindi | wc

=== Women ===
27 athletes attended the World Cup in Wujiang. Iuliia Kaplina won.

Round of 16
1 | (Indonesia) Aries Susanti Rahayu | wc
16 | (Russia) Elena Timofeeva | fs
8 | (Poland) Anna Brozek | 8.760
9 | (France) Aurelia Sarisson | 8.360
4 | (Russia) Anna Tsyganova | 8.400
13 | (China) YiLing Song | 10.390
5 | (France) Anouck Jaubert | 8.060
12 | (France) Victoire Andrier | 8.960
2 | (Russia) Iuliia Kaplina | 8.080
15 | (China) CuiLian He | 10.930
7 | (Russia) Mariia Krasavina | 8.550
10 | (Indonesia) Puji Lestari | 9.790
3 | (Indonesia) Santi Wellyanti | 8.890
14 | (Poland) Klaudia Buczek | 9.280
6 | (Ukraine) Alla Marenych | 8.680
11 | (Russia) Elizaveta Ivanova | 8.450

Quarterfinals
1 | (Indonesia) Aries Susanti Rahayu | 8.080
9 | (France) Aurelia Sarisson | 8.280
4 | (Russia) Anna Tsyganova | 9.120
5 | (France) Anouck Jaubert | 8.910
2 | (Russia) Iuliia Kaplina | 7.770
7 | (Russia) Mariia Krasavina | 8.350
3 | (Indonesia) Santi Wellyanti | 8.510
11 | (Russia) Elizaveta Ivanova | 8.350

Semifinals
1 | (Indonesia) Aries Susanti Rahayu | 9.230
5 | (France) Anouck Jaubert | 7.920
2 | (Russia) Iuliia Kaplina | 7.860
11 | (Russia) Elizaveta Ivanova | 8.340

Final
5 | (France) Anouck Jaubert | 7.730
2 | (Russia) Iuliia Kaplina | 7.660
Small final
1 | (Indonesia) Aries Susanti Rahayu | fs
11 | (Russia) Elizaveta Ivanova | wc

== Xiamen, China (14–15 October) ==
=== Men ===
34 athletes attended the World Cup in Xiamen. Vladislav Deulin won.

Round of 16
1 | (Iran) Reza Alipour | 6.470
16 | (Ukraine) Kostiantyn Pavlenko | 6.410
8 | (Russia) Stanislav Kokorin | fall
9 | (China) QiXin Zhong | 5.920
4 | (Indonesia) Aspar Jaelolo | 5.980
13 | (Indonesia) Yulianto Abudzar | fall
5 | (Russia) Aleksandr Shilov | 7.940
12 | (France) Guillaume Moro | 6.260
2 | (Italy) Ludovico Fossali | 5.930
15 | (Indonesia) Sabri Sabri | 6.030
7 | (Russia) Aleksandr Shikov | fall
10 | (Russia) Dmitrii Timofeev | 6.330
3 | (Russia) Vladislav Deulin | 5.850
14 | (Russia) Arsenii Bogomolov | 6.150
6 | (Indonesia) Hinayah Muhammad | 6.190
11 | (Italy) Leonardo Gontero | 6.220

Quarterfinals
16 | (Ukraine) Kostiantyn Pavlenko | 6.050
9 | (China) QiXin Zhong | 7.310
4 | (Indonesia) Aspar Jaelolo | 6.290
12 | (France) Guillaume Moro | 7.970
2 | (Italy) Ludovico Fossali | 6.020
10 | (Russia) Dmitrii Timofeev | 6.330
3 | (Russia) Vladislav Deulin | 5.600
6 | (Indonesia) Hinayah Muhammad | fall

Semifinals
16 | (Ukraine) Kostiantyn Pavlenko | 6.100
4 | (Indonesia) Aspar Jaelolo | 5.950
2 | (Italy) Ludovico Fossali | fall
3 | (Russia) Vladislav Deulin | 5.770

Final
4 | (Indonesia) Aspar Jaelolo | 5.700
3 | (Russia) Vladislav Deulin | 5.530
Small final
16 | (Ukraine) Kostiantyn Pavlenko | 6.340
2 | (Italy) Ludovico Fossali | 7.210

=== Women ===
24 athletes attended the World Cup in Xiamen. Anouck Jaubert won.

Round of 16
1 | (Indonesia) Aries Susanti Rahayu | 7.960
16 | (Indonesia) Fitriyani Fitriyani | 8.860
8 | (China) CuiLian He | 8.580
9 | (Russia) Elena Timofeeva | 8.500
4 | (Russia) Mariia Krasavina | 8.200
13 | (France) Victoire Andrier | 8.860
5 | (Indonesia) Puji Lestari | 8.050
12 | (Indonesia) Santi Wellyanti | 8.520
2 | (France) Anouck Jaubert | 7.990
15 | (China) YiLing Song | 9.240
7 | (France) Aurelia Sarisson | 8.280
10 | (Poland) Anna Brozek | 8.590
3 | (Russia) Anna Tsyganova | wc
14 | (Italy) Elisabetta Dalla Brida | fs
6 | (Russia) Elizaveta Ivanova | fall
11 | (Ukraine) Alla Marenych | 9.400

Quarterfinals
1 | (Indonesia) Aries Susanti Rahayu | 7.800
9 | (Russia) Elena Timofeeva | 9.820
4 | (Russia) Mariia Krasavina | 9.300
5 | (Indonesia) Puji Lestari | 8.180
2 | (France) Anouck Jaubert | 7.760
7 | (France) Aurelia Sarisson | 8.360
3 | (Russia) Anna Tsyganova | 8.090
11 | (Ukraine) Alla Marenych | 8.630

Semifinals
1 | (Indonesia) Aries Susanti Rahayu | 7.800
5 | (Indonesia) Puji Lestari | 8.610
2 | (France) Anouck Jaubert | 7.650
3 | (Russia) Anna Tsyganova | 8.610

Final
1 | (Indonesia) Aries Susanti Rahayu | 10.150
2 | (France) Anouck Jaubert | 7.780
Small final
5 | (Indonesia) Puji Lestari | fall
3 | (Russia) Anna Tsyganova | 8.160
