= Sport climbing at the 2017 World Games – Men's speed =

Sport climbing - Men's Speed at the 2017 World Games
- Venue: Nowy Targ Square, Wrocław, Poland
- Dates: 22 July 2017
- Competitors: 12 from 9 nations

Medalists
gold medal	(Iran) Reza Alipour
silver medal	(Ukraine) Danylo Boldyrev
bronze medal	(Russia) Stanislav Kokorin

The men's speed competition in sport climbing at the 2017 World Games took place on 22 July 2017 at the Nowy Targ Square in Wrocław, Poland.

== Competition format ==
A total of 12 athletes entered the competition. In qualification every athlete has 2 runs, best time counts. Top 8 climbers qualify to main competition.

== Results ==
=== Qualifications ===
Rank	Athlete	Nation	Time 1	Time 2	Best of	Note
1	Danylo Boldyrev	Ukraine	5.59	5.60	5.59	Q
2	Reza Alipour	Iran	5.64	5,75	5.64	Q
3	Marcin Dzieński	Poland	6.09	5.84	5.84	Q
4	Stanislav Kokorin	Russia	5.90	6.04	5.90	Q
5	Libor Hroza	Czech Republic	7.17	5.96	5.96	Q
6	Bassa Mawem	France	6.04	6.08	6.04	Q
7	Aleksandr Shikov	Russia	7.00	6.09	6.09	Q
8	John Brosler	United States	7.72	6.10	6.10	Q
9	Leonardo Gontero	Italy	DNF	6.41	6.41	
10	Ashari Fajri	Indonesia	6.66	6.55	6.55	
11	Rafał Hałasa	Poland	6.58	8.34	6.58	
12	Ludovico Fossali	Italy	6.93	DNF	6.93	

=== Competition bracket ===
Quarter-finals
1	(Ukraine) Danylo Boldyrev	6.10
8	(United States) John Brosler	6.58
4	(Russia) Stanislav Kokorin	7.94
5	(Czech Republic) Libor Hroza	DSQ
2	(Iran) Reza Alipour	5.77
7	(Russia) Aleksandr Shikov	7.37
3	(Poland) Marcin Dzieński	8.02
6	(France) Bassa Mawem	8.47

Semi-finals
1	(Ukraine) Danylo Boldyrev	'5.66
4	(Russia) Stanislav Kokorin	5.85
2	(Iran) Reza Alipour	5.69
3	(Poland) Marcin Dzieński	DSQ

Finals
1	(Ukraine) Danylo Boldyrev	DSQ
2	(Iran) Reza Alipour	5.57
Third place
4	(Russia) Stanislav Kokorin	5.80
3	(Poland) Marcin Dzieński	5.99
