= 2014 IFSC Climbing World Championships =

Competition climbing event

- Location: Munich, Germany; Gijón, Spain
- Date: 21 August – 14 September 2014
- Competitors: 432 from 52 nations
- Website: http://med.gijon.es/

The 2014 IFSC Climbing World Championships, the 13th edition, were held in Munich, Germany from 21 to 23 August 2014 for bouldering and in Gijón, Spain from 8 to 14 September 2014 for lead, speed, and paraclimbing.

Danyil Boldyrev set a new world record of 5.60s in the speed final against Stanislav Kokorin.

== Medal winners overview ==
Event	Gold	Silver	Bronze
Men's Lead	(Czech Republic) Adam Ondra	(Spain) Ramón Julián Puigblanqué	(Japan) Sachi Amma
Men's Bouldering	(Czech Republic) Adam Ondra	(Slovenia) Jernej Kruder	(Germany) Jan Hojer
Men's Speed	(Ukraine) Danyil Boldyrev	(Russia) Stanislav Kokorin	(Iran) Reza Alipour
Men's Combined	(Canada) Sean McColl	(Germany) Jan Hojer	(France) Alban Levier
Women's Lead	(South Korea) Jain Kim	(Slovenia) Mina Markovič	(Austria) Magdalena Röck
Women's Bouldering	(Germany) Juliane Wurm	(United States) Alex Puccio	(Japan) Akiyo Noguchi
Women's Speed	(Russia) Alina Gaidamakina	(Poland) Klaudia Buczek	(Poland) Aleksandra Rudzinska
Women's Combined	(France) Charlotte Durif	(Switzerland) Petra Klingler	(Slovenia) Mina Markovič

== Bouldering ==
=== Women ===
80 athletes attended the women's bouldering competition.

Rank	Name	Score
1	(Germany) Juliane Wurm	3t8 4b8
2	(United States) Alex Puccio	3t9 4b9
3	(Japan) Akiyo Noguchi	1t1 3b3
4	(United Kingdom) Shauna Coxsey	1t4 4b7
5	(France) Mélissa Le Nevé	0t 3b3
6	(United Kingdom) Michaela Tracy	0t 3b5

=== Men ===
112 athletes attended the men's bouldering competition.

Rank	Name	Score
1	(Czech Republic) Adam Ondra	4t16 4b16
2	(Slovenia) Jernej Kruder	3t12 4b13
3	(Germany) Jan Hojer	3t12 3b9
4	(France) Guillaume Glairon Mondet	2t6 3b7
5	(Russia) Dmitrii Sharafutdinov	1t4 3b9
6	(Japan) Tsukuru Hori	0t 2b9

== Lead ==
=== Women ===
49 athletes attended the women's lead competition.

Rank	Name	Score
1	(South Korea) Jain Kim	Top
2	(Slovenia) Mina Markovič	47+
3	(Austria) Magdalena Röck	47+
4	(France) Hélène Janicot	44+
5	(Slovenia) Maja Vidmar	36
6	(Belgium) Anak Verhoeven	35+
7	(Japan) Yuka Kobayashi	35+
8	(France) Charlotte Durif	35

=== Men ===
74 athletes attended the men's lead competition.

Rank	Name	Score
1	(Czech Republic) Adam Ondra	45+
2	(Spain) Ramón Julián Puigblanqué	45
3	(Japan) Sachi Amma	42+
4	(Slovenia) Domen Škofic	42+
5	(Austria) Jakob Schubert	40+
6	(Canada) Sean McColl	40+
7	(France) Romain Desgranges	29
8	(France) Gautier Supper	24+

== Speed ==
=== Women ===
35 athletes competed in the women's speed climbing event.

Round of 16
1	(Russia) Mariia Krasavina	8.370
16	(Austria) Alexandra Elmer	9.230
8	(Russia) Alina Gaidamakina	8.470
9	(Russia) Kseniya Polekhina	8.510
4	(Ukraine) Alla Marenych	8.790
13	(Poland) Edyta Ropek	8.670
5	(Russia) Anna Tsyganova	8.670
12	(Poland) Patrycja Chudziak	8.860
2	(France) Anouck Jaubert	10.020
15	(Russia) Daria Kan	9.520
7	(Russia) Yuliya Levochkina	8.980
10	(Poland) Aleksandra Rudzinska	8.650
3	(Russia) Iuliia Kaplina	8.240
14	(Kazakhstan) Tamara Ulzhabayeva	9.400
6	(Poland) Klaudia Buczek	8.700
11	(Russia) Elena Timofeeva	fall

Quarterfinals
1	(Russia) Mariia Krasavina	8.750
8	(Russia) Alina Gaidamakina	8.640
13	(Poland) Edyta Ropek	9.100
5	(Russia) Anna Tsyganova	9.930
15	(Russia) Daria Kan	9.130
10	(Poland) Aleksandra Rudzinska	8.850
3	(Russia) Iuliia Kaplina	fs
6	(Poland) Klaudia Buczek	9.050

Semifinals
8	(Russia) Alina Gaidamakina	8.880
13	(Poland) Edyta Ropek	9.380
10	(Poland) Aleksandra Rudzinska	fall
6	(Poland) Klaudia Buczek	8.710

Final
8	(Russia) Alina Gaidamakina	8.380
6	(Poland) Klaudia Buczek	8.550
Small final
13	(Poland) Edyta Ropek	9.080
10	(Poland) Aleksandra Rudzinska	9.000

=== Men ===
38 athletes competed in the men's speed climbing event.

Round of 16
1	(Ukraine) Danyil Boldyrev	6.190
16	(France) Quentin Nambot	6.730
8	(Italy) Leonardo Gontero	6.470
9	(Indonesia) Aspar Jaelolo	6.480
4	(Iran) Reza Alipour	6.220
13	(Russia) Dmitrii Timofeev	8.640
5	(China) QiXin Zhong	7.100
12	(Poland) Marcin Dzieński	6.360
2	(Czech Republic) Libor Hroza	6.700
15	(Ecuador) Isaac Estevez	7.920
7	(Russia) Nikita Suyushkin	6.770
10	(Russia) Evgenii Vaitsekhovskii	6.550
3	(Russia) Stanislav Kokorin	6.490
14	(Russia) Aleksandr Shikov	7.460
6	(France) Bassa Mawem	6.170
11	(Russia) Arsenii Shevchenko	7.340

Quarterfinals
1	(Ukraine) Danyil Boldyrev	5.990
8	(Italy) Leonardo Gontero	6.170
4	(Iran) Reza Alipour	6.070
12	(Poland) Marcin Dzieński	6.090
2	(Czech Republic) Libor Hroza	7.430
10	(Russia) Evgenii Vaitsekhovskii	6.680
3	(Russia) Stanislav Kokorin	6.190
6	(France) Bassa Mawem	6.270

Semifinals
1	(Ukraine) Danyil Boldyrev	5.740
4	(Iran) Reza Alipour	fs
10	(Russia) Evgenii Vaitsekhovskii	8.100
3	(Russia) Stanislav Kokorin	6.150

Final
1	(Ukraine) Danyil Boldyrev	5.600
3	(Russia) Stanislav Kokorin	5.920
Small final
4	(Iran) Reza Alipour	6.110
10	(Russia) Evgenii Vaitsekhovskii	6.180

== Combined ==
Only climbers who competed in all three disciplines (Lead, Speed, and Boulder) of both IFSC World Championships Munich 2014 and IFSC World Championships Gijón 2014 were included in the Combined ranking.

=== Women ===
Rank	Name
1	(France) Charlotte Durif
2	(Switzerland) Petra Klingler
3	(Slovenia) Mina Markovič
4	(Russia) Dinara Fakhritdinova
5	(Austria) Barbara Bacher
6	(Colombia) Flor de Luna Pazan

=== Men ===
Rank	Name
1	(Canada) Sean McColl
2	(Germany) Jan Hojer
3	(France) Alban Levier
4	(Germany) Thomas Tauporn
5	(Slovenia) Domen Škofic
6	(Norway) Magnus Midtboe
7	(Spain) Marco Antonio Jubes Angarita
8	(Colombia) Anghelo Bernal
