= 2016 IFSC Climbing World Championships =

- official competition logo
- Location: Paris, France
- Date: 14–18 September 2016
- Competitors: 533 from 53 nations
- Website: http://worldclimbing2016.com/en/

The 2016 IFSC Climbing World Championships, the 14th edition, were held in Paris, France from 14 to 18 September 2016.

== Medal winners overview ==
Event	Gold	Silver	Bronze
Men's Lead	(Czech Republic) Adam Ondra	(Austria) Jakob Schubert	(France) Gautier Supper
Men's Bouldering	(Japan) Tomoa Narasaki	(Czech Republic) Adam Ondra	(France) Manuel Cornu
Men's Speed	(Poland) Marcin Dzieński	(Iran) Reza Alipour	(Russia) Aleksandr Shikov
Men's Combined	(Canada) Sean McColl	(France) Manuel Cornu	(Germany) David Firnenburg
Women's Lead	(Slovenia) Janja Garnbret	(Belgium) Anak Verhoeven	(Slovenia) Mina Markovič
Women's Bouldering	(Switzerland) Petra Klingler	(Japan) Miho Nonaka	(Japan) Akiyo Noguchi
Women's Speed	(Russia) Anna Tsyganova	(France) Anouck Jaubert	(Russia) Iuliia Kaplina
Women's Combined	(Russia) Elena Krasovskaia	(United States) Claire Buhrfeind	(France) Charlotte Durif

== Lead ==
=== Women ===
75 athletes attended the women's lead competition.

Rank	Name	Score
1	(Slovenia) Janja Garnbret	Top
2	(Belgium) Anak Verhoeven	Top
3	(Slovenia) Mina Markovič	43+
4	(South Korea) Jain Kim	43+
5	(Austria) Jessica Pilz	43+
6	(France) Julia Chanourdie	25+
7	(Austria) Magdalena Röck	23+
7	(United States) Claire Buhrfeind	23+
9	(Switzerland) Alina Ring	19

=== Men ===
104 athletes attended the men's lead competition.

Rank	Name	Score
1	(Czech Republic) Adam Ondra	Top
2	(Austria) Jakob Schubert	42+
3	(France) Gautier Supper	41
4	(Slovenia) Domen Škofic	38+
5	(France) Romain Desgranges	38+
6	(Canada) Sean McColl	37+
7	(Italy) Stefano Ghisolfi	37
8	(Japan) Keiichiro Korenaga	28
9	(Spain) Ramón Julián Puigblanqué	9+

== Bouldering ==
=== Women ===
87 athletes attended the women's bouldering competition.

Rank	Name	Score
1	(Switzerland) Petra Klingler	3t4 4b6
2	(Japan) Miho Nonaka	3t9 4b9
3	(Japan) Akiyo Noguchi	2t2 4b7
4	(United States) Megan Mascarenas	2t2 4b8
5	(Austria) Anna Stöhr	2t5 4b12
6	(Russia) Elena Krasovskaia	0t 2b5

=== Men ===
123 athletes attended the men's bouldering competition.

Rank	Name	Score
1	(Japan) Tomoa Narasaki	3t6 4b7
2	(Czech Republic) Adam Ondra	3t11 4b10
3	(France) Manuel Cornu	2t9 3b8
4	(France) Mickaël Mawem	1t1 3b5
5	(France) Jeremy Bonder	1t2 2b5
6	(Japan) Tsukuru Hori	1t6 2b7

== Speed ==
=== Women ===
46 athletes competed in the women's speed climbing event.

Round of 16
1	(Russia) Anna Tsyganova	8.670
16	(Italy) Elisabetta Dalla Brida	fall
8	(France) Elma Fleuret	9.190
9	(Russia) Elizaveta Ivanova	fall
4	(Poland) Aleksandra Rudzinska	8.580
13	(France) Victoire Andrier	10.310
5	(Poland) Klaudia Buczek	8.630
12	(Austria) Nina Lach	9.350
2	(France) Anouck Jaubert	8.190
15	(Kazakhstan) Tamara Ulzhabayeva	9.430
7	(France) Aurelia Sarisson	fall
10	(Russia) Daria Kan	9.150
3	(Russia) Iuliia Kaplina	8.260
14	(Ukraine) Alla Marenych	9.080
6	(Poland) Anna Brozek	9.140
11	(Poland) Patrycja Chudziak	9.040

Quarterfinals
1	(Russia) Anna Tsyganova	7.850
8	(France) Elma Fleuret	8.580
4	(Poland) Aleksandra Rudzinska	8.070
5	(Poland) Klaudia Buczek	8.120
2	(France) Anouck Jaubert	7.860
10	(Russia) Daria Kan	8.710
3	(Russia) Iuliia Kaplina	8.030
11	(Poland) Patrycja Chudziak	9.170

Semifinals
1	(Russia) Anna Tsyganova	7.850
4	(Poland) Aleksandra Rudzinska	8.130
2	(France) Anouck Jaubert	8.340
3	(Russia) Iuliia Kaplina	8.580

Final
1	(Russia) Anna Tsyganova	7.520
2	(France) Anouck Jaubert	7.790
Small final
4	(Poland) Aleksandra Rudzinska	8.400
3	(Russia) Iuliia Kaplina	8.230

=== Men ===
55 athletes competed in the men's speed climbing event.

Round of 16
1	(Iran) Reza Alipour	6.170
16	(Ukraine) Kostiantyn Pavlenko	6.340
8	(Italy) Leonardo Gontero	6.370
9	(China) QiXin Zhong	fall
4	(Russia) Aleksandr Shikov	6.460
13	(Czech Republic) Jan Kriz	fall
5	(Russia) Stanislav Kokorin	6.260
12	(Russia) Dmitrii Timofeev	6.310
2	(Ukraine) Danyil Boldyrev	6.300
15	(Italy) Ludovico Fossali	7.290
7	(Poland) Marcin Dzieński	6.230
10	(Russia) Georgy Artamonov	fall
3	(Czech Republic) Libor Hroza	6.450
14	(United States) John Brosler	7.210
6	(France) Bassa Mawem	6.090
11	(France) Quentin Nambot	6.590

Quarterfinals
1	(Iran) Reza Alipour	6.000
8	(Italy) Leonardo Gontero	6.240
4	(Russia) Aleksandr Shikov	6.090
5	(Russia) Stanislav Kokorin	6.250
2	(Ukraine) Danyil Boldyrev	fall
7	(Poland) Marcin Dzieński	5.930
3	(Czech Republic) Libor Hroza	8.210
6	(France) Bassa Mawem	7.720

Semifinals
1	(Iran) Reza Alipour	6.070
4	(Russia) Aleksandr Shikov	6.080
7	(Poland) Marcin Dzieński	6.060
6	(France) Bassa Mawem	fall

Final
1	(Iran) Reza Alipour	7.370
7	(Poland) Marcin Dzieński	5.830
Small final
4	(Russia) Aleksandr Shikov	5.950
6	(France) Bassa Mawem	6.880

== Combined ==
The Combined ranking offers an Overall comparison of Athletes across the three Sport Climbing disciplines of Bouldering, Lead and Speed. The formula is simple: competitors must compete in all three disciplines to qualify and are ranked based on the aggregate of their places in the individual disciplines, in ascending order (lowest score is best). Ties are broken by comparing the competitors’ best scores.

=== Women ===
Rank	Name	Lead		Boulder		Speed		TOTAL
Rank	Name	Rank	Place	Rank	Place	Rank	Place	TOTAL
1	(Russia) Elena Krasovskaia	29	5.5	6	1	20	2	8.5
2	(United States) Claire Burfeind	7	1	41	7	24	3	11
3	(France) Charlotte Durif	13	2	33	5	26	4	11
4	(Italy) Andrea Ebner	29	5.5	14	2	35	7	14.5
5	(United States) Kyra Condie	37	9.5	36	6	29	5	20.5
6	(Kazakhstan) Tamara Kuznetsova	55	12	45	8	15	1	21
7	(Canada) Alannah Yip	43	11	16	3	38	8	22
8	(Ukraine) Ievgeniia Kazbekova	31	7.5	21	4	44	12	23.5
9	(United States) Delaney Miller	19	3	53	10	43	11	24
10	(United States) Grace McKeehan	37	9.5	63	11	32	6	26.5
11	(Italy) Asja Gollo	31	7.5	49	9	40	10	26.5
12	(Norway) Tina Johnsen Hafsaas	21	4	71	12	46	13	29
13	(Canada) Alison Stewart-Patterson	57	13	86	13	39	9	35

=== Men ===
Rank	Name	Lead		Boulder		Speed		TOTAL
Rank	Name	Rank	Place	Rank	Place	Rank	Place	TOTAL
1	(Canada) Sean McColl	6	1	14	2	38	4	7
2	(France) Manuel Cornu	51	8	3	1	32	1	10
3	(Germany) David Firnenburg	23	3	49	6	44	6	15
4	(South Korea) Seungwoon Cho	39	5	71	9	37	3	17
5	(Sweden) Hannes Puman	15	2	85	13	47	7	22
6	(China) Pan Yufei	59	12	57	7	42	5	24
7	(United Kingdom) David Barrans	45	7	29	4	54	14	25
8	(Latvia) Rolands Rugens	75	15	27	3	48	8	26
9	(Canada) Elan JonasMcRae	41	6	77	10.5	50	10	26.5
10	(Spain) Eric Lopez Mateos	63	13	35	5	49	9	27
11	(Belgium) Stephane Hanssens	57	10.5	65	8	51	11	29.5
12	(Kazakhstan) Artyom Devyaterikov	67	14	91	14	34	2	30
13	(Spain) Javier Cano Blazquez	28	4	102	15	52	12	31
14	(Israel) Or Wechsler	53	9	77	10.5	53	13	32.5
15	(United Kingdom) James Pope	57	10.5	81	12	55	15	37.5
