= 2011 IFSC Climbing World Championships =

- Location: Arco, Italy
- Date: 15–24 July 2011
- Competitors: 374 from 56 nations

The 2011 IFSC Climbing World Championships, the 11th edition, were held in Arco, Italy from 15 to 24 July 2011.

QiXin Zhong set a new world record of 6.26s in the final round against Stanislav Kokorin.

== Medal winners overview ==
Event	Gold	Silver	Bronze
Men's Lead	(Spain) Ramón Julián Puigblanqué	(Austria) Jakob Schubert	(Czech Republic) Adam Ondra
Men's Bouldering	(Russia) Dmitrii Sharafutdinov	(Czech Republic) Adam Ondra	(Russia) Rustam Gelmanov
Men's Speed	(China) QiXin Zhong	(Russia) Stanislav Kokorin	(Ukraine) Danyil Boldyrev
Women's Lead	(Austria) Angela Eiter	(South Korea) Jain Kim	(Austria) Magdalena Röck
Women's Bouldering	(Austria) Anna Stöhr	(United States) Sasha DiGiulian	(Germany) Juliane Wurm
Women's Speed	(Russia) Mariia Krasavina	(Russia) Anna Tsyganova	(Kazakhstan) Tamara Ulzhabayeva

== Lead ==
=== Women ===
73 athletes attended the women's lead competition.

Rank	Name	Score
1	(Austria) Angela Eiter	53+
2	(South Korea) Jain Kim	47-
3	(Austria) Magdalena Röck	47-
4	(Austria) Johanna Ernst	47-
5	(Austria) Katharina Posch	47-
6	(Slovenia) Mina Markovič	47-
7	(Austria) Christine Schranz	47-
8	(United States) Sasha DiGiulian	47-

=== Men ===
130 athletes attended the men's lead competition.

Rank	Name	Score
1	(Spain) Ramón Julián Puigblanqué	Top
2	(Austria) Jakob Schubert	50-
3	(Czech Republic) Adam Ondra	50-
4	(Norway) Magnus Midtbø	45-
5	(France) Manuel Romain	41-
6	(South Korea) Hyunbin Min	39-
7	(Russia) Evgeny Ovchinnikov	25-
8	(Russia) Evgenii Zazulin	23-

== Bouldering ==
=== Women ===
69 athletes attended the women's bouldering competition.

Rank	Name	Score
1	(Austria) Anna Stöhr	4t6 4b6
2	(United States) Sasha DiGiulian	2t2 3b3
3	(Germany) Juliane Wurm	2t2 3b7
4	(Russia) Yana Chereshneva	2t3 4b10
5	(Japan) Akiyo Noguchi	2t4 3b5
6	(Russia) Olga Bibik	1t1 3b3

=== Men ===
139 athletes attended the men's bouldering competition.

Rank	Name	Score
1	(Russia) Dmitrii Sharafutdinov	4t5 4b4
2	(Czech Republic) Adam Ondra	4t8 4b8
3	(Russia) Rustam Gelmanov	4t12 4b12
4	(Austria) Kilian Fischhuber	2t8 3b9
5	(Switzerland) Cédric Lachat	2t10 3b20
6	(Germany) Thomas Tauporn	1t6 2b6

== Speed ==
=== Women ===
55 athletes competed in the women's speed climbing event.

Round of 16
1	(Russia) Mariia Krasavina	9.930
16	(Ukraine) Oleksandra BUD Gusaim	11.860
8	(Poland) Edyta Ropek	9.750
9	(France) Anouck Jaubert	13.910
4	(Russia) Kseniia Alekseeva	10.400
13	(Ukraine) Anastasiya Savisko	fall
5	(China) CuiLian He	10.610
12	(Venezuela) Lucelia Blanco	11.080
2	(Russia) Anna Tsyganova	10.100
15	(Poland) Monika Prokopiuk	10.850
7	(Italy) Sara Morandi	11.610
10	(Russia) Yuliya Levochkina	10.190
3	(France) Margot Heitz	12.110
14	(Kazakhstan) Tamara Ulzhabayeva	10.920
6	(Russia) Natalia Titova	9.840
11	(Indonesia) Evi Neliwati	fall

Quarterfinals
1	(Russia) Mariia Krasavina	9.750
8	(Poland) Edyta Ropek	9.770
4	(Russia) Kseniia Alekseeva	13.110
5	(China) CuiLian He	10.090
2	(Russia) Anna Tsyganova	9.610
10	(Russia) Yuliya Levochkina	fall
14	(Kazakhstan) Tamara Ulzhabayeva	10.800
6	(Russia) Natalia Titova	fall

Semifinals
1	(Russia) Mariia Krasavina	9.570
5	(China) CuiLian He	10.330
2	(Russia) Anna Tsyganova	10.180
14	(Kazakhstan) Tamara Ulzhabayeva	15.060

Final
1	(Russia) Mariia Krasavina	9.880
2	(Russia) Anna Tsyganova	11.280
Small final
5	(China) CuiLian He	12.610
14	(Kazakhstan) Tamara Ulzhabayeva	11.240

=== Men ===
73 athletes competed in the men's speed climbing event.

Round of 16
1	(Russia) Sergey Abdrakhmanov	6.830
16	(Kazakhstan) Alexandr Nigmatulin	7.260
8	(Iran) Hamidreza Toozandehjani	7.350
9	(Russia) Stanislav Kokorin	6.950
4	(Russia) Ivan Novikov	6.510
13	(Russia) Evgenii Vaitsekhovskii	6.970
5	(Kazakhstan) Sayat Bokanov	8.060
12	(Poland) Lukasz Swirk	7.320
2	(Czech Republic) Libor Hroza	7.280
15	(Kazakhstan) Artyom Devyaterikov	7.600
7	(Ukraine) Danyil Boldyrev	6.810
10	(Poland) Jedrzej Komosinski	7.010
3	(China) QiXin Zhong	6.690
14	(Poland) Marcin Dzieński	fall
6	(Ukraine) Yaroslav Gontaryk	7.830
11	(Venezuela) Erik Noya	7.550

Quarterfinals
1	(Russia) Sergey Abdrakhmanov	fall
9	(Russia) Stanislav Kokorin	6.680
4	(Russia) Ivan Novikov	6.510
12	(Poland) Lukasz Swirk	6.930
2	(Czech Republic) Libor Hroza	6.690
7	(Ukraine) Danyil Boldyrev	6.670
3	(China) QiXin Zhong	6.740
11	(Venezuela) Erik Noya	9.910

Semifinals
9	(Russia) Stanislav Kokorin	6.870
4	(Russia) Ivan Novikov	fall
7	(Ukraine) Danyil Boldyrev	7.660
3	(China) QiXin Zhong	6.820

Final
9	(Russia) Stanislav Kokorin	6.300
3	(China) QiXin Zhong	6.260
Small final
4	(Russia) Ivan Novikov	fall
7	(Ukraine) Danyil Boldyrev	6.660
