= 2019 IFSC Climbing World Championships =

Competition climbing event in Hachioji, Japan

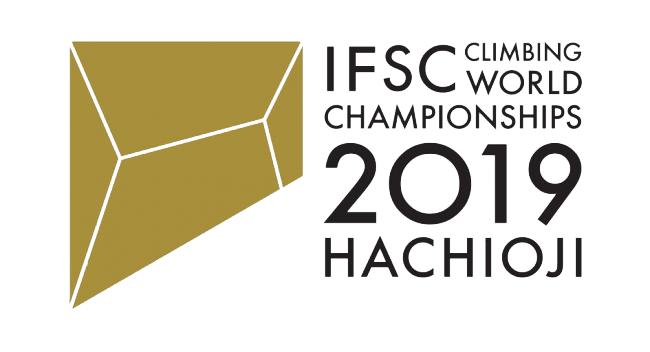
- Official event logo
- Venue: Esforta Arena in Hachioji
- Location: Hachioji, Japan
- Date: 11–21 August 2019
- Competitors: 253 athletes from 39 nations
- Website: https://jmsca-itadaki.com/s/n93w/

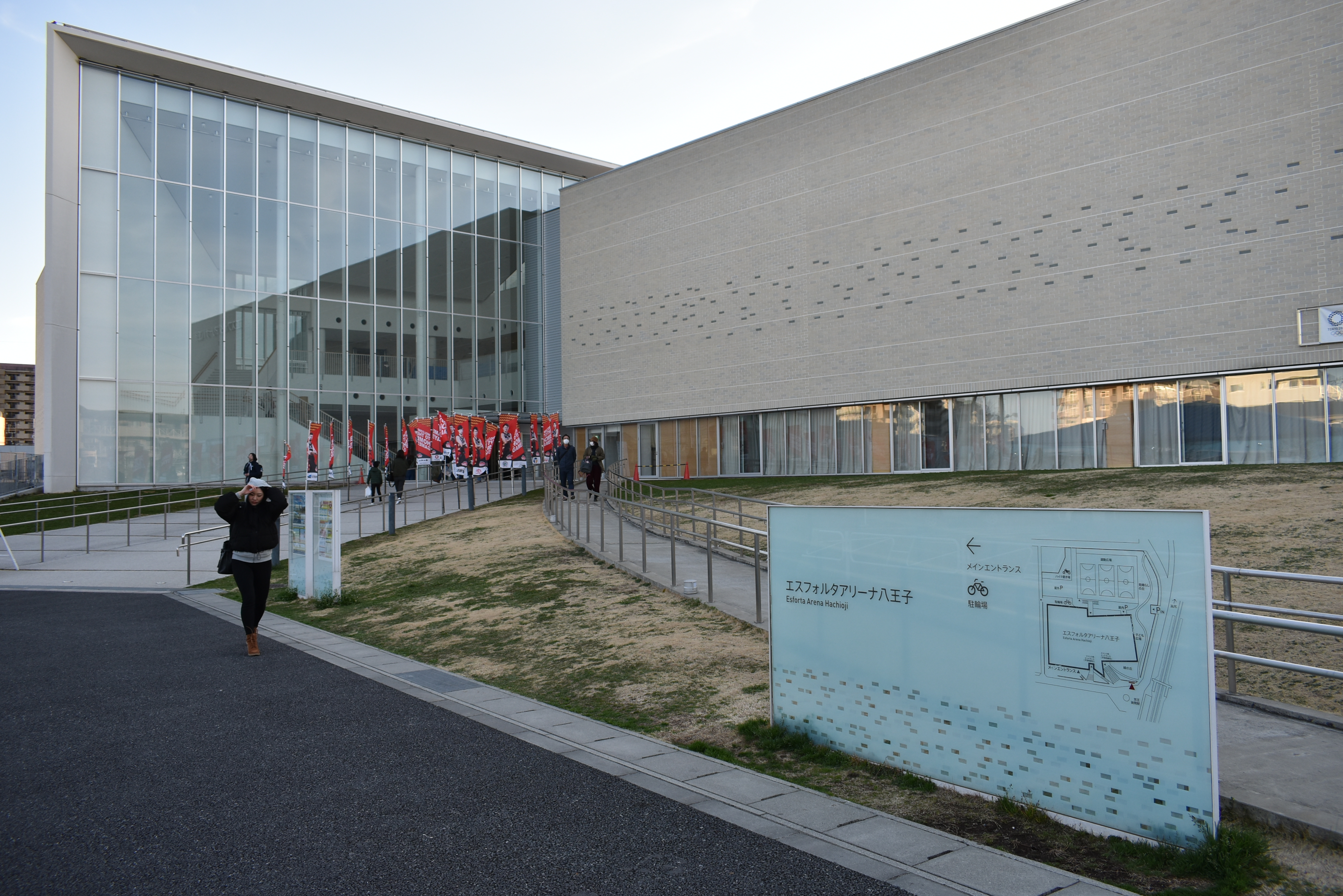
Ésforta Arena Hachioji, the event venue

The 2019 IFSC Climbing World Championships, the 16th edition, were held in Hachioji, Japan from 11 to 21 August 2019. The championships consisted of lead, speed, bouldering, and combined events. The paraclimbing event was held separately from 16 to 17 July in Briançon, France. The combined event also served as an Olympic qualifying event for the 2020 Summer Olympics.

== Medal summary ==
=== Medalists ===
Event	Gold	Silver	Bronze
Men's Lead	Adam Ondra (CZE)	Alexander Megos (GER)	Jakob Schubert (AUT)
Men's Bouldering	Tomoa Narasaki (JPN)	Jakob Schubert (AUT)	Yannick Flohé (GER)
Men's Speed	Ludovico Fossali (ITA)	Jan Kriz (CZE)	Stanislav Kokorin (RUS)
Men's Combined	Tomoa Narasaki (JPN)	Jakob Schubert (AUT)	Rishat Khaibullin (KAZ)
Women's Lead	Janja Garnbret (SLO)	Mia Krampl (SLO)	Ai Mori (JPN)
Women's Bouldering	Janja Garnbret (SLO)	Akiyo Noguchi (JPN)	Shauna Coxsey (GBR)
Women's Speed	Aleksandra Mirosław (POL)	Di Niu (CHN)	Anouck Jaubert (FRA)
Women's Combined	Janja Garnbret (SLO)	Akiyo Noguchi (JPN)	Shauna Coxsey (GBR)

=== Medal table ===
* Host nation (Japan)

Rank	Nation	Gold	Silver	Bronze	Total
1	Slovenia	3	1	0	4
2	Japan*	2	2	1	5
3	Czech Republic	1	1	0	2
4	Italy	1	0	0	1
4	Poland	1	0	0	1
6	Austria	0	2	1	3
7	Germany	0	1	1	2
8	China	0	1	0	1
9	Great Britain	0	0	2	2
10	France	0	0	1	1
10	Kazakhstan	0	0	1	1
10	Russia	0	0	1	1
Totals (12 entries)		8	8	8	24

== Qualification for the 2020 Summer Olympics ==
The seven best climbers of the combined event automatically qualify for the 2020 Summer Olympics, where sport climbing will make its debut. There are seven spots available per gender, with a maximum of two spots per country.

The qualifiers for the 2020 Summer Olympics from the 2019 World Championships Combined events are:

2020 Summer Olympic qualification
Men	Women
Tomoa Narasaki (JPN); Jakob Schubert (AUT); Rishat Khaibullin (KAZ); Mickaël Mawem (FRA); Alexander Megos (GER); Ludovico Fossali (ITA); Sean McColl (CAN); Kai Harada (JPN)*	Janja Garnbret (SLO); Akiyo Noguchi (JPN); Shauna Coxsey (GBR); Aleksandra Mirosław (POL); Petra Klingler (SUI); Brooke Raboutou (USA); Jessica Pilz (AUT); Miho Nonaka (JPN)*

* Japan, as the host nation, were guaranteed two quota places in each event. However, despite four climbers of each gender being in qualification positions in Hachioji, only two athletes of each gender could receive Olympic invitations. Harada and Nonaka were later named after some debate as to whether the Japanese team could choose their two athletes, or whether the spots must go to the top two qualifying athletes.

== Schedule ==
All times and dates use Japan Standard Time (UTC+9)

Q	Qualifications	SF	Semi-finals	F	Finals

B	Bouldering	L	Lead	S	Speed	C	Combined

August 2019	11th Sun	12th Mon	13th Tue		14th Wed	15th Thu		16th Fri	17th Sat		18th Sun	19th Mon	20th Tue	21st Wed
Men		B	B	B	L	L	L	Rest day	S	S		C		C
Women	B		B	B	L	L	L	Rest day	S	S	C		C	

== Bouldering ==
=== Women ===
Rank	Name	Qualification	Semi-Final	Final
1	(Slovenia) Janja Garnbret	5t5z 5 5	3t4z 7 6	3T3z 8 8
2	(Japan) Akiyo Noguchi	5t5z 9 9	2t4z 3 8	2T2z 4 2
3	(United Kingdom) Shauna Coxsey	3t5z 6 9	0t3z 0 6	2T2z 6 6
4	(Ukraine) Ievgeniia Kazbekova	4t5z 14 14	1t2z 2 3	1T2z 3 4
5	(Japan) Miho Nonaka	3t4z 4 8	0t3z 0 5	1T2z 5 6
6	(Japan) Nanako Kura	5t5z 12 10	1t2z 1 5	0T1z 0 1

=== Men ===
Rank	Name	Qualification	Semi-Final	Final
1	(Japan) Tomoa Narasaki	4t4z 8 5	2t4z 2 4	2T4z 12 20
2	(Austria) Jakob Schubert	3t4z 5 6	1t4z 3 12	0T3z 0 10
3	(Germany) Yannick Flohé	3t5z 5 14	2t4z 13 16	0T3z 0 13
4	(Japan) Kokoro Fujii	4t4z 5 5	2t4z 5 6	0T3z 0 18
5	(Japan) Keita Dohi	3t5z 6 8	2t4z 5 10	0T2z 0 9
6	(Czech Republic) Adam Ondra	5t5z 6 6	3t4z 11 7	0T0z 0 0

== Lead ==
=== Women ===
Rank	Name	Qualification					Semi-Final	Final
Rank	Name	Route 1		Route 2		Points	Semi-Final	Final
Rank	Name	Score	Rank	Score	Rank	Points	Semi-Final	Final
1	(Slovenia) Janja Garnbret	TOP	1	TOP	1	1.22	38+	43+
2	(Slovenia) Mia Krampl	35+	6	32	7	7.35	34	39+
3	(Japan) Ai Mori	39+	2	TOP	1	1.73	34+	38+
4	(South Korea) Seo Chae-hyun	34	8	38	4	5.66	32	38+
5	(Japan) Akiyo Noguchi	34+	7	33+	6	6.48	32	38+
6	(Austria) Jessica Pilz	37+	3	31+	12	8.26	30+	35+
7	(Slovenia) Vita Lukan	28	21	31+	12	21.18	35	30+
8	(France) Julia Chanourdie	31+	10	31+	12	14.97	30+	30+

=== Men ===
Rank	Name	Qualification					Semi-Final	Final
Rank	Name	Route 1		Route 2		Points	Semi-Final	Final
Rank	Name	Score	Rank	Score	Rank	Points	Semi-Final	Final
1	(Czech Republic) Adam Ondra	TOP	1	31	22	9.07	37+	34+
2	(Germany) Alex Megos	TOP	1	32+	7	6.06	40+	33+
3	(Austria) Jakob Schubert	TOP	1	TOP	1	3.50	30+	33+
4	(Japan) Tomoa Narasaki	TOP	1	TOP	1	3.50	38	30
5	(Canada) Sean McColl	31+	9	TOP	1	5.61	37+	30
6	(Italy) Stefano Ghisolfi	28+	18	TOP	1	8.05	29+	29+
7	(Japan) Kai Harada	32+	8	TOP	1	5.29	31+	28+
8	(Sweden) Hannes Puman	29+	11	32+	7	11.68	29+	27+

== Speed ==
=== Women ===
Aleksandra Miroslaw won the women's speed final against Di Niu. In the small final Anouck Jaubert (7.534) won against YiLing Song (9.768) and secured the third place.

Round of 16
1	Aleksandra Mirosław (POL)	7.472
16	MingWei Ni (CHN)	7.819
8	Patrycja Chudziak (POL)	8.114
9	Elena Remizova (RUS)	fall
4	Iuliia Kaplina (RUS)	8.465
13	Aleksandra Kałucka (POL)	7.789
5	YiLing Song (CHN)	7.436
12	Anna Brożek (POL)	7.945
2	Mariia Krasavina (RUS)	7.454
15	Andrea Rojas (ECU)	8.202
7	Natalia Kałucka (POL)	7.895
10	Di Niu (CHN)	7.871
3	Anouck Jaubert (FRA)	8.409
14	Aurelia Sarisson (FRA)	10.504
6	Elizaveta Ivanova (RUS)	7.747
11	PeiYang Tian (CHN)	8.080

Quarter-finals
Aleksandra Mirosław (POL)	7.337
Patrycja Chudziak (POL)	8.008
Aleksandra Kałucka (POL)	7.605
YiLing Song (CHN)	7.192
Mariia Krasavina (RUS)	7.998
Di Niu (CHN)	7.814
Anouck Jaubert (FRA)	7.663
Elizaveta Ivanova (RUS)	10.188

Semi-finals
Aleksandra Mirosław (POL)	7.337
YiLing Song (CHN)	fall
Di Niu (CHN)	7.525
Anouck Jaubert (FRA)	7.535

Final
Aleksandra Mirosław (POL)	7.129
Di Niu (CHN)	8.363
Small final
YiLing Song (CHN)	9.76
Anouck Jaubert (FRA)	7.53

=== Men ===
Ludovico Fossali won the men's speed final against Jan Kriz. In the small final Stanislav Kokorin (5.835) won against Danyil Boldyrev (5.934) and secured the third place.

Round of 16
1	Dmitrii Timofeev (RUS)	6.150
16	Stanislav Kokorin (RUS)	5.944
8	Sergey Rukin (RUS)	fall
9	Kostiantyn Pavlenko (UKR)	6.232
4	Reza Alipour (IRI)	6.281
13	John Brosler (USA)	9.383
5	Long Cao (CHN)	6.441
12	Jan Kriz (CZE)	6.136
2	Vladislav Deulin (RUS)	5.612
15	QiXin Zhong (CHN)	5.580
7	Amir Maimuratov (KAZ)	fall
10	Ludovico Fossali (ITA)	5.908
3	Bassa Mawem (FRA)	7.470
14	Rishat Khaibullin (KAZ)	7.013
6	Danyil Boldyrev (UKR)	5.940
11	ZhiYong Ou (CHN)	6.072

Quarter-finals
Stanislav Kokorin (RUS)	5.808
Kostiantyn Pavlenko (UKR)	5.863
Reza Alipour (IRI)	7.248
Jan Kriz (CZE)	6.219
QiXin Zhong (CHN)	FS
Ludovico Fossali (ITA)	WC
Rishat Khaibullin (KAZ)	7.613
Danyil Boldyrev (UKR)	7.500

Semi-finals
Stanislav Kokorin (RUS)	fall
Jan Kriz (CZE)	5.986
Ludovico Fossali (ITA)	WC
Danyil Boldyrev (UKR)	FS

Final
Jan Kriz (CZE)	fall
Ludovico Fossali (ITA)	6.871
Small final
Stanislav Kokorin (RUS)	5.83
Danyil Boldyrev (UKR)	5.93

WC – Wildcard
FS – False start

== Combined ==
Climbers who participated in all three events of bouldering, lead, and speed would receive a combined ranking, and the top 20 of each gender would automatically qualify for the combined event.

In combined competition, scoring is based on a multiplication formula, with points awarded by calculating the product of the three finishing ranks achieved in each discipline within the combined event. A competitor finishing with a first, a second and a sixth would thus be awarded 1 x 2 x 6 = 12 points, with the lowest scoring competitor winning.

=== Women ===
Rank	Name	Points	Speed		Bouldering		Lead	
Rank	Name	Points	Rank	Time	Rank	Score	Rank	Holds
1	(Slovenia) Janja Garnbret	12.00	6	13.399	2	1T2z 1 2	1	Top
2	(Japan) Akiyo Noguchi	21.00	7	10.082	1	2T2z 3 3	3	40+
3	(United Kingdom) Shauna Coxsey	42.00	2	9.225	3	1T2z 2 3	7	20
4	(Poland) Aleksandra Mirosław	64.00	1	7.750	8	0T0z 0 0	8	10
5	(Japan) Miho Nonaka	80.00	4	12.356	4	1T2z 3 4	5	23+
6	(Japan) Ai Mori	80.00	8	12.860	5	1T2z 3 7	2	Top
7	(Japan) Futaba Ito	120.00	5	8.655	6	0T2z 0 2	4	27
8	(Switzerland) Petra Klingler	126.00	3	8.901	7	0T2z 0 3	6	23+

=== Men ===
Rank	Name	Points	Speed		Bouldering		Lead	
Rank	Name	Points	Rank	Time	Rank	Score	Rank	Holds
1	(Japan) Tomoa Narasaki	4.00	2	fall	1	3T3z 4 3	2	30
2	(Austria) Jakob Schubert	35.00	7	7.208	5	0T3z 0 6	1	Top
3	(Kazakhstan) Rishat Khaibullin	40.00	1	5.915	8	0T1z 0 2	5	22
4	(Japan) Kai Harada	54.00	3	6.348	6	0T2z 0 6	3	30
5	(Japan) Meichi Narasaki	60.00	5	6.689	2	1T3z 1 4	6	21
6	(Japan) Kokoro Fujii	72.00	6	9.438	3	1T3z 2 6	4	29+
7	(France) Mickaël Mawem	112.00	4	6.716	4	1T2z 3 4	7	20
8	(Germany) Alexander Megos	448.00	8	7.570	7	0T1z 0 1	8	0

== See also ==
- IFSC Paraclimbing World Championships
- Sport climbing at the 2020 Summer Olympics
