= Reza Alipour =

Iranian speed climber from Qazvin

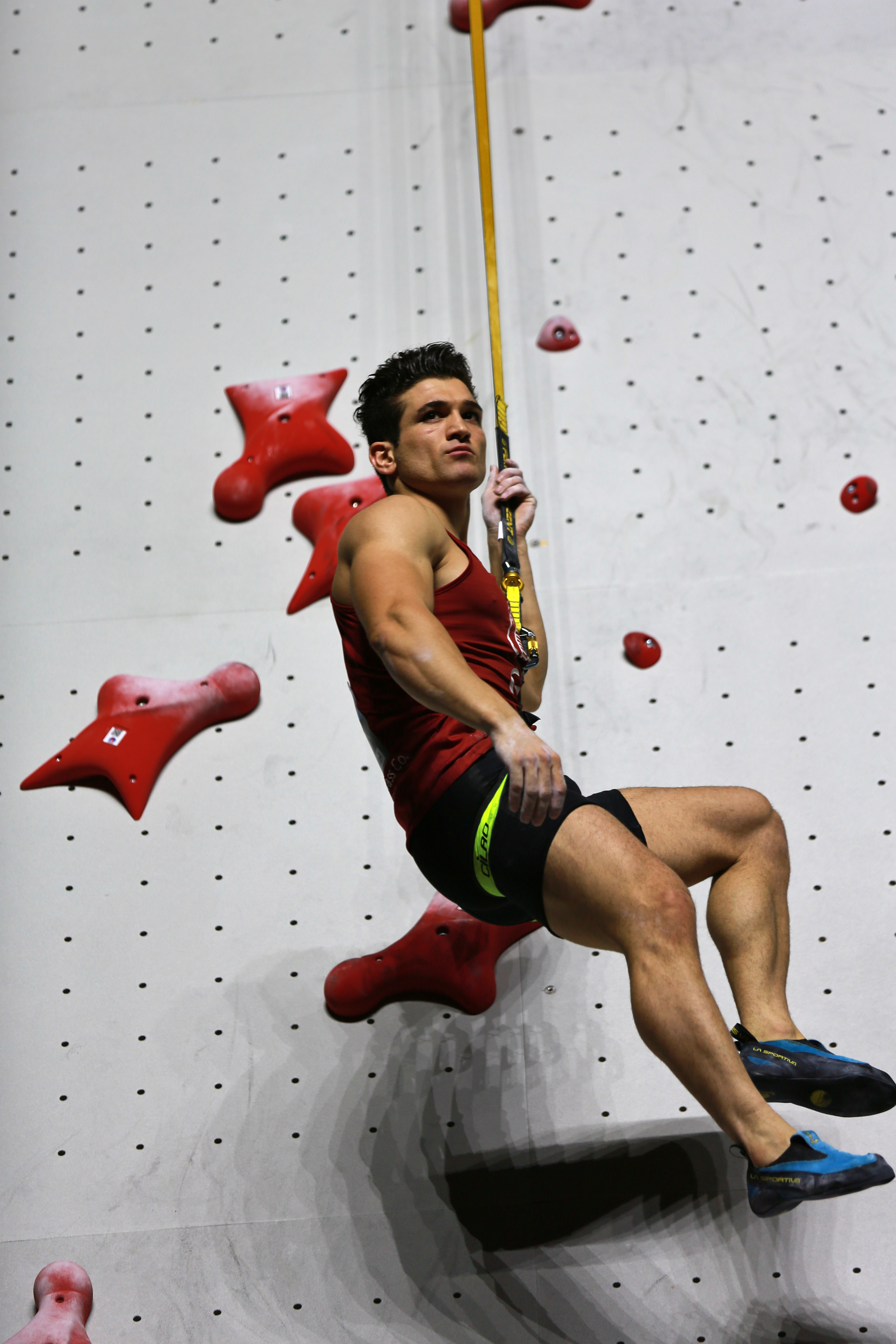
- Alipour in 2018

Personal information
- Native name: رضا علی‌پور شنازندی‌فرد
- Full name: Reza Alipour Shenazandifard
- Nickname: Persian Cheetah
- Nationality: Iran
- Born: 29 April 1994 (age 32) Qazvin, Iran
- Years active: 2011–present
- Height: 1.70 m (5 ft 7 in)
- Weight: 76 kg (168 lb)

Sport
- Country: Iran
- Sport: Competition climbing
- Event: Speed
Medal record
Men's competition climbing
Representing Iran
Event	1st	2nd	3rd
World Championship	1	1	1
World Games	1	0	0
World Cup	6	2	6
Asian Games	2	1	0
Asian Championships	1	2	1
World Games
Gold medal – first place	2017 Wrocław	Speed
World Championships
Gold medal – first place	2018 Innsbruck	Speed
Silver medal – second place	2016 Paris	Speed
Bronze medal – third place	2014 Gijón	Speed
Asian Games
Gold medal – first place	2018 Jakarta–Palembang	Speed
Gold medal – first place	2022 Hangzhou	Speed
Silver medal – second place	2026 Aichi–Nagoya	Speed
Asian Championships
Gold medal – first place	2017 Tehran	Speed
Silver medal – second place	2013 Tehran	Speed
Silver medal – second place	2015 Ningbo	Speed
Bronze medal – third place	2024 Tai'an	Speed

Reza Alipour Shenazandifard (Persian: رضا علی‌پور شنازندی‌فرد, born 29 April 1994) is an Iranian competition speed climber from Qazvin.

== Career ==
In 2014, in Spain, he registered 5.97 seconds and broke his own Iranian record in speed climbing. The International Federation of Sport Climbing (IFSC) titled him an Asiatic cheetah. On April 30, 2017, in Nanjing, China, as part of the 2017 IFSC Climbing World Cup, Alipour set a new world record; scaling a 15-meter wall in 5.48 seconds, snatching the gold medal, and beating the previous record of 5.60 seconds held by Ukraine's Danyil Boldyrev.

He was crowned the 2017 International World Games Association (IWGA) Athlete of the Year. Alipour received 90,790 votes in the contest, with second place going to Ukrainian powerlifter Larysa Soloviova, who scored 90,036.

He also finished in first place at the 18th Asian Games in Palembang in Men's Speed Climbing competition, Zhong Qixin from China won the silver medal, and bronze medal went to Indonesian climber Aspar Jaelolo. Iranian speed climber Reza Alipour seat top at the latest 2018 World Ranking published by International Federation of Sport Climbing IFSC and collecting 324.68 points and Bassa Mawem of France and Dmitrii Timofeev of Russia stand next with 318.59 and 316.01 points respectively

On the third day of the 2024 Olympic qualifiers held in Budapest, Alipour qualified for the Paris 2024 Olympics by scoring 61 points in the two qualifiers of China and Hungary.

Alipour advanced to the knockout stage with a run time of 5.06 seconds as the fastest elimination heat loser of the men's speed climbing in the 2024 Olympic Games. Alipour finished in the fourth place after he lost to American Samuel Watson in the bronze medal match. Watson won bronze with a world record time of 4.74 seconds.

== Personal life ==
Reza Alipour was born on 29 April 1994 in the city of Qazvin. His cousin, Mehdi, also competes as a speed climber.

== Major results ==
=== Olympic Games ===
Discipline	2024
Speed	4

=== World championships ===
Discipline	2014	2016	2018	2019	2021	2023
Speed	3	2	1	6	9	20

=== World Cup ===
Discipline	2013	2014	2015	2016	2017	2018	2019	2021	2022	2023	2024
Speed	13	16	7	5	2	4	6	22	22	25	39
Combined	—	—	—	—	13	—	—	—	—	—	

=== Asian championships ===
Discipline	2013	2014	2015	2016	2017	2018	2019	2022
Speed	2	4	2	8	1	47	14	4

== World Cup podiums ==
Season	Location	Discipline	Place
2013	Haiyang, China	Speed	1st
2013	Wujiang, China	Speed	2nd
2014	Chamonix, France	Speed	3rd
2015	Haiyang, China	Speed	3rd
2015	Wujiang, China	Speed	1st
2016	Nanjing, China	Speed	1st
2016	Chamonix, France	Speed	3rd
2017	Nanjing, China	Speed	1st
2017	Villars, Switzerland	Speed	1st
2017	Arco, Italy	Speed	2nd
2018	Moscow, Russia	Speed	1st
2018	Arco, Italy	Speed	3rd
2018	Wujiang, China	Speed	3rd
2018	Xiamen, China	Speed	3rd
