= Petra Klingler =

Swiss rock and ice climber

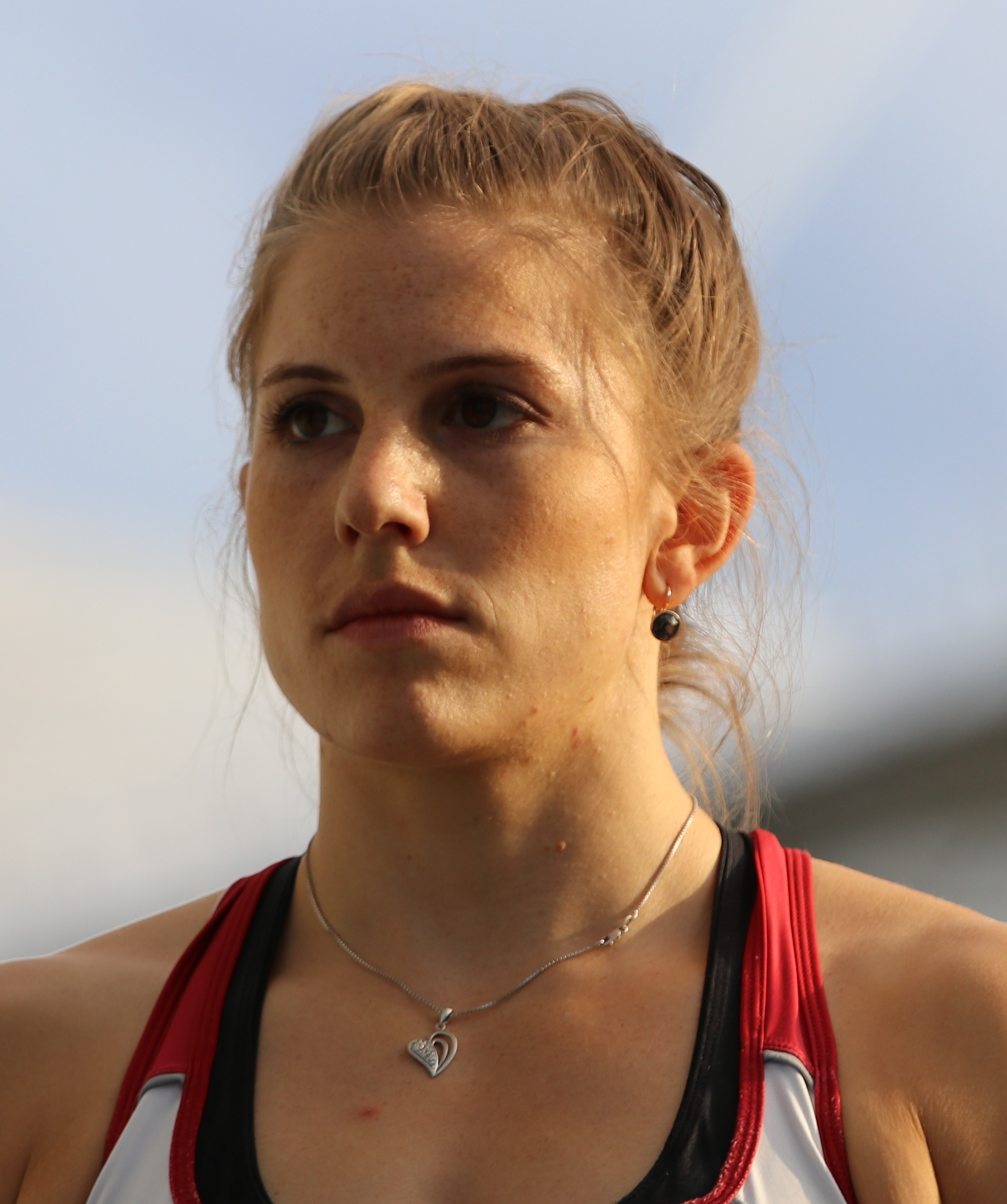
- Klingler at the Bouldering World Cup, Munich, 2017

Personal information
- Nationality: Swiss
- Born: 14 February 1992 (age 34)
- Occupations: Professional rock and ice climber
- Website: Petra Klinger

Climbing career
- Type of climber: Competition climbing; Competition ice climbing
- Known for: Winner of Bouldering World Championships in 2016
Medal record
Women's competition climbing
Representing Switzerland
World Championships
Gold medal – first place	2016 Paris	Bouldering
Silver medal – second place	2014 Munich/Gijón	Combined
Bronze medal – third place	2012 Paris	Combined

Petra Klingler (born 14 February 1992) is a Swiss rock climber and retired competition climber. Known as a versatile climber, she competed in a wide range of competitive events, including competition bouldering, speed climbing, lead climbing, and also ice climbing. She competed in the 2020 Olympics, finishing 16th.

== Early life ==
Klingler was born in Switzerland in 1992. She was born with clubfeet, which required casting as an infant.

Klingler is a third-generation climber and began climbing multipitch when she was six years old. She and her brother would spend weekends outdoors, while her parents and grandparents climbed, typically with three adults climbing and the other watching them. As a teenager, she tired of climbing with her parents and began going to gyms and entering competitions.

She was good at horse riding as a youth, but outgrew local competitions at 13 and began focusing on climbing instead. She was also involved in gymnastics, athletics, orienteering and boxing.

Klingler initially competed in lead climbing, but has since moved towards bouldering.

== Competition climbing career ==
Klingler was described as a "late bloomer" by climbing media after winning her first gold medal aged 23 in bouldering at the Haiyang leg of the 2015 IFSC Climbing World Cup. That same year she came third in lead climbing in the UIAA Ice Climbing World Championships, and second in lead climbing in the overall UIAA Ice Climbing World Cup.

In 2016, she studied Sports Science and Psychology at the University of Bern, while also training, typically doing 10 sessions a week. Klingler described her main gym as not ideal for bouldering, but perfect for systematic training. She pulled back from training a bit in 2018 to finish her degree, which she completed in 2019. Klingler won the 2016 IFSC Climbing World Championships for bouldering.

In 2017, she finished with a bronze medal in the UIAA Ice Climbing World Cup despite injuring her knee halfway up the final route. Klingler was in tears after stretching some ligaments and damaging her meniscus, but managed to continue up the route using only one leg.

In 2019, Klingler won the Swiss championships in all three competition climbing disciplines: lead, speed and bouldering, and qualified for the 2020 Summer Olympics during the 2019 IFSC Climbing World Championships. The Olympics was delayed until 2021 by the COVID-19 pandemic and she placed 16th of 20 competitors.

In 2022 she won the world Ice Climbing Championships, and took part in Red Bull Dual Ascent, an informal competition hosted by Red Bull on the Contra Dam featuring pairs of climbers on mirrored multi-pitch climbing routes. The next year, she announced her intent of trying to qualify for the 2024 Olympics as her last goal in competition, making the 2023 World Championships her last.

Klinger in competition
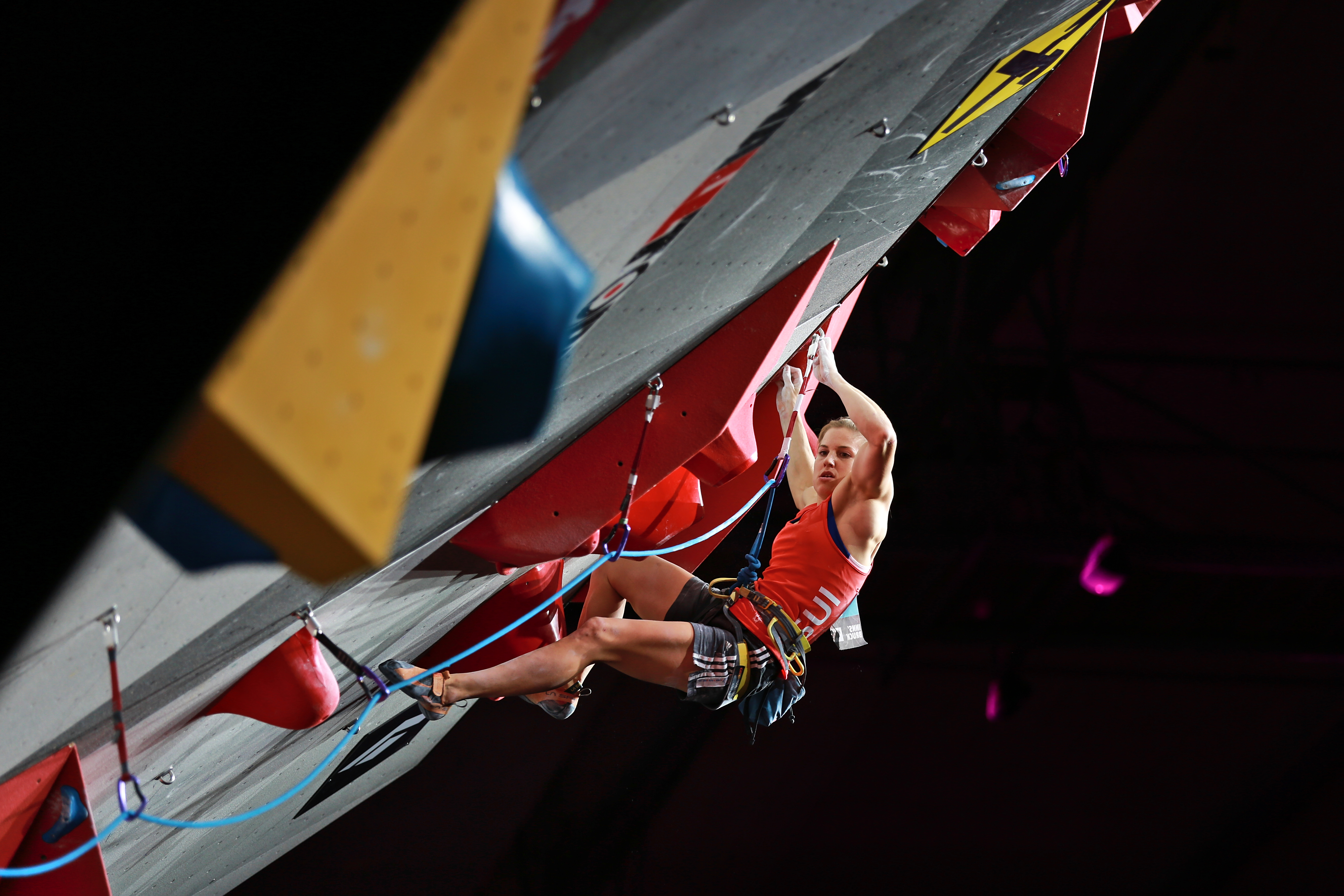
Klingler lead climbing in 2018

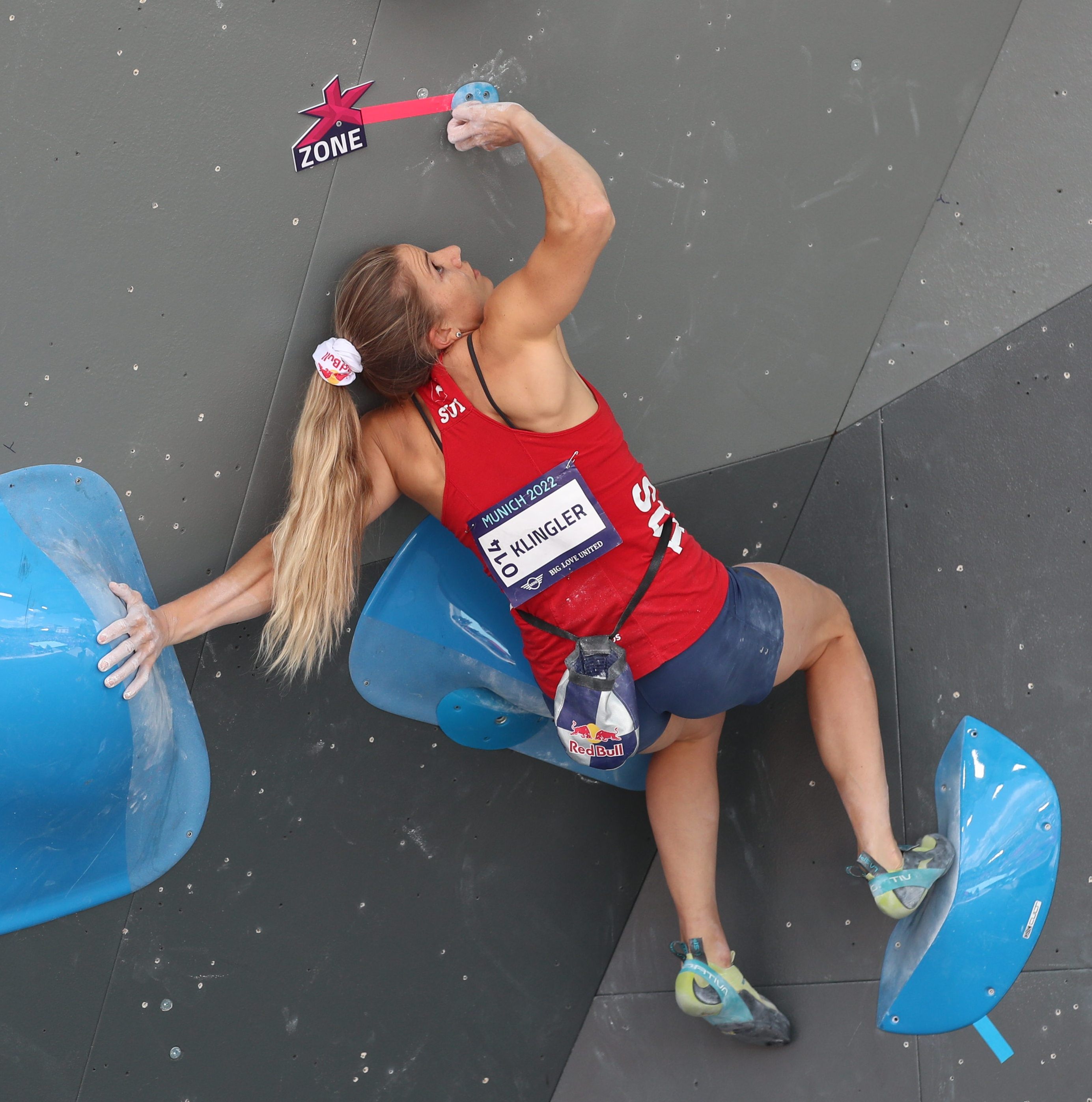
Klingler bouldering in 2022

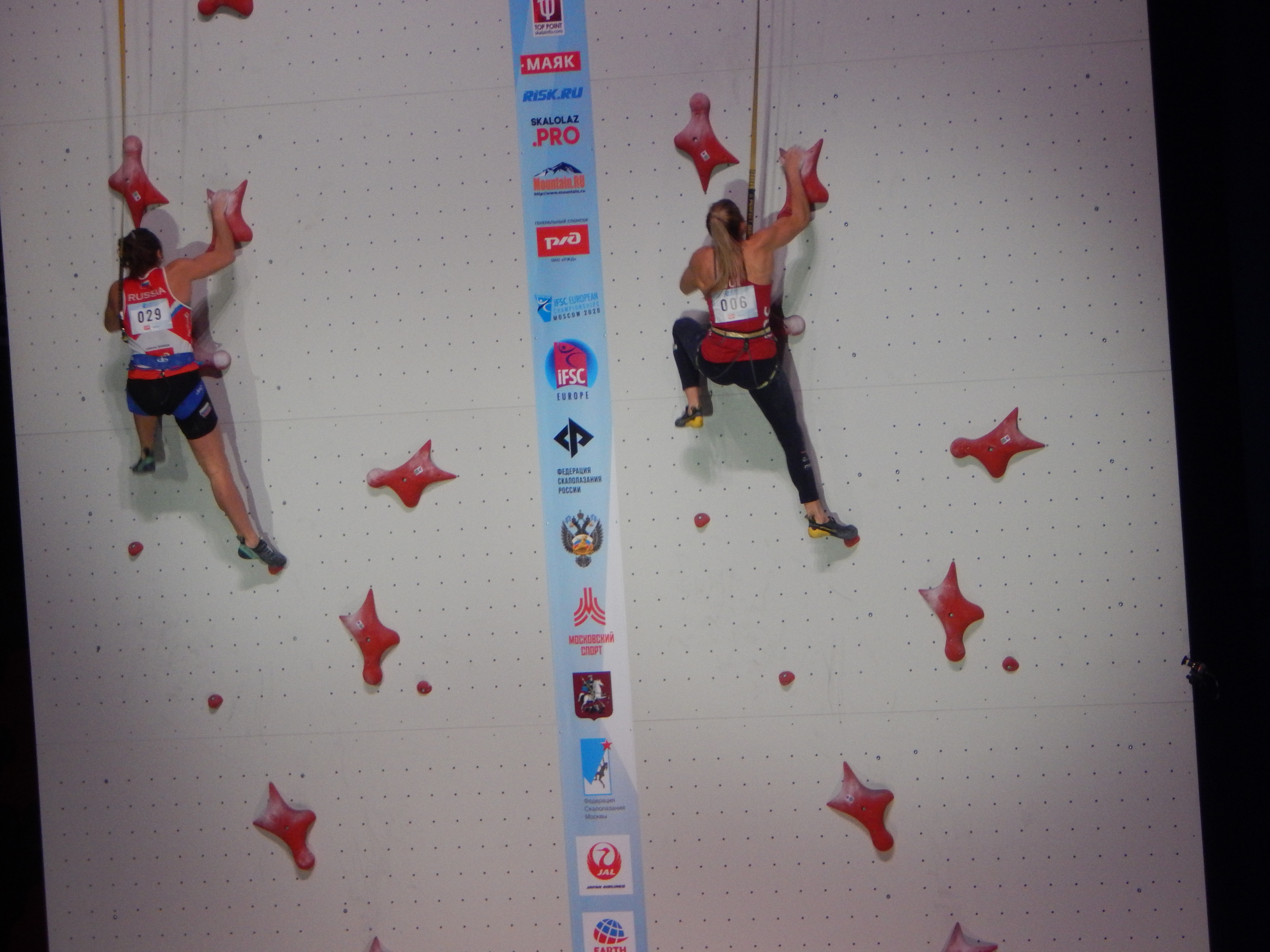
Klingler speed climbing in 2020

== Outdoor climbing ==
In 2024, she climbed one 8A and two 8A+ boulders in a day in Magic Wood, Switzerland.

== Notable climbs ==
8A+ (V12):

- Jacks Broken Heart – Magic Wood – 2024
- Unendliche Geschichte 1 – Magic Wood – 2024

8A (V11):

- Octopussy – Magic Wood – 2024

== Television ==
At the 2024 Olympics Klingler served as analyst for the English language broadcast of the Sport Climbing discipline.

== Rankings ==
=== Climbing World Cup ===
Discipline	2009	2010	2011	2012	2013	2014	2015	2016	2017	2018	2019
Lead	–	–	–	–	–	–	–	–	–	57	
Bouldering	41	26	13	25	16	11	4	8	5	15	6
Speed	–	–	31	–	–	38	–	–	–	58	
Combined	–	–	14	–	–	11	–	–	14	16	

=== Ice climbing world cup ===
Discipline	2009	2010	2011	2012	2013	2014	2015	2016	2017	2018	2019
Lead	–	–	27	15	15	9	2	5	17	24	17

=== Climbing World Championships ===
Adult

Discipline	2009	2011	2012	2014	2016	2018	2019	2023
Lead	–	–	27	15	–	13	29	–
Bouldering	30	29	7	8	1	6	10	13
Speed	–	–	23	27	–	33	37	–
Combined	–	–	–	–	–	6	8	–

=== Ice climbing world championships ===
Discipline	2015	2017	2019	2022
Lead	3	4	–	1

== Medals in the Climbing World Cup ==
=== Bouldering ===
Season	Gold	Silver	Bronze	Total
2015	1	–	–	1
Total	1	0	0	1

=== Ice climbing ===
Season	Gold	Silver	Bronze	Total
2015	1	1	2	4
2016	–	2	–	2
2017	–	–	1	1
2018	–	–	–	–
2019	–	–	1	1
Total	1	3	4	8
