= Manuel Cornu =

French rock climber

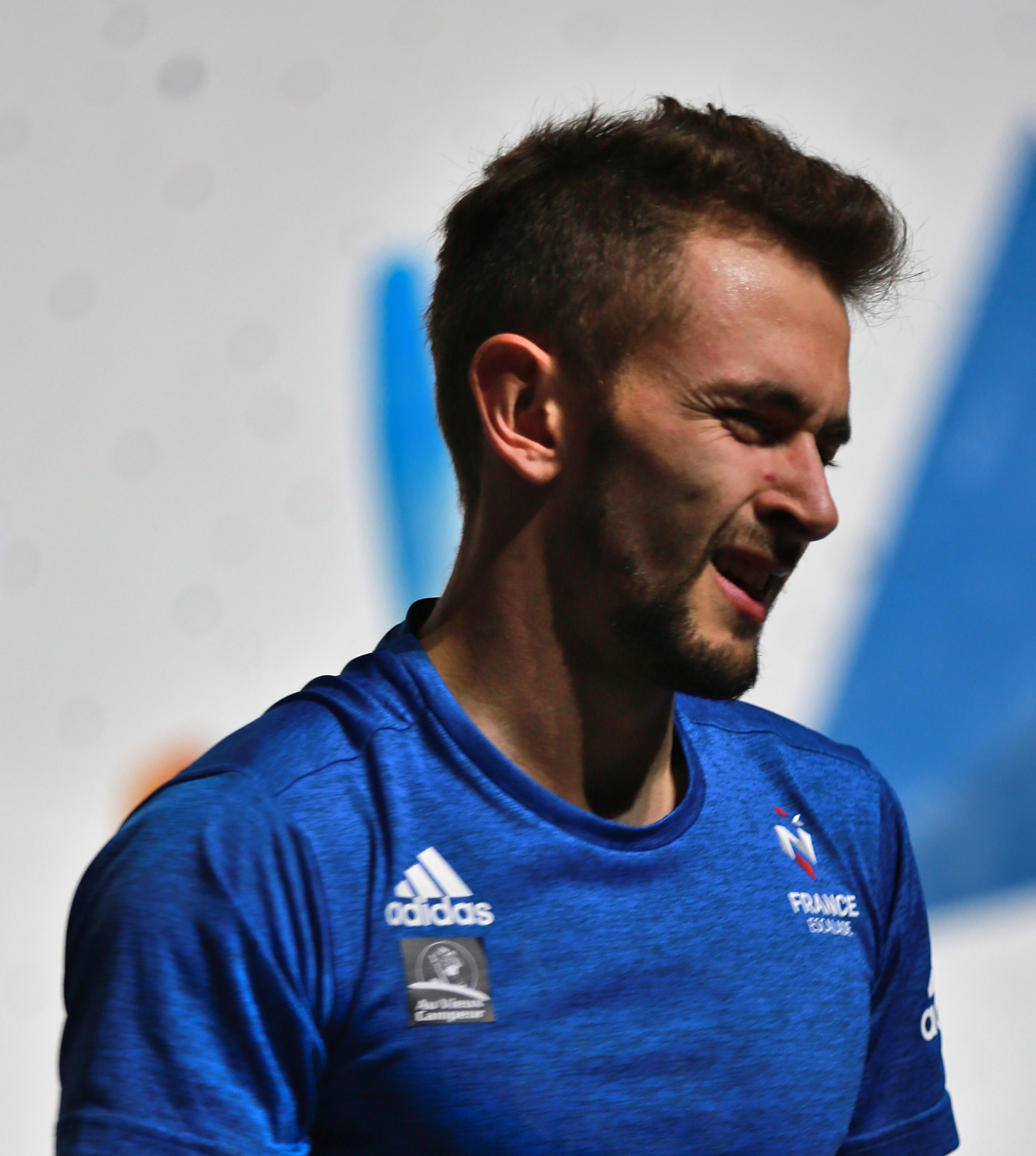
- Cornu in 2018

Personal information

Climbing career
- Type of climber: Competition climbing
Medal record
Men's competition climbing
Representing France
World Championships
Silver medal – second place	2016 Paris	Combined
Bronze medal – third place	2016 Paris	Bouldering
Bronze medal – third place	2021 Moscow	Bouldering
World Cup
Gold medal – first place	Chongqing 2019	Bouldering
Silver medal – second place	Prague 2024	Bouldering

Manuel Cornu is a French competition climber who specializes in competition bouldering. He participated at the 2016 and 2021 IFSC Climbing World Championships, being awarded two bronze medals and a silver medal in the men's bouldering and men's combined events.

On August 7 has opened Sport climbing at the 2024 Summer Olympics competition in Paris.

== See also ==
- List of grade milestones in rock climbing
- History of rock climbing
- Rankings of most career IFSC gold medals
