= Indonesia at the 2017 World Games =

- IOC code: INA
- NOC: Indonesian Olympic Committee

in Wrocław, Poland 20 July 2017 – 30 July 2017
- Competitors: 1 in 1 sport
- Medals: Gold 0 Silver 0 Bronze 0 Total 0

World Games appearances (overview)
- 1981; 1985; 1989; 1993; 1997; 2001; 2005; 2009; 2013; 2017; 2022; 2025

Indonesia competed at the World Games 2017 in Wrocław, Poland, from 20 July 2017 to 30 July 2017.

== Competitors ==
Sports	Men	Women	Total	Events
Sport climbing	1	0	1	1
Total	1	0	1	1

== Sport climbing ==
Indonesia has qualified at the 2017 World Games 1 athlete.

Athlete	Event	Qualifications		Quarterfinals	Semifinals	Final / BM	
Athlete	Event	Time	Place	Opposition Score	Opposition Score	Opposition Score	Rank
Ashari Fajri	Men's speed	6,55	10	did not advance			
