= Stanislav Kokorin =

Russian speed climber (born 1990)

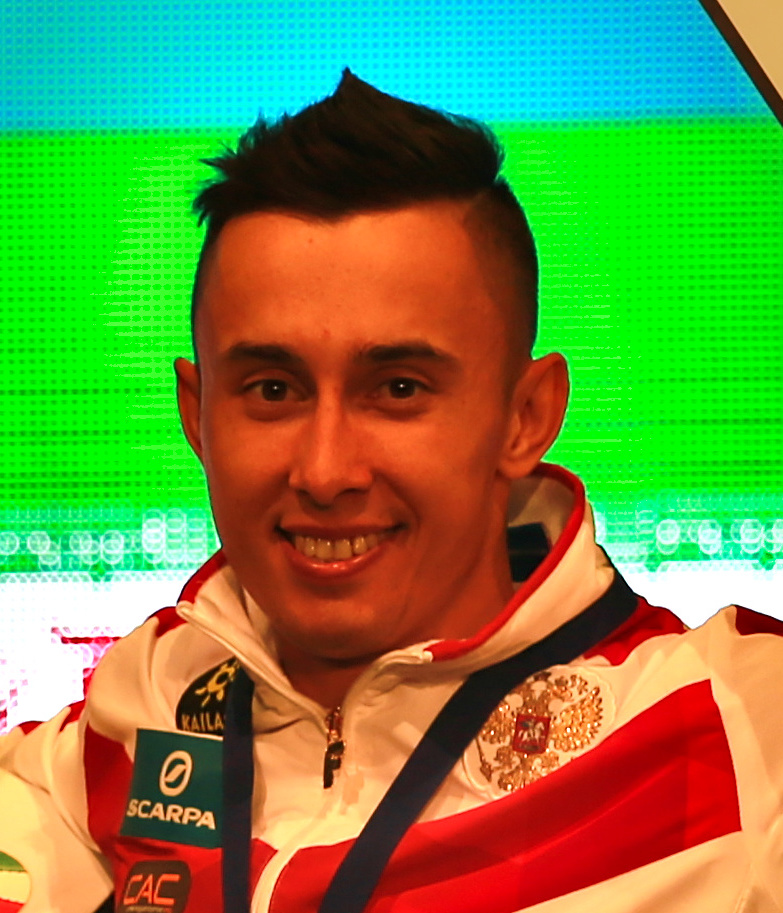
- Kokorin in 2018

Personal information
- Native name: Станислав Кокорин
- Nationality: Russia
- Born: 22 January 1990 (age 36) Tyumen, Soviet Union
- Height: 1.72 m (5 ft 8 in)
- Weight: 67 kg (148 lb)

Sport
- Sport: Competition climbing
- Event: Speed
Medal record
Men's competition climbing
Representing Russia
Event	1st	2nd	3rd
World Championship	–	2	2
World Games	–	1	1
World Cup	3	–	–
European Championships	–	1	1
World Championships
Silver medal – second place	2011 Arco	Speed
Silver medal – second place	2014 Gijón	Speed
Bronze medal – third place	2018 Innsbruck	Speed
Bronze medal – third place	2019 Hachioji	Speed
World Games
Silver medal – second place	2013 Cali	Speed
Bronze medal – third place	2017 Wrocław	Speed
European Championships
Silver medal – second place	2010 Innsbruck	Speed
Bronze medal – third place	2017 Campitello di Fassa	Speed
World Cup
Gold medal – first place	2010	Speed
Gold medal – first place	2012	Speed
Gold medal – first place	2013	Speed

Stanislav Kokorin (Russian: Станислав Кокорин; born 22 January 1990) is a Russian former competition speed climber. He took three overall titles in the IFSC World Cup, in 2010, 2012 and 2013, and won two silver and bronze medals each at the IFSC Climbing World Championships. He also won medals at the World Games and the IFSC European Championships. He retired at the end of 2019.

== See also ==
- Rankings of most career IFSC gold medals
