= Anouck Jaubert =

French speed climber (born 1994)

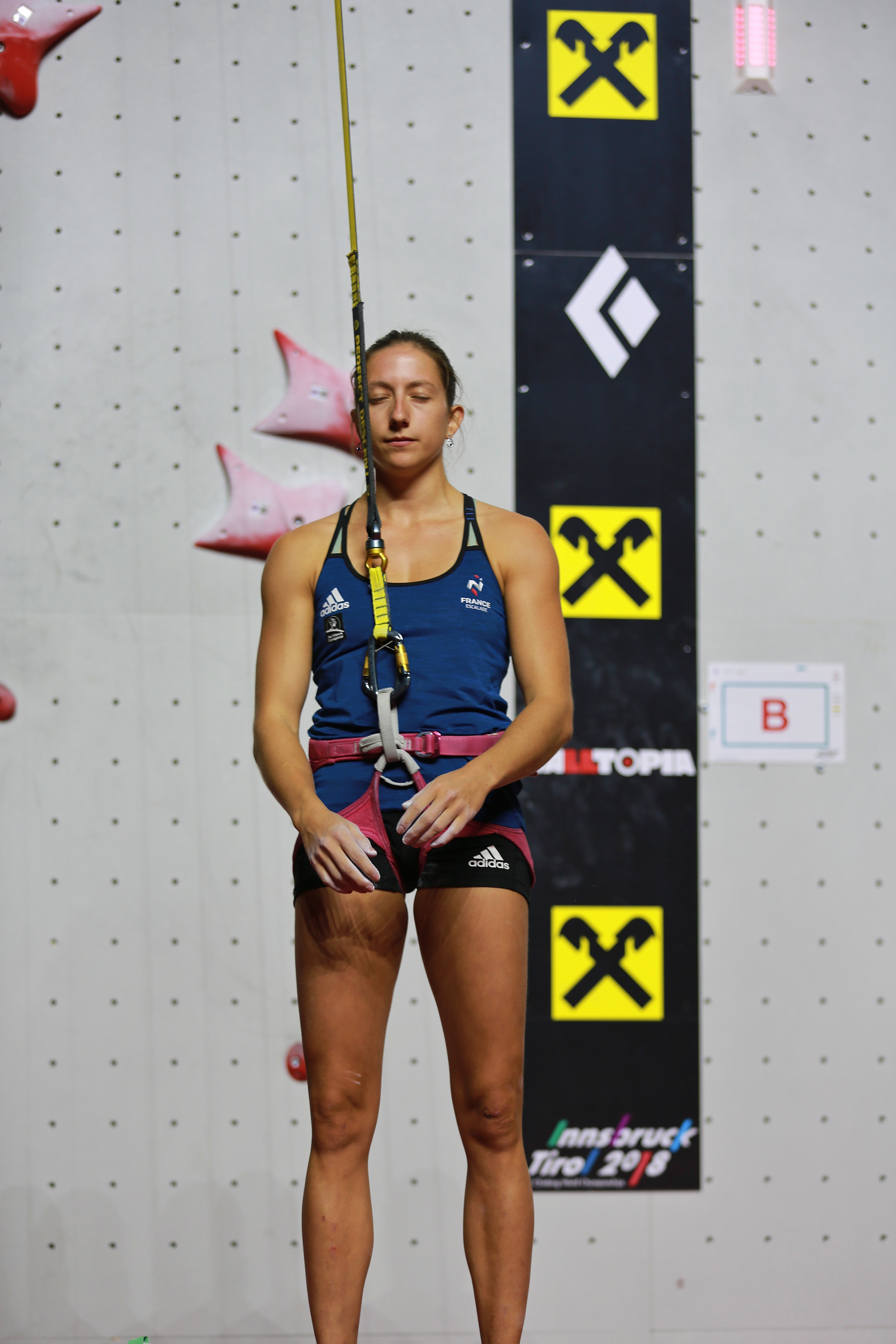
- Anouck Jaubert in 2018

Personal information
- Nationality: French
- Born: 27 January 1994 (age 32)

Climbing career
- Type of climber: Competition speed climbing
Medal record
Women's competition climbing
Representing France
World Games
Silver medal – second place	2017 Wrocław	Speed
World Championships
Silver medal – second place	2016 Paris	Speed
Bronze medal – third place	2019 Hachiōji	Speed

Anouck Jaubert (born 27 January 1994) is a French speed climber specialising in competition speed climbing competitions.

In 2017, she won the silver medal in the women's speed event at the World Games held in Wrocław, Poland. Four years earlier, she competed in the women's speed event at the 2013 World Games where she was eliminated in the quarter-finals by Yulia Kaplina of Russia.

She represented France at the 2020 Summer Olympics in Tokyo, Japan. She competed in the women's combined event.
