= Ludovico Fossali =

Italian speed climber (born 1997)

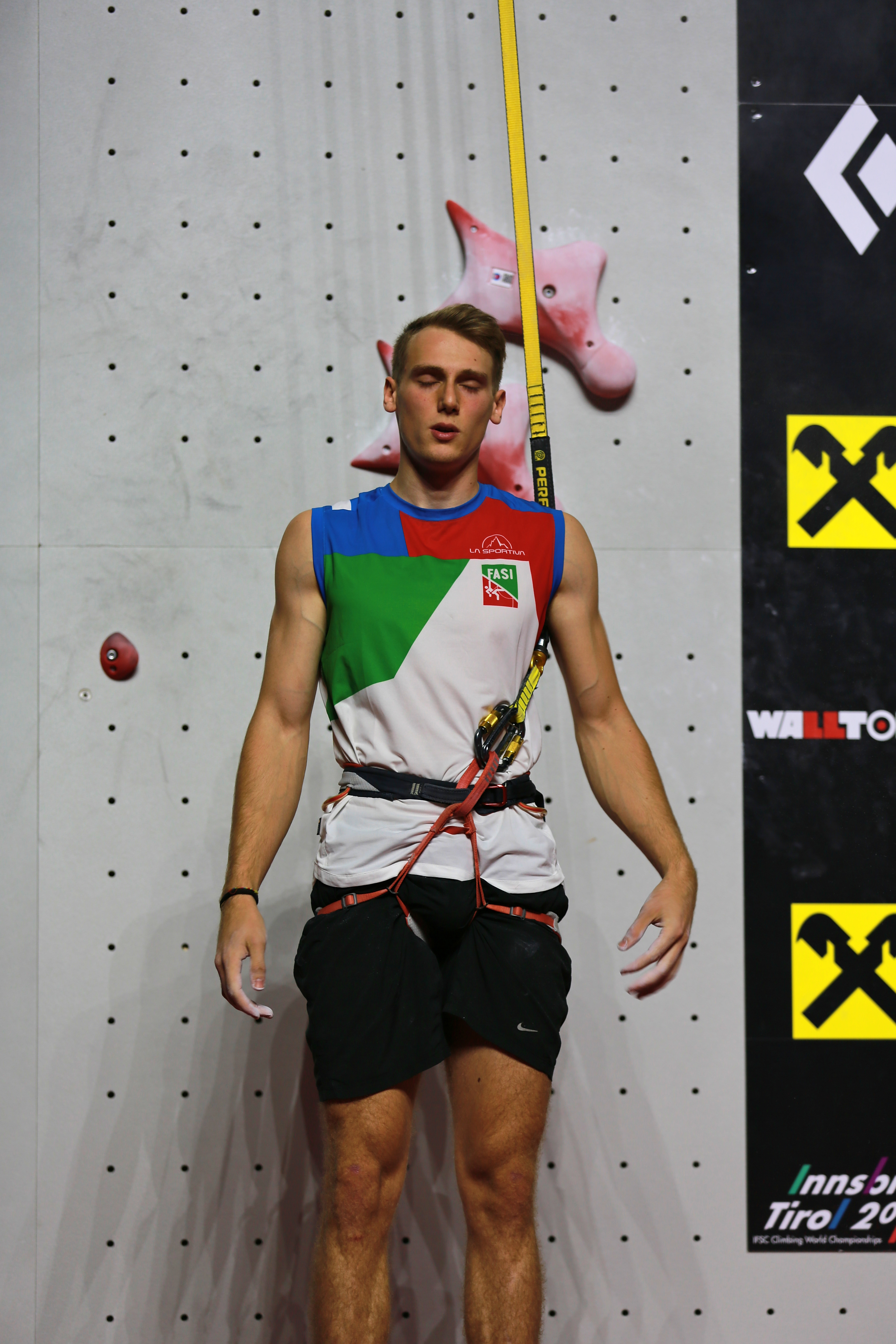

Personal information
- Nationality: Italian
- Born: 21 May 1997 (age 29)

Sport
- Country: Italy
- Sport: Competition speed climbing
- Event: Speed
Medal record
Men's competition climbing
Representing Italy
World Championships
Gold medal – first place	2019 Hachiōji	Speed
European Championships
Gold medal – first place	2024 Villars	Speed

Ludovico Fossali (born 21 May 1997) is an Italian competition speed climber. He competed at the 2020 Summer Olympics, in Men's combined climbing.

== Career ==
Fossali won several medals at the Italian Climbing Championships, including the speed climbing gold medal at the 2017 championships in Arco.

He won the overall bronze speed climbing medal in the 2017 IFSC Climbing World Cup.

He won the speed climbing gold medal at the 2019 IFSC Climbing World Championships in Hachioji, Japan. He placed 9th in the Combined event, securing a qualification for the Tokyo 2020 Olympics.
