= Bassa Mawem =

French professional rock climber (born 1984)

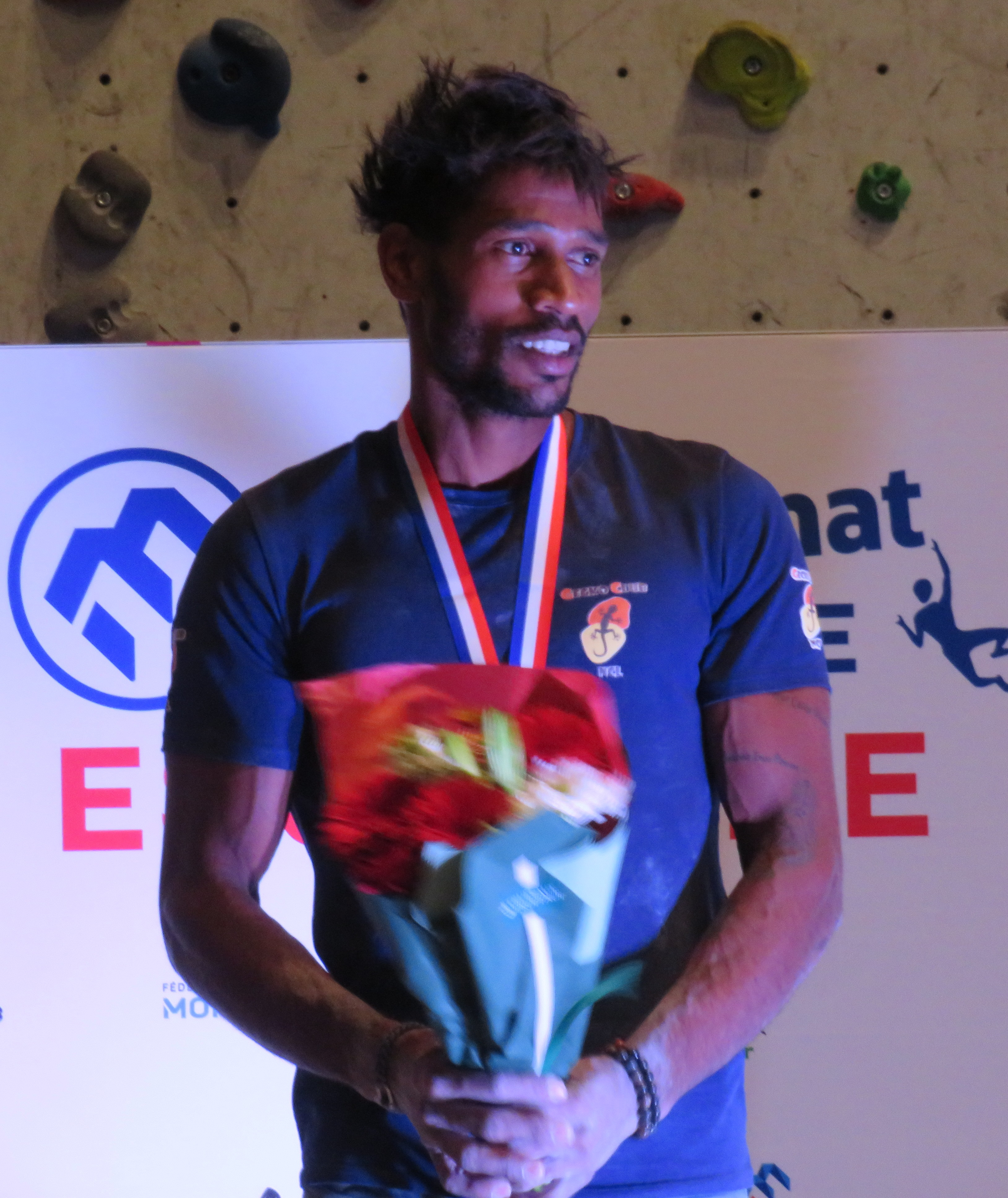
- Bassa Mawem in 2022.

Personal information
- Nickname: Jean
- Nationality: French
- Born: 9 November 1984 (age 41) Nouméa, New Caledonia
- Home town: Houssen, France
- Occupation: Professional climber
- Years active: 1997–present
- Height: 184 cm (6 ft 0 in)

Climbing career
- Type of climber: Competition climbing, Speed climbing

Sport
- Coached by: Sylvain Chapelle
Medal record
Men's competition climbing
Representing France
World Championships
| Silver medal – second place | 2018 Innsbruck | Speed |

Bassa Mawem (born 9 November 1984) is a retired French professional speed climber who specialised in competition climbing. He qualified for the 2020 Summer Olympics. He also qualified for the 2024 Olympics.

== Career ==
He won the overall title in the speed climbing event at the 2018 and 2019 IFSC Climbing World Cup.

On 3 August 2021, Mawem established the first Olympic Record of 5.45s during the Speed Qualifications but was unable to compete in the final due to a bicep injury.

At the 2024 Summer Olympics in Paris, Mawem won by 0.01 seconds in his race against Ukraine's Yaroslav Tkach in the elimination round of qualifications. Mawem ended up in seventh place after losing in the quarterfinals to Indonesia's Veddriq Leonardo, the eventual gold medalist. Bassa retired from the sport after the Paris Olympic Games in 2024.

== Personal life ==
His younger brother Mickaël is also a professional climber.

== Major results ==
=== Olympic Games ===
| Discipline | 2020 | 2024 |
|---|---|---|
| Speed | —N/a | 7 |
| Combined | 8 | — |

=== World championships ===
| Discipline | 2012 | 2014 | 2016 | 2018 | 2019 | 2021 | 2023 |
|---|---|---|---|---|---|---|---|
| Speed | 17 | 7 | 4 | 2 | 13 | — | 13 |
| Bouldering | — | — | — | 116 | 67 | — | — |
| Lead | — | — | — | 105 | 60 | — | — |
| Combined | — | — | — | 14 | 28 | — | — |

=== World Cup ===
| Discipline | 2011 | 2012 | 2013 | 2014 | 2015 | 2016 | 2017 | 2018 | 2019 | 2021 | 2022 | 2023 | 2024 |
|---|---|---|---|---|---|---|---|---|---|---|---|---|---|
| Speed | 63 | 16 | 36 | 5 | 5 | 4 | 19 | 1 | 1 | — | — | 19 | 41 |
| Combined | — | — | — | — | — | — | 51 | — | 19 | — | — | — | |

=== European championships ===
| Discipline | 2013 | 2015 | 2017 | 2019 | 2020 | 2022 |
|---|---|---|---|---|---|---|
| Speed | 14 | 13 | — | — | — | 5 |
