= Iuliia Kaplina =

Russian speed climber (born 1993)

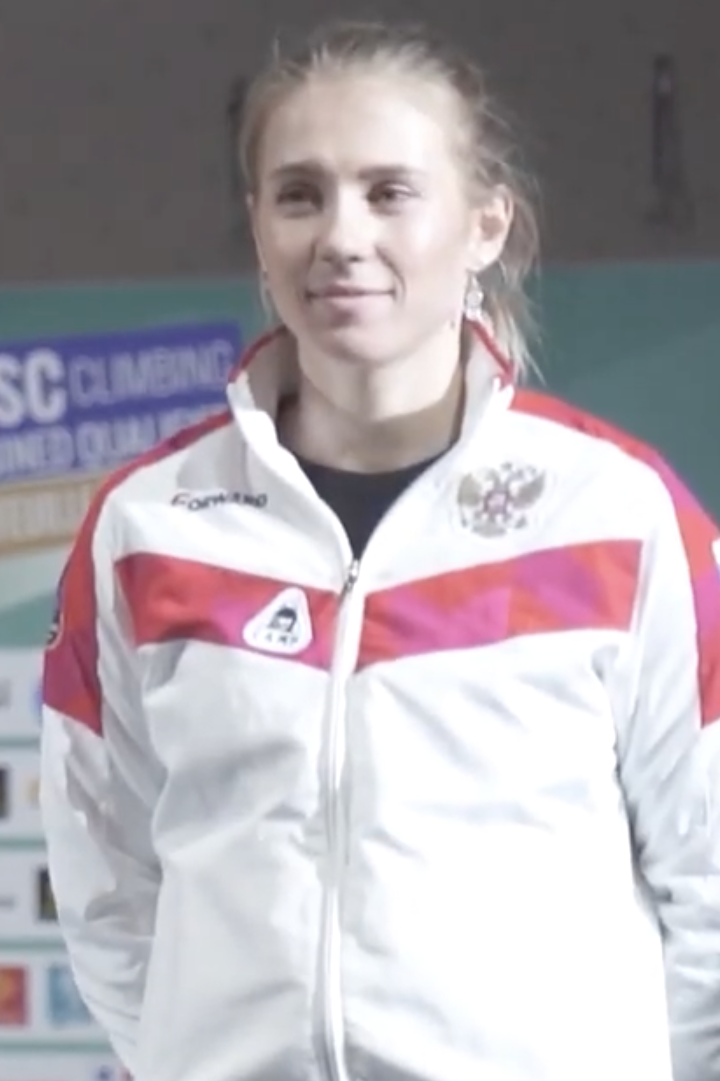

Personal information
- Nationality: Russian
- Born: 11 May 1993 (age 33) Tyumen, Russia
- Height: 165 cm (5 ft 5 in)

Climbing career
- Type of climber: Competition speed climbing
- Known for: setting multiple world records
Medal record
Women's competition climbing
Representing Russia
World Championships
Silver medal – second place	2012 Paris	Speed
Bronze medal – third place	2016 Paris	Speed
World Games
Gold medal – first place	2017	Speed
Representing CFR
World Championships
Silver medal – second place	2021 Moscow	Speed

Iuliia Vladimirovna Kaplina (Russian: Юлия Владимировна Каплина; born 11 May 1993) is a Russian competition climber who has won multiple competition speed climbing events and set multiple world records. She was the world record holder in women's speed climbing until 6 August 2021, setting the record at the 2020 European Championships in Moscow (6.964).

Her first participation in World Cup was in 2012 in Chamonix where she ranked 18th. Her performance at the IFSC Combined Qualifier Toulouse 2019 qualified her for a spot in the 2020 Summer Olympics. There, she did not qualify for the final after failing to push the button at the top of the wall in her second try, leaving her with her initial time of 7.65 at the end, which was not enough to stay in the top 10 until the end of the qualification, as she did not show good enough results in the lead and bouldering events. In an interview with Sport-Express she stated that the Russians did not know about the opportunity to do test climbs before the actual qualification climbs; the organizers forbade test climbs for speed climbers during the qualification event. She explained that test climbs are important to understand the friction of the holds and the climate of the surroundings.

== Rankings ==
=== Climbing World Cup ===
Discipline	2012	2013	2014	2015	2016	2017	2018	2019
Speed	18	2	2	3	1	2	3	4

=== Climbing World Championships ===
Youth

Discipline	2012 Junior
Speed	3

Adult

Discipline	2012	2014	2016	2018	2021
Speed	2	8	3	13	2

== Number of medals in the Climbing World Cup ==
=== Speed ===
Season	Gold	Silver	Bronze	Total
2012				
2013	3		1	4
2014	2	2	1	5
2015	1	1	2	4
2016	2	4		6
2017	3	2	1	6
2018	1	2	1	4
2019	–	–	2	2
2021		1		1
Total	12	12	8	32
