= Danyil Boldyrev =

Ukrainian speed climber (born 1992)

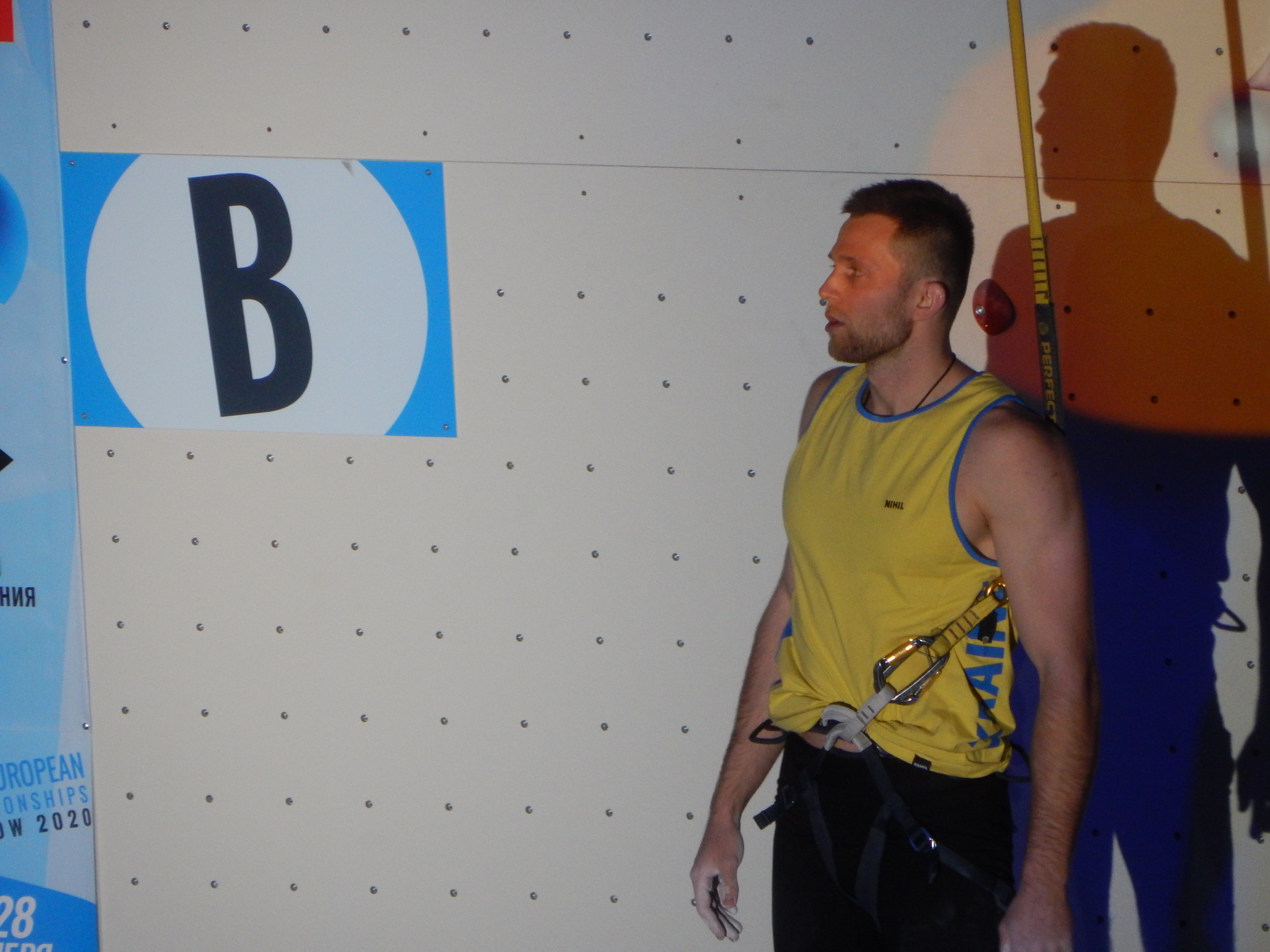
- Boldyrev at the 2020 European Climbing Championships

Personal information
- Native name: Данило Владиславович Болдирєв
- Nationality: Ukrainian
- Born: 15 May 1992 (age 34) Donetsk, Ukraine
- Height: 1.90 m (6 ft 3 in)
- Weight: 78 kg (172 lb)

Sport
- Country: Ukraine
- Sport: Competition climbing
- Event: Speed
- Coached by: Iryna Zubko; Anatoliy Stoliarenko
Medal record
Men's competition climbing
Representing Ukraine
Event	1st	2nd	3rd
World Championship	2	-	1
World Games	-	1	–
European Championships	2	3	1
World Games
Silver medal – second place	2017 Wroclaw	Speed
World Championships
Gold medal – first place	2014 Gijon	Speed
Gold medal – first place	2021 Moscow	Speed
Bronze medal – third place	2011 Arco	Speed
European Championships
Gold medal – first place	2020 Moscow	Speed
Gold medal – first place	2022 Munich	Speed
Silver medal – second place	2015 Chamonix	Speed
Silver medal – second place	2017 Campitello di Fassa	Speed
Silver medal – second place	2019 Edinburgh	Speed
Bronze medal – third place	2013 Chamonix	Speed
World Youth Championships
Gold medal – first place	2011 Imst	Speed Juniors

Danyil Vladyslavovych Boldyrev (Ukrainian: Данило Владиславович Болдирєв; born 15 May 1992) is a Ukrainian competition speed climber. He is the IFSC World champion, multiple World and European Championships medalist and 2017 World Games silver medalist. He was also World Speed Climbing Record holder.

== See also ==
- List of grade milestones in rock climbing
- History of rock climbing
- Rankings of most career IFSC gold medals
