= Marcin Dzieński =

Polish speed climber (born 1993)

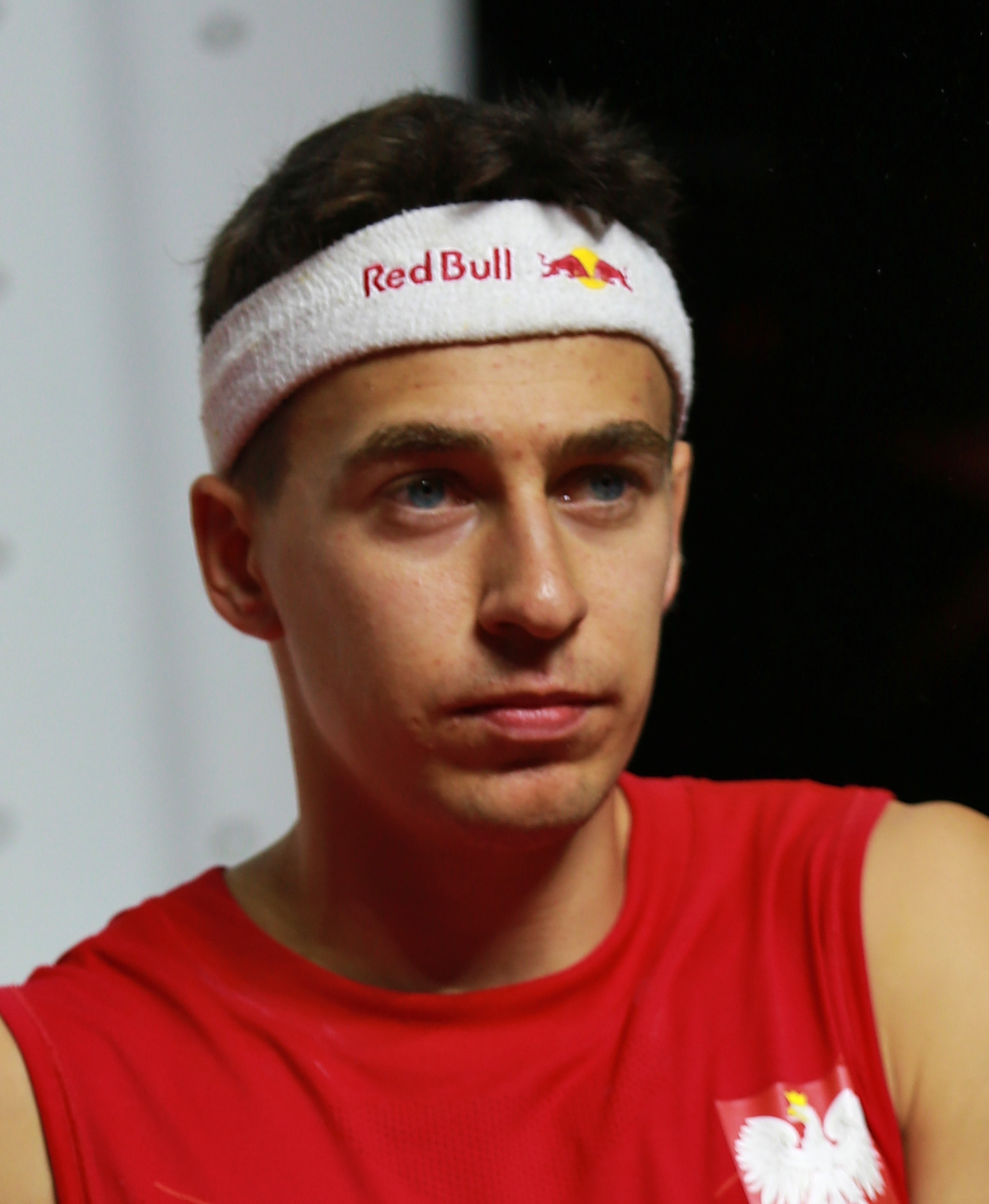
- Marcin Dzieński in 2018

Personal information
- Full name: Marcin Jan Dzieński
- Nickname: Rambo
- Nationality: Polish
- Born: 22 January 1993 (age 33) Tarnów

Sport
- Country: Poland
- Sport: Competition speed climbing
- Club: AZS PWSZ Tarnów
- Coached by: Tomasz Mazur
Medal record
Men's competition climbing
Representing Poland
World Championships
Gold medal – first place	2016 Paris	Speed
Worldcup
Gold medal – first place	2016 Arco	Speed
Gold medal – first place	2016 Villars	Speed
Gold medal – first place	2016 Chamonix	Speed
Gold medal – first place	2014 Mokpo	Speed
European Games
Bronze medal – third place	2023 Kraków–Małopolska	Speed

Marcin Dzieński (born 22 January 1993) is a Polish competition climber who specializes in competition speed climbing from Tarnów. He is multiple World and European Championships medalist and 2016 World Champion, the first Polish climber to achieve that title.

He debuted in Speed Climbing World Championships in 2011. Since 2018, he's also competing in Bouldering World Championships and Worldcup.

== See also ==
- List of grade milestones in rock climbing
- History of rock climbing
- Rankings of most career IFSC gold medals
