= Sport climbing at the 2018 Asian Games =

- Venue: Jakabaring Sport City
- Dates: 23–27 August 2018
- Competitors: 121 from 16 nations

Competition climbing at the 2018 Asian Games was held at the JSC Sport Climbing Arena, Palembang, Indonesia, from 23 to 27 August 2018.

== Schedule ==
Q	Qualification	F	Final

Event↓/Date →	23rd Thu		24th Fri	25th Sat	26th Sun	27th Mon	
Men's speed	Q	F					
Men's speed relay						Q	F
Men's combined	Q		Q	Q	F		
Women's speed	Q	F					
Women's speed relay						Q	F
Women's combined	Q		Q	Q	F		

== Medalists ==
=== Men ===
Event	Gold	Silver	Bronze
Speed	Reza Alipour; Iran	Zhong Qixin; China	Aspar Jaelolo; Indonesia
Speed relay	Indonesia; Muhammad Hinayah; Veddriq Leonardo; Rindi Sufriyanto; Abudzar Yulianto	Indonesia; Muhammad Fajri Alfian; Aspar Jaelolo; Sabri; Septo Wibowo Siburian	China; Li Jinxin; Liang Rongqi; Ou Zhiyong
Combined	Chon Jong-won; South Korea	Kokoro Fujii; Japan	Tomoa Narasaki; Japan

=== Women ===
Event	Gold	Silver	Bronze
Speed	Aries Susanti Rahayu; Indonesia	Puji Lestari; Indonesia	He Cuilian; China
Speed relay	Indonesia; Fitriyani; Puji Lestari; Aries Susanti Rahayu; Rajiah Sallsabillah	China; Deng Lijuan; Niu Di; Pan Xuhua	China; He Cuilian; Ni Mingwei; Qiu Haimei; Song Yiling
Combined	Akiyo Noguchi; Japan	Sa Sol; South Korea	Kim Ja-in; South Korea

== Medal table ==
Rank	Nation	Gold	Silver	Bronze	Total
1	Indonesia (INA)	3	2	1	6
2	Japan (JPN)	1	1	1	3
2	South Korea (KOR)	1	1	1	3
4	Iran (IRI)	1	0	0	1
5	China (CHN)	0	2	3	5
Totals (5 entries)		6	6	6	18

== Participating nations ==
A total of 121 athletes from 16 nations competed in sport climbing at the 2018 Asian Games:

- China (18)
- Chinese Taipei (1)
- Hong Kong (4)
- India (3)
- Indonesia (20)
- Iran (8)
- Japan (4)
- Kazakhstan (13)
- Malaysia (7)
- Mongolia (3)
- Nepal (2)
- Pakistan (2)
- Philippines (1)
- Singapore (7)
- South Korea (14)
- Thailand (14)
