= Speed climbing at the 2019 IFSC Climbing World Cup =

Annual competition series

- Location: Moscow, Russia; Chongqing, China; Wujiang, China; Villars, Switzerland; Chamonix, France; Xiamen, China
- Dates: 12 April – 20 October 2019

Champions
- Men: (France) Bassa Mawem
- Women: (China) YiLing Song

Competition speed climbing in the 2019 IFSC Climbing World Cup was held over six stages at six different locations, from 12 April to 20 October 2019. The top three in each competition received medals, and at the end of the season, the overall winners were awarded trophies. The overall winners were determined based upon points, which athletes were awarded for finishing in the top 30 of each individual event. Bassa Mawem won the men's seasonal title, YiLing Song won the women's seasonal title, and Russian Federation defended its national team title.

== Winners overview ==
Date	Location	Men	Women
April, 12–14	Moscow, Russia	(France) Bassa Mawem	(China) YiLing Song
April, 26–28	Chongqing, China	(Indonesia) Alfian Muhammad	(China) YiLing Song
May, 3–5	Wujiang, China	(Russia) Dmitrii Timofeev	(Poland) Aleksandra Miroslaw
July, 4–6	Villars, Switzerland	(Russia) Aleksandr Shikov	(France) Anouck Jaubert
July, 11–13	Chamonix, France	(Indonesia) Alfian Muhammad	(China) YiLing Song
October, 18–20	Xiamen, China	(China) QiXin Zhong	(Indonesia) Aries Susanti Rahayu
OVERALL WINNERS		(France) Bassa Mawem	(China) YiLing Song
NATIONAL TEAM		(Russia) Russian Federation	

== Records broken ==
Event	Round	Climber	Location	Time	Date
Women's speed	Final	(China) YiLing Song	Chongqing, China	7.101	April 26, 2019
Women's speed	Final	(Indonesia) Aries Susanti Rahayu	Xiamen, China	6.995	October 19, 2019

== Overall ranking ==
The overall ranking is determined based upon points, which athletes are awarded for finishing in the top 30 of each individual event. There are six competitions in the season, but only the best five attempts are counted. The national ranking is the sum of the points of that country's three best male and female athletes. Results displayed in parentheses are not counted.

=== Men ===
The results of the ten most successful athletes of the Speed World Cup 2019:

Rank	NAME	Points	Xiamen	Chamonix	Villars	Wujiang	Chongqing	Moscow
1	(France) Bassa Mawem	329.00	5. 51.00	7. 43.00	4. 55.00	2. 80.00	15. (22.00)	1. 100.00
2	(Russia) Vladislav Deulin	312.00	3. 65.00	3. 65.00	5. 51.00	5. 51.00	14. (24.00)	2. 80.00
3	(Indonesia) Alfian Muhammad	286.00	8. 40.00	1. 100.00	20. 12.00	10. 34.00	1. 100.00	24. (7.00)
4	(China) QiXin Zhong	285.00	1. 100.00	2. 80.00	7. 43.00	24. 7.00	4. 55.00	( — )
5	(Russia) Dmitrii Timofeev	283.00	7. 43.00	16. 20.00	2. 80.00	1. 100.00	16. (20.00)	8. 40.00
6	(Iran) Reza Alipourshenazandifar	236.00	6. 47.00	23. (8.00)	8. 40.00	4. 55.00	5. 51.00	7. 43.00
7	(Russia) Sergey Rukin	234.00	4. 55.00	6. 47.00	16. 20.00	( — )	3. 65.00	6. 47.00
8	(Russia) Aleksandr Shikov	203.00	12. 28.00	14. 24.00	1. 100.00	( — )	( — )	5. 51.00
9	(Ukraine) Kostiantyn Pavlenko	181.00	22. 9.00	11. 31.00	19. 14.00	6. 47.00	2. 80.00	( — )
10	(Czech Republic) Jan Kriz	162.00	24. (7.00)	18. 16.00	3. 65.00	7. 43.00	18. 16.00	15. 22.00

=== Women ===
The results of the ten most successful athletes of the Speed World Cup 2019:

Rank	NAME	Points	Xiamen	Chamonix	Villars	Wujiang	Chongqing	Moscow
1	(China) YiLing Song	460.00	2. 80.00	1. 100.00	2. 80.00	16. (20.00)	1. 100.00	1. 100.00
2	(France) Anouck Jaubert	355.00	4. 55.00	16. (20.00)	1. 100.00	3. 65.00	4. 55.00	2. 80.00
3	(Indonesia) Aries Susanti Rahayu	333.00	1. 100.00	4. 55.00	19. (14.00)	2. 80.00	5. 51.00	6. 47.00
4	(Russia) Elizaveta Ivanova	261.00	29. (2.00)	2. 80.00	3. 65.00	12. 28.00	9. 37.00	5. 51.00
5	(China) Di Niu	201.00	7. 43.00	15. 22.00	4. 55.00	6. 47.00	10. 34.00	( — )
6	(Russia) Anna Tsyganova	197.00	( — )	( — )	6. 47.00	4. 55.00	8. 40.00	4. 55.00
7	(Poland) Aleksandra Kalucka	194.00	20. (12.00)	3. 65.00	15. 22.00	8. 40.00	14. 24.00	7. 43.00
8	(Poland) Patrycja Chudziak	188.00	( — )	7. 43.00	7. 43.00	5. 51.00	16. 20.00	11. 31.00
9	(Poland) Aleksandra Miroslaw	180.00	( — )	( — )	( — )	1. 100.00	2. 80.00	( — )
10	(Russia) Iuliia Kaplina	172.00	18. 16.00	( — )	( — )	13. 26.00	3. 65.00	3. 65.00

=== National Teams ===
The results of the ten most successful countries of the Lead World Cup 2019:

Country names as used by the IFSC

Rank	Nation	Points	Xiamen	Chamonix	Villars	Wujiang	Chongqing	Moscow
1	(Russia) Russian Federation	1637	318	294	383	293	(292)	349
2	People's Republic of China	1375	343	268	263	209	292	(180)
3	France	1004	204	(113)	219	215	129	237
4	Indonesia	979	172	232	(46)	187	250	138
5	Poland	874	(59)	210	149	217	184	114
6	Ukraine	328	35	86	61	57	89	( — )
7	Islamic Republic of Iran	257	51	(8)	40	55	51	60
8	Italy	250	(0)	15	50	83	12	90
9	Ecuador	195	26	65	35	36	(22)	33
10	Czech Republic	162	(7)	16	65	43	16	22

== Moscow, Russia (April, 12–14) ==
=== Men ===
91 men attended the event.

France's Bassa Mawem took the win. Russia's Vladislav Deulin placed second while Indonesia's Aspar Jaelolo placed third. World record holder, Iran's Reza Alipourshenazandifar placed 7th.

Rank	Name	Final	Small	1/2	1/4	1/8	Qual.
1st place, gold medalist(s)	(France) Bassa Mawem	5.730		5.656	5.761	5.792	5.699
2nd place, silver medalist(s)	(Russia) Vladislav Deulin	11.545		5.919	5.864	6.021	5.874
3rd place, bronze medalist(s)	(Indonesia) Aspar Jaelolo		6.083	Sturz	6.617	6.780	5.838
4	(China) Long Cao		10.004	6.663	9.391	5.797	5.731
5	(Russia) Aleksandr Shikov				7.126	5.891	6.096
6	(Russia) Sergey Rukin				7.263	5.908	5.809
7	(Iran) Reza Alipourshenazandifar				7.587	5.922	5.826
8	(Russia) Dmitrii Timofeev				Sturz	5.927	5.913
9	(Russia) Aleksandr Shilov					6.068	6.207
10	(Russia) Stanislav Kokorin					6.094	6.163
11	(Kazakhstan) Amir Maimuratov					6.096	6.083
12	(Italy) Gian Luca Zodda					6.310	6.230
13	(Russia) Georgy Artamonov					6.804	6.162
14	(Italy) Ludovico Fossali					6.960	6.157
15	(Czech Republic) Jan Kriz					7.665	6.222
16	(Russia) Lev Rudatskiy					7.681	6.138

=== Women ===
76 women attended the event.

China's YiLing Song won her first gold medal in the World Cup circuit after a tight race in the final against France's Anouck Jaubert who took second place. Russia's Iuliia Kaplina took third place.

Rank	Name	Final	Small	1/2	1/4	1/8	Qual.
1st place, gold medalist(s)	(China) YiLing Song	7.389		7.435	7.723	7.668	7.880
2nd place, silver medalist(s)	(France) Anouck Jaubert	7.682		8.363	7.800	8.372	8.024
3rd place, bronze medalist(s)	(Russia) Iuliia Kaplina		8.233	7.444	7.562	7.721	7.464
4	(Russia) Anna Tsyganova		Sturz	Sturz	7.833	8.036	7.999
5	(Russia) Elizaveta Ivanova				7.796	7.990	8.130
6	(Indonesia) Aries Susanti Rahayu				7.915	7.792	7.711
7	(Poland) Aleksandra Kalucka				9.684	8.639	8.438
8	(Russia) Elena Remizova				10.717	8.159	7.860
9	(France) Aurelia Sarisson					8.341	8.462
10	(Italy) Anna Calanca					8.477	8.544
11	(Poland) Patrycja Chudziak					8.480	8.395
12	(Ecuador) Andrea Rojas					8.614	8.590
13	(Russia) Ekaterina Barashchuk					8.815	8.577
14	(China) MingWei Ni					10.019	7.967
15	(Poland) Anna Brozek					10.419	8.259
16	(Russia) Mariia Krasavina					Sturz	8.102

== Chongqing, China (April, 26–28) ==
=== Men ===
85 men attended the event.

Indonesia's Alfian Muhammad took the win. Ukraine's Kostiantyn Pavlenko placed second and Russia's Sergey Rukin third. France's Bassa Mawem, Moscow's winner, was eliminated early in the competition, placing 15th.

Rank	Name	Final	Small	1/2	1/4	1/8	Qual.
1st place, gold medalist(s)	(Indonesia) Alfian Muhammad	5.970		6.100	5.961	5.963	5.914
2nd place, silver medalist(s)	(Ukraine) Kostiantyn Pavlenko	6.315		5.799	5.997	6.130	6.206
3rd place, bronze medalist(s)	(Russia) Sergey Rukin		6.808	9.842	6.637	5.813	6.020
4	(China) QiXin Zhong		Sturz	5.820	5.616	5.912	5.618
5	(Iran) Reza Alipourshenazandifar				5.733	5.996	6.115
6	(Russia) Nikolai Iarilovets				6.310	6.345	6.263
7	(China) ZhiYong Ou				7.034	8.427	6.279
8	(Indonesia) Fatchur Roji				7.518	6.327	6.212
9	(Poland) Marcin Dzienski					6.080	6.317
10	(China) JinBao Long					6.164	6.128
11	(Indonesia) Aspar Jaelolo					6.286	5.876
12	(Russia) Aleksandr Shilov					7.379	6.085
13	(China) ZhiXing Chen					8.115	5.842
14	(Russia) Vladislav Deulin					8.936	6.133
15	(France) Bassa Mawem					Sturz	5.677
16	(Russia) Dmitrii Timofeev					Sturz	5.827

=== Women ===
74 women attended the event.

China's YiLing Song won her second gold medal. Song also set a new world record (7.101 seconds) in the quarter-final race against Poland’s Natalia Kalucka. Poland's Aleksandra Miroslaw took silver and Russia's Iuliia Kaplina took bronze.

Rank	Name	Final	Small	1/2	1/4	1/8	Qual.
1st place, gold medalist(s)	(China) YiLing Song	7.673		7.110	7.101	7.687	7.471
2nd place, silver medalist(s)	(Poland) Aleksandra Miroslaw	Sturz		7.368	7.564	7.765	7.484
3rd place, bronze medalist(s)	(Russia) Iuliia Kaplina		8.429	Sturz	8.180	7.491	7.618
4	(France) Anouck Jaubert		Sturz	7.321	7.400	7.818	7.738
5	(Indonesia) Aries Susanti Rahayu				7.429	7.652	7.739
6	(Russia) Elena Timofeeva				7.934	7.939	8.042
7	(Poland) Natalia Kalucka				7.975	8.245	8.205
8	(Russia) Anna Tsyganova				Sturz	7.957	7.990
9	(Russia) Elizaveta Ivanova					7.672	8.218
10	(China) Di Niu					8.065	8.212
11	(France) Aurelia Sarisson					8.127	8.358
12	(Indonesia) Iqamah Nurul					8.274	8.334
13	(China) PeiYang Tian					8.281	8.174
14	(Poland) Aleksandra Kalucka					8.856	8.312
15	(China) MingWei Ni					8.913	8.213
16	(Poland) Patrycja Chudziak					10.740	8.310

== Wujiang, China (May, 3–5) ==
=== Men ===
85 men attended the event.

Russia's Dmitrii Timofeev beat France's Bassa Mawem in the final race and claimed the gold medal. Mawem took second place while Italy's Ludovico Fossali took third place.

Rank	Name	Final	Small	1/2	1/4	1/8	Qual.
1st place, gold medalist(s)	(Russia) Dmitrii Timofeev	5.597		5.580	5.695	5.856	5.683
2nd place, silver medalist(s)	(France) Bassa Mawem	5.810		5.962	5.855	5.889	5.769
3rd place, bronze medalist(s)	(Italy) Ludovico Fossali		5.856	6.566	5.783	6.066	6.182
4	(Iran) Reza Alipourshenazandifar		6.436	5.627	5.739	5.904	5.657
5	(Russia) Vladislav Deulin				5.843	6.015	5.932
6	(Ukraine) Kostiantyn Pavlenko				5.848	5.984	5.964
7	(Czech Republic) Jan Kriz				5.926	6.034	6.059
8	(China) ZhiXing Chen				8.279	6.438	5.820
9	(Indonesia) Fatchur Roji					6.002	6.112
10	(Indonesia) Alfian Muhammad					6.064	5.812
11	(China) PengHui Lin					6.114	6.028
12	(Russia) Arsenii Bogomolov					6.129	6.053
13	(Poland) Marcin Dzienski					6.202	6.179
14	(Russia) Aleksandr Shilov					6.440	6.138
15	(Indonesia) Aspar Jaelolo					7.097	5.598
16	(China) ZhiYong Ou					8.354	6.054

=== Women ===
68 women attended the event.

Poland's Aleksandra Miroslaw won the gold medal after a tight final race against Indonesia's Aries Susanti Rahayu. Rahayu placed second while France's Anouck Jaubert placed third. China's YiLing Song, who had just set a new world record last week in Chongqing, slipped in an early race against Poland’s Aleksandra Kalucka and finished the competition in 16th place.

Rank	Name	Final	Small	1/2	1/4	1/8	Qual.
1st place, gold medalist(s)	(Poland) Aleksandra Miroslaw	7.313		7.280	7.624	7.541	7.285
2nd place, silver medalist(s)	(Indonesia) Aries Susanti Rahayu	7.607		7.717	7.828	8.197	7.793
3rd place, bronze medalist(s)	(France) Anouck Jaubert		7.516	7.668	7.778	7.927	7.732
4	(Russia) Anna Tsyganova		7.541	7.720	8.592	7.838	8.089
5	(Poland) Patrycja Chudziak				7.957	8.028	8.071
6	(China) Di Niu				8.811	8.148	8.287
7	(France) Aurelia Sarisson				10.566	8.275	8.233
8	(Poland) Aleksandra Kalucka				Sturz	9.173	8.291
9	(China) MingWei Ni					8.080	7.971
10	(China) PeiYang Tian					8.226	8.219
11	(Russia) Elena Timofeeva					8.673	7.960
12	(Russia) Elizaveta Ivanova					8.985	7.774
13	(Russia) Iuliia Kaplina					8.991	7.684
14	(Poland) Anna Brozek					9.038	8.368
15	(Ecuador) Andrea Rojas					9.807	8.260
16	(China) YiLing Song					13.652	7.566

== Villars, Switzerland (July, 4–6) ==
=== Men ===
84 men attended the event.

Russia's Aleksandr Shikov and Dmitrii Timofeev placed first and second respectively. The Czech Republic’s Jan Kriz beat France's Bassa Mawem in the small final and earned a bronze medal.

Rank	Name	Final	Small	1/2	1/4	1/8	Qual.
1st place, gold medalist(s)	(Russia) Aleksandr Shikov	5.542		5.892	6.880	6.355	5.630
2nd place, silver medalist(s)	(Russia) Dmitrii Timofeev	Sturz		5.513	5.735	6.354	5.716
3rd place, bronze medalist(s)	(Czech Republic) Jan Kriz		7.765	6.078	5.997	6.182	6.040
4	(France) Bassa Mawem		Sturz	5.573	5.655	5.765	5.686
5	(Russia) Vladislav Deulin				5.754	5.899	5.956
6	(Ukraine) Danyil Boldyrev				6.011	6.032	5.964
7	(China) QiXin Zhong				Sturz	20.000	5.873
8	(Iran) Reza Alipourshenazandifar				Fehlstart	6.075	5.923
9	(Italy) Ludovico Fossali					5.863	6.142
10	(Russia) Lev Rudatskiy					6.300	5.803
11	(China) JinBao Long					6.556	5.755
12	(China) Long Cao					6.970	5.799
13	(Russia) Aleksandr Shilov					7.367	6.099
14	(Kazakhstan) Rishat Khaibullin					7.499	6.149
15	(South Korea) Seungbeom Lee					Sturz	5.871
16	(Russia) Sergey Rukin					Fehlstart	5.909

=== Women ===
73 women attended the event.

France's Anouck Jaubert took the gold medal after winning a final race against China's YiLing Song. Song earned a silver medal while Russia's Elizaveta Ivanova earned bronze after beating China's Di Niu in the small final.

Rank	Name	Final	Small	1/2	1/4	1/8	Qual.
1st place, gold medalist(s)	(France) Anouck Jaubert	7.660		20.000	7.590	7.738	7.638
2nd place, silver medalist(s)	(China) YiLing Song	8.415		7.428	7.239	7.483	7.224
3rd place, bronze medalist(s)	(Russia) Elizaveta Ivanova		7.586	Fehlstart	7.359	8.746	7.602
4	(China) Di Niu		10.657	7.914	8.475	8.171	8.345
5	(Poland) Natalia Kalucka				7.898	7.996	8.115
6	(Russia) Anna Tsyganova				8.064	9.248	8.311
7	(Poland) Patrycja Chudziak				8.236	8.277	8.208
8	(Russia) Kseniia Petrova				9.368	8.799	8.478
9	(Poland) Anna Brozek					8.285	8.257
10	(Japan) Miho Nonaka					8.432	8.571
11	(France) Capucine Viglione					8.478	8.642
12	(Ecuador) Andrea Rojas					8.964	8.626
13	(China) MingWei Ni					9.056	7.833
14	(Russia) Mariia Krasavina					9.288	8.011
15	(Poland) Aleksandra Kalucka					9.476	7.959
16	(Indonesia) Iqamah Nurul					10.137	8.239

== Chamonix, France (July, 11–13) ==
=== Men ===
97 men attended the event.

Indonesia's Alfian Muhammad took the win. China's QiXin Zhong placed second while Russia's Vladislav Deulin placed third.

Rank	Name	Final	Small	1/2	1/4	1/8	Qual.
1st place, gold medalist(s)	(Indonesia) Alfian Muhammad	5.764		5.690	6.037	5.854	6.174
2nd place, silver medalist(s)	(China) QiXin Zhong	6.382		5.698	5.840	5.986	5.708
3rd place, bronze medalist(s)	(Russia) Vladislav Deulin		6.057	5.799	99.000	6.402	6.055
4	(Ukraine) Danyil Boldyrev		Sturz	5.848	99.000	5.857	5.862
5	(Poland) Marcin Dzienski				6.362	6.087	6.035
6	(Russia) Sergey Rukin				7.448	5.835	5.980
7	(France) Bassa Mawem				Fehlstart	5.947	5.793
8	(United States) John Brosler				Fehlstart	6.096	6.097
9	(Indonesia) Aspar Jaelolo					5.878	5.998
10	(South Korea) Seungbeom Lee					5.943	6.064
11	(Ukraine) Kostiantyn Pavlenko					5.993	6.156
12	(Russia) Stanislav Kokorin					6.180	6.185
13	(China) Long Cao					7.407	5.829
14	(Russia) Aleksandr Shikov					7.494	5.918
15	(Russia) Aleksandr Shilov					7.899	5.975
16	(Russia) Dmitrii Timofeev					Sturz	5.780

=== Women ===
83 women attended the event.

China's YiLing Song earned a gold medal. Russia's Elizaveta Ivanova placed second while Poland's Aleksandra Kalucka placed third.

Rank	Name	Final	Small	1/2	1/4	1/8	Qual.
1st place, gold medalist(s)	(China) YiLing Song	99.000		7.254	7.291	7.562	7.842
2nd place, silver medalist(s)	(Russia) Elizaveta Ivanova	Fehlstart		7.556	7.686	7.784	7.824
3rd place, bronze medalist(s)	(Poland) Aleksandra Kalucka		7.661	7.626	7.687	7.825	8.161
4	(Indonesia) Aries Susanti Rahayu		Sturz	9.808	7.816	7.988	7.885
5	(Poland) Anna Brozek				7.970	8.195	8.493
6	(Ecuador) Andrea Rojas				8.318	9.263	8.538
7	(Poland) Patrycja Chudziak				8.347	8.599	8.204
8	(Russia) Mariia Krasavina				8.548	8.234	8.203
9	(Indonesia) Iqamah Nurul					8.352	8.719
10	(Russia) Elena Remizova					8.366	8.667
11	(China) MingWei Ni					9.037	8.680
12	(Austria) Alexandra Elmer					9.037	9.002
13	(France) Capucine Viglione					9.090	8.937
14	(Russia) Kseniia Petrova					9.282	8.508
15	(China) Di Niu					9.676	8.780
16	(France) Anouck Jaubert					Sturz	8.886

== Xiamen, China (October, 18–20) ==
=== Men ===
65 men attended the event.

China's QiXin Zhong won the gold medal. Russia's Lev Rudatskiy and Vladislav Deulin placed second and third respectively.

Rank	Name	Final	Small	1/2	1/4	1/8	Qual.
1st place, gold medalist(s)	(China) QiXin Zhong	7.208		5.568	5.528	5.754	5.490
2nd place, silver medalist(s)	(Russia) Lev Rudatskiy	Sturz		5.528	6.305	5.733	5.872
3rd place, bronze medalist(s)	(Russia) Vladislav Deulin		5.635	5.560	5.608	5.822	5.832
4	(Russia) Sergey Rukin		5.763	5.899	Wildcard	5.922	5.968
5	(France) Bassa Mawem				5.806	5.855	5.950
6	(Iran) Reza Alipourshenazandifar				6.366	7.383	5.658
7	(Russia) Dmitrii Timofeev				6.457	5.735	5.648
8	(Indonesia) Alfian Muhammad				Fehlstart	5.759	5.668
9	(South Korea) Seungbeom Lee					5.856	5.988
10	(China) JinBao Long					5.904	5.953
11	(China) PengHui Lin					5.914	5.967
12	(Russia) Aleksandr Shikov					5.950	5.762
13	(Kazakhstan) Rishat Khaibullin					6.012	5.887
14	(France) Pierre Rebreyend					6.064	6.057
15	(Indonesia) Fatchur Roji					6.795	6.041
16	(Russia) Aleksandr Shilov					8.823	5.999

=== Women ===
51 women attended the event.

Indonesia's Aries Susanti Rahayu set a new world record (6.995 seconds) in the final race against China's YiLing Song and claimed the gold medal. Rahayu also became the first woman in the history to break the 7-second barrier. Song claimed the silver while Russia's Mariia Krasavina claimed the bronze.

Rank	Name	Final	Small	1/2	1/4	1/8	Qual.
1st place, gold medalist(s)	(Indonesia) Aries Susanti Rahayu	6.995		7.163	7.311	7.387	7.204
2nd place, silver medalist(s)	(China) YiLing Song	9.032		7.169	7.201	8.699	7.423
3rd place, bronze medalist(s)	(Russia) Mariia Krasavina		7.947	Sturz	7.287	7.554	7.707
4	(France) Anouck Jaubert		14.375	7.698	7.442	7.770	7.592
5	(China) LiJuan Deng				7.398	7.631	8.207
6	(China) PeiYang Tian				7.684	8.182	8.097
7	(China) Di Niu				8.132	7.763	7.718
8	(France) Aurelia Sarisson				8.226	8.017	8.152
9	(Russia) Elena Remizova					7.985	8.712
10	(France) Victoire Andrier					8.159	8.486
11	(Poland) Natalia Kalucka					8.302	8.415
12	(China) LiRong Yan					8.457	8.508
13	(Ukraine) Tetiana Kolkotina					8.715	8.635
14	(Ecuador) Andrea Rojas					8.718	8.602
15	(South Korea) Sol Sa					8.956	8.712
16	(China) GuiZhen Xie					9.284	8.528
