= Hengshan =

Hengshan may refer to the following locations in mainland China or Taiwan:

== China ==
=== Mountains ===
- Mount Heng (Hunan) (衡山)
- Mount Heng (Shanxi) (恒山)

=== Counties and districts ===
- Hengshan County (衡山县), named after Mount Heng (Hunan)
- Hengshan District, Jixi (恒山区), Heilongjiang
- Hengshan District, Yulin (横山区), Shaanxi

=== Towns ===
- Hengshan, Anhui (衡山), in Huoshan County
- Songling, Suzhou, formerly Hengshan (横扇), in Wujiang District, Suzhou, Jiangsu
- Hengshan, Chongqing (横山), in Qijiang District
- Hengshan, Zhanjiang (横山), in Lianjiang, Guangdong
- Hengshan, Jiangxi (横山), in Guangfeng County
- Hengshan, Shaanxi (横山), seat of Hengshan County
- Hengshan, Zhejiang (横山), in Longyou County

=== Townships ===
- Hengshan Township, Guangxi (横山乡), in Luchuan County
- Hengshan Township, Sichuan (横山乡), in Huili County

=== Villages ===
- Hengshan, Bofan, in Bofan, Anlu, Xiaogan, Hubei

=== Others ===
- Hengshan Road (衡山路), street in the former French Concession of Shanghai
- Hengshan Commandery (恆山郡), historical commandery in China

== Taiwan ==
- Hengshan, Hsinchu (橫山鄉), township of Hsinchu County, Taiwan
- Hengshan (Puakua Plateau) (橫山), located in Hsinchu County, Taiwan

== See also ==
- Hengshan Station (disambiguation)
