= 2018 IFSC Climbing World Cup =

International sport climbing competition

- Organiser: IFSC
- Edition: 30th
- Events: 22: 7 Boulder 7 Lead 8 Speed
- Locations: 14: Meiringen, Switzerland Moscow, Russia Chongqing, China Tai'an, China Hachioji, Japan Vail, United States Villars, Switzerland Chamonix, France Briançon, France Arco, Italy Munich, Germany Kranj, Slovenia Wujiang, China Xiamen, China
- Dates: 13 April – 28 October 2018

Lead
- Men: (Austria) Jakob Schubert
- Women: (Slovenia) Janja Garnbret
- Team: Austria

Boulder
- Men: (Slovenia) Jernej Kruder
- Women: (Japan) Miho Nonaka
- Team: (Japan)

Speed
- Men: (France) Bassa Mawem
- Women: (France) Anouck Jaubert
- Team: (Russia) Russian Federation

Combined
- Men: (Austria) Jakob Schubert
- Women: (Slovenia) Janja Garnbret

The 2018 IFSC Climbing World Cup was held in 14 locations. There were 22 events: 7 bouldering, 7 lead, and 8 speed events. The season began on 13 April in Meiringen, Switzerland, and concluded on 28 October in Xiamen, China.

The top 3 in each competition received medals, and the overall winners were awarded trophies. At the end of the season an overall ranking was determined based upon points, which athletes were awarded for finishing in the top 30 of each individual event.

The winners for bouldering were Jernej Kruder and Miho Nonaka, for lead Jakob Schubert and Janja Garnbret, for speed Bassa Mawem and Anouck Jaubert, and for combined Jakob Schubert and Janja Garnbret, men and women respectively. The National Team for bouldering was Japan, for lead Austria, and for speed Russian Federation.

== Highlights of the season ==
In bouldering, at the World Cup in Munich, Janja Garnbret of Slovenia flashed all boulders in the final round to take the win. Miho Nonaka and Akiyo Noguchi, both of Japan, were the only athletes who never missed a podium in all 7 bouldering competitions in the season.

In lead climbing, Janja Garnbret was the only athlete who never missed a podium in all 7 lead competitions in the season.

In speed climbing, at the first Speed World Cup of the season in Moscow, Anouck Jaubert of France matched the world record of 7.32 seconds set by Iuliia Kaplina of Russia at the 2017 World Games in Wrocław. Then at the end of the season, French athletes, Bassa Mawem and Anouck Jaubert clinched the overall titles of the season for men and women respectively, making it double speed titles for France.

== Changes from the previous season ==
For the 2018 season the IFSC changed the scoring method for its tournaments. Previously in bouldering, topped boulders were the deciding factor, followed as tiebreakers in decreasing order of importance: attempts to tops, bonus holds (renamed to zones), and attempts to bonus holds. The first and second tiebreakers switched places which means that the results were determined by tops, zones, attempts to tops, and attempts to zones. Also athletes now need to demonstrate firm control of the two starting hand holds. Previously touching all four marked start points in any manner was deemed sufficient to start an attempt.

== Overview ==
No.	Location	D	G	Gold	Silver	Bronze
1	(Switzerland) Meiringen; 13 – 14 April 2018	B	M	(Slovenia) Jernej Kruder	(Japan) Tomoa Narasaki	(Russia) Alexey Rubtsov
1	(Switzerland) Meiringen; 13 – 14 April 2018	B	W	(Japan) Miho Nonaka	(Slovenia) Janja Garnbret	(Japan) Akiyo Noguchi
2	(Russia) Moscow; 21 – 22 April 2018	B	M	(Japan) Tomoa Narasaki	(Slovenia) Jernej Kruder	(Slovenia) Gregor Vezonik
2	(Russia) Moscow; 21 – 22 April 2018	B	W	(Slovenia) Janja Garnbret	(Japan) Miho Nonaka	(Japan) Akiyo Noguchi
2	(Russia) Moscow; 21 – 22 April 2018	S	M	(Iran) Reza Alipour	(Russia) Vladislav Deulin	(Indonesia) Veddriq Leonardo
2	(Russia) Moscow; 21 – 22 April 2018	S	W	(France) Anouck Jaubert	(Russia) Iuliia Kaplina	(Russia) Elena Timofeeva
3	(China) Chongqing; 5 – 6 May 2018	B	M	(Japan) Kokoro Fujii	(Canada) Sean McColl	(Russia) Alexey Rubtsov
3	(China) Chongqing; 5 – 6 May 2018	B	W	(Japan) Akiyo Noguchi	(Japan) Miho Nonaka	(Serbia) Staša Gejo
3	(China) Chongqing; 5 – 6 May 2018	S	M	(Russia) Dmitrii Timofeev	(Indonesia) Aspar Jaelolo	(Ukraine) Danyil Boldyrev
3	(China) Chongqing; 5 – 6 May 2018	S	W	(Indonesia) Aries Susanti Rahayu	(Russia) Elena Timofeeva	(Indonesia) Puji Lestari
4	(China) Tai'an; 12 – 13 May 2018	B	M	(Israel) Alex Khazanov	(Slovenia) Jernej Kruder	(Slovenia) Gregor Vezonik
4	(China) Tai'an; 12 – 13 May 2018	B	W	(Japan) Akiyo Noguchi	(Japan) Miho Nonaka	(France) Fanny Gibert
4	(China) Tai'an; 12 – 13 May 2018	S	M	(France) Bassa Mawem	(Indonesia) Sabri Sabri	(Russia) Dmitrii Timofeev
4	(China) Tai'an; 12 – 13 May 2018	S	W	(France) Anouck Jaubert	(Indonesia) Sari Agustina	(Indonesia) Aries Susanti Rahayu
5	(Japan) Hachioji; 2 – 3 June 2018	B	M	(Italy) Gabriele Moroni	(Japan) Tomoa Narasaki	(Japan) Rei Sugimoto
5	(Japan) Hachioji; 2 – 3 June 2018	B	W	(Japan) Akiyo Noguchi	(Japan) Miho Nonaka	(Russia) Ekaterina Kipriianova
6	(United States) Vail; 8 – 9 June 2018	B	M	(Japan) Rei Sugimoto	(United States) Sean Bailey	(Japan) Tomoa Narasaki
6	(United States) Vail; 8 – 9 June 2018	B	W	(United States) Alex Puccio	(Japan) Miho Nonaka	(Japan) Akiyo Noguchi
7	(Switzerland) Villars; 6 – 7 July 2018	L	M	(Austria) Jakob Schubert	(France) Romain Desgranges	(Japan) Tomoa Narasaki
7	(Switzerland) Villars; 6 – 7 July 2018	L	W	(Slovenia) Janja Garnbret	(Austria) Jessica Pilz	(South Korea) Jain Kim
7	(Switzerland) Villars; 6 – 7 July 2018	S	M	(Russia) Aleksandr Shikov	(Russia) Aleksandr Shilov	(Ukraine) Danyil Boldyrev
7	(Switzerland) Villars; 6 – 7 July 2018	S	W	(France) Anouck Jaubert	(France) Victoire Andrier	(Russia) Mariia Krasavina
8	(France) Chamonix; 11 – 13 July 2018	L	M	(Italy) Stefano Ghisolfi	(Austria) Jakob Schubert	(Germany) Alex Megos
8	(France) Chamonix; 11 – 13 July 2018	L	W	(Austria) Jessica Pilz	(Slovenia) Janja Garnbret	(South Korea) Jain Kim
8	(France) Chamonix; 11 – 13 July 2018	S	M	(Ukraine) Danyil Boldyrev	(Russia) Dmitrii Timofeev	(France) Bassa Mawem
8	(France) Chamonix; 11 – 13 July 2018	S	W	(Poland) Aleksandra Rudzinska	(Russia) Anna Tsyganova	(Russia) Mariia Krasavina
9	(France) Briançon; 20 – 21 July 2018	L	M	(Germany) Alex Megos	(France) Romain Desgranges	(Slovenia) Domen Škofic
9	(France) Briançon; 20 – 21 July 2018	L	W	(Slovenia) Janja Garnbret	(Austria) Jessica Pilz	(Belgium) Anak Verhoeven
10	(Italy) Arco; 27 – 28 July 2018	L	M	(Austria) Jakob Schubert	(Italy) Stefano Ghisolfi	(Slovenia) Domen Škofic
10	(Italy) Arco; 27 – 28 July 2018	L	W	(Slovenia) Janja Garnbret	(Austria) Jessica Pilz	(Belgium) Anak Verhoeven
10	(Italy) Arco; 27 – 28 July 2018	S	M	(Ukraine) Danyil Boldyrev	(Russia) Aleksandr Shilov	(Iran) Reza Alipour
10	(Italy) Arco; 27 – 28 July 2018	S	W	(Russia) Iuliia Kaplina	(Russia) Mariia Krasavina	(France) Anouck Jaubert
11	(Germany) Munich; 17 – 18 August 2018	B	M	(Slovenia) Gregor Vezonik	(Slovenia) Jernej Kruder	(Austria) Jakob Schubert
11	(Germany) Munich; 17 – 18 August 2018	B	W	(Slovenia) Janja Garnbret	(Japan) Miho Nonaka	(Japan) Akiyo Noguchi
12	(Slovenia) Kranj; 29 – 30 September 2018	L	M	(Italy) Stefano Ghisolfi	(Austria) Jakob Schubert	(Japan) Masahiro Higuchi
12	(Slovenia) Kranj; 29 – 30 September 2018	L	W	(South Korea) Jain Kim	(Slovenia) Janja Garnbret	(Austria) Hannah Schubert
13	(China) Wujiang; 20 – 21 October 2018	L	M	(France) Romain Desgranges	(Austria) Jakob Schubert	(South Korea) Hyunbin Min
13	(China) Wujiang; 20 – 21 October 2018	L	W	(Slovenia) Janja Garnbret (South Korea) Jain Kim	–	(Austria) Jessica Pilz
13	(China) Wujiang; 20 – 21 October 2018	S	M	(Indonesia) Aspar Jaelolo	(Italy) Ludovico Fossali	(Iran) Reza Alipour
13	(China) Wujiang; 20 – 21 October 2018	S	W	(Indonesia) Aries Susanti Rahayu	(France) Anouck Jaubert	(Russia) Iuliia Kaplina
14	(China) Xiamen; 27 – 28 October 2018	L	M	(Slovenia) Domen Škofic	(Italy) Stefano Ghisolfi	(South Korea) Hyunbin Min
14	(China) Xiamen; 27 – 28 October 2018	L	W	(Austria) Jessica Pilz	(Slovenia) Janja Garnbret	(Japan) Akiyo Noguchi
14	(China) Xiamen; 27 – 28 October 2018	S	M	(France) Bassa Mawem	(Indonesia) Aspar Jaelolo	(Iran) Reza Alipour
14	(China) Xiamen; 27 – 28 October 2018	S	W	(Indonesia) Aries Susanti Rahayu	(Russia) Iuliia Kaplina	(France) Anouck Jaubert
OVERALL		B	M	(Slovenia) Jernej Kruder	(Japan) Tomoa Narasaki	(Japan) Rei Sugimoto
OVERALL		B	W	(Japan) Miho Nonaka	(Japan) Akiyo Noguchi	(France) Fanny Gibert
OVERALL		L	M	(Austria) Jakob Schubert	(Italy) Stefano Ghisolfi	(France) Romain Desgranges (Slovenia) Domen Škofic
OVERALL		L	W	(Slovenia) Janja Garnbret	(Austria) Jessica Pilz	(South Korea) Jain Kim
OVERALL		S	M	(France) Bassa Mawem	(Ukraine) Danyil Boldyrev	(Russia) Dmitrii Timofeev
OVERALL		S	W	(France) Anouck Jaubert	(Indonesia) Aries Susanti Rahayu	(Russia) Iuliia Kaplina
OVERALL		C	M	(Austria) Jakob Schubert	(Japan) Tomoa Narasaki	(Japan) Kokoro Fujii
OVERALL		C	W	(Slovenia) Janja Garnbret	(Japan) Akiyo Noguchi	(Japan) Miho Nonaka
NATIONAL TEAMS		B	A	Japan	Slovenia	France
NATIONAL TEAMS		L	A	Austria	Japan	Slovenia
NATIONAL TEAMS		S	A	Russia	Indonesia	France

== Bouldering ==
An overall ranking was determined based upon points, which athletes were awarded for finishing in the top 30 of each individual event. There were seven competitions in the season, but only the best six attempts were counted. The national ranking was the sum of the points of that country's three best male and female athletes. Results displayed in parentheses were not counted.

=== Men ===
The results of the ten most successful athletes of the Bouldering World Cup 2018:

Rank	Name	Points	Munich	Vail	Hachioji	Tai'an	Chongqing	Moscow	Meiringen
1	(Slovenia) Jernej Kruder	442.00	2. 80.00	4. 55.00	8. (38.00)	2. 80.00	6. 47.00	2. 80.00	1. 100.00
2	(Japan) Tomoa Narasaki	400.00	9. 35.00	3. 65.00	2. 80.00	8. 40.00	11. (31.00)	1. 100.00	2. 80.00
3	(Japan) Rei Sugimoto	334.00	8. 40.00	1. 100.00	3. 65.00	4. 55.00	12. (28.00)	10. 34.00	8. 40.00
4	(Russia) Alexey Rubtsov	296.00	14. (23.00)	9. 37.00	5. 51.00	12. 27.00	3. 65.00	5. 51.00	3. 65.00
5	(Slovenia) Gregor Vezonik	280.00	1. 100.00	14. 24.00	-	3. 65.00	13. 26.00	3. 65.00	-
6	(Japan) Kokoro Fujii	260.00	7. 43.00	18. (16.00)	16. 20.00	5. 51.00	1. 100.00	17. 18.00	12. 28.00
7	(South Korea) Chon Jong-won	247.00	-	7. 43.00	4. 55.00	6. 47.00	-	4. 55.00	6. 47.00
8	(Japan) Tomoaki Takata	218.00	17. 18.00	6. 47.00	11. 31.00	10. 34.00	25. (5.00)	9. 37.00	5. 51.00
9	(Japan) Yuji Fujiwaki	207.00	5. 51.00	8. 40.00	13. 26.00	11. 31.00	15. 22.00	28. (3.00)	9. 37.00
9	(Austria) Jakob Schubert	207.00	3. 65.00	-	-	12. 27.00	4. 55.00	25. 5.00	4. 55.00

=== Women ===
The results of the ten most successful athletes of the Bouldering World Cup 2018:

Rank	Name	Points	Munich	Vail	Hachioji	Tai'an	Chongqing	Moscow	Meiringen
1	(Japan) Miho Nonaka	500.00	2. 80.00	2. 80.00	2. 80.00	2. 80.00	2. 80.00	2. (80.00)	1. 100.00
2	(Japan) Akiyo Noguchi	495.00	3. 65.00	3. 65.00	1. 100.00	1. 100.00	1. 100.00	3. 65.00	3. (65.00)
3	(France) Fanny Gibert	320.00	4. 55.00	4. 55.00	7. 43.00	3. 65.00	8. (40.00)	5. 51.00	5. 51.00
4	(Slovenia) Janja Garnbret	280.00	1. 100.00	-	-	-	-	1. 100.00	2. 80.00
5	(Slovenia) Katja Kadic	246.00	5. 51.00	23. (7.00)	11. 31.00	7. 43.00	6. 47.00	10. 34.00	8. 40.00
6	(Serbia) Staša Gejo	222.00	-	-	4. 55.00	4. 55.00	3. 65.00	15. 22.00	13. 25.00
7	(Russia) Ekaterina Kipriianova	210.00	6. 47.00	-	3. 65.00	10. 34.00	4. 55.00	21. 9.00	-
8	(Japan) Futaba Ito	179.00	7. 43.00	-	6. 47.00	13. 26.00	16. 20.00	8. 40.00	27. 3.00
9	(United Kingdom) Shauna Coxsey	174.00	-	7. 43.00	9. 37.00	-	-	6. 47.00	6. 47.00
10	(Germany) Alma Bestvater	168.00	12. 28.00	6. 47.00	5. 51.00	23. 7.00	12. 28.00	23. 7.00	-

=== National Teams ===
The results of the ten most successful countries of the Bouldering World Cup 2018:

Country names as used by the IFSC

Rank	Nation	Points	Munich	Vail	Hachioji	Tai'an	Chongqing	Moscow	Meiringen
1	(Japan)	2269	(337)	387	419	363	371	362	367
2	Slovenia	1344	345	(108)	109	208	139	310	233
3	France	823	163	(91)	102	111	197	93	157
4	Austria	735	173	61	(22)	110	154	64	173
5	(Russia) Russian Federation	591	85	(37)	144	101	121	72	68
6	Germany	534	103	143	69	58	112	49	(27)
7	United States	503	15	284	86	57	9	(3)	52
8	(South Korea) Republic of Korea	418	0	81	75	89	-	98	75
9	(United Kingdom) Great Britain	366	21	74	101	30	(19)	47	93
10	Italy	269	22	(1)	139	24	7	48	29

== Lead ==
An overall ranking was determined based upon points, which athletes were awarded for finishing in the top 30 of each individual event.

=== Men ===
6 best competition results were counted (not counting points in parentheses) for IFSC Climbing Worldcup 2018.

Rank	Name	Points	Xiamen	Wujiang	Kranj	Arco	Briançon	Chamonix	Villars
1	(Austria) Jakob Schubert	495.00	16. (20.00)	2. 80.00	2. 80.00	1. 100.00	4. 55.00	2. 80.00	1. 100.00
2	(Italy) Stefano Ghisolfi	466.00	2. 80.00	5. 51.00	1. 100.00	2. 80.00	5. (51.00)	1. 100.00	4. 55.00
3	(France) Romain Desgranges	356.00	6. 47.00	1. 100.00	20. 12.00	9. 37.00	2. 80.00	27. (4.00)	2. 80.00
3	(Slovenia) Domen Škofic	356.00	1. 100.00	19. (14.00)	12. 28.00	3. 65.00	3. 65.00	4. 55.00	7. 43.00
5	(South Korea) Min Hyun-bin	251.00	3. 65.00	3. 65.00	-	8. 40.00	17. 18.00	18. 16.00	6. 47.00
6	(Germany) Alexander Megos	230.00	-	-	-	12. 28.00	1. 100.00	3. 65.00	9. 37.00
7	(Japan) Taisei Homma	217.00	5. 51.00	8. 40.00	13. 26.00	-	9. 37.00	7. 43.00	16. 20.00
8	(Switzerland) Sascha Lehmann	206.00	8. 40.00	17. 18.00	25. (6.00)	6. 47.00	7. 43.00	8. 40.00	17. 18.00
9	(Japan) Yuki Hada	192.00	7. 43.00	20. (12.00)	7. 43.00	14. 24.00	12. 28.00	19. 14.00	8. 40.00
10	(Italy) Francesco Vettorata	168.00	15. 22.00	6. 47.00	6. 47.00	22. 9.00	20. 12.00	11. 31.00	-

=== Women ===
6 best competition results were counted (not counting points in brackets) for IFSC Climbing Worldcup 2018.

Rank	Name	Points	Xiamen	Wujiang	Kranj	Arco	Briançon	Chamonix	Villars
1	(Slovenia) Janja Garnbret	550.00	2. 80.00	1. 90.00	2. 80.00	1. 100.00	1. 100.00	2. (80.00)	1. 100.00
2	(Austria) Jessica Pilz	505.00	1. 100.00	3. 65.00	4. (55.00)	2. 80.00	2. 80.00	1. 100.00	2. 80.00
3	(South Korea) Jain Kim	354.00	10. 34.00	1. 90.00	1. 100.00	-	-	3. 65.00	3. 65.00
4	(France) Manon Hily	238.00	14. (24.00)	8. 40.00	11. 31.00	6. 47.00	11. 31.00	10. 34.00	4. 55.00
5	(Japan) Mei Kotake	228.00	5. 51.00	13. 26.00	9. 37.00	16. 20.00	-	5. 51.00	7. 43.00
6	(Slovenia) Tjasa Kalan	224.00	7. 43.00	6. 45.00	12. 28.00	9. 37.00	28. (3.00)	9. 37.00	9. 34.00
7	(Austria) Hannah Schubert	219.00	11. 31.00	9. 37.00	3. 65.00	19. (14.00)	13. 26.00	8. 40.00	16. 20.00
8	(Slovenia) Mina Markovič	214.00	6. 47.00	22. (9.00)	8. 40.00	10. 34.00	5. 51.00	12. 28.00	19. 14.00
8	(Japan) Akiyo Noguchi	214.00	3. 65.00	4. 55.00	-	-	-	7. 43.00	5. 51.00
10	(Slovenia) Mia Krampl	211.00	4. 55.00	6. 45.00	10. 34.00	-	7. 43.00	21. 10.00	14. 24.00

=== National Teams ===
For National Team Ranking, 3 best results per competition and category were counted (not counting results in brackets).

Rank	Nation	Points	Xiamen	Wujiang	Kranj	Arco	Briançon	Chamonix	Villars
1	Austria	1528	230	269	264	250	(218)	232	283
2	(Japan)	1468	305	246	242	160	(135)	235	280
3	Slovenia	1428	282	194	(182)	238	266	210	238
4	France	959	95	160	(81)	185	251	84	184
5	Italy	822	118	135	202	111	99	157	(55)
6	(South Korea) Republic of Korea	652	107	177	107	41	(27)	91	129
7	Belgium	382	80	55	(22)	105	65	47	30
8	United States	377	15	13	(0)	108	89	105	47
9	(Switzerland) Suisse	373	40	(18)	67	78	49	71	68
10	(Germany)	340	-	-	23	45	100	111	61

== Speed ==
An overall ranking was determined based upon points, which athletes were awarded for finishing in the top 30 of each individual event.

=== Men ===
7 best competition results were counted (not counting points in brackets) for IFSC Climbing World Cup 2018.

Rank	Name	Points	Xiamen	Wujiang	Arco	Chamonix	Villars	Tai'an	Chongqing	Moscow
1	(France) Bassa Mawem	448.00	1. 100.00	9. 37.00	8. 40.00	3. 65.00	4. 55.00	1. 100.00	5. 51.00	-
2	(Ukraine) Danyil Boldyrev	437.00	14. 24.00	8. 40.00	1. 100.00	1. 100.00	3. 65.00	7. 43.00	3. 65.00	-
3	(Russia) Dmitrii Timofeev	429.00	4. 55.00	7. 43.00	4. 55.00	2. 80.00	11. 31.00	3. 65.00	1. 100.00	15. (22.00)
4	(Iran) Reza Alipour	415.00	3. 65.00	3. 65.00	3. 65.00	9. 37.00	8. 40.00	-	7. 43.00	1. 100.00
5	(Russia) Aleksandr Shilov	358.00	13. 26.00	4. 55.00	2. 80.00	5. 51.00	2. 80.00	10. 34.00	10. 32.00	-
6	(Indonesia) Aspar Jaelolo	341.00	2. 80.00	1. 100.00	-	-	-	4. 55.00	2. 80.00	13. 26.00
7	(Russia) Aleksandr Shikov	289.00	-	16. 20.00	9. 37.00	14. 24.00	1. 100.00	9. 37.00	6. 47.00	14. 24.00
8	(Italy) Ludovico Fossali	272.00	15. 22.00	2. 80.00	15. 22.00	6. 47.00	17. (18.00)	15. 22.00	10. 32.00	6. 47.00
9	(China) Li Jinxin	254.00	7. 43.00	6. 47.00	-	10. 34.00	6. 47.00	-	4. 55.00	12. 28.00
10	(Russia) Vladislav Deulin	237.00	5. 51.00	13. 26.00	5. 51.00	-	-	21. 9.00	16. 20.00	2. 80.00

=== Women ===
7 best competition results were counted (not counting points in brackets) for IFSC Climbing World Cup 2018.

Rank	Name	Points	Xiamen	Wujiang	Arco	Chamonix	Villars	Tai'an	Chongqing	Moscow
1	(France) Anouck Jaubert	550.00	3. 65.00	2. 80.00	3. 65.00	11. (31.00)	1. 100.00	1. 100.00	8. 40.00	1. 100.00
2	(Indonesia) Aries Susanti Rahayu	420.00	1. 100.00	1. 100.00	-	-	-	3. 65.00	1. 100.00	4. 55.00
3	(Russia) Iuliia Kaplina	414.00	2. 80.00	3. 65.00	1. 100.00	13. 26.00	7. 43.00	16. 20.00	16. (20.00)	2. 80.00
4	(Russia) Mariia Krasavina	402.00	7. 43.00	4. 55.00	2. 80.00	3. 65.00	3. 65.00	7. 43.00	9. (37.00)	5. 51.00
5	(Poland) Anna Brozek	299.00	8. 40.00	9. 37.00	5. 51.00	7. 43.00	5. 51.00	4. 55.00	15. 22.00	-
6	(Russia) Elena Timofeeva	298.00	5. 51.00	20. (12.00)	8. 40.00	16. 20.00	17. 18.00	14. 24.00	2. 80.00	3. 65.00
7	(Russia) Anna Tsyganova	292.00	16. 20.00	6. 47.00	-	2. 80.00	-	6. 47.00	4. 55.00	7. 43.00
8	(Russia) Elena Remizova	266.00	4. 55.00	18. 16.00	20. (12.00)	6. 47.00	8. 40.00	9. 37.00	6. 47.00	14. 24.00
9	(Indonesia) Sari Agustina	239.00	9. 37.00	5. 51.00	-	-	-	2. 80.00	7. 43.00	12. 28.00
10	(France) Victoire Andrier	235.00	14. 24.00	12. 28.00	13. 26.00	14. 24.00	2. 80.00	15. 22.00	11. 31.00	20. (12.00)

=== National Teams ===
For National Team Ranking, 3 best results per competition and category were counted (not counting results in brackets).

Rank	Nation	Points	Xiamen	Wujiang	Arco	Chamonix	Villars	Tai'an	Chongqing	Moscow
1	(Russia) Russian Federation	2448	318	316	406	349	359	(280)	369	331
2	Indonesia	1704	328	353	-	-	-	367	351	305
3	France	1568	235	176	183	218	312	289	155	(146)
4	People's Republic of China	1120	191	164	-	189	210	115	192	59
5	Poland	876	106	47	200	234	137	82	70	(44)
6	Italy	710	53	104	131	131	129	(35)	41	121
7	Ukraine	688	48	93	135	106	122	89	95	(25)
8	Islamic Republic of Iran	464	81	74	65	37	40	-	43	124
9	United States	169	0	6	81	18	37	26	1	(0)
10	Czech Republic	167	18	16	43	22	17	-	-	51

== Combined ==
The results of the ten most successful athletes of the Combined World Cup 2018:

=== Men ===
Rank	Name	Points
1	(Austria) Jakob Schubert	48
2	(Japan) Tomoa Narasaki	54
3	(Japan) Kokoro Fujii	960
4	(Japan) Yoshiyuki Ogata	1440
5	(Canada) Sean McColl	4860
6	(Belgium) Nicolas Collin	11520
6	(Japan) Kai Harada	11520
8	(Germany) Jan Hojer	29160
9	(Slovenia) Jernej Kruder	35904
10	(Ukraine) Fedir Samoilov	40320

=== Women ===
Rank	Name	Points
1	(Slovenia) Janja Garnbret	36
2	(Japan) Akiyo Noguchi	360
3	(Japan) Miho Nonaka	450
4	(Austria) Jessica Pilz	1050
5	(Serbia) Staša Gejo	12960
6	(Russia) Anna Tsyganova	15600
7	(Japan) Futaba Ito	18900
8	(South Korea) Jain Kim	21600
8	(United States) Claire Buhrfeind	32400
10	(France) Fanny Gibert	45360

== Season podium table ==
Rank	Nation	Gold	Silver	Bronze	Total
1	Slovenia (SLO)	3	0	1	4
2	Austria (AUT)	2	1	0	3
3	France (FRA)	2	0	2	4
4	Japan (JPN)	1	4	3	8
5	Indonesia (INA)	0	1	0	1
5	Italy (ITA)	0	1	0	1
5	Ukraine (UKR)	0	1	0	1
8	Russia (RUS)	0	0	2	2
9	South Korea (KOR)	0	0	1	1
Totals (9 entries)		8	8	9	25

== Medal table ==
Rank	Nation	Gold	Silver	Bronze	Total
1	Slovenia (SLO)	9	7	4	20
2	Japan (JPN)	7	8	9	24
3	France (FRA)	6	4	4	14
4	Austria (AUT)	4	6	3	13
5	Indonesia (INA)	4	4	3	11
6	Russia (RUS)	3	9	8	20
7	Italy (ITA)	3	3	0	6
8	South Korea (KOR)	2	0	4	6
9	Ukraine (UKR)	2	0	2	4
10	United States (USA)	1	1	0	2
11	Iran (IRN)	1	0	3	4
12	Germany (GER)	1	0	1	2
13	Israel (ISR)	1	0	0	1
13	Poland (POL)	1	0	0	1
15	Canada (CAN)	0	1	0	1
16	Belgium (BEL)	0	0	2	2
17	Serbia (SRB)	0	0	1	1
Totals (17 entries)		45	43	44	132
