= Speed climbing at the 2018 IFSC Climbing World Cup =

- Location: Moscow, Russia Chongqing, China; Tai'an, China; Villars, Switzerland; Chamonix, France; Arco, Italy; Wujiang, China Xiamen, China
- Dates: 21 April – 28 October 2018

Champions
- Men: (France) Bassa Mawem
- Women: (France) Anouck Jaubert

Speed climbing competitions at the 2018 IFSC Climbing World Cup were being held at eight stops. The winners were awarded trophies, and the best three finishers received medals.

At the end of the season an overall ranking was determined based upon points, which athletes were awarded for finishing in the top 30 of each individual event. Bassa Mawem won the men's seasonal title, Anouck Jaubert won the women's seasonal title, and Russian Federation defended its national team title.

== Overall Ranking ==
An overall ranking was determined based upon points, which athletes were awarded for finishing in the top 30 of each individual event.

=== Men ===
7 best competition results were counted (not counting points in brackets) for IFSC Climbing World Cup 2018.

Rank	Name	Points	Xiamen	Wujiang	Arco	Chamonix	Villars	Tai'an	Chongqing	Moscow
1	(France) Bassa Mawem	448.00	1. 100.00	9. 37.00	8. 40.00	3. 65.00	4. 55.00	1. 100.00	5. 51.00	-
2	(Ukraine) Danyil Boldyrev	437.00	14. 24.00	8. 40.00	1. 100.00	1. 100.00	3. 65.00	7. 43.00	3. 65.00	-
3	(Russia) Dmitrii Timofeev	429.00	4. 55.00	7. 43.00	4. 55.00	2. 80.00	11. 31.00	3. 65.00	1. 100.00	15. (22.00)
4	(Iran) Reza Alipour	415.00	3. 65.00	3. 65.00	3. 65.00	9. 37.00	8. 40.00	-	7. 43.00	1. 100.00
5	(Russia) Aleksandr Shilov	358.00	13. 26.00	4. 55.00	2. 80.00	5. 51.00	2. 80.00	10. 34.00	10. 32.00	-
6	(Indonesia) Aspar Jaelolo	341.00	2. 80.00	1. 100.00	-	-	-	4. 55.00	2. 80.00	13. 26.00
7	(Russia) Aleksandr Shikov	289.00	-	16. 20.00	9. 37.00	14. 24.00	1. 100.00	9. 37.00	6. 47.00	14. 24.00
8	(Italy) Ludovico Fossali	272.00	15. 22.00	2. 80.00	15. 22.00	6. 47.00	17. (18.00)	15. 22.00	10. 32.00	6. 47.00
9	(China) JinXin Li	254.00	7. 43.00	6. 47.00	-	10. 34.00	6. 47.00	-	4. 55.00	12. 28.00
10	(Russia) Vladislav Deulin	237.00	5. 51.00	13. 26.00	5. 51.00	-	-	21. 9.00	16. 20.00	2. 80.00

=== Women ===
7 best competition results were counted (not counting points in brackets) for IFSC Climbing World Cup 2018.

Rank	Name	Points	Xiamen	Wujiang	Arco	Chamonix	Villars	Tai'an	Chongqing	Moscow
1	(France) Anouck Jaubert	550.00	3. 65.00	2. 80.00	3. 65.00	11. (31.00)	1. 100.00	1. 100.00	8. 40.00	1. 100.00
2	(Indonesia) Aries Susanti Rahayu	420.00	1. 100.00	1. 100.00	-	-	-	3. 65.00	1. 100.00	4. 55.00
3	(Russia) Iuliia Kaplina	414.00	2. 80.00	3. 65.00	1. 100.00	13. 26.00	7. 43.00	16. 20.00	16. (20.00)	2. 80.00
4	(Russia) Mariia Krasavina	402.00	7. 43.00	4. 55.00	2. 80.00	3. 65.00	3. 65.00	7. 43.00	9. (37.00)	5. 51.00
5	(Poland) Anna Brozek	299.00	8. 40.00	9. 37.00	5. 51.00	7. 43.00	5. 51.00	4. 55.00	15. 22.00	-
6	(Russia) Elena Timofeeva	298.00	5. 51.00	20. (12.00)	8. 40.00	16. 20.00	17. 18.00	14. 24.00	2. 80.00	3. 65.00
7	(Russia) Anna Tsyganova	292.00	16. 20.00	6. 47.00	-	2. 80.00	-	6. 47.00	4. 55.00	7. 43.00
8	(Russia) Elena Remizova	266.00	4. 55.00	18. 16.00	20. (12.00)	6. 47.00	8. 40.00	9. 37.00	6. 47.00	14. 24.00
9	(Indonesia) Sari Agustina	239.00	9. 37.00	5. 51.00	-	-	-	2. 80.00	7. 43.00	12. 28.00
10	(France) Victoire Andrier	235.00	14. 24.00	12. 28.00	13. 26.00	14. 24.00	2. 80.00	15. 22.00	11. 31.00	20. (12.00)

=== National Teams ===
For National Team Ranking, 3 best results per competition and category were counted (not counting results in brackets).

Rank	Nation	Points	Xiamen	Wujiang	Arco	Chamonix	Villars	Tai'an	Chongqing	Moscow
1	(Russia) Russian Federation	2448	318	316	406	349	359	(280)	369	331
2	Indonesia	1704	328	353	-	-	-	367	351	305
3	France	1568	235	176	183	218	312	289	155	(146)
4	People's Republic of China	1120	191	164	-	189	210	115	192	59
5	Poland	876	106	47	200	234	137	82	70	(44)
6	Italy	710	53	104	131	131	129	(35)	41	121
7	Ukraine	688	48	93	135	106	122	89	95	(25)
8	Islamic Republic of Iran	464	81	74	65	37	40	-	43	124
9	United States	169	0	6	81	18	37	26	1	(0)
10	Czech Republic	167	18	16	43	22	17	-	-	51

== Moscow, Russia (21–22 April) ==
=== Men ===
75 athletes attended the World Cup in Moscow. Reza Alipour dominated the finals and won with 5.82s against Vladislav Deulin in the final race. Veddriq Leonardo claimed third place after his teammate Hinayah Muhammad false started.

Round of 16
1	(Iran) Reza Alipour	6.400
16	(China) JinXin Li	6.780
8	(Russia) Stanislav Kokorin	6.260
9	(Italy) Ludovico Fossali	6.080
4	(Russia) Aleksandr Shikov	8.000
13	(Indonesia) Hinayah Muhammad	6.120
5	(Indonesia) Sabri Sabri	6.140
12	(Italy) Alessandro Santoni	6.170
2	(Indonesia) Aspar Jaelolo	7.870
15	(Italy) Leonardo Gontero	6.260
7	(Indonesia) Veddriq Leonardo	6.030
10	(Indonesia) Pangeran Septo Wibowo Siburian	6.110
3	(Russia) Dmitrii Timofeev	10.420
14	(Czech Republic) Jan Kriz	6.580
6	(Russia) Vladislav Deulin	wc
11	(Kazakhstan) Amir Maimuratov	fs

Quarterfinals
1	(Iran) Reza Alipour	5.760
9	(Italy) Ludovico Fossali	6.440
13	(Indonesia) Hinayah Muhammad	wc
5	(Indonesia) Sabri Sabri	fs
15	(Italy) Leonardo Gontero	fs
7	(Indonesia) Veddriq Leonardo	wc
14	(Czech Republic) Jan Kriz	6.110
6	(Russia) Vladislav Deulin	6.040

Semifinals
1	(Iran) Reza Alipour	5.710
13	(Indonesia) Hinayah Muhammad	5.870
7	(Indonesia) Veddriq Leonardo	6.020
6	(Russia) Vladislav Deulin	5.810

Final
1	(Iran) Reza Alipour	5.820
6	(Russia) Vladislav Deulin	6.870
Small final
13	(Indonesia) Hinayah Muhammad	fs
7	(Indonesia) Veddriq Leonardo	wc

=== Women ===
68 athletes attended the World Cup in Moscow. Anouck Jaubert secured victory after Iuliia Kaplina false started in the final race. After a short rest, Jaubert went for a solo run and matched the world record of 7.32 seconds set by Kaplina in the 2017 World Games in Wrocław, Poland. Elena Timofeeva rounded up the podium in third place after winning a race against Aries Susanti Rahayu.

Round of 16
1	(France) Anouck Jaubert	7.680
16	(Indonesia) Puji Lestari	9.860
8	(Russia) Mariia Krasavina	wc
9	(France) Aurelia Sarisson	fs
4	(Indonesia) Sari Agustina	fs
13	(Indonesia) Santi Wellyanti	wc
5	(Russia) Elena Timofeeva	7.990
12	(China) CuiLian He	fall
2	(Russia) Iuliia Kaplina	7.760
15	(France) Elma Fleuret	fall
7	(Indonesia) Rajiah Sallsabillah	wc
10	(Russia) Elizaveta Ivanova	fall
3	(Poland) Aleksandra Kalucka	fs
14	(Indonesia) Aries Susanti Rahayu	wc
6	(Russia) Anna Tsyganova	7.990
11	(Russia) Elena Remizova	fall

Quarterfinals
1	(France) Anouck Jaubert	7.510
8	(Russia) Mariia Krasavina	7.770
13	(Indonesia) Santi Wellyanti	fs
5	(Russia) Elena Timofeeva	wc
2	(Russia) Iuliia Kaplina	7.740
7	(Indonesia) Rajiah Sallsabillah	7.880
14	(Indonesia) Aries Susanti Rahayu	7.390
6	(Russia) Anna Tsyganova	9.520

Semifinals
1	(France) Anouck Jaubert	7.460
5	(Russia) Elena Timofeeva	8.040
2	(Russia) Iuliia Kaplina	7.440
14	(Indonesia) Aries Susanti Rahayu	9.130

Final
1	(France) Anouck Jaubert	7.320
2	(Russia) Iuliia Kaplina	fs
Small final
5	(Russia) Elena Timofeeva	7.610
14	(Indonesia) Aries Susanti Rahayu	8.470

== Chongqing, China (5–6 May) ==
=== Men ===
62 athletes attended the World Cup in Chongqing. Dmitrii Timofeev won.

Round of 16
1	(Iran) Reza Alipour	5.890
16	(Italy) Ludovico Fossali	6.190
8	(Russia) Vladislav Deulin	9.830
9	(China) JinXin Li	6.140
4	(Indonesia) Aspar Jaelolo	6.430
13	(Indonesia) Pangeran Septo Wibowo Siburian	6.930
5	(Russia) Stanislav Kokorin	6.120
12	(Russia) Arsenii Bogomolov	6.250
2	(France) Bassa Mawem	5.940
15	(Russia) Aleksandr Shilov	6.190
7	(Ukraine) Danyil Boldyrev	5.950
10	(Indonesia) Sabri Sabri	6.220
3	(Russia) Aleksandr Shikov	6.100
14	(China) PengHui LIN	6.200
6	(Russia) Dmitrii Timofeev	5.940
11	(Indonesia) Hinayah Muhammad	6.090

Quarterfinals
1	(Iran) Reza Alipour	7.140
9	(China) JinXin Li	5.930
4	(Indonesia) Aspar Jaelolo	5.900
5	(Russia) Stanislav Kokorin	7.590
2	(France) Bassa Mawem	5.800
7	(Ukraine) Danyil Boldyrev	5.790
3	(Russia) Aleksandr Shikov	6.080
6	(Russia) Dmitrii Timofeev	5.870

Semifinals
9	(China) JinXin Li	7.240
4	(Indonesia) Aspar Jaelolo	5.810
7	(Ukraine) Danyil Boldyrev	5.750
6	(Russia) Dmitrii Timofeev	5.690

Final
4	(Indonesia) Aspar Jaelolo	6.830
6	(Russia) Dmitrii Timofeev	5.760
Small final
9	(China) JinXin Li	5.880
7	(Ukraine) Danyil Boldyrev	5.730

=== Women ===
43 athletes attended the World Cup in Chongqing. Aries Susanti Rahayu won.

Round of 16
1	(Indonesia) Aries Susanti Rahayu	8.080
16	(Poland) Klaudia Buczek	8.920
8	(Indonesia) Sari Agustina	8.130
9	(Indonesia) Iqomah Nurul	8.250
4	(China) CuiLian He	8.340
13	(Poland) Anna Brozek	9.350
5	(Russia) Anna Tsyganova	8.320
12	(China) YiLing SONG	8.800
2	(Russia) Iuliia Kaplina	10.130
15	(Russia) Elena Remizova	8.720
7	(Indonesia) Puji Lestari	7.920
10	(Indonesia) Rajiah Sallsabillah	8.570
3	(France) Anouck Jaubert	7.900
14	(France) Victoire Andrier	8.530
6	(Russia) Mariia Krasavina	8.030
11	(Russia) Elena Timofeeva	7.920

Quarterfinals
1	(Indonesia) Aries Susanti Rahayu	7.780
8	(Indonesia) Sari Agustina	8.170
4	(China) CuiLian He	7.940
5	(Russia) Anna Tsyganova	7.920
15	(Russia) Elena Remizova	8.070
7	(Indonesia) Puji Lestari	7.920
3	(France) Anouck Jaubert	9.400
11	(Russia) Elena Timofeeva	8.430

Semifinals
1	(Indonesia) Aries Susanti Rahayu	8.350
5	(Russia) Anna Tsyganova	9.830
7	(Indonesia) Puji Lestari	fs
11	(Russia) Elena Timofeeva	wc

Final
1	(Indonesia) Aries Susanti Rahayu	7.510
11	(Russia) Elena Timofeeva	9.010
Small final
5	(Russia) Anna Tsyganova	fall
7	(Indonesia) Puji Lestari	8.110

== Tai'an, China (12–13 May) ==
=== Men ===
68 athletes attended the World Cup in Tai'an. Bassa Mawem won.

Round of 16
1	(Indonesia) Aspar Jaelolo	5.990
16	(China) PengHui LIN	6.130
8	(Indonesia) Hinayah Muhammad	5.950
9	(Russia) Arsenii Bogomolov	8.060
4	(Russia) Aleksandr Shikov	5.960
13	(Indonesia) Alfian Muhammad	5.940
5	(Indonesia) Sabri Sabri	5.970
12	(Italy) Ludovico Fossali	6.670
2	(France) Bassa Mawem	5.780
15	(United States) John Brosler	6.190
7	(Russia) Stanislav Kokorin	6.030
10	(Indonesia) Pangeran Septo Wibowo Siburian	6.300
3	(Ukraine) Danyil Boldyrev	5.820
14	(Russia) Aleksandr Shilov	5.960
6	(Russia) Dmitrii Timofeev	5.890
11	(Indonesia) Sufriyanto Rindi	6.070

Quarterfinals
1	(Indonesia) Aspar Jaelolo	wc
8	(Indonesia) Hinayah Muhammad	fs
13	(Indonesia) Alfian Muhammad	7.310
5	(Indonesia) Sabri Sabri	5.850
2	(France) Bassa Mawem	5.670
7	(Russia) Stanislav Kokorin	5.940
3	(Ukraine) Danyil Boldyrev	fs
6	(Russia) Dmitrii Timofeev	wc

Semifinals
1	(Indonesia) Aspar Jaelolo	5.710
5	(Indonesia) Sabri Sabri	5.700
2	(France) Bassa Mawem	5.610
6	(Russia) Dmitrii Timofeev	6.740

Final
5	(Indonesia) Sabri Sabri	5.750
2	(France) Bassa Mawem	5.680
Small final
1	(Indonesia) Aspar Jaelolo	fs
6	(Russia) Dmitrii Timofeev	wc

=== Women ===
39 athletes attended the World Cup in Tai'an. Anouck Jaubert won.

Round of 16
1	(Russia) Iuliia Kaplina	fall
16	(Poland) Anna Brozek	8.550
8	(China) CuiLian He	8.710
9	(Russia) Anna Tsyganova	8.050
4	(Russia) Mariia Krasavina	7.910
13	(Ukraine) Alla Marenych	8.340
5	(Indonesia) Sari Agustina	8.190
12	(France) Victoire Andrier	9.040
2	(France) Anouck Jaubert	8.010
15	(Indonesia) Santi Wellyanti	8.770
7	(Russia) Elena Timofeeva	8.840
10	(France) Aurelia Sarisson	7.820
3	(Indonesia) Aries Susanti Rahayu	7.400
14	(China) MingWei NI	8.380
6	(Indonesia) Rajiah Sallsabillah	7.800
11	(Russia) Elena Remizova	7.840

Quarterfinals
16	(Poland) Anna Brozek	8.150
9	(Russia) Anna Tsyganova	8.210
4	(Russia) Mariia Krasavina	8.240
5	(Indonesia) Sari Agustina	7.840
2	(France) Anouck Jaubert	7.850
10	(France) Aurelia Sarisson	8.100
3	(Indonesia) Aries Susanti Rahayu	7.430
6	(Indonesia) Rajiah Sallsabillah	9.780

Semifinals
16	(Poland) Anna Brozek	9.320
5	(Indonesia) Sari Agustina	7.840
2	(France) Anouck Jaubert	7.640
3	(Indonesia) Aries Susanti Rahayu	9.130

Final
5	(Indonesia) Sari Agustina	7.740
2	(France) Anouck Jaubert	7.620
Small final
16	(Poland) Anna Brozek	9.170
3	(Indonesia) Aries Susanti Rahayu	8.860

== Villars, Switzerland (6–7 July) ==
=== Men ===
68 athletes attended the World Cup in Villars. Aleksandr Shikov won.

Round of 16
1	(France) Bassa Mawem	5.880
16	(United States) Michael Finn-Henry	6.760
8	(Ukraine) Kostiantyn Pavlenko	6.120
9	(Poland) Marcin Dzieński	fall
4	(Iran) Reza Alipour	6.040
13	(Russia) Dmitrii Timofeev	16.340
5	(Russia) Aleksandr Shilov	6.270
12	(Italy) Alessandro Santoni	fall
2	(Ukraine) Danyil Boldyrev	wc
15	(Russia) Lev Rudatskiy	fs
7	(China) PengHui LIN	6.770
10	(China) JinXin Li	6.200
3	(Russia) Aleksandr Shikov	6.170
14	(Italy) Leonardo Gontero	fall
6	(Russia) Stanislav Kokorin	fall
11	(France) Guillaume Moro	6.320

Quarterfinals
1	(France) Bassa Mawem	5.820
8	(Ukraine) Kostiantyn Pavlenko	6.590
4	(Iran) Reza Alipour	fs
5	(Russia) Aleksandr Shilov	wc
2	(Ukraine) Danyil Boldyrev	6.600
10	(China) JinXin Li	7.510
3	(Russia) Aleksandr Shikov	6.280
11	(France) Guillaume Moro	8.500

Semifinals
1	(France) Bassa Mawem	9.980
5	(Russia) Aleksandr Shilov	6.110
2	(Ukraine) Danyil Boldyrev	8.090
3	(Russia) Aleksandr Shikov	6.530

Final
5	(Russia) Aleksandr Shilov	6.790
3	(Russia) Aleksandr Shikov	6.670
Small final
1	(France) Bassa Mawem	fall
2	(Ukraine) Danyil Boldyrev	6.000

=== Women ===
53 athletes attended the World Cup in Villars. Anouck Jaubert won.

Round of 16
1	(Russia) Mariia Krasavina	8.690
16	(France) Elma Fleuret	fall
8	(Poland) Klaudia Buczek	8.860
9	(Russia) Elena Remizova	8.430
4	(Poland) Patrycja Chudziak	fall
13	(Italy) Elisabetta Dalla Brida	9.050
5	(France) Victoire Andrier	8.330
12	(Russia) Elizaveta Ivanova	9.170
2	(France) Anouck Jaubert	8.420
15	(China) MingWei NI	8.470
7	(Poland) Anna Brozek	8.380
10	(China) CuiLian He	11.050
3	(Russia) Iuliia Kaplina	wc
14	(France) Aurelia Sarisson	fs
6	(China) YiLing SONG	wc
11	(Russia) Daria Kan	fs

Quarterfinals
1	(Russia) Mariia Krasavina	8.100
9	(Russia) Elena Remizova	10.670
13	(Italy) Elisabetta Dalla Brida	8.820
5	(France) Victoire Andrier	8.400
2	(France) Anouck Jaubert	7.830
7	(Poland) Anna Brozek	8.240
3	(Russia) Iuliia Kaplina	8.930
6	(China) YiLing SONG	8.200

Semifinals
1	(Russia) Mariia Krasavina	13.160
5	(France) Victoire Andrier	8.570
2	(France) Anouck Jaubert	8.290
6	(China) YiLing SONG	8.650

Final
5	(France) Victoire Andrier	8.210
2	(France) Anouck Jaubert	7.980
Small final
1	(Russia) Mariia Krasavina	9.620
6	(China) YiLing SONG	fall

== Chamonix, France (11–13 July) ==
=== Men ===
83 athletes attended the World Cup in Chamonix. Danyil Boldyrev won.

Round of 16
1	(France) Bassa Mawem	wc
16	(Italy) Leonardo Gontero	fs
8	(Russia) Aleksandr Shilov	wc
9	(Russia) Aleksandr Shikov	fs
4	(Italy) Ludovico Fossali	6.050
13	(Czech Republic) Jan Kriz	fall
5	(Ukraine) Danyil Boldyrev	5.990
12	(Kazakhstan) Amir Maimuratov	9.960
2	(Iran) Reza Alipour	6.460
15	(Italy) Gian Luca Zodda	6.210
7	(Russia) Dmitrii Timofeev	6.220
10	(China) JinXin Li	6.730
3	(China) QiXin Zhong	7.310
14	(France) Guillaume Moro	7.830
6	(Russia) Stanislav Kokorin	fall
11	(Poland) Marcin Dzieński	6.120

Quarterfinals
1	(France) Bassa Mawem	5.630
8	(Russia) Aleksandr Shilov	5.720
4	(Italy) Ludovico Fossali	5.890
5	(Ukraine) Danyil Boldyrev	5.820
15	(Italy) Gian Luca Zodda	6.040
7	(Russia) Dmitrii Timofeev	5.930
3	(China) QiXin Zhong	wc
11	(Poland) Marcin Dzieński	fs

Semifinals
1	(France) Bassa Mawem	5.950
5	(Ukraine) Danyil Boldyrev	5.810
7	(Russia) Dmitrii Timofeev	6.130
3	(China) QiXin Zhong	6.710

Final
5	(Ukraine) Danyil Boldyrev	6.080
7	(Russia) Dmitrii Timofeev	6.310
Small final
1	(France) Bassa Mawem	5.640
3	(China) QiXin Zhong	fall

=== Women ===
62 athletes attended the World Cup in Chamonix. Aleksandra Rudzinska won.

Round of 16
1	(Poland) Aleksandra Rudzinska	7.800
16	(Russia) Elizaveta Ivanova	8.190
8	(Poland) Aleksandra Kalucka	7.820
9	(France) Victoire Andrier	fall
4	(Russia) Mariia Krasavina	8.020
13	(Russia) Elena Timofeeva	fall
5	(Poland) Patrycja Chudziak	8.390
12	(Russia) Elena Remizova	8.270
2	(France) Anouck Jaubert	8.310
15	(China) MingWei NI	8.300
7	(Russia) Anna Tsyganova	wc
10	(China) CuiLian He	fs
3	(Russia) Iuliia Kaplina	fs
14	(Poland) Anna Brozek	wc
6	(France) Aurelia Sarisson	8.150
11	(China) YiLing SONG	8.190

Quarterfinals
1	(Poland) Aleksandra Rudzinska	7.610
8	(Poland) Aleksandra Kalucka	8.440
4	(Russia) Mariia Krasavina	8.070
12	(Russia) Elena Remizova	8.700
15	(China) MingWei NI	9.800
7	(Russia) Anna Tsyganova	8.140
14	(Poland) Anna Brozek	8.950
6	(France) Aurelia Sarisson	8.070

Semifinals
1	(Poland) Aleksandra Rudzinska	7.590
4	(Russia) Mariia Krasavina	8.640
7	(Russia) Anna Tsyganova	7.830
6	(France) Aurelia Sarisson	8.010

Final
1	(Poland) Aleksandra Rudzinska	7.470
7	(Russia) Anna Tsyganova	7.750
Small final
4	(Russia) Mariia Krasavina	8.180
6	(France) Aurelia Sarisson	11.270

== Arco, Italy (27–28 July) ==
=== Men ===
72 athletes attended the World Cup in Arco. Danyil Boldyrev won.

Round of 16
1	(Russia) Dmitrii Timofeev	5.910
16	(Russia) Aleksandr Shikov	6.000
8	(Czech Republic) Jan Kriz	6.160
9	(Italy) Leonardo Gontero	6.320
4	(Ukraine) Kostiantyn Pavlenko	6.270
13	(Russia) Vladislav Deulin	6.230
5	(Ukraine) Danyil Boldyrev	5.850
12	(Russia) Stanislav Kokorin	6.100
2	(Iran) Reza Alipour	5.650
15	(Italy) Ludovico Fossali	6.600
7	(Italy) Alessandro Santoni	7.130
10	(Poland) Marcin Dzieński	6.230
3	(Russia) Aleksandr Shilov	6.210
14	(Russia) Lev Rudatskiy	6.340
6	(France) Bassa Mawem	5.770
11	(United States) John Brosler	6.320

Quarterfinals
1	(Russia) Dmitrii Timofeev	6.690
8	(Czech Republic) Jan Kriz	6.800
13	(Russia) Vladislav Deulin	6.110
5	(Ukraine) Danyil Boldyrev	5.790
2	(Iran) Reza Alipour	5.750
10	(Poland) Marcin Dzieński	6.490
3	(Russia) Aleksandr Shilov	5.880
6	(France) Bassa Mawem	fall

Semifinals
1	(Russia) Dmitrii Timofeev	6.550
5	(Ukraine) Danyil Boldyrev	5.830
2	(Iran) Reza Alipour	6.110
3	(Russia) Aleksandr Shilov	6.040

Final
5	(Ukraine) Danyil Boldyrev	5.580
3	(Russia) Aleksandr Shilov	5.700
Small final
1	(Russia) Dmitrii Timofeev	6.260
2	(Iran) Reza Alipour	5.590

=== Women ===
50 athletes attended the World Cup in Arco. Iuliia Kaplina won.

Round of 16
1	(France) Anouck Jaubert	8.070
16	(Austria) Alexandra Elmer	9.110
8	(France) Victoire Andrier	9.570
9	(Poland) Natalia Kalucka	9.350
4	(Poland) Anna Brozek	8.190
13	(Russia) Daria Kan	9.880
5	(Russia) Mariia Krasavina	7.940
12	(Ecuador) Andrea Rojas	8.580
2	(Russia) Iuliia Kaplina	8.040
15	(France) Capucine Viglione	15.710
7	(Poland) Patrycja Chudziak	8.310
10	(Italy) Elisabetta Dalla Brida	8.590
3	(Poland) Aleksandra Kalucka	8.590
14	(United States) Piper Kelly	8.910
6	(Russia) Elena Timofeeva	8.280
11	(Poland) Klaudia Buczek	fall

Quarterfinals
1	(France) Anouck Jaubert	7.940
9	(Poland) Natalia Kalucka	8.620
4	(Poland) Anna Brozek	7.809
5	(Russia) Mariia Krasavina	7.806
2	(Russia) Iuliia Kaplina	7.770
7	(Poland) Patrycja Chudziak	8.090
3	(Poland) Aleksandra Kalucka	7.640
6	(Russia) Elena Timofeeva	10.210

Semifinals
1	(France) Anouck Jaubert	fall
5	(Russia) Mariia Krasavina	7.590
2	(Russia) Iuliia Kaplina	9.100
3	(Poland) Aleksandra Kalucka	9.250

Final
5	(Russia) Mariia Krasavina	7.650
2	(Russia) Iuliia Kaplina	7.410
Small final
1	(France) Anouck Jaubert	7.591
3	(Poland) Aleksandra Kalucka	7.592

== Wujiang, China (20–21 October) ==
=== Men ===
36 athletes attended the World Cup in Wujiang. Both Reza Alipourshenazandifar from Iran and Ludovico Fossali of Italy barely made it out of the opening round with hundredth of seconds results, Aleskandr Shilov of Russia ended Danyil Boldyrev of Ukraine winning streak In the quarterfinal, and Aspar Jaelolo of Indonesia took the gold medal after defeating Alipourshenazandifar in the semi-finals and Fossali in the final race. Alipourshenazandifar claimed third place after besting Aleskandr Shilov of Russia in the small final.

Round of 16
1	(Russia) Aleksandr Shikov	fall
16	(Russia) Aleksandr Shilov	6.200
8	(Ukraine) Danyil Boldyrev	6.180
9	(Russia) Vladislav Deulin	6.400
4	(Russia) Dmitrii Timofeev	6.370
13	(Italy) Gian Luca Zodda	6.540
5	(Indonesia) Alfian Muhammad	6.120
12	(Italy) Ludovico Fossali	6.110
2	(Indonesia) Aspar Jaelolo	6.070
15	(Ukraine) Kostiantyn Pavlenko	6.290
7	(Indonesia) Veddriq Leonardo	7.220
10	(China) JinXin Li	6.330
3	(France) Bassa Mawem	5.950
14	(Iran) Reza Alipour	5.900
6	(Russia) Sergei Rukin	6.200
11	(Indonesia) Pangeran Septo Wibowo Siburian	6.300

Quarterfinals
16	(Russia) Aleksandr Shilov	6.240
8	(Ukraine) Danyil Boldyrev	6.540
4	(Russia) Dmitrii Timofeev	6.270
12	(Italy) Ludovico Fossali	6.070
2	(Indonesia) Aspar Jaelolo	5.710
10	(China) JinXin Li	6.160
14	(Iran) Reza Alipour	5.830
6	(Russia) Sergei Rukin	5.920

Semifinals
16	(Russia) Aleksandr Shilov	6.070
12	(Italy) Ludovico Fossali	5.900
2	(Indonesia) Aspar Jaelolo	5.710
14	(Iran) Reza Alipour	5.800

Final
12	(Italy) Ludovico Fossali	5.940
2	(Indonesia) Aspar Jaelolo	5.810
Small final
16	(Russia) Aleksandr Shilov	5.990
14	(Iran) Reza Alipour	5.960

=== Women ===
33 athletes attended the World Cup in Wujiang. Anouck Jaubert outperformed teammate Victoire Andrier of France in the opening race, bested Sari Agustina of Indonesia with a time under 8 seconds in the quarterfinal, and overtook Mariia Krasavina of Russia by less than a second. In the final race, Jaubert was slower than Aries Susanti Rahayu by 0.3s and took silver medal, gold for Aries, and with it secured the speed season title. Iuliia Kaplina took third place after edging out her teammate Mariia Krasavina of Russia.

Round of 16
1	(Russia) Mariia Krasavina	8.530
16	(Ukraine) Tetiana Kolkotina	9.470
8	(Indonesia) Iqomah Nurul	fall
9	(China) MingWei NI	9.250
4	(Indonesia) Sari Agustina	8.310
13	(China) CuiLian He	8.660
5	(France) Anouck Jaubert	8.190
12	(France) Victoire Andrier	8.950
2	(Russia) Iuliia Kaplina	8.030
15	(France) Aurelia Sarisson	9.010
7	(Poland) Anna Brozek	8.500
10	(Russia) Anna Tsyganova	8.440
3	(Indonesia) Aries Susanti Rahayu	8.130
14	(Russia) Ekaterina Barashchuk	9.020
6	(Indonesia) Puji Lestari	8.370
11	(Indonesia) Rajiah Sallsabillah	8.800

Quarterfinals
1	(Russia) Mariia Krasavina	7.990
9	(China) MingWei NI	8.920
4	(Indonesia) Sari Agustina	8.110
5	(France) Anouck Jaubert	7.980
2	(Russia) Iuliia Kaplina	8.000
10	(Russia) Anna Tsyganova	8.300
3	(Indonesia) Aries Susanti Rahayu	8.020
6	(Indonesia) Puji Lestari	9.750

Semifinals
1	(Russia) Mariia Krasavina	8.890
5	(France) Anouck Jaubert	8.090
2	(Russia) Iuliia Kaplina	8.400
3	(Indonesia) Aries Susanti Rahayu	7.860

Final
5	(France) Anouck Jaubert	8.010
3	(Indonesia) Aries Susanti Rahayu	7.740
Small final
1	(Russia) Mariia Krasavina	7.870
2	(Russia) Iuliia Kaplina	7.650

== Xiamen, China (27–28 October) ==
=== Men ===
35 athletes attended the World Cup in Xiamen. Bassa Mawem won after a tight race against Aspar Jaelolo in the final race. Reza Alipour clinched bronze medal after Dmitrii Timofeev fell in the small final.

Round of 16
1	(France) Bassa Mawem	5.880
16	(China) PengHui LIN	fall
8	(Indonesia) Alfian Muhammad	5.950
9	(Indonesia) Veddriq Leonardo	6.050
4	(Russia) Dmitrii Timofeev	6.010
13	(Italy) Gian Luca Zodda	6.270
5	(China) QiXin Zhong	6.040
12	(Russia) Aleksandr Shilov	7.430
2	(Indonesia) Aspar Jaelolo	7.550
15	(Italy) Ludovico Fossali	fall
7	(Russia) Vladislav Deulin	5.900
10	(Indonesia) Sabri Sabri	5.970
3	(Iran) Reza Alipour	6.070
14	(France) Guillaume Moro	6.560
6	(Ukraine) Danyil Boldyrev	8.530
11	(China) JinXin Li	6.070

Quarterfinals
1	(France) Bassa Mawem	wc
8	(Indonesia) Alfian Muhammad	fs
4	(Russia) Dmitrii Timofeev	5.760
5	(China) QiXin Zhong	5.970
2	(Indonesia) Aspar Jaelolo	5.710
7	(Russia) Vladislav Deulin	5.950
3	(Iran) Reza Alipour	5.860
11	(China) JinXin Li	6.750

Semifinals
1	(France) Bassa Mawem	5.820
4	(Russia) Dmitrii Timofeev	8.880
2	(Indonesia) Aspar Jaelolo	5.560
3	(Iran) Reza Alipour	5.670

Final
1	(France) Bassa Mawem	5.600
2	(Indonesia) Aspar Jaelolo	5.620
Small final
4	(Russia) Dmitrii Timofeev	fall
3	(Iran) Reza Alipour	7.600

=== Women ===
37 athletes attended the World Cup in Xiamen. Aries Susanti Rahayu won after Iuliia Kaplina fell in the final race. Anouck Jaubert took third place after besting Elena Remizova in the small final.

Round of 16
1	(Russia) Iuliia Kaplina	7.580
16	(France) Victoire Andrier	9.050
8	(Russia) Anna Tsyganova	fall
9	(Poland) Patrycja Chudziak	8.140
4	(Russia) Elena Remizova	8.180
13	(China) MingWei NI	9.600
5	(Russia) Mariia Krasavina	8.290
12	(China) CuiLian He	8.360
2	(France) Anouck Jaubert	8.000
15	(Indonesia) Rajiah Sallsabillah	8.640
7	(Poland) Anna Brozek	8.390
10	(China) YiLing SONG	8.500
3	(Indonesia) Puji Lestari	8.280
14	(Russia) Elena Timofeeva	7.990
6	(Indonesia) Aries Susanti Rahayu	8.080
11	(Indonesia) Sari Agustina	8.230

Quarterfinals
1	(Russia) Iuliia Kaplina	8.030
9	(Poland) Patrycja Chudziak	8.640
4	(Russia) Elena Remizova	7.920
5	(Russia) Mariia Krasavina	9.790
2	(France) Anouck Jaubert	7.910
7	(Poland) Anna Brozek	fall
14	(Russia) Elena Timofeeva	7.900
6	(Indonesia) Aries Susanti Rahayu	7.890

Semifinals
1	(Russia) Iuliia Kaplina	7.400
4	(Russia) Elena Remizova	7.880
2	(France) Anouck Jaubert	8.650
6	(Indonesia) Aries Susanti Rahayu	7.610

Final
1	(Russia) Iuliia Kaplina	fall
6	(Indonesia) Aries Susanti Rahayu	7.532
Small final
4	(Russia) Elena Remizova	7.995
2	(France) Anouck Jaubert	7.947
