= Susanti =

Susanti is a surname. Notable people with the surname include:

- Aries Susanti Rahayu (born 1995), Indonesian climbing athlete
- Susi Susanti (born 1971), Indonesian badminton player
