= Aries Susanti Rahayu =

Indonesian rock climber (born 1995)

Personal information
- Born: 21 March 1995 (age 31) Grobogan, Central Java, Indonesia
- Education: Universitas Muhammadiyah Semarang

Climbing career
- Type of climber: Competition speed climbing
Medal record
Women's competition climbing
Representing Indonesia
World Cup (Season)
Silver medal – second place	2018	Speed
Bronze medal – third place	2019	Speed
Asian Games
Gold medal – first place	2018 Jakarta–Palembang	Speed
Gold medal – first place	2018 Jakarta–Palembang	Speed relay
Asian Championships
Gold medal – first place	2017 Tehran	Speed relay
Bronze medal – third place	2017 Tehran	Speed
Bronze medal – third place	2018 Kurayoshi	Speed

Aries Susanti Rahayu (born 21 March 1995) is an Indonesian competition climber who specializes in competition speed climbing competitions. She has been nicknamed "Spiderwoman". She was the world record holder for women in speed climbing, which she achieved by clocking a time of 6.995 seconds at the 2019 IFSC Xiamen World Cup. Also, this made her the first woman to climb a speed wall in less than seven seconds.

== Biography ==
As a child, she used to climb trees at home and parks. In 2007, she was introduced to sport climbing by her teacher when she was still a junior high school student.

In 2017, she competed in the Climbing World Cup for the first time and got her first medal (silver) at the World Cup in Xiamen. In the 2017 Asian Championships in Tehran, she was third in speed.

In 2018, she got her first gold medal at the Climbing World Cup in Chongqing. Then, she got one bronze in Tai'an and two more gold medals at the World Cups in Wujiang and Xiamen, all in China. At the end of the 2018 season, she was second in the overall ranking in the speed discipline. In the same year, at the Asian Championships in Kurayoshi, she was third after she false-started in the semifinal.

In 2019, she became the women's world record holder in competition speed climbing, which she achieved by clocking a time of 6.995 seconds at the 2019 IFSC Xiamen World Cup. As well, this made her the first woman to climb a speed wall in less than seven seconds.

Also in 2019, she was on the Forbes Asia's 30 Under 30 list.

Aries is a Muslim and wears hijab while she competes.

== Awards and nominations ==
Award	Year	Category	Result	Ref.
Golden Award SIWO PWI	2019	Best Female Athlete	Won	
Golden Award SIWO PWI	2020	Favorite Female Athlete	Won	
Indonesian Sport Awards	2018	Favorite Female Athlete	Nominated	
Forbes	2019	30 Under 30 Asia (Entertainment and Sports)	Placed	

== Achievements ==
=== Asian Games ===
Women's speed

Year	Venue	Opponent	Time (s)	Result	Ref
2018	Jakabaring Sport City, Palembang, Indonesia	(Indonesia) Puji Lestari	7.612 - 7.980	(gold) Gold	

Women's speed relay

Year	Venue	Partner	Opponent	Time (s)	Result	Ref
2018	Jakabaring Sport City, Palembang, Indonesia	(Indonesia) Fitriyani (Indonesia) Puji Lestari (Indonesia) Rajiah Sallsabillah	(China) Deng Lijuan (China) Niu Di (China) Pan Xuhua	25.452–fall	(gold) Gold	

=== Asian Championships ===
Women's speed

Year	Venue	Opponent	Time (s)	Result	Ref
2017	Mega Pars Complex, Tehran, Iran	(Indonesia) Santi Wellyanti	9.100–10.070	(bronze) Bronze	
2018	Kurayoshi, Japan	(Indonesia) Nurul Iqamah	7.816–9.717	(bronze) Bronze	

Women's speed relay

Year	Venue	Partner	Opponent	Time (s)	Result	Ref
2017	Mega Pars Complex, Tehran, Iran	(Indonesia) Puji Lestari (Indonesia) Santi Wellyanti	(Indonesia) Fitriyani (Indonesia) Rajiah Sallsabillah (Indonesia) Dhorifatus Syafi'iyah	27.97–fall	(gold) Gold	

=== IFSC Climbing World Cup ===
Women's speed

Year	Venue	Opponent	Time (s)	Result	Ref
2017	Xiamen, China	(France) Anouck Jaubert	10.150–7.780	(silver) Silver	
2018	Chongqing, China	(Russia) Elena Timofeeva	7.510–9.010	(gold) Gold	
2018	Tai'an, China	(Poland) Anna Brozek	8.860–9.170	(bronze) Bronze	
2018	Wujiang, China	(France) Anouck Jaubert	7.740–8.010	(gold) Gold	
2018	Xiamen, China	(Russia) Iuliia Kaplina	7.532–fall	(gold) Gold	
2019	Wujiang, China	(Poland) Aleksandra Rudzinska	7.607–7.313	(silver) Silver	
2019	Xiamen, China	(China) Song Yiling	6.995–9.032	(gold) Gold	

=== Other international competitions ===
Women's speed

Year	Venue	Opponent	Time (s)	Result	Ref
2018	The Belt and Road International, Huai'an, China	(China) He Cuilian	7.93–8.86	(gold) Gold	

== World records ==
Women's World Record History
Date	Time (s)	Location	Competition
October 19, 2019	6.99	Xiamen, China	World Cup

== Rankings ==
=== Climbing World Cup ===
Discipline	2017	2018	2019
Speed	13	2	3

=== Asian Championships ===
Discipline	2017	2018
Speed	3	3

== Number of medals in the Climbing World Cup ==
=== Speed ===
Season	Gold	Silver	Bronze	Total
2017		1		1
2018	3		1	4
2019	1	1		2
Total	4	2	1	7
