= Collapse of Siji Kaiyuan Hotel =

Collapse at a hotel in Songling, China

- Location within Jiangsu
- Date: 12 July 2021; 5 years ago
- Time: 15:33 (CST, UTC+8)
- Location: 188 Youche Road, Songling, Suzhou, Jiangsu; 31°10′14″N 120°39′13″E
- Cause: Overloading resulting from illegal construction
- Deaths: 17
- Injuries: 5

An anex of Siji Kaiyuan Hotel (四季开源酒店), in Songling, Suzhou, Jiangsu, China, collapsed due to illegal construction on 12 July 2021, killing 17 people and injuring another five.

== Background ==
Nearby merchants said that the collapsed building was very old and was being renovated. The first floor was the main hall, which was used to open a hotel, and the second and third floors were used for accommodation.

== Collapse ==
At 3:33 pm on 12 July 2021, an annex to the Siji Kaiyuan Hotel suddenly collapsed.

== Rescue ==
After the collapse, Jiangsu Fire Brigade sent six heavy rescue teams, five light rescue teams, five search and rescue dogs, more than 120 fire engines and 650 soldiers to rescue the victims. Lou Qinjian, party chief of CPC Jiangsu Provincial Committee, and Wu Zhenglong, governor of Jiangsu, issued instructions, demanding scientific organization of search and rescue, full treatment of the wounded, minimizing casualties and preventing secondary disasters. Wu Zhenglong, Fan Jinlong and the main leaders of Suzhou and Wujiang District rushed to the scene to organize and command the rescue at the first time. The Ministry of Emergency Management and Ministry of Housing and Urban-Rural Development send working groups to the scene to guide the rescue work.

On July 13, Lou Qinjian, the top political position in the province, rushed to the scene to command rescue and disposal work.

At 9:00 on July 14, the search and rescue work ended. A total of 23 people were rescued, one of them returned home uninjured, five were injured and 17 were killed.

== Investigation ==
A preliminary investigation found the collapse was caused by the owner altering the structure of the building. On 13 July 2021, the actual controller of the hotel has been taken away for investigation by local police.

== See also ==
- Collapse of Xinjia Express Hotel – A similar collapse in 2020 resulting from illegal construction-induced overloading.
- Collapse of Juxian Restaurant
