= Shengze =

Town in Suzhou, China

Coordinates: 30.9080°N 120.6658°E

Shengze (Chinese: 盛泽) is a town in Wujiang District, Suzhou, Jiangsu Province, China. It is famous for its textile industry.
