= Sport climbing at the 2018 Asian Games – Women's speed =

Women's speed at the 2018 Asian Games
- Venue: Jakabaring Sport City
- Date: 23 August 2018
- Competitors: 20 from 11 nations

Medalists
gold medal	Aries Susanti Rahayu	Indonesia
silver medal	Puji Lestari	Indonesia
bronze medal	He Cuilian	China

The women's competition speed climbing event at the 2018 Asian Games took place on 23 August 2018 at Jakabaring Sport City, Palembang, Indonesia.

== Schedule ==
All times are Western Indonesia Time (UTC+07:00)

Date	Time	Event
Thursday, 23 August 2018	10:00	Qualification
Thursday, 23 August 2018	18:00	Round of 16
Thursday, 23 August 2018	18:00	Quarterfinals
Thursday, 23 August 2018	18:00	Semifinals
Thursday, 23 August 2018	18:00	Finals

== Results ==
Legend

- DNS — Did not start
- FS — False start

=== Qualification ===
Rank	Athlete	Lane A	Lane B	Best
1	Aries Susanti Rahayu (INA)	8.038	7.840	7.840
2	Puji Lestari (INA)	8.302	8.190	8.190
3	He Cuilian (CHN)	8.314	8.607	8.314
4	Song Yiling (CHN)	8.528	9.165	8.528
5	Assel Marlenova (KAZ)	9.102	9.403	9.102
6	Kobra Lakzaeifar (IRI)	9.321	11.314	9.321
7	Lee Hung-ying (TPE)	9.938	9.545	9.545
8	Sa Sol (KOR)	10.055	9.777	9.777
9	Azam Karami (IRI)	10.112	10.084	10.084
10	Futaba Ito (JPN)	10.113	11.019	10.110
11	Alexandra Zhiznevskaya (KAZ)	10.290	10.130	10.133
12	Park Seo-yeon (KOR)	10.700	10.475	10.475
13	Pratthana Raksachat (THA)	11.083	11.000	11.000
14	Nadhrah Yusri (SGP)	11.243	12.192	11.243
15	Amalina Syairah (MAS)	12.443	11.244	11.244
16	Narada Disyabut (THA)	11.413	Fall	11.413
17	Akiyo Noguchi (JPN)	12.935	11.488	11.488
18	Aina Azrin Zulkifli (MAS)	11.988	Fall	11.988
19	Shreya Sanjay Nankar (IND)	16.285	14.588	14.588
20	Nadirah Azmie (SGP)	DNS	DNS	DNS

=== Knockout round ===
Round of 16
1	Aries Susanti Rahayu (INA)	8.198
16	Narada Disyabut (THA)	12.750
8	Sa Sol (KOR)	9.690
9	Azam Karami (IRI)	10.924
4	Song Yiling (CHN)	10.889
13	Pratthana Raksachat (THA)	11.702
5	Assel Marlenova (KAZ)	9.236
12	Park Seo-yeon (KOR)	10.470
2	Puji Lestari (INA)	8.885
15	Amalina Syairah (MAS)	11.390
7	Lee Hung-ying (TPE)	9.347
10	Futaba Ito (JPN)	10.366
3	He Cuilian (CHN)	8.828
14	Nadhrah Yusri (SGP)	11.184
6	Kobra Lakzaeifar (IRI)	9.473
11	Alexandra Zhiznevskaya (KAZ)	11.010

Quarterfinals
1	Aries Susanti Rahayu (INA)	8.090
8	Sa Sol (KOR)	9.428
4	Song Yiling (CHN)	8.591
5	Assel Marlenova (KAZ)	8.910
2	Puji Lestari (INA)	—
7	Lee Hung-ying (TPE)	FS
3	He Cuilian (CHN)	8.380
6	Kobra Lakzaeifar (IRI)	11.604

Semifinals
1	Aries Susanti Rahayu (INA)	7.682
4	Song Yiling (CHN)	7.809
2	Puji Lestari (INA)	7.844
3	He Cuilian (CHN)	7.942

Final
1	Aries Susanti Rahayu (INA)	7.612
2	Puji Lestari (INA)	7.980
Small final
4	Song Yiling (CHN)	8.200
3	He Cuilian (CHN)	7.971
