= Sport climbing at the 2018 Asian Games – Women's speed relay =

Women's speed relay at the 2018 Asian Games
- Venue: Jakabaring Sport City
- Date: 27 August 2018
- Competitors: 44 from 8 nations

Medalists
gold medal	Indonesia; Fitriyani, Puji Lestari, Aries Susanti Rahayu, Rajiah Sallsabillah
silver medal	China; Deng Lijuan, Niu Di, Pan Xuhua
bronze medal	China; He Cuilian, Ni Mingwei, Qiu Haimei, Song Yiling

The women's competition speed climbing relay event at the 2018 Asian Games took place on 27 August at Jakabaring Sport City, Palembang, Indonesia.

== Schedule ==
All times are Western Indonesia Time (UTC+07:00)

Date	Time	Event
Monday, 27 August 2018	17:00	Qualification
Monday, 27 August 2018	19:00	Quarterfinals
Monday, 27 August 2018	19:00	Semifinals
Monday, 27 August 2018	19:00	Finals

== Results ==
Legend

- FS — False start

=== Qualification ===
Rank	Team	Time
1	Indonesia 1 (INA); Fitriyani; Puji Lestari; Aries Susanti Rahayu; Rajiah Sallsabillah	25.016
2	China 1 (CHN); He Cuilian; Ni Mingwei; Qiu Haimei; Song Yiling	26.234
3	China 2 (CHN); Deng Lijuan; Niu Di; Pan Xuhua	28.004
4	Indonesia 2 (INA); Nurul Iqamah; Mudji Mulyani; Agustina Sari; Santy Wellyanti	28.734
5	Iran 1 (IRI); Azam Karami; Kobra Lakzaeifar; Hadis Nazari	32.850
6	South Korea 2 (KOR); Choi Na-woo; Ko Jeong-ran; Son Sung-a	33.891
7	Thailand 1 (THA); Narada Disyabut; Pankaew Plypoolsup; Pratthana Raksachat; Puntarika Tunyavanich	36.158
8	Kazakhstan 2 (KAZ); Alina Matevossyan; Anastassiya Postoyenko; Mariya Chistova	39.094
9	Malaysia 1 (MAS); Siti Nursarah Salehhodin; Amalina Syairah; Tan Jie Yi; Aina Azrin Zulkifli	40.228
10	Singapore 1 (SGP); Stefanie Ann Low; Vanessa Teng; Nadhrah Yusri	41.421
11	Thailand 2 (THA); Boonwanit Artaui; Jiraporn Kaitwatcharachai; Sudarat Phoomsawat	54.315
12	South Korea 1 (KOR); Cha You-jin; Park Seo-yeon; Sa Sol	Fall
12	Kazakhstan 1 (KAZ); Margarita Agambayeva; Assel Marlenova; Alexandra Zhiznevskaya	FS

=== Knockout round ===
Quarterfinals
1	Indonesia 1	27.162
8	Kazakhstan 2	FS
4	Indonesia 2	FS
5	Iran 1	32.216
2	China 1	29.652
7	Thailand 1	Fall
3	China 2	29.281
6	South Korea 2	33.605

Semifinals
1	Indonesia 1	26.157
5	Iran 1	31.709
2	China 1	Fall
3	China 2	32.245

Final
1	Indonesia 1	25.452
3	China 2	FS
Small final
5	Iran 1	31.259
2	China 1	27.860
