= Kseniia Petrova =

Russian scientist detained in US

- Citizenship: Russian
- Education: Moscow Institute of Physics and Technology
- Occupation: Biomedical researcher
- Employer: Harvard Medical School
- Known for: Detention by ICE

Kseniia Petrova (Russian: Ксения Петрова) is a Russian biomedical researcher who was detained by the United States Immigration and Customs Enforcement after her travel visa was revoked when returning to the US from a holiday in France in February 2025.

Upon her return to the US, she imported frog embryo samples with her under request from her work at Harvard Medical School; these samples were legal to import, but she had incorrectly filled in the customs declaration form; instead of the usual punishment for this error of up to a $500 fine, her J-1 visa was revoked by an official at Logan International Airport. After stating she was afraid of political persecution if she were to be deported to Russia, she was taken to a detention facility in Vermont and then to Richwood Correctional Center in Monroe, Louisiana. Her colleagues campaigned for her release in the US, noting her rare skill in both genome biology and computing which had allowed her to help their investigation of the renewal of cells to mitigate the damage of aging.

After four months in detention, on June 12, 2025, Kseniia was freed on bail. The criminal charges against her were dropped and the case closed in November 2026.

== Early life and education ==
Petrova was raised by two engineers, her mother being a specialist in radio communications and her father a computer programmer. Family friend Vladimir Mazin has said she would carry her laptop with her to breakfast and dinner during vacations in the countryside so she could continue training neural networks. As a teenager, she supported and later joined the 2011–2013 Russian protests, opposing Putin's return to the presidency. In 2021, Petrova graduated from the Moscow Institute of Physics and Technology (MIPT).

== Career ==
=== 2021–23: Rosneft project in Moscow and anti-war protest ===
Petrova was quickly recruited by prominent Rutgers University molecular biologist Dr Konstantin Severinov after graduation for a genome-sequencing project in Moscow. This project was backed with $250 million in funding from Russian state-owned oil company Rosneft, and involved building a database structure and writing code. Due to the requirement of security clearance which would have involved Petrova promising to stop supporting Russia's political opposition, Severinov hired her as an outside consultant rather than a member of the team itself, describing her as "a principled person who just would not bow". When asked about this in her interview for the job, she said that "I think in each country, scientists are opposed to autocratic government."

She called for the impeachment of Russian president Vladimir Putin in the first few days of the Russian invasion of Ukraine, joining protests against the invasion in Moscow. She was arrested for this on March 2, 2022, and was charged with an administrative violation, fined about $200 and released. Seeing that the news sources she relied on for objective information "closed immediately" and fearing the Russian border would also close, she fled the country two days later.

=== 2023–25: Harvard Kirschner Lab research ===
Petrova initially fled to Georgia, and was offered a job in a lab in Britain, but was looking for another kind of science.

She was recruited to work on genomes in May 2023, at Harvard Medical School's Department of Systems Biology in its Kirschner Lab. This lab studies the earliest stages of cell division, observed in the eggs of the Xenopus frog, and investigates how cells renew themselves with the goal of mitigating the damage of aging. She was taken onboard by her manager and mentor Dr Leon Peshkin; he has since described her as "spectacular, the best I've ever seen in 20 years at Harvard," and "extremely ascetic". He has additionally said that the Kirschner Lab "requires a unique set of skills because you have to both be able to work as an embryologist and do applied math, modeling, data analysis and bioinformatics — all in one package," and that the person able to execute all of these tasks was "only her." Her work included developing computer scripts to analyze 100,000 images captured by a laser-based Raman microscope, a unique microscope which operates in the lab. She became friends and later housemates with postdoctoral fellow Dr William Trim, after writing a script allowing him to record his examination of the migration of lipids through tissue "in seconds," rather than two hours per day by hand. Trim has said she was spending 14-to-15-hour days at work.

Petrova went on vacation to Paris in February 2025, planning to see András Schiff in concert as well as to go to the theater and see her friends from Moscow. At the time, she was 30 years old and had a J-1 visa, allowing her to work in the US and travel abroad freely. She had not protested against Donald Trump or in support of Palestinians under siege in Gaza.

== Detention ==
For her return trip, Peshkin asked her to pick up a box of frog embryo samples from colleagues in France to be brought back to the lab in Harvard. These samples—high-quality superfine sections of the embryos—were not available at Harvard, and had thawed when their French colleagues had tried to mail them there.

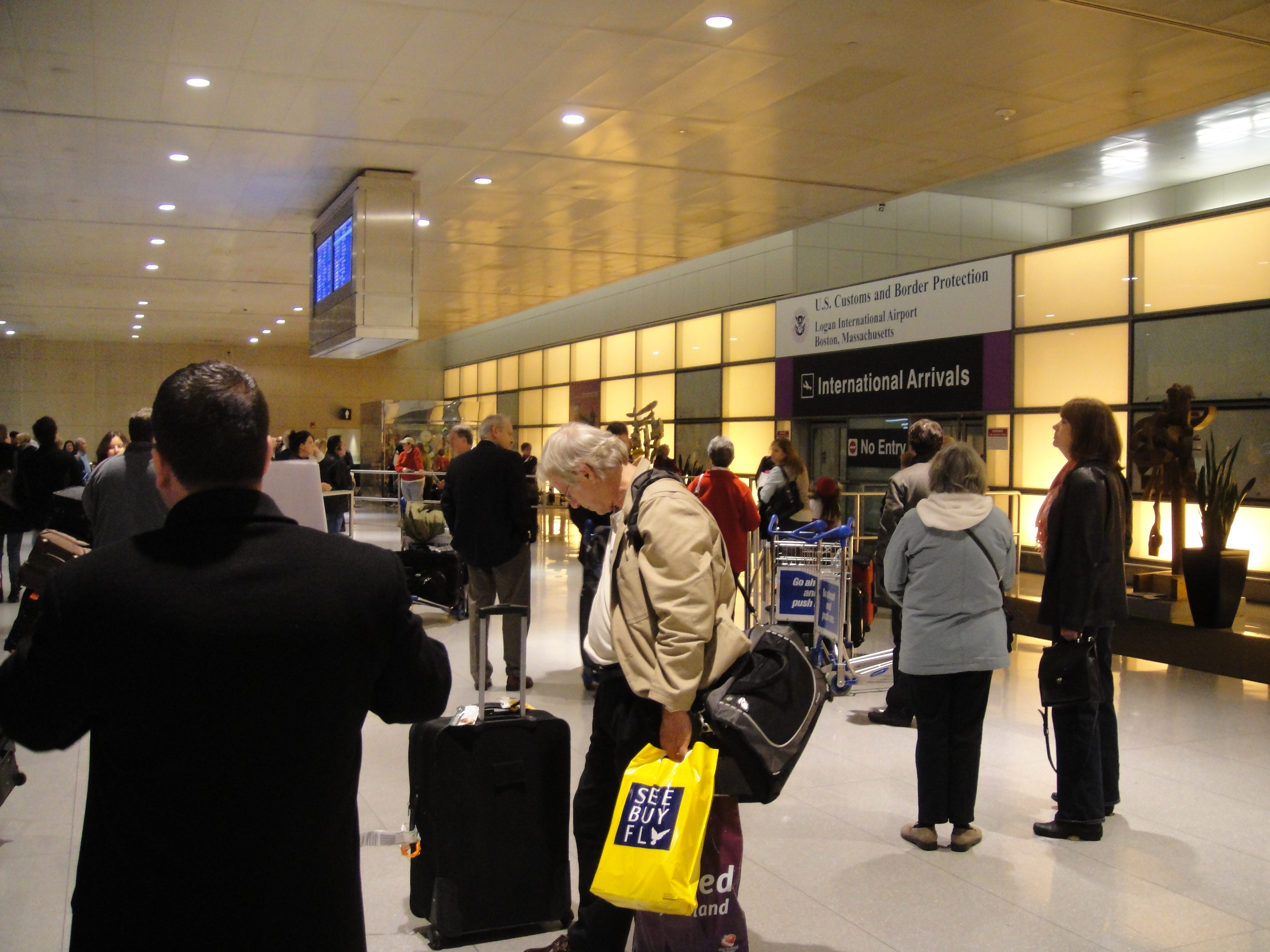
International arrivals at Logan International Airport in Boston, the terminal where Petrova was detained

On the evening of February 16, 2025, Petrova arrived from France at Logan International Airport in Boston, and her passport was stamped, admitting her into the United States. As she walked toward the baggage claim she was approached by a Border Patrol officer who asked to search her suitcase. She told them about the frog samples, aware that the RNA in them would degrade easily, and was told by this officer that she would be allowed to leave. Another officer then entered the room they were in and asked detailed questions concerning the samples, her work history and her travel in Europe. While her import of the frog embryos was legal, she had made a mistake on the US customs declaration form. The legal penalty for this form of error was usually a fine of up to $500, typically reduced to $50 for a first-time violation. However, the officers instead told her that they would revoke her visa, making her an undocumented immigrant, and that she was to be deported to Russia. When asked whether she was afraid to be deported to Russia, she said "yes, I am scared to go back to Russia, I am afraid the Russian Federation will kill me for protesting against them." Petrova was thus transferred to Immigration and Customs Enforcement (ICE) and sent to a detention facility in Vermont to wait for an asylum hearing.

Petrova was later moved to another facility, Richwood Correctional Center in Monroe, Louisiana, which features a space rented by ICE. There, she has been kept in a room with over 80 other female detainees. The cold dormitory features rows of bunk beds with thin blankets, and the women are allowed outside once per day, with breakfast at varying times as early as 3:30 am. Upon detention, she was not initially able to send messages or make calls, and had no access to a lawyer. Customs and Border Protection called Peshkin to notify him of her detention but did not disclose her whereabouts. On February 17, a spokesperson for the Department of Homeland Security said that a canine inspection had found petri dishes and vials of embryonic stem cells in Petrova's luggage without the correct permits, and that she was thus "lawfully detained after lying to federal officers about carrying biological substances into the country". They said that "messages on her phone revealed she planned to smuggle the materials through customs without declaring them. She knowingly broke the law and took deliberate steps to evade it." Trim sent her biology books upon request so she could study while imprisoned, as her laptop was confiscated. As of April 2025 she is studying meiosis while imprisoned.

On May 14, 2025, prosecutors charged Petrova with one count of smuggling goods into the United States.

== Release and proceedings ==
After a hearing before a federal judge in Boston, Petrova was released on bail on June 12, 2025. A probable cause hearing was held on June 19, during which the veracity of her statements and the scope of the cited law were debated. On June 25, 2025, a federal grand jury indicted Petrova on charges of making false statements to customs officials. Her manager, Leon Peshkin, in the meanwhile left Harvard, but she was rehired at the same lab she worked before her detention.

In April 2026, Judge Christina Reiss ruled that the CBP's actions had been "arbitrary and capricious", and that they had not had the authority to cancel Petrova's visa.

In early November 2026, the prosecution dropped all criminal charges against Petrova. Following this, Judge Leo Sorokin closed the case.

== Responses ==
Her coworker Cora Anderson shared the news of her detention on Facebook on 26 March, and set up a GoFundMe campaign for her application for a new visa despite her inability to work while doing so. Lawyer Gregory Romanovsky took on her asylum case, asking for Petrova's parole twice and being denied this both times by ICE, which has stated that she is a flight risk and a threat to US security. Harvard University commented little on her detention, though stated it was "engaged with Ms. Petrova's attorney on this matter." Marina Sakharov-Liberman, granddaughter of the Soviet physicist and dissident Andrei Sakharov, called it "extraordinary" that Harvard had not more publicly protested her detention. In a later interview, Petrova said that Harvad paid to her lawyer, which she otherwise would not be able to afford. Petrova's colleagues expressed worry that they may not see her again if she were deported to Russia, with many of her colleagues who were on temporary visas being reluctant to sign letters of support due to a risk to themselves. Prominent figures in Russia's political opposition have warned against delivering Petrova to Russia, whereas other young, educated Russians who fled the country after its invasion of Ukraine are watching the case as an example.

Petrova's attorney Romanovsky has said that Customs and Border Protection had overreached its authority by canceling her visa, which required them to identify grounds for excluding her, stating that "there are many, many grounds of inadmissibility, but violating a customs rule is certainly not one of them". This has been echoed by Stanford Law School professor Lucas Guttentag, who has said that "the government itself created the alleged improper immigration status that is now the basis for her detention."
