= Songling, Suzhou =

Coordinates: 31.0196°N 120.5348°E

Songling Town (simplified Chinese: 松陵镇; traditional Chinese: 松陵鎮; pinyin: Sōnglíng Zhèn) was built from 618 AD to 626 AD, the oldest town in Wujiang District, Suzhou, Jiangsu. Wujiang District People's Government is now located in it, and it is the political and cultural center of Wujiang District.

Urban area is now 34.35 square kilometers, planning area is more than 100 square kilometers. The administrative area is 148.58 square kilometers, with the jurisdiction of eight community committees, 46 administrative villages, and it has a total population of 12.04 million people.

Songling is located in the north of Wujiang. It has an area of 208.02 square kilometers and a population of 226,026 (in 2007). It has the jurisdiction of 10 communities, 22 administrative villages. It also has Sujiahang, Highway 227, Highway 230, Beijing-Hangzhou Grand Canal parallel north-south across. It is 90 kilometers away from Shanghai Hongqiao International Airport, and 40 kilometers from Sunan Shuofang International Airport.

== History ==
On 12 July 2021, an annex to the Siji Kaiyuan Hotel collapsed due to illegal construction, killing 17 people and injuring another five.
