= Sport climbing at the 2018 Asian Games – Men's speed =

Men's speed at the 2018 Asian Games
- Venue: Jakabaring Sport City
- Date: 23 August 2018
- Competitors: 27 from 14 nations

Medalists
gold medal	Reza Alipour	Iran
silver medal	Zhong Qixin	China
bronze medal	Aspar Jaelolo	Indonesia

The men's competition speed climbing event at the 2018 Asian Games took place on 23 August 2018 at Jakabaring Sport City, Palembang, Indonesia.

== Schedule ==
All times are Western Indonesia Time (UTC+07:00)

Date	Time	Event
Thursday, 23 August 2018	09:45	Qualification
Thursday, 23 August 2018	18:00	Round of 16
Thursday, 23 August 2018	18:00	Quarterfinals
Thursday, 23 August 2018	18:00	Semifinals
Thursday, 23 August 2018	18:00	Finals

== Results ==
Legend

- FS — False start

=== Qualification ===
Rank	Athlete	Lane A	Lane B	Best
1	Zhong Qixin (CHN)	6.044	5.822	5.822
2	Reza Alipour (IRI)	5.835	6.041	5.835
3	Sabri (INA)	6.143	5.941	5.941
4	Aspar Jaelolo (INA)	6.067	7.374	6.067
5	Lee Seung-beom (KOR)	6.182	6.391	6.182
6	Amir Maimuratov (KAZ)	6.200	6.431	6.200
7	Mehdi Alipour (IRI)	6.466	6.391	6.391
8	Lee Yong-su (KOR)	7.407	6.473	6.473
9	Li Jinxin (CHN)	6.744	9.231	6.744
10	Emmanuel Ryan Paul (SGP)	8.972	7.000	7.000
11	Phanuphong Bunprakop (THA)	7.781	7.144	7.144
12	Tomoa Narasaki (JPN)	Fall	7.260	7.260
13	Roman Kostyukov (KAZ)	7.471	7.271	7.271
14	Au Chi Fung (HKG)	7.679	7.327	7.327
15	Amar Hassan Kamal (SGP)	7.425	Fall	7.425
16	Chingkheinganba Maibam (IND)	7.534	7.634	7.534
17	Taqiuddin Zulkifli (MAS)	7.857	7.744	7.744
18	Thatthana Raksachat (THA)	9.966	7.760	7.760
19	Gerald Verosil (PHI)	7.959	10.663	7.959
20	Shoji Chan (HKG)	8.475	8.114	8.114
21	Bharath Pereira (IND)	8.368	8.717	8.368
22	Ghalib Azimi (MAS)	8.942	9.000	8.942
23	Kokoro Fujii (JPN)	11.456	9.557	9.557
24	Sajid Aslam (PAK)	10.010	12.418	10.010
25	Mushahid Hussain (PAK)	13.666	11.613	11.613
26	Pemba Sherpa (NEP)	12.000	13.228	12.000
27	Pranil Man Shrestha (NEP)	14.259	12.269	12.269

=== Knockout round ===
Round of 16
1	Zhong Qixin (CHN)	6.484
16	Chingkheinganba Maibam (IND)	7.199
8	Lee Yong-su (KOR)	6.629
9	Li Jinxin (CHN)	8.228
4	Aspar Jaelolo (INA)	5.962
13	Roman Kostyukov (KAZ)	6.548
5	Lee Seung-beom (KOR)	6.512
12	Tomoa Narasaki (JPN)	6.830
2	Reza Alipour (IRI)	6.426
15	Amar Hassan Kamal (SGP)	8.505
7	Mehdi Alipour (IRI)	7.940
10	Emmanuel Ryan Paul (SGP)	Fall
3	Sabri (INA)	6.224
14	Au Chi Fung (HKG)	7.188
6	Amir Maimuratov (KAZ)	—
11	Phanuphong Bunprakop (THA)	FS

Quarterfinals
1	Zhong Qixin (CHN)	5.975
8	Lee Yong-su (KOR)	6.246
4	Aspar Jaelolo (INA)	5.794
5	Lee Seung-beom (KOR)	6.118
2	Reza Alipour (IRI)	5.805
7	Mehdi Alipour (IRI)	6.688
3	Sabri (INA)	6.083
6	Amir Maimuratov (KAZ)	Fall

Semifinals
1	Zhong Qixin (CHN)	5.641
4	Aspar Jaelolo (INA)	5.651
2	Reza Alipour (IRI)	5.633
3	Sabri (INA)	Fall

Final
1	Zhong Qixin (CHN)	FS
2	Reza Alipour (IRI)	6.390
Small final
4	Aspar Jaelolo (INA)	—
3	Sabri (INA)	FS
