= Hengshan Station =

Hengshan Station may refer to the following stations:

- Hengshan metro station, a station on the Taoyuan Airport MRT
- Hengshan railway station, a station on the TRA Neiwan line
- Hengshan station (Suzhou Metro), a station on Line 3 of the Suzhou Metro
