= Vladislav Deulin =

Russian speed climber

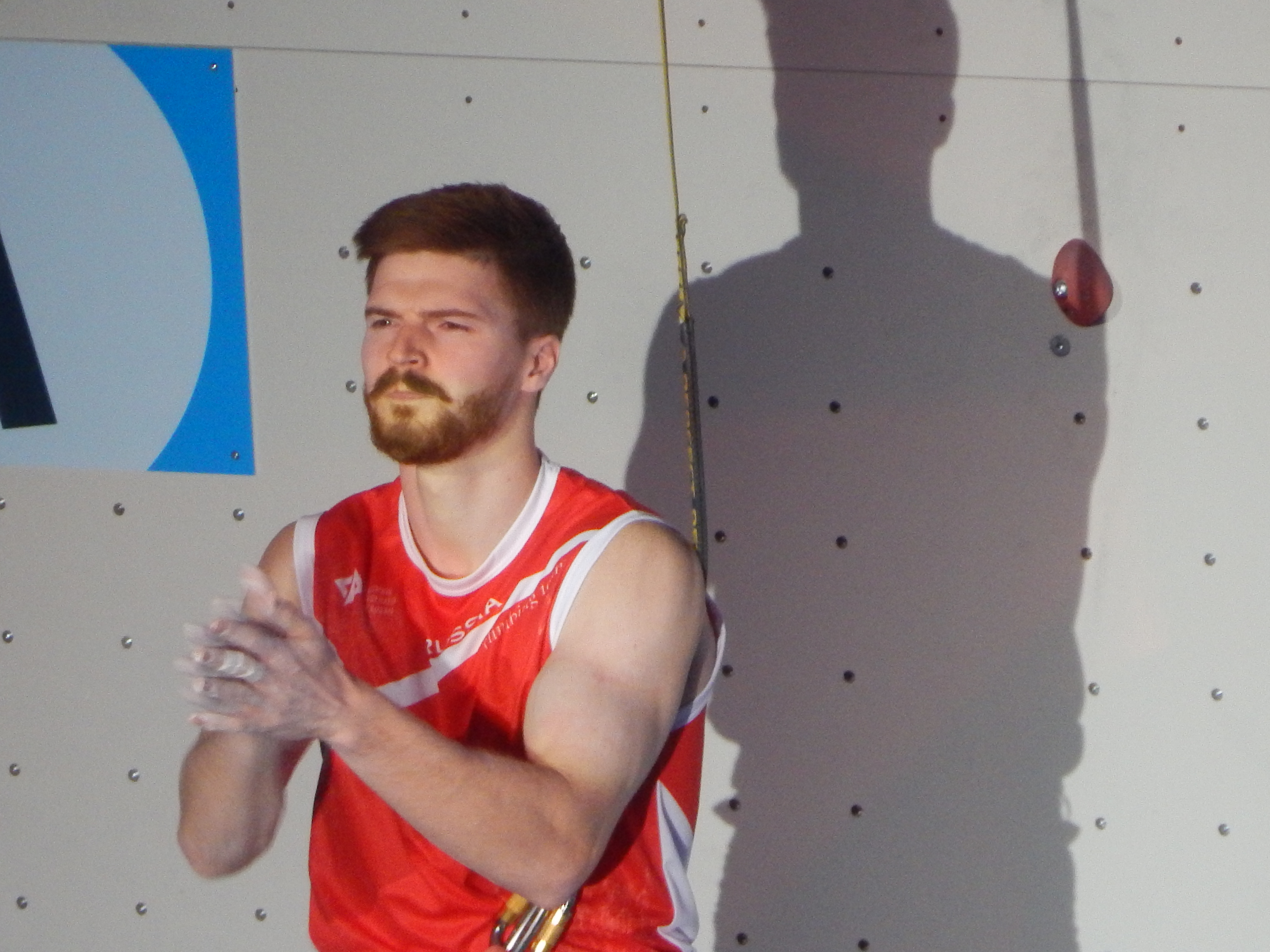
- Deulin in 2020

Personal information
- Nationality: Russian
- Born: 5 May 1994 (age 32)

Climbing career
- Type of climber: Competition speed climbing
Medal record
Men's competition climbing
Representing Russia
Event	1st	2nd	3rd
World Cup	3	3	4
World Championship	–	–	–
World Cup
Winner	2017	Speed
Second place	2019	Speed
European Championships
Gold medal – first place	2019 Edinburgh	Speed

Vladislav Aleksandrovich Deulin (Russian: Владислав Александрович Деулин; born 5 May 1994) is a Russian competition climber. He is the current world leader in the IFSC competition speed climbing discipline.

== Rankings ==
=== Climbing World Cup ===
Discipline	2017	2019	2020
Speed	1	2	1

=== Climbing World Championships ===
Adult

Discipline	2018	2019
Speed	5	9

=== Climbing European Championships ===
Adult

Discipline	2019	2020
Speed	1	4

== Number of medals in the Climbing World Cup ==
=== Speed ===
Season	Gold	Silver	Bronze	Total
2016	–	1	–	1
2017	3	–	2	5
2018	–	1	–	1
2019	–	1	2	3
2020	–	–	–	–
Total	3	3	4	10

== See also ==
- List of grade milestones in rock climbing
- History of rock climbing
- Rankings of most career IFSC gold medals
