= Song Yiling =

Chinese speed climber

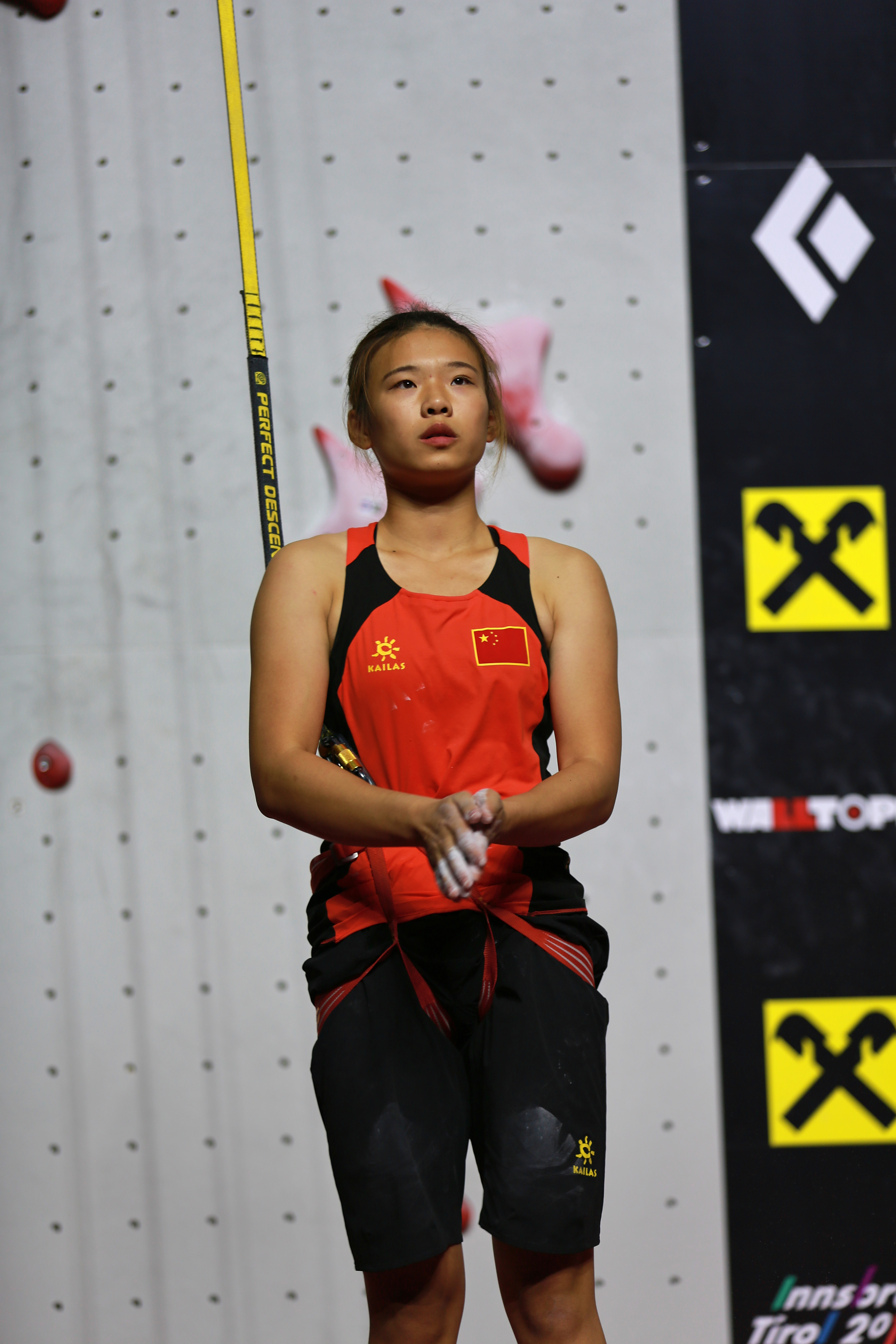
- Song Yiling at the 2018 IFSC Climbing World Championships

Personal information
- Nationality: Chinese
- Born: 28 January 2001 (age 25)
- Occupation: Professional climber
- Height: 1.64 m (5 ft 5 in)

Climbing career
- Type of climber: Competition speed climbing

Song Yiling (born 28 January 2001) is a Chinese competition climber who specializes in competition speed climbing. She finished second in the speed climbing event at the 2017 and 2018 Asian Climbing Championships. She qualified for the combined event at the 2020 Summer Olympics, where she finished 12th out of 20 competitors.
