= Wujiang, Suzhou =

Wujiang 吴江区 Wukiang
- District
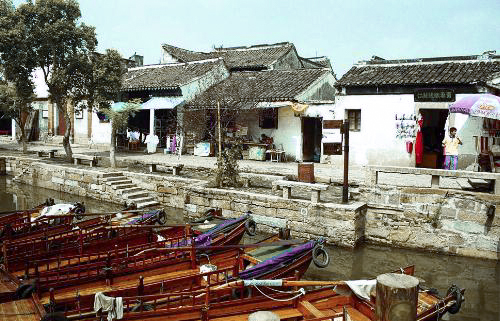
- Tongli

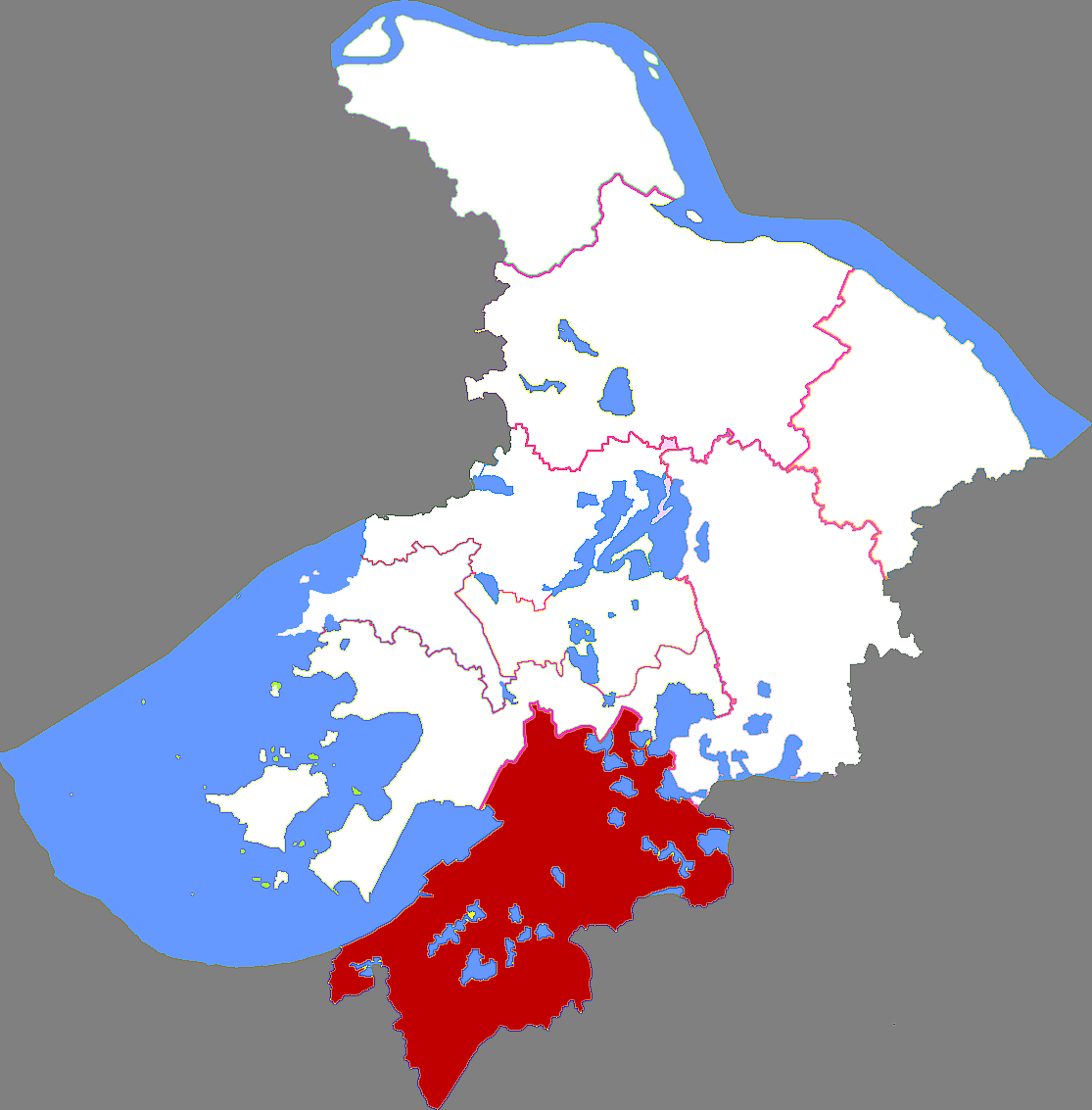
- Wujiang in Suzhou

- Suzhou in Jiangsu
- Coordinates: 31°08′19″N 120°38′43″E
- Country: People's Republic of China
- Province: Jiangsu
- Prefecture-level city: Suzhou

Area
  - District: 1,176.68 km^{2} (454.32 sq mi)

Population (2020 census)
  - District: 1,545,023
  - Density: 1,084/km^{2} (2,810/sq mi)
  - Urban: 1,161,152
  - Rural: 383,871
- Time zone: UTC+8 (China Standard)
- Postal code: 215200
- Area code: 0512
- Vehicle registration plates: 苏E
- Website: zgwj.gov.cn

Wujiang District (simplified Chinese: 吴江区; traditional Chinese: 吳江區; pinyin: Wújiāng Qū; Suzhounese, Wugniu: Ghou^{2} kaon^{1} chiu^{1}, Wu Chinese pronunciation: [ɦəu kɑ̃ tɕʰyⱼ]), formerly Wujiang City, is one of the five urban districts in Suzhou, Jiangsu, China. As the southernmost county-level division of Jiangsu, it borders Shanghai to the northeast and Zhejiang province to the south and southwest. The total area of Wujiang is 1,176.68 square kilometres (454.32 sq mi), with a population of 1.5 million. Wujiang is currently one of the most economically successful cities in China. Songling (松陵), a town located at the centre of Wujiang, serves as the seat of the district government.

== Geography ==
A portion of Lake Tai, numerous historical canals, and Historic Lili village are all located in Wujiang district. The government has announced that Wujiang will be designated as Taihu New City.

== Administrative divisions ==
In the present, Wujiang District has 1 subdistrict and 8 towns.

Subdistrict

- Binhu (滨湖街道)

Town

- Lili (黎里镇)
- Qidu (七都镇)
- Shengze (盛泽镇)
- Pingwang (平望镇)
- Songling (松陵镇)
- Taoyuan (桃源镇)
- Tongli (同里镇)
- Zhenze (震泽镇)

== Economy ==
Wujiang currently ranks as one of the most economically successful cities in China. Its GDP in 2007 was 61.8 billion yuan, an increase of 24.4% from 2006. The GDP per capita reached 78,149 yuan (ca. US$10,700) in 2007, an increase of 21.6% from the previous year. The city is home to more than 1,300 foreign enterprises with a total registered investment of US$10 billion.

== Sports ==
The 15,000-capacity Wujiang Stadium is located in the Wujiang District. It is used mostly for association football.

== Twin towns – sister cities ==
Wujiang has eight sister cities:

- Bourgoin-Jallieu, France
- Chiba, Japan
- Dubbo, Australia
- Hwaseong, South Korea
- Marlboro, United States
- Mogale, South Africa
- Südwestpfalz, Germany
- Uchinada, Japan

== See also ==
- Tongli
