= La Rambla (climb) =

Sport climbing route in Spain

- La Rambla Extension, La Rambla Direct, La Rambla Original.
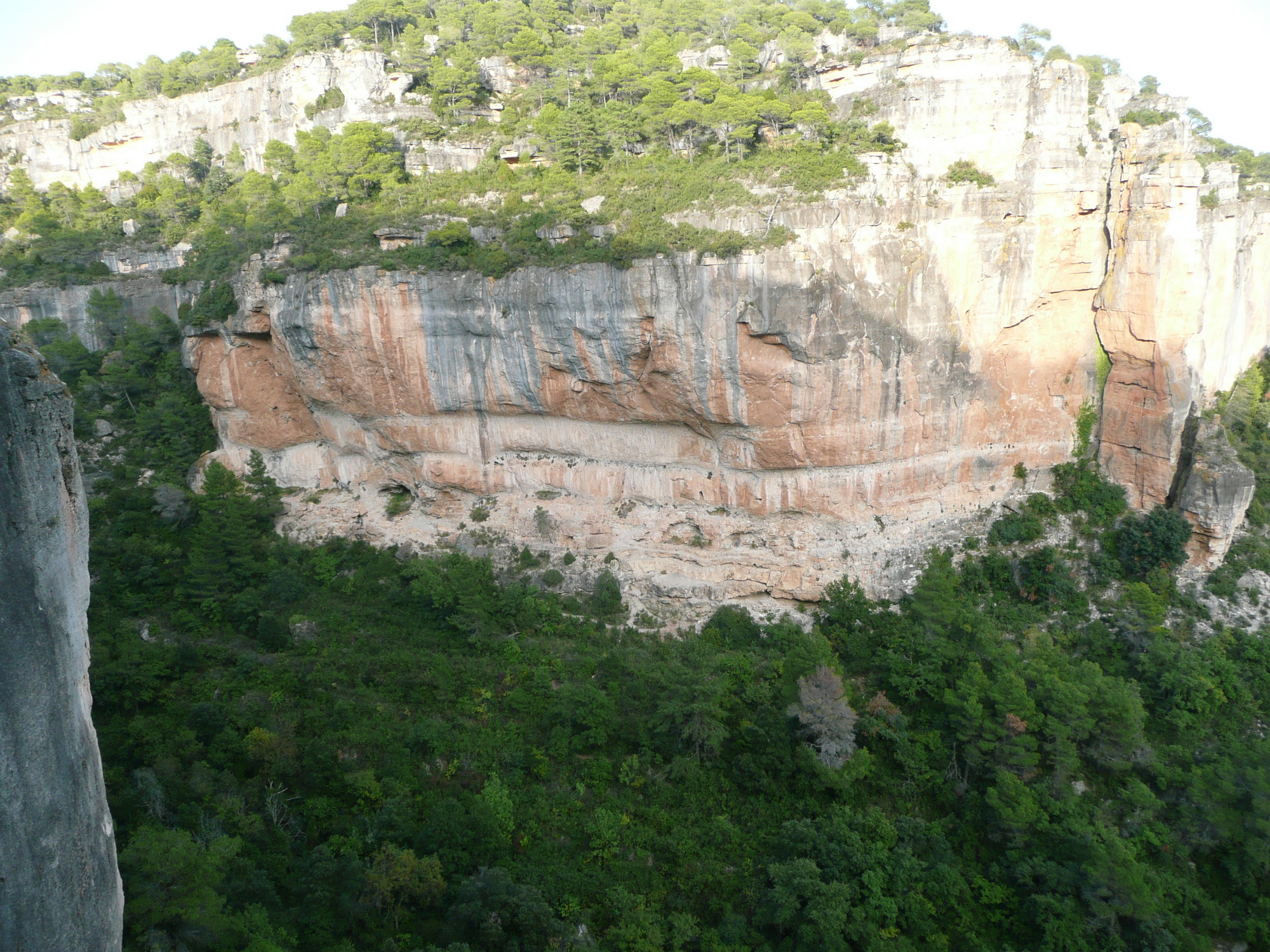
- La Rambla (at far left), on the El Pati crag (with its distinctive horizontal lines), Siurana, Spain

- Location within Spain
- Location: Siurana, Spain
- Coordinates: 41°15′29″N 0°55′56″E
- Climbing area: El Pati
- Route type: Sport climbing; Face climbing
- Rock type: Limestone
- Vertical gain: 35 metres (115 ft) (1994); 41 metres (135 ft) (2003)
- Pitches: 1
- Technical grade: 9a+ (5.15a)
- Bolted by: Alexander Huber (35-metres); Dani Andrada (6-metres)
- First free ascent: Alexander Huber, 1994 (35-metre); Ramón Puigblanque, 8 March 2003 (41-metres)
- First female free ascent: Margo Hayes, 26 February 2017
- Known for: Second-ever consensus 9a+ (5.15a) in history; First-ever female ascent at 9a+ (5.15a) in history; Part of the "9a+ trilogy" with Realization and Papichulo

La Rambla is a 41-metre (135 ft) sport climb at the limestone El Pati crag in Siurana, Catalonia, in Spain. Originally bolted and climbed by Alexander Huber in 1994 as a 35-metre (115 ft) route, the bolting was later extended by Dani Andrada to a 41-metre (135 ft) route, which was eventually climbed by Ramón Julián Puigblanque in 2003. While there has been debate about La Rambla's grade, there is now consensus that it meets the 9a+ (5.15a) threshold. It is an important and historic route in climbing, and is part of the coveted "9a+ trilogy" with Realization and Papichulo.

== History ==
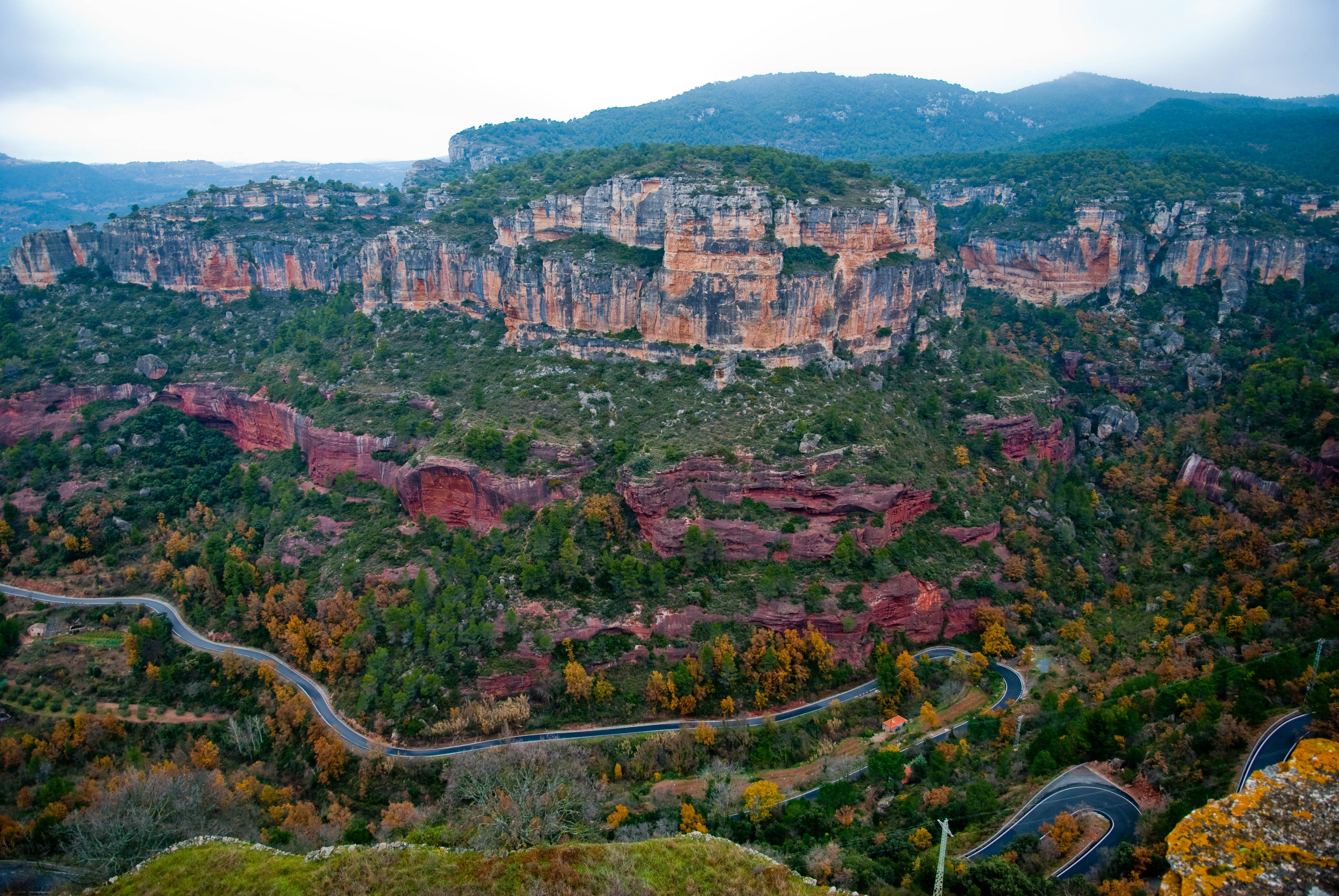
The El Pati crag (from the road) is the distinctive cliff with deep horizontal lines at back right.

While a 41-metre (135 ft) route was first bolted by Huber in 1993, a hold broke at the upper section and Huber was only able to climb to an intermediate anchor at 35-metre (115 ft), and not to his final anchor that was also the final anchor for Huber's neighboring route, La Reina Mora 8c+/9a . Huber climbed his 35-metre (115 ft) route in 1994, and called it La Rambla, and graded it as 8c+ (5.14c). Huber explained in a 2008 interview that he felt his 35-metre route was no more difficult than Wolfgang Güllich's 1991 ascent of Action Directe that was then graded 8c+ (5.14c). Action Directe was later re-graded to 9a (5.14d), and is considered a "benchmark" for a "hard" 9a. Huber later said his 35-metre route should be graded 9a (5.14d).

After Huber's 1994 ascent, Spanish climber Dani Andrada linked Huber's 35-metre route to the final anchor of La Reina Mora – Huber's original intention – by bolting a short traverse to the right that started from the last hold of Huber's route, a 3-finger pocket just below the intermediate anchor. Andrada's extended route was still 41 metres (135 ft) long, and became known for a period as La Rambla Extension, or La Rambla Direct, and even La Rambla Original (as Andrada wanted to keep as much as possible Huber's original 41-metre route), however, as Huber's anchor at 35-metres is now gone, Andrada's 41-metre route is known as La Rambla.

Andrada himself was not able to free his new 41-metre bolted route. Instead, it was later freed on 8 March 2003 by Spanish climber Ramón Julián Puigblanque, who redpointed the 35-metre route five times, and only completed Andrada's 6-metre extension after forty failed attempts.

Puigblanque re-graded the entire route to 9a+ (5.15a), and believed that this grade applied not only to the 6-metre extension but also to the original 35-metre Huber route as well. If this was correct, then Huber's original 35-metre La Rambla was the first 9a+, seven years before Chris Sharma's 2001 ascent of Realization/Biographie. In a 2008 interview, Huber said that the 6-metre extension added little difficulty to his original route, and that his original 8c+ route would be graded 9a by contemporary standards, but no more, as ultimately it was not harder than Action Directe, the benchmark 9a route. A second grading debate developed over the use of a big flake (or jug) one metre further to the right of the extension's traverse for resting. Puigblanque said that he had not used this flake on his first ascent and that using the flake made the climb a half grade easier, to which Adam Ondra (who also did not use the flake on his 2008 ascent) agreed with, but caveated saying: "although it is nonsense to consider it [the flake] as prohibited".

It took three years until La Rambla was repeated by Edu Marín i Garcia and Chris Sharma, on successive days in 2006. La Rambla has since become one of the most repeated 9a+ (5.15a) routes in the sport, and is now widely considered a consensus 9a+ (5.15a). In March 2013, German climber Alexander Megos came closest to flashing La Rambla, falling on his first attempt near the top, but succeeding on his immediate second attempt. On 26 February 2017, American climber Margo Hayes became the first-ever female climber in history to climb a 9a+ (5.15a) route on La Rambla; Hayes also went on to make the first female free ascent of Realization/Biography a few months later in September 2017.

== Route ==
La Rambla is described as having a diverse range of "cracks, pockets, crimps, side pulls, and underclings", but is also "sustained", and "continually overhanging". Several climbers have described it as being two climbs, the first circa 30-metres being essentially 5.14 climbing, via a 5.13c crack, a traverse to the left, which adds up to 5.14a, and then 5.14b as it moves right until a rest. At this stage, the climber is approaching the location of Huber's original anchor (since removed), and the climbing becomes even more overhanging "with violent moves on small holds and crimps".

The crux is at 35-metres where, as Ramón Julián Puigblanqué describes, "You have to make the two-finger pocket. If you get the pocket with your right hand you can clip Huber's intermediate belay and you've done [the 35-metre] La Rambla. If you are going for La Rambla Direct [the 41-metre version], you have to take the pocket with your left hand – this is the key move. I made it to this point four or five times". Ondra graded this crux a V9 (7C) boulder move.

== Legacy ==
La Rambla is variously described as legendary, historic, and famous in the climbing media, and even two decades on from the various first ascents, repeat ascents of the route are reported on and chronicled by the climbing media. The sustained difficulty and length of the climb made it an important technical and physical test piece for the leading sport climbers, and it has become one of the most repeated routes, alongside Realization/Biographie, at the climbing grade of 9a+ (5.15a). PlanetMountain said in 2017, "Seeped in history, La Rambla is a symbol for sport climbing, one of the world's most sought-after climbs", and listed La Rambla on its list of important climbs in the evolution of free climbing. When French climber Sébastien Bouin made the 20th ascent in December 2017, he said, "This route is a piece of climbing history".

La Rambla has also been reassessed as part of German climber Alexander Huber's sport climbing legacy, and it has become apparent to contemporary extreme sport climbers that Huber was climbing consistently at the grade of 9a/9a+ in the early to mid-1990s, as evidenced by La Rambla and his other test-pieces of Open Air in 1996 (proposed for re-grading by Adam Ondra to 9a+ in 2008, and therefore potentially the first 9a+ as it was climbed before Realization/Biographie), and Weisse Rose in 1994 (also proposed for re-grading by Adam Ondra to at least a "hard 9a").

The ascent of La Rambla at Siurana, Realization/Biographie at Céüse, and Papichulo at Oliana, have been referred to as the "9a+ trilogy", being long, sustained, and consensus graded 9a+ sport climbing routes, that aspiring extreme sport climbers seek to test themselves on.

== Ascents ==
La Rambla (being the 41m version post-1994) has been ascended by:

- 1st (35m version) Alexander Huber in 1994
- 1st (41m version) Ramón Julián on 8 March 2003
- 2nd. Edu Marín in December 2006
- 3rd. Chris Sharma in December 2006
- 4th. Andreas Bindhammer in 2007
- 5th. Patxi Usobiaga in 2007
- 6th. Adam Ondra in February 2008
- 7th. Enzo Oddo in 2011
- 8th. Sachi Amma in 2012
- 9th. Felix Neumärker in 2013
- 10th. Son Sang-won in 2013.
- 11th. Alex Megos in March 2013
- 12th. Daniel Jung in 2014
- 13th. Jonathan Siegrist in 2015
- 14th. David Firnenburg in February 2017
- 15th. Matty Hong in February 2017
- 16th & 1st Female Free Ascent. Margo Hayes in February 2017
  (first-ever female ascent at the grade of 9a+)
- 17th. Stefano Ghisolfi in March 2017
- 18th. Jacopo Larcher in March 2017
- 19th. Klemen Bečan in 2017
- 20th. Sébastien Bouin in December 2017
- 21st. Tomás Ravanal in 2018
- 22nd. Gerard Rull in 2018
- 23rd. Jon Cardwell in 2018
- 24th. Dave Graham in 2019
- 25th. Piotr Schab in 2019
- 26th. Gonzalo Larrocha in 2019
- 27th. Cédric Lachat in 2019
- 28th. Chaehyun Seo in November 2022
- 29th. Michaela Kiersch in January 2023
- 30th. Seb Berthe in January 2023
- 31st. Gabriele Moroni in February 2024
- 32nd. Taisei Homma in December 2024

== Filmography ==
- Margo Hayes' first female and 16th ascent: Hong, Matty and Mortimer, Peter (director) (2 November 2017). Break on Through (ReelRock 12) (Motion picture). Sender Films.

== See also ==
- History of rock climbing
- List of grade milestones in rock climbing
- Silence, first climb in the world with a potential grade of 9c (5.15d)
- La Dura Dura, second climb in the world with a confirmed grade of 9b+ (5.15c)
- Jumbo Love, first climb in the world with a confirmed grade of 9b (5.15b)
- Realization/Biographie, first climb in the world with a confirmed grade of 9a+ (5.15a); forms the coveted "9a+ Trilogy" with La Rambla and Papichulo
- Action Directe, first climb in the world with a confirmed grade of 9a (5.14d)
