= Jonathan Siegrist =

American rock climber

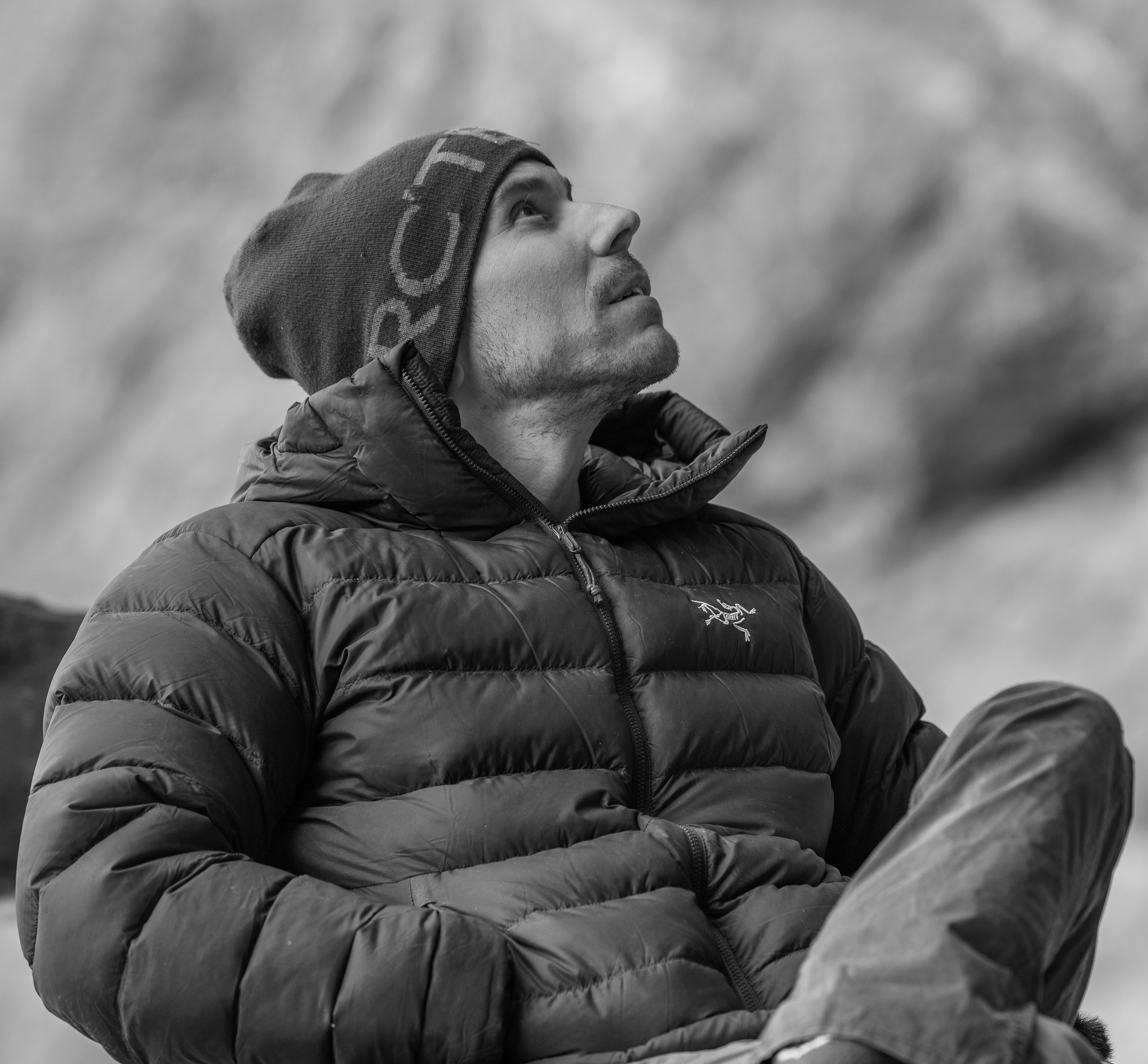
- Siegrist in Utah, 2021

Personal information
- Nickname: J-Star
- Born: August 27, 1985 (age 41) Madison, Wisconsin, U.S.
- Education: Naropa University (BSc.)
- Occupation: Professional rock climber
- Height: 167 cm (5 ft 6 in)
- Website: www.jonathansiegrist.com/p/about.html

Climbing career
- Type of climber: Sport climbing; Traditional climbing; Bouldering
- Highest grade: Redpoint: 5.15b (9b); Onsight/Flash: 5.14b (8c) (flash); Bouldering: V14 (8B+)
- First ascents: All You Can Eat (5.15a, 2019); One Hundred Proof (5.15a, 2020); Nu World (5.15a/b, 2020); Full Metal Brisket (5.15a, 2020); Close Encounters (5.15a, 2022); Event Horizon (5.15b, 2022)
- Known for: Prolific +5.15-grade sport climber.
- Updated on 18 July 2023

Jonathan Siegrist (born 27 August 1985) is an American rock climber who is regarded as one of the world's most prolific sport climbers, and who has redpointed, and made numerous first free ascents, of a large number of sport climbing routes at and above the grade of 9a (5.14d). Siegrist's breadth of experience at the world's most extreme sport climbing grades, means that he is often looked to for guidance regarding the grading of extreme sport routes in America. While principally known as a sport climber, he has repeated some of the world's hardest traditional climbing routes.

== Climbing career ==
Siegrist began climbing at an early age with his father Bob Siegrist, who was an established 5.13 rock climber, but only started climbing seriously in about 2004, then aged 18.

=== Sport climbing ===
In 2009, Siegrist came to national attention when Climbing Magazine awarded him the Golden Piton Award in the "Breakaway Success" category.

In 2014, aged 28, Siegrist climbed his first 9a+ (5.15a) graded route when he redpointed Chris Sharma's famous 2001 sport climbing route, Realization/Biographie. Over the following year, Siegrist became only the fifth person in history to complete the "9a+ Trilogy", (Note: Realization, La Rambla and Papichulo has become known as the "9a+ trilogy", as they are regarded as classic benchmark 9a+/5.15a test-pieces for extreme sport climbers. They were the first-ever three 9a+ routes that Siegrist climbed.) adding La Rambla, and Papichulo. In 2017, Siegrist cemented his status at the 9a+ grade, with ascents of Pachamama, Joe Mama and Chaxi, all completed in one six-week trip to the famous Oliana crag in Spain.

In May 2018, Siegrist came to wider attention with only the second repeat of Sharma's groundbreaking route, Jumbo Love, which was Siegrist's first route at the grade of 9b (5.15b). In 2019, he repeated a second notable 9b graded route making the third repeat of La Planta de Shiva in Spain, and making his own first free ascent (FFA) of a 9a+ (5.15a) route with All You Can Eat in the US. Over the next few years, Siegrist would create several other new 9a+ graded routes, and in 2022, he completed his first FA of a 9b (5.15b) route with Event Horizon, one of America's hardest sport climbing routes.

=== Traditional climbing ===
While Siegrist is known as a sport climber, he has repeated some of the world's hardest traditional climbs, including Sonnie Trotter's internationally famous 2007 route, The Path (5.14a R), and the even harder but less repeated route, The Almighty (5.14a/b R), by Ty Mack. In 2016, Siegrist made the first repeat of Tommy Caldwell's 2013 route, Direct Dunn-Westbay (5.14a/b), belayed by his 66-year-old father, Bob.

== Notable ascents ==
=== Redpointed sport routes ===
9b (5.15b):

- Stoking the Fire – Santa Linya (ESP) – April 2023. Fifth repeat of Chris Sharma's 2013 route.
- Event Horizon – 5G Wall, Las Vegas (US) – May 2022. First ascent; gives a direct finish to his 2020 5.15a/b route, Nu World.
- Lapsus – Andonno (ITA) – October 2021. Third repeat of Stefano Ghisolfi's 2015 route (and Italy's first-ever 9b); possible 9a+ now.
- Peruvian Necktie – Pop Tire Cave Utah (US) – May 2021. Second repeat of James Litz's 2013 route, which Siegrist upgraded to 9b.
- La Planta de Shiva – Villanueva del Rosario (ESP) – May 2019. Third repeat of Adam Ondra's 2011 route.
- Jumbo Love – Clark Mountain (US) – May 2018. Second repeat of Chris Sharma's groundbreaking 2008 route.

9a+ (5.15a):

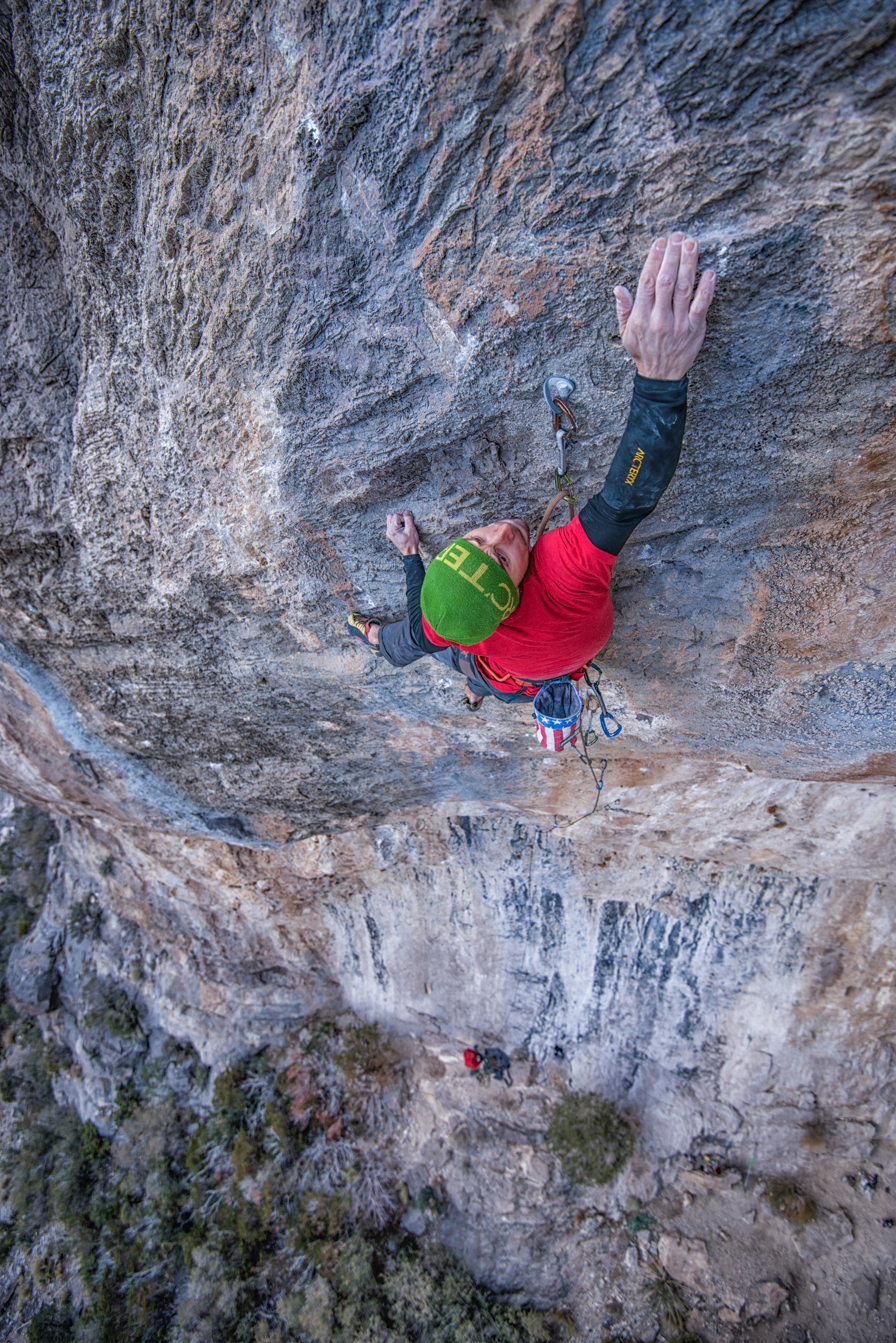
Siegrist on the FFA of Spectrum 5.14c (8c+), Red Rocks, Nevada

- Jungle Boogie – Ceuse (FRA) – July 2023. Repeat of Adam Ondra's 2012 route.
- Flex Luthor – Fortress of Solitude, Colorado (US) – November 2022. Third repeat of Tommy Caldwell's 2003 route, which Siegrist downgraded to 9a+, saying that it was much easier than the other 9b's he had done to date.
- Close Encounters – La Madre range, Nevada (US) – February 2022. First ascent.
- Kinder Cakes – Skull Cave, Rifle Mountain Park, Colorado (US) – August 2022. First repeat of Joe Kinder's 2021 route.
- Seleccion Anal – Santa Linya (ESP) – March 2022. Second repeat of Edu Marín i Garcia's 2016 route.
- Full Metal Brisket – New River Gorge, West Virginia, (US) – December 2020. First ascent.
- Nu World – 5G Wall, Las Vegas (US) – October 2020. First ascent, and felt by Siegrist to be closer to 9a+/b.
- One Hundred Proof – Clear Light Cave, Mt. Potosi, Las Vegas, (US) – February 2020. First ascent.
- All You Can Eat – Mt. Potosi, Las Vegas, (US) – March 2019. First ascent.
- Bone Tomahawk – Flynn Cave, St. George, Utah, (US) – March 2018. First repeat of Joe Kinder's 2016 route, which Siegrist graded as 9a+.
- Chaxi – Oliana (ESP) – April 2017. Repeat of Klemen Bečan's 2016 route.
- Joe Mama – Oliana (ESP) – April 2017. Repeat of Chris Sharma's 2009 route.
- Pachamama – Oliana (ESP) – April 2017. Repeat of Chris Sharma's 2009 route.
- Papichulo – Oliana (ESP) – November 2015. Repeat of Chris Sharma's 2008 route; Siegrist was the 5th person to do the "9a+ Trilogy".
- La Rambla – Siurana (ESP) – March 2015. Twelfth repeat of the famous route, and Siegrist's second 9a+.
- Realization/Biographie – Ceuse (FRA) – June 2014. Seventh repeat of Chris Sharma's famous 2001 route, and Siegrist's first 9a+.

=== Traditional climbing routes ===
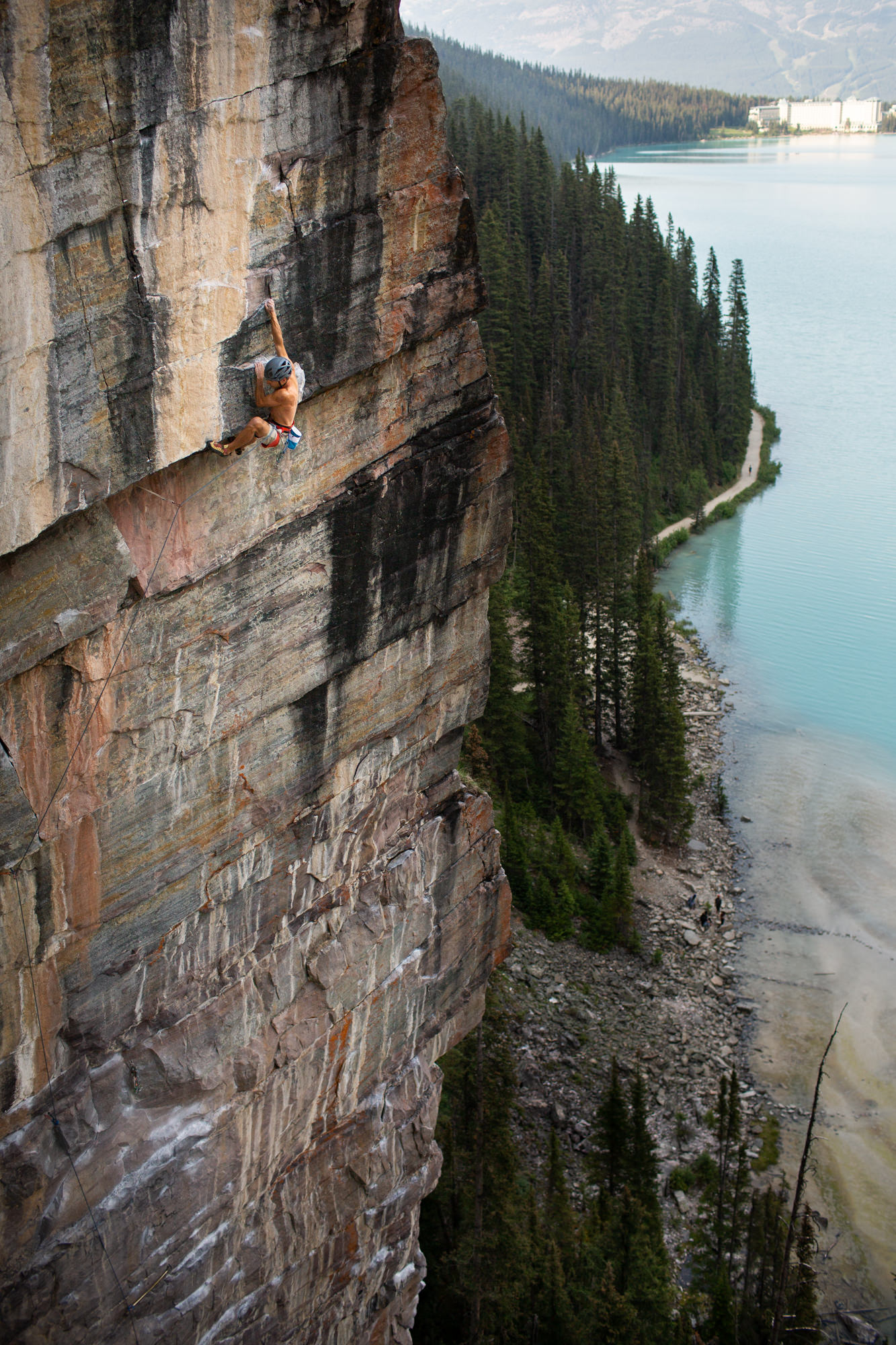
Siegrist on The Path 5.14a R

- 5.14a (8b+) R. The Path – Lake Louise (Canada) – August 2018. Repeat of Sonnie Trotter's famous 2007 route; at the time, it was one of the world's hardest traditional routes.
- 5.14a/b (8b+/c). Direct Dunn-Westbay – The Diamond, Colorado (US) – August 2016. First repeat of Tommy Caldwell's 2013 multi-pitch route; Siegrist was belayed on the route by his 66-year-old father, Bob Siegrist; also one of the world's hardest traditional climbs.
- 5.14a/b (8b+/c) R. The Almighty – Teyton Canyon, Wyoming (US) – July 2013. First repeat of Ty Mack's 2011 route; one of the world's hardest.
- 5.13d (8b) R. Enter the Dragon – The Fins, Lost River Range, Idaho (US) – September 2012. First ascent, and Siegrist's hardest traditional FFA.

=== Onsighted routes ===
8c (5.14b):

- Digital system – Santa Linya (ESP) – March 2022. Flash.

8b (5.13d):

- Radote jolie pépère – Ceuse (FRA) – July 2023. Onsight.

=== Boulder problems ===
- V14 (8B+). Jade – Rocky Mountain National Park, Colorado (US) – June 2015. Repeat of Daniel Woods' famous 2007 boulder.

== See also ==
- List of grade milestones in rock climbing
