= Duality of Man (climb) =

Sport climbing route in Arizona, U.S.

- Location within Arizona
- Coordinates: 31.780°N 110.342°W
- Climbing area: Dry Canyon, Arizona
- Route type: Sport climbing Overhang (roof) climbing
- Rock type: Limestone
- Vertical gain: 30 metres (98 ft)
- Pitches: 1
- Technical grade: 9c (5.15d) (proposed)
- Bolted by: Nathaniel Coleman (2018)
- First free ascent: Sean Bailey; March 6, 2025
- Known for: First proposed 5.15d (9c) in the United States

Duality of Man is a 30-metre (98 ft) sport climbing route on an overhanging limestone cliff in the Dry Canyon climbing area of the Whetstone Mountains in southern Arizona in the United States. The route was bolted by Nathaniel Coleman. When Sean Bailey made the first free ascent on 6 March 2025, it became the first sport climb in the United States, and fourth in the world, to have a proposed technical grade of 5.15d (9c). The route has been attempted by other climbers, notably Austrian professional sport climber Jakob Schubert, but has not yet been repeated.

== History ==
In 2018, American climber Nathaniel Coleman completed a first ascent of Lee Majors, an existing sport climb that follows the roof of a cave in the Dry Canyon climbing area in southern Arizona. Following the ascent, Coleman extended the line from the lip of the cave to the top of the headwall and made attempts to climb it the following year, but was ultimately unsuccessful.

Sean Bailey attempted the full route, originally named The Six Million Dollar Man, for 3 climbing seasons over four years before ultimately climbing it successfully and renaming it The Duality of Man. When interviewed about the climb, Bailey reported that "this was by far the longest I've spent on a climb...and the hardest climb I've ever completed". Bailey officially completed the climb on March 6, 2025 but waited more than 11 months to share it publicly.

== Route ==
Duality of Man is approximately 100-foot (30 m) long, ascending the inside of a limestone cave and subsequent headwall at a popular climbing area in Dry Canyon, Arizona. The first section of the route follows the original line of Lee Majors, a 5.14c sport route which contains an estimated V9 boulder problem and final dyno to reach the anchors (which are clipped from a dead hang).

The second section of the route is more difficult and ascends the 60-foot, slightly overhung headwall above the anchors of Lee Majors. Bailey describes the headwall consisting of an initial boulder problem in the grade range of V11-V12, followed by an uncomfortable two-hand rest, then followed by a second boulder problem in the range of V14-V15.

The route reportedly only experiences an hour or two of shade per day during the climbing season and the area has unpredictable weather which limits the amount of time climbers can spend attempting the route.

== Ascents ==
Sean Bailey remains the only person to have climbed Duality of Man. Following his ascent of Lee Majors, Nathaniel Coleman invested time in attempting the headwall above the route in 2019 but was ultimately unsuccessful. It was reported in April 2026 that Austrian climber Jakob Schubert attempted the route but failed to complete it.

== Filmography ==
Sean Bailey's attempts and ascent of the route were the subject of the short documentary Duality of Man. The film premiered on February 27, 2026, alongside three other climbing films at the Boulder Theatre in Boulder, Colorado, as part of the Mellow Film Tour.

== See Also ==
- History of rock climbing
- List of grade milestones in rock climbing
- Silence, first climb in the world with a potential grade of 9c (5.15d)
- Jumbo Love, first climb in the world to be graded 9b (5.15b)
- Realization/Biographie, first climb in the world with a consensus grade of 9a+ (5.15a)
- Action Directe, first climb in the world with a consensus grade of 9a (5.14d)
- Hubble, first climb in the world with a consensus grade of 8c+ (5.14c)
