= Jean-Christophe Lafaille =

French mountaineer and rock climber

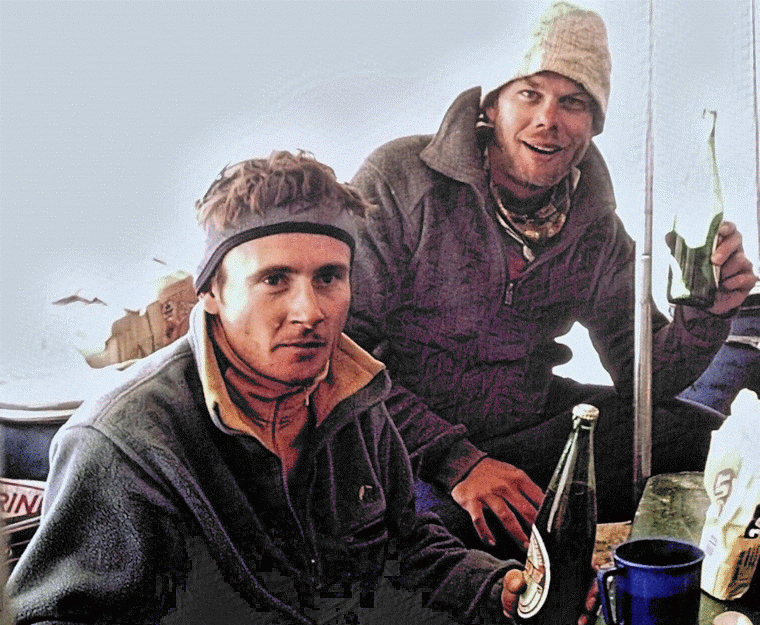
- Lafaille (left) at Shishapangma base camp

Personal information
- Born: March 31, 1965 Gap, Hautes-Alpes, France
- Disappeared: January 27, 2006; Makalu
- Occupations: Alpine guide, alpinist
- Height: 5 ft 3 in (160 cm)
- Spouse: Katia Lafaille (m. 1998)
- Children: 3

Climbing career
- Type of climber: Alpine climbing; Traditional climbing; Sport climbing; Himalayan climbing; Free solo climbing
- Highest grade: Free solo: 8a+ (5.13c)
- Known for: Ascending 11 of the 14 eight thousander; First-ever to free solo 8a+ (5.13c) in history; Many hard first free ascents in the Alps

Jean-Christophe Lafaille (31 March 1965 – 27 January 2006 [presumed]) was a French mountaineer, alpinist and rock climber who was noted for difficult first ascents and first solo winter ascents, in the Alps and in the Himalaya, as well as setting new milestones in free solo climbing. Considered one of the strongest alpinists of his generation, he is also remembered for what has been described as "perhaps the finest self-rescue ever performed in the Himalaya", when he was forced to descend the mile-high south face of Annapurna alone with a broken arm after his climbing partner had been killed in a fall. He climbed eleven of the fourteen eight-thousanders, many of them alone or by new climbing routes. He disappeared during a solo attempt to make the first winter ascent of Makalu, the world's fifth highest mountain.

== Early career ==
Born in Gap, Hautes-Alpes, Lafaille's background was in sport climbing, and as a teenager he climbed extensively at Céüse and played a part in turning it into one of the world's best known sport climbing venues, this included his 1989 bolting of Realization/Biographie, which would become of the most notable routes in rock climbing history when Chris Sharma ascented it in 2001. In 1987, he became the first-ever climber to free solo an 8a+ (5.13c) graded route in history with Rêve de gosse, and he redpointed routes up to grade 8c (5.14b).

In the early 1990s, Lafaille qualified as a mountain guide and began mountaineering and alpine climbing in the Alps. He made a number of difficult ascents on the Mont Blanc massif, including the first solo ascent of Divine Providence (900m, ED4, 7b+), on the Grand Pilier d'Angle, considered one of the hardest alpine climbing routes on the massif.

== Self-rescue on Annapurna ==
On the strength of his climbs in the Alps, Lafaille was invited on an expedition to Annapurna by Pierre Béghin, one of the leading French climbers of the day. The pair attempted the mountain's vast South Face following the monsoon season in October 1992 in Alpine style, with no Sherpa support, pre-stocked campsites or fixed ropes on the upper mountain. They had reached a height of 7,400 metres when bad weather forced them to descend. The pair made a series of abseils down the face, but due to their lightweight approach they had little protective equipment and were often forced to abseil from a single piece of protection to conserve equipment. On the fourth or fifth abseil, Béghin fell to his death when the single cam he was using as an anchor became dislodged from the rock. Béghin had been carrying most of the pair's technical equipment, including all the ropes, and Lafaille was left alone on the face, a vertical mile above safety.

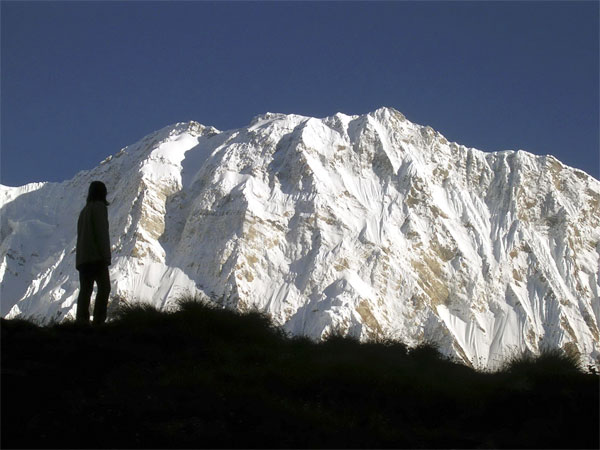
The South Face of Annapurna

With great difficulty, Lafaille managed to climb down the 75 degree face to the pair's last bivouac site, where he found 20 metres of thin rope, allowing him to make short abseils down some of the hardest parts. With no technical equipment to use as anchors he was forced to entrust his weight to tent pegs or, on one occasion, a plastic bottle. He finally reached what should have been the relative safety of the top of a fixed rope which he and Beghin had installed on a steep rock band, but almost immediately he was struck by a falling rock, which broke his right arm. Disabled and helpless, he lay on a ledge for two days in the hope that other climbers would rescue him. However, while there was a Slovenian team attempting a route on a different part of the South Face, they judged that a rescue attempt would be too dangerous to undertake, so help never came. The cruelest thing about the ordeal, Lafaille said, was being able to see life in the valley below, and by night, the flashbulbs of trekkers' cameras. In spite of this, he later agreed that the Slovenians had made the right decision in not trying to save him.

Eventually, with all hope of rescue gone, Lafaille resolved to continue down alone. He initially tried to continue abseiling, but unable to control the rope with only one hand and his teeth he reverted to downclimbing one-handed, and was utterly exhausted when he reached the Slovenian team's base camp. By that time the climbers at the base of the mountain had given up hope for him, and his first wife, Véronique, had already been told that he had died. Reinhold Messner later said that the survival instinct he showed was of the sort which defines the best mountaineers.

== Subsequent career ==
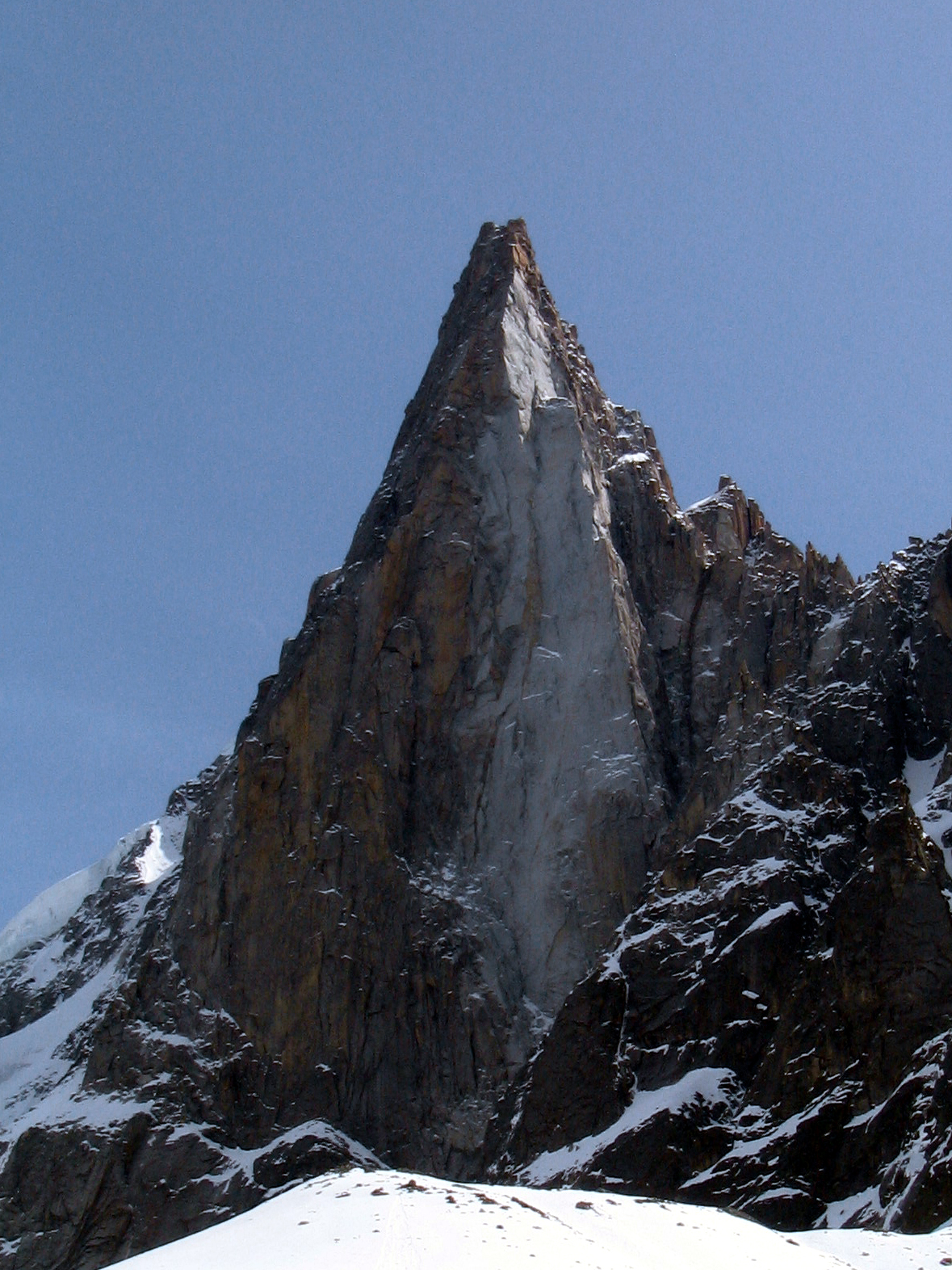
Les Drus, where Lafaille made his hardest Alpine climb

After Annapurna, Lafaille resolved never to climb again, but during his long physical and psychological recovery he began scrambling in the foothills of the Alps, and eventually returned to extreme climbing. In the Alps he carried out an enchainment of nine north faces in fifteen days, skiing from mountain to mountain, and made the first ascent of the Lafaille Route on the Petit Dru, which at the time was considered the hardest route in the Alps, but his most important climbs were in the Himalaya.

A year after his accident on Annapurna, he climbed Cho Oyu, and then in 1994 he climbed a new route, again solo, on the north face of Shishapangma. It was the first of many solo climbing ascents of eight-thousander peaks, including consecutive ascents of Gasherbrum I and Gasherbrum II in four days in 1996, and Manaslu in 2001.

Annapurna remained an obsession for Lafaille, and he would later call his autobiography Prisoner of Annapurna. He returned to the mountain three times. The first time he made a solo attempt on the British line on the South Face, which failed due to poor snow conditions. In 1998 he returned to the same route with a larger team, but the expedition was abandoned when a team member was killed in an avalanche. He finally reached the summit in 2002 with Alberto Iñurrategi via the long, committing east ridge.

By 2003, Lafaille had decided to try to climb all fourteen eight-thousanders; but unlike many of the mountaineers who take on this goal, he had no desire simply to climb them by well established routes, in large expeditions and with bottled oxygen. He preferred to continue trying to achieve new routes or solo ascents, or to climb in the more demanding winter season. In 2003, he climbed Nanga Parbat, Dhaulagiri (solo) and Broad Peak in a two-month period. The last of these nearly killed him when he fell into a crevasse and then developed high altitude pulmonary edema. He was rescued by Ed Viesturs and Denis Urubko.

When asked why Lafaille climbed solo, his wife Katia said he did not wish to see another climbing partner die.

In December 2004, he made a solo ascent of Shishapangma. It was intended to be the first winter ascent of the mountain, but he reached the summit on 11 December which was seen as too early to be classed as a true winter ascent. He had now completed eleven of the fourteen eight-thousanders, and needed Everest, Kanchenjunga and Makalu to complete his goal.

== Death on Makalu ==
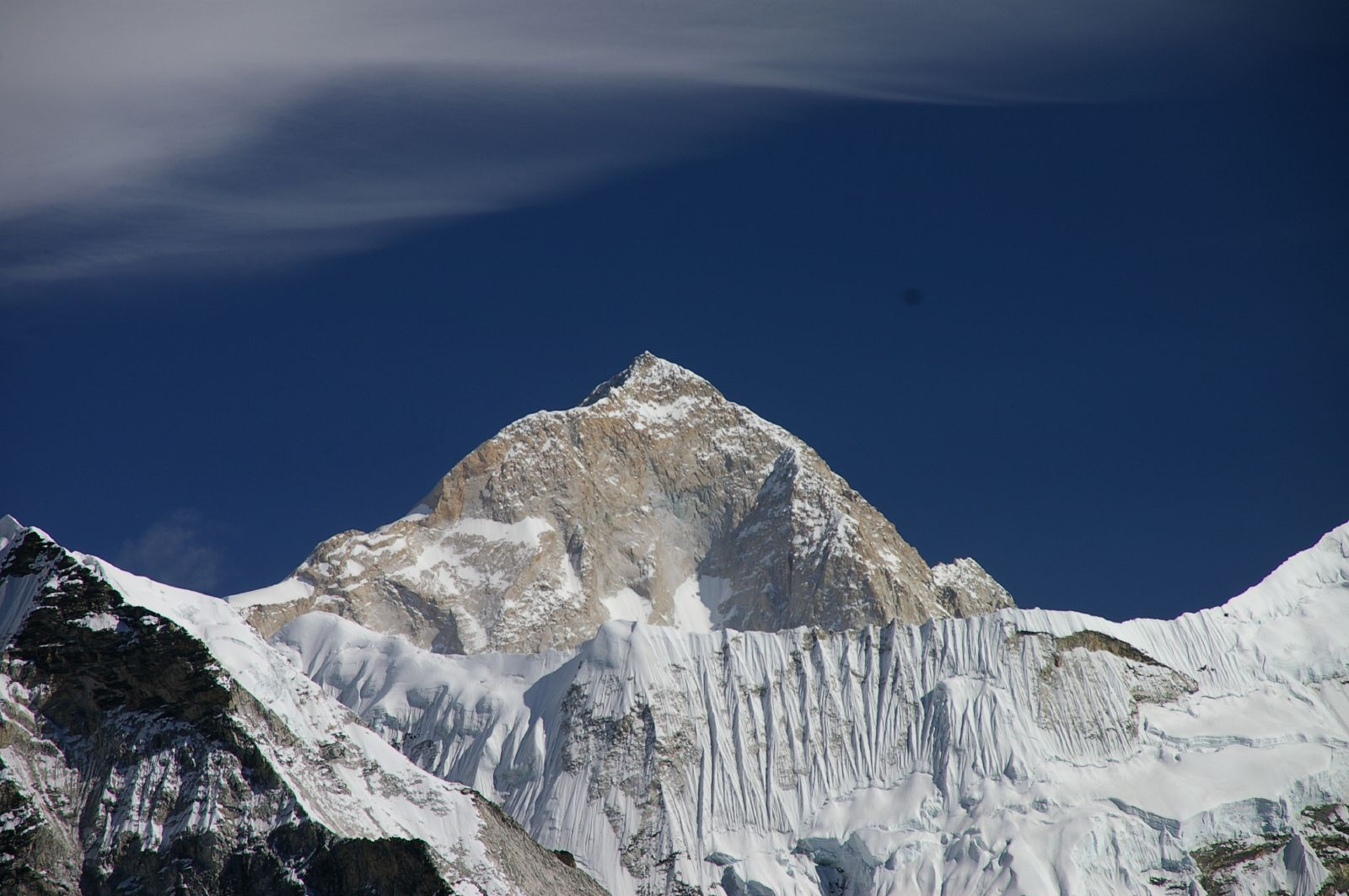
Makalu, scene of Jean-Christophe Lafaille's last climb

Lafaille's last climb was one of his boldest. In December 2005, he began a solo attempt to climb Makalu (8462m), the only 8000-metre peak in Nepal not to have seen a winter ascent. It was a goal which would have been considered suicidal a few years previously, but for Lafaille the danger was an important part of the experience. He commented

"I find it fascinating that our planet still has areas where no modern technology can save you, where you are reduced to your most basic - and essential - self. This natural space creates demanding situations that can lead to suffering and death, but also generate a wild interior richness. Ultimately, there is no way of reconciling these contradictions. All I can do it [sic] try to live within their margins, in the narrow boundary between joy and horror. Everything on this earth is a balancing act."

Over four weeks in December and January, he hauled loads up the mountain, entirely alone above his advance base camp at 5300m, but was forced to retreat from the col at Makalu La by strong winds, which destroyed his tent and twice blew him into the air. However, after two weeks at base camp the weather improved, and on 24 January he set off up the mountain. His only means of communication was a satellite phone, which he used to speak to his wife several times a day. By the morning of the 27th he was camped on a small ledge around 1000m below the summit, and told his wife that he would try to reach the top that day. He was never heard from again. Alone on the mountain in winter, with no climbers in the world sufficiently acclimatised to reach his high camp, there was no possibility of a rescue attempt. His base camp team gave up hope of him returning alive after he had been missing for a week, and a later helicopter flight over the mountain failed to find any sign of him. His body has not been found and his exact fate is unknown.

== Personal life ==
At the time of his death, he left his wife, Katia, and three children (two from previous marriage and one from Katia, as Ed Viesturs writes in No Short Cuts to the Top).

His son, Tom Lafaille has become an alpinist and ski mountaineer, and has returned to his father's routes in the Himalayas. In 2023, Tom Lafaille made the first successful French ski descent from Broad Peak.

== See also ==
- Catherine Destivelle, French alpinist and climber
