= Yosemite Decimal System =

American grading system for rock climbs

The Yosemite Decimal System (YDS) is a five-part grading system used for rating the difficulty of rock climbing routes in the United States and Canada. It was first devised by members of the Sierra Club in Southern California in the 1950s as a refinement of earlier systems from the 1930s, and quickly spread throughout North America.

== Description ==
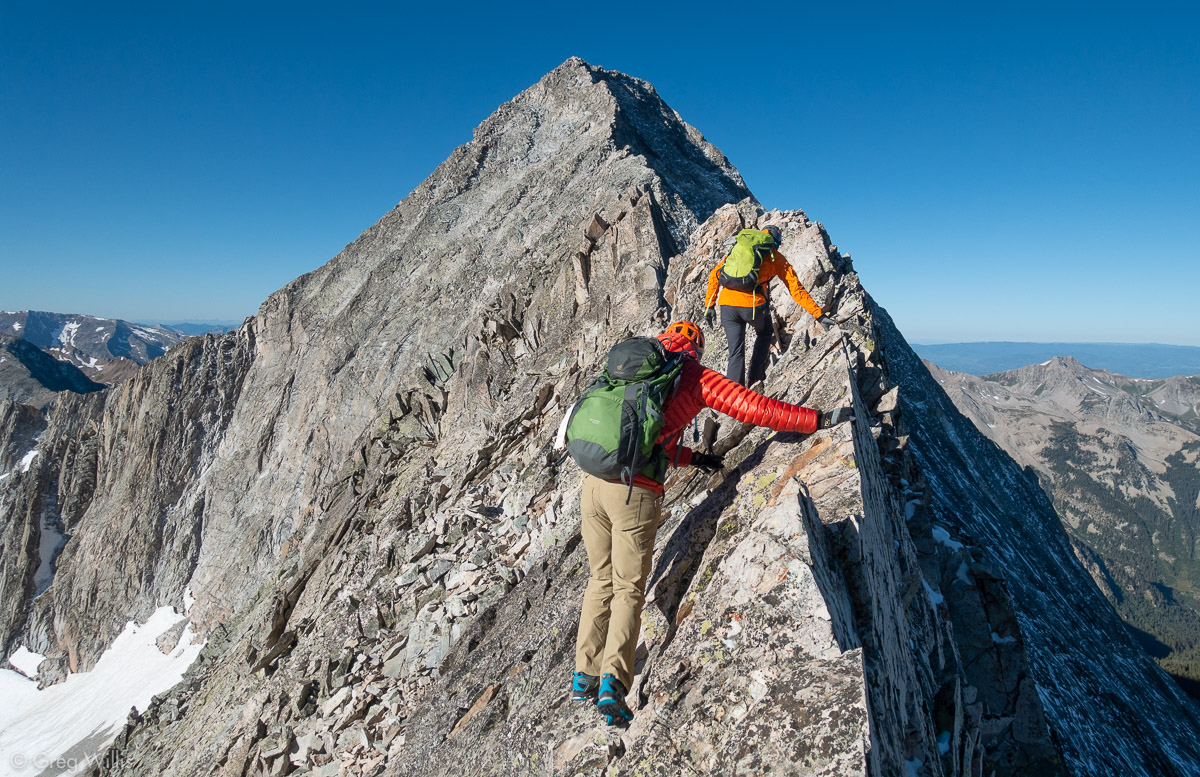
The Knife Edge on Capitol Peak in Colorado is an example of a Class 4 climb

The class 5 portion of the class scale is primarily a rock climbing classification system, while classes 1–4 are used for hiking and scrambling. The current definition for each class is:

Class 1
Hiking or running on a trail.
Class 2
Simple scrambling, with the possibility of occasional use of the hands.
Class 3
Scrambling. A rope could be carried.
Class 4
Simple climbing, possibly with exposure. A rope is often used. Falls could be fatal. Natural protection can easily be found.
Class 5
It is considered technical roped free climbing; belaying is used for safety. Un-roped falls can result in severe injury or death.

The American YDS system is the dominant system in North America, and it and the French numerical system are the most dominant systems worldwide; beyond the easiest grades, they can be exactly aligned. The exact definition of the classes is somewhat controversial, and updated versions of these classifications have been proposed.

Climbers use class "5" as a prefix, which is then followed by a period (originally a decimal point) and a number that starts at 1 and counts up with increasing difficulty (e.g. 5.4, 5.5, 5.6, etc.). At 5.10, the system adds the letters "a", "b", "c", and "d" as further refinements between levels, and the scale continues upward (e.g. 5.10a, 5.10b, 5.10c, 5.10d, 5.11a, 5.11b, etc.).

The American YDS system is an open-ended scale, with the current hardest climb being 5.15d, established by Silence in 2017. Like the French system, the numerical component of the American YDS system is focused on the hardest move on the route.

== Protection rating ==
In 1980, Jim Erickson introduced an additional rating for traditional climbing routes where the level and quality of the climbing protection are assessed. The letter codes chosen were, at the time, identical to the American system for rating the content of movies:

Code	Description
G	Good, solid protection.
PG	Adequate protection. Falls will not be long
R	Inadequate protection: potential for long fall, leader will likely suffer injuries
X	Protection is unavailable or so sparse that any fall is likely to result in death or serious injury.

== History ==
In 1936, the Sierra Club adapted a numerical system of classification. This system, without the decimals, was initially referred to as the "Sierra Club grading system." Class 1 was a hike, and higher classes were more difficult and technical, going up to class 6, which is referred to as aid climbing.

The fifth class began to be refined by climbers at Tahquitz Peak in Southern California in the 1950s. Royal Robbins, Don Wilson, and Chuck Wilts came up with a decimal subdivision of the fifth class consisting of 5.0, 5.1, and so on up through 5.9. This system was implemented in the early 1950s, with new routes and ratings at Tahquitz being described in mimeographed newsletters of the Rock Climbing Section of the Angeles Chapter of the Sierra Club. The system was originally referred to by names such as "Southern California" or "Wilts-Sierra system," but eventually came to be referred to as the Yosemite Decimal System, even though it was devised and standardized at Tahquitz, not Yosemite. The first systematic presentation was in the 1956 edition of Wilts's guidebook for Tahquitz. Mark Powell is said to have exported the system to Yosemite around the same time.

The standards for the fifth-class climbing grades as of 1979 were as follows:

Grade	Route	First free ascent
5.0	The trough	1936
5.1	White maiden's walkway	1937
5.2	Frightful variation of the trough	1944
5.3	East lark	1950
5.4	Angel's fright	1936
5.5	Ski tracks	1947, 1957
5.6	Sahara terror	1942
5.7	Fingertrip	1946
5.8	Mechanic's route	1937
5.9	Open book	1952

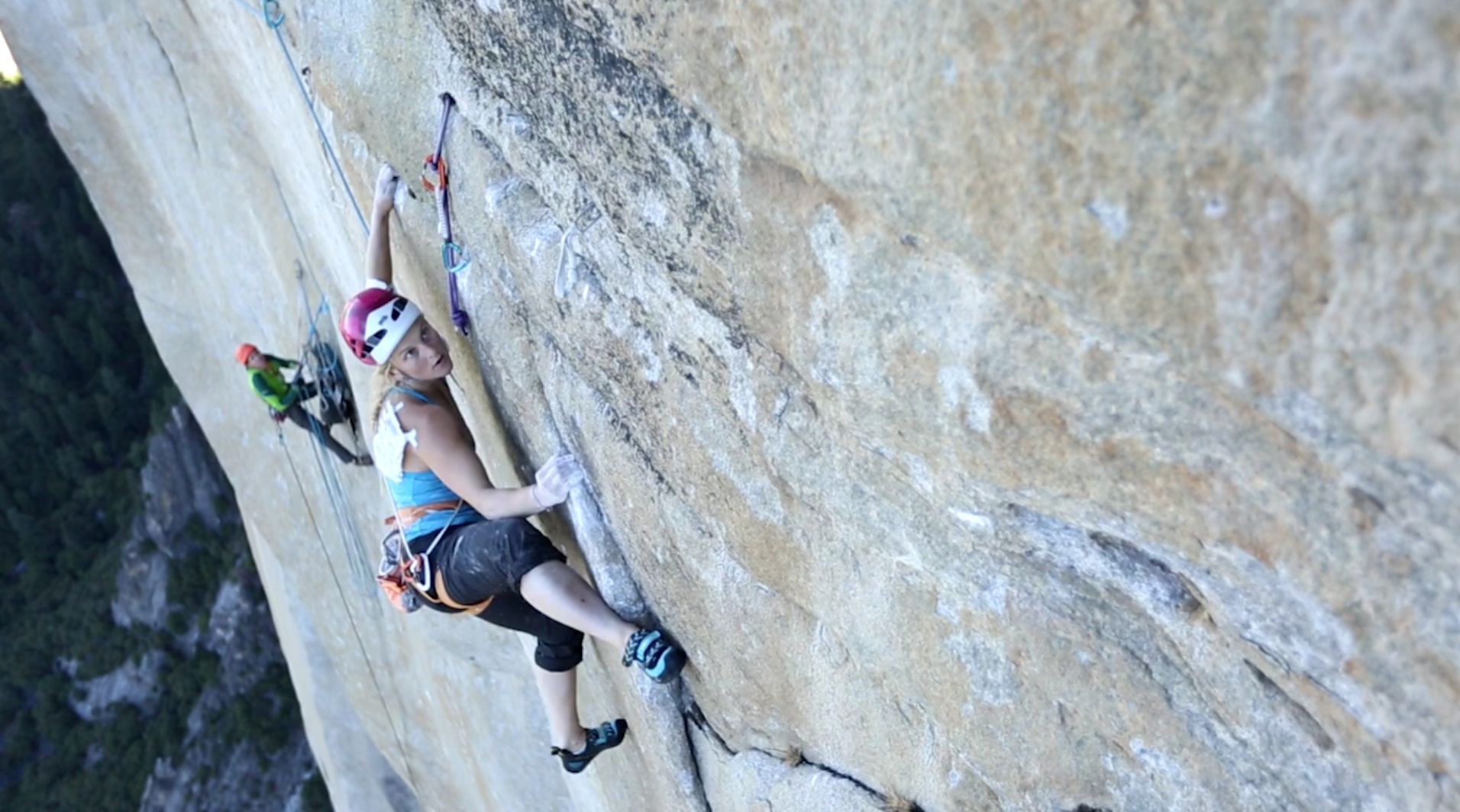
Emily Harrington on El Capitan in Yosemite, free climbing a 5.13a route

The original intention was that 5.9 would be the hardest possible free climb, with class 6 describing aid-climbing routes. Initially the scale was based on ten climbs at Tahquitz, and ranged from the "Trough" at 5.0, a relatively modest technical climb, to the "Open Book" at 5.9, considered at the time the most difficult unaided climb humanly possible. In later years, as gear and athletic standards in the sport became more advanced, many aid routes were "freed" (i.e., climbed without aid), and the class 6 label fell into disuse, so that 5.x could be a label for any technical rock climb, regardless of whether most people were doing it free or aided. By the 1960s and 70s, increased athletic standards and improved equipment meant that class 5.9 climbs from the 1950s became only of moderate difficulty for some, while new 5.9 climbs were much harder. Class 5.9 began to be subdivided as 5.9- and 5.9+. Eventually, climbers began adding classes of 5.10 and 5.11 (rendering the "Decimal" part of the Yosemite Decimal System name technically inaccurate). In the early 1970s, it was determined that the 5.11 climb was much harder than 5.10, leaving many climbs of varying difficulty bunched up at 5.10. To solve this, the scale has been further subdivided for 5.10 and above climbs with suffixes from "a" to "d". As of December 2025, only three climbs are considered to have a difficulty of 5.15d: Silence, first climbed by Adam Ondra on September 3rd, 2017; DNA, first climbed by Sébastien Bouin on April 26nd, 2022; and B.I.G., first climbed by Jakob Schubert, on September 20th, 2023. No climbs graded 5.15d have been repeated.

== See also ==
- Aid climbing
- Ice climbing
