= Redpoint (climbing) =

Type of free climbing

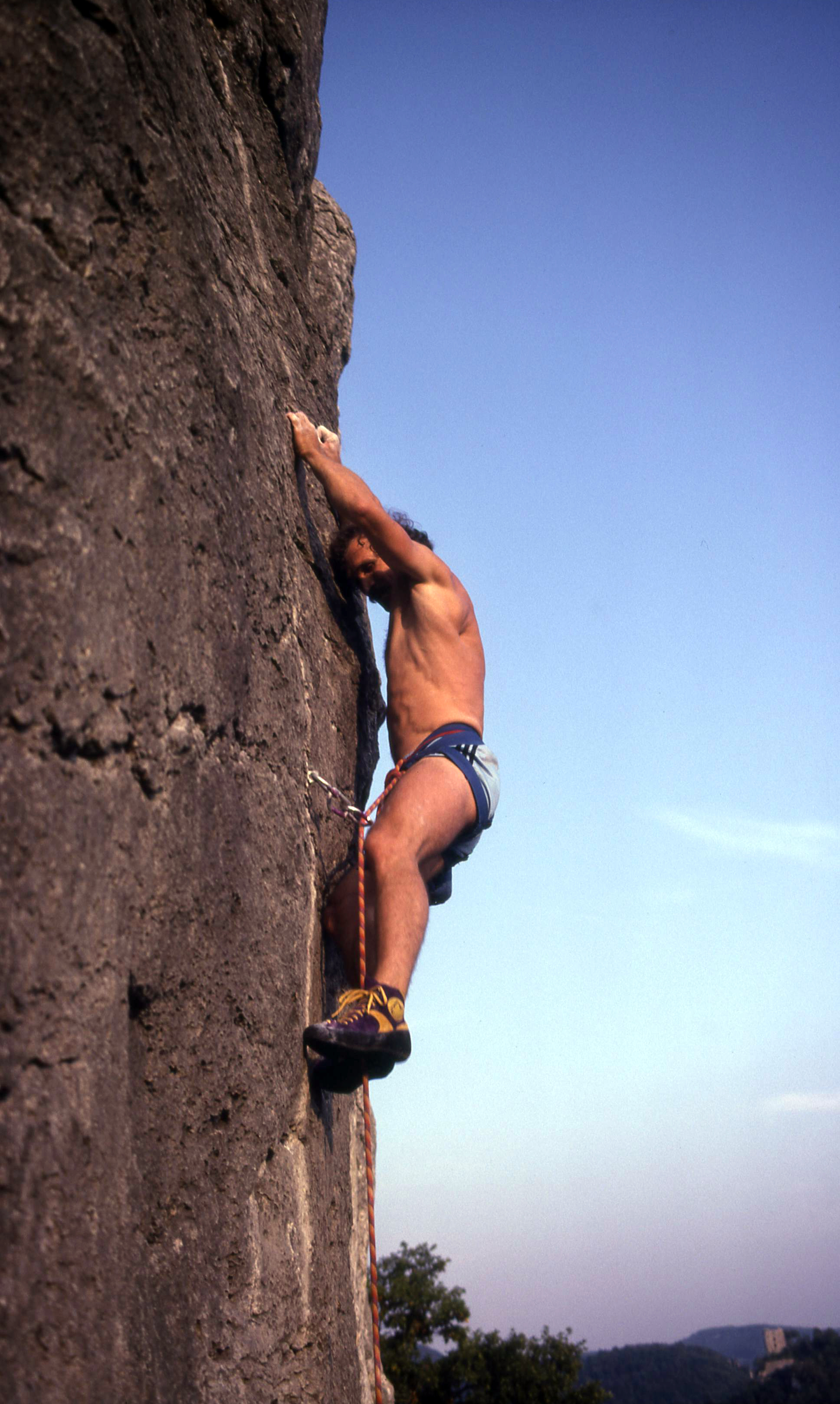
Kurt Albert climbing at the "Streitberger Schild" near Streitberg, Frankenjura, Germany, the place where he made the first Rotpunkt in 1975.

In rock climbing, a redpoint is a successful free-climb of a climbing route that is performed by a lead climber. The lead climber can use rock-climbing equipment only for their protection, and not as an artificial aid to rest or help them ascend. The lead climber can have attempted or practised the route many times beforehand, such as by headpointing or top roping.

When performed on the first attempt, a successful redpoint is typically called onsight (without prior knowledge about beta), or flash (with beta provided by others). Typically, lead climbers try to redpoint a route after having failed to onsight or flash it. Regardless of the number of attempts required to perform it, the first successful redpoint of a climbing route is recorded as the first free ascent (FFA) of that route.

== Description ==
In contrast to an onsight or flash attempt, for a redpoint ascent it is not relevant whether the lead climber had previously failed on the route, or practiced any of the individual movements required to climb it. It is also acceptable to undertake prior inspections of the route to learn its beta, for example by abseiling down the route.

If the lead climber falls during an attempted redpoint ascent and thus ends up in a position of hanging from the rope so that their bodyweight is being held — even partly — by the rope, then they must return to the very bottom of the route, pull their rope free of the route (e.g. free from any climbing protection), and re-start their redpoint ascent from scratch. Pulling the rope free before re-starting is also known as "climbing a route clean" but this should not be confused with the broader topic of clean climbing.

Climbers can pause and rest during a redpoint ascent but they cannot use the rope—or any other artificial aids—to hold their bodyweight while they rest. Unaided resting techniques such as the kneebar and the bat hang are allowed. Hangdogging is where the climber rests on the rope after falling but then restarts climbing without returning to the ground—this is not allowed for a redpoint. The first climber to redpoint a route, in the absence of any prior onsight or flash of the route, has made the first free ascent (FFA) of that route.

Where quickdraws are pre-placed into the fixed protection bolts on sport climbing routes, so that a climber is just clipping the rope into the quickdraws as they ascend, it is called a "pinkpoint" — in practice, most ascents of extreme sport climbing routes are done as pinkpoints, as are ascents in modern competition climbing, so the term "pinkpoint" is no longer used in these instances. However, due to additional significant challenge of placing climbing protection while ascending traditional climbing routes, traditional climbers continue to differentiate between whether their first free ascent was a pinkpoint (e.g. as Swiss traditional climber Didier Berthod did on making the first ascent of The Crack of Destiny in 2023) or a full redpoint.

=== Comparisons ===
The unlimited practice that is allowed before making a redpoint ascent contrasts with the historical aversion to "headpointing" (i.e. practicing the route on a toprope beforehand) in traditional climbing. In the early 1980s, redpointing was therefore a term largely exclusive to sport climbing. While headpointing was then considered a lesser form of first free ascent in traditional climbing (and an FFA that was headpointed would be asterisked as such), leading traditional climbers eventually followed the redpointing practices of the sport climbers, and by the 2000s, had largely dispensed with the stigma associated with headpointing.

From about the 2010s, traditional climbers were using the derived term "greenpoint" (or the Grünpunkt, as a play on the Rotpunkt), to describe climbing a pre-bolted sport-climb, but only using "traditional protection" (i.e. climbing protection that is not permanently fixed via pre-placed bolts or pitons); as with redpointing, the climber may have repeatedly practiced falling on the “traditional protection” before making their greenpoint ascent. Notable examples include Austrian climber Beat Kammerlander's greenpoint of Prinzip Hoffnung (5.14a R, 2009) in Bürs in Austria, and Canadian Sonnie Trotter's greenpoint of The Path (5.14a R, 2007) in Lake Louise, Alberta, and of East Face (Monkey Face) (5.13d R, 2004) at Smith Rocks.

=== Projecting ===
Repeatedly trying to make a redpoint ascent of a route can take place over any length of time, from hours to years (i.e. any time, once the initial onsight or flash attempt has failed). Climbers use the term projecting to denote a longer-term project to complete the FFA, or their own personal first ascent, of a route that is at the limit of their abilities. The redpoint FFA of many of contemporary sport climbing routes, particularly those that involved breaking new grade milestones, took years, and even decades, to project (e.g. Realization, La Dura Dura, and Jumbo Love).

The term projecting is most commonly used in bouldering, where in addition, the completion of a bouldering route is rarely called a 'redpoint' but instead the boulderer is usually deemed to have 'solved' the route in the manner of it being akin to a short technical problem.

== Etymology ==
The English term "redpoint" is a loan translation of the German Rotpunkt that was coined by Kurt Albert in the mid-1970s at Frankenjura. Albert would paint a red "X" on any fixed metal pitons on a rock climbing route so that he could avoid using them while climbing, thus not using any artificial aid. Once Albert was able to free-climb the entire route, and avoid all the red "X"s, he would then paint a red "dot" (the "Roter Punkt") at the base of the route. His first Rotpunkt was the aid climbing route Adolf-Rott-Gedächtnis-Weg (V+/A1) at the Streitberger Schild crag in the Frankenjura, which he freed at 6a+ (5.10b) in 1975. Albert got the idea for the "red dot" from the logo and name of a brand of German coffee and kettle maker. To achieve a Rotpunkt, Albert additionally defined that if a climber fell during the ascent, they had to return to the base, pull the rope free, and re-start the climb from scratch (i.e. as if the climber had only just approached it).

The connotation spread of a "redpoint" being a route that had to be repeatedly attempted because it was so hard – which is why metal pitons had been hammered into the rock as an aid in the first place – until it could be climbed in one clean push (i.e. no falls, and any falls required a full re-start), and without any artificial aids. Because these routes were already established aid climbing routes, Albert could not remove the pitons (that would happen in later decades), however, his Rotpunkt laid down a mark to other climbers that the route could be free climbed without the use of the metal aids, and thus became an important moment in the development of free climbing. Eventually, Albert's Rotpunkte became associated with the development of sport climbing in the 1980s, as many of these aids were on routes that had no possibility of even natural traditional climbing protection (e.g. no cracks), and thus bolts would be needed for protection (but not aid).

== Notable redpoints ==
Notable redpointed climbs are chronicled by the climbing media to track progress in rock climbing standards and levels of technical difficulty; in contrast, the hardest traditional climbing routes tend to be of lower technical difficulty due to the additional burden of having to place protection during the course of the climb, and due to the lack of any possibility of using natural protection on extreme sport climbs.

As of October 2026, the world's hardest redpointed routes are Silence by Adam Ondra, DNA by Seb Bouin (with a notable first-ever 9c repeat by Jakob Schubert), B.I.G. by Jakob Schubert, Duality of Man by Sean Bailey, and Café Colombia by Jorge Díaz-Rullo which are all at a proposed grade of 9c (5.15d). As of June 2025, one female climber, Brooke Raboutou, has redpointed an established route just one grade point lower at 9b+ (5.15c), with her 2025 ascent of Excalibur.

== See also ==
- Beta (climbing)
- History of rock climbing
- List of grade milestones in rock climbing
