= Realization (climb) =

Sport climbing route in France

- Biographie
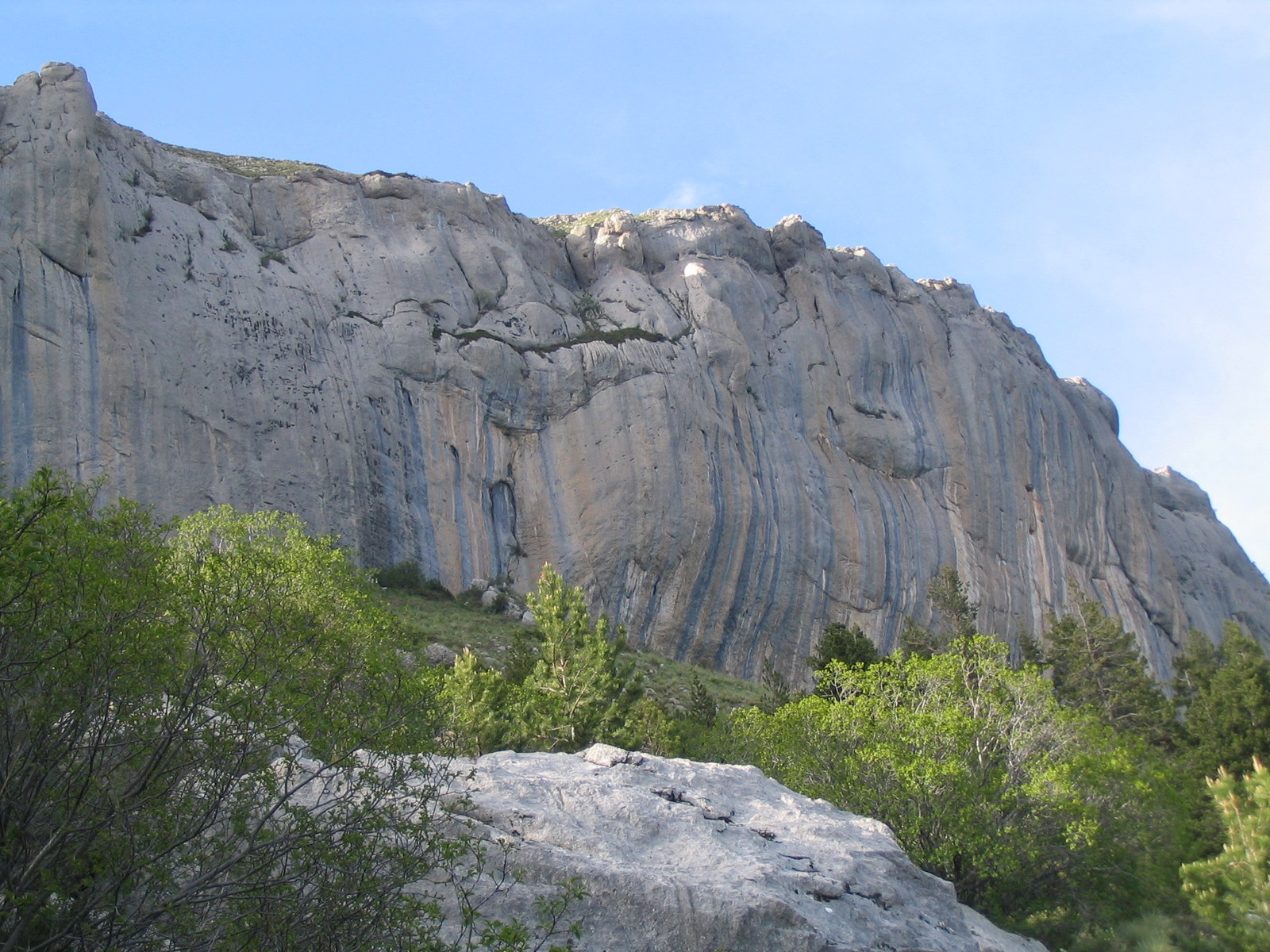
- Sectors Berlin (left) and Biographie (right, overhanging) on the Corniche de Céûse

- Location within France
- Location: Céüse, France
- Coordinates: 44.4981333°N 5.9482208°E
- Climbing area: Céüse
- Route type: Sport climbing; Face climbing
- Rock type: Limestone
- Vertical gain: 35-metre (115 ft)
- Pitches: 1
- Technical grade: 9a+ (5.15a)
- Bolted by: Jean-Christophe Lafaille, 1989.
- First free ascent: Chris Sharma, 18 July 2001
- First female free ascent: Margo Hayes, 24 September 2017
- Known for: First-ever consensus 9a+ (5.15a) in history (Note: It is possible that it was not the actual first-ever 9a+ route to be climbed, as in 2008 Czech climber Adam Ondra estimated that Alexander Huber's 1996 ascent of Open Air (in Tyrol, Austria) was at 9a+ (5.15a). Climbing author Andrew Bisharat notes in a 2016 essay on climbing re-grades, that "The other interesting point about Open Air that's worth mentioning is that the route reportedly contains some rather flaky holds that have broken off over the years. So was the Open Air that Ondra climbed the exact same route that Alex Huber climbed? Maybe, but probably not."); Third-ever female ascent at 9a+ (5.15a) in history; Part of the "9a+ trilogy" with La Rambla and Papichulo

Realization, also called Biographie, is a circa 35-metre (115 ft) sport climbing route on an overhanging limestone cliff on the southern face of Céüse mountain, near Gap and Sigoyer, in France. After it was first climbed in 2001 by American climber Chris Sharma, it became the first rock climb in the world to have a consensus grade of 9a+ (5.15a). It is considered an historic and important route in rock climbing, and one of the most attempted climbs at its grade.

== History ==
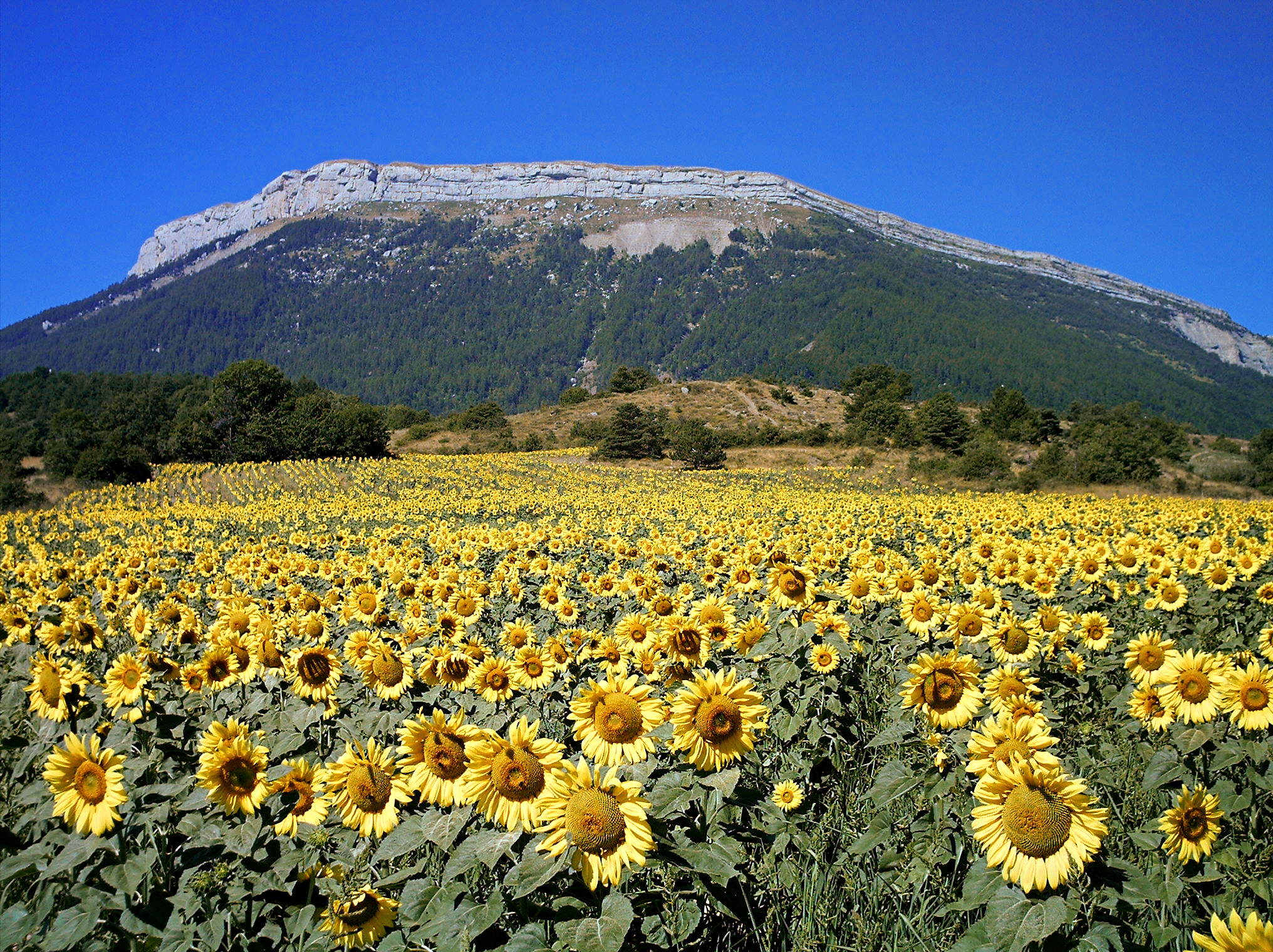
Long south-facing cliffs of Céüse, known as the Corniche de Céûse

In 1989, French climber Jean-Christophe Lafaille bolted the entire 35 metre pitch, and named it Biographie, but he was not able to climb it. Biographie remained a long-standing open project, and in 1996, French climber Arnaud Petit freed the lower half, added an anchor at his high-point and graded it at 8c+ (5.14c). Petit estimated that the remaining unclimbed section was about 8b+ (5.14a) but had a very difficult 7C (V9) boulder problem that he could not overcome. American climber Chris Sharma made over 30 attempts from 1996 to 2000 but could also not overcome the boulder move. In 2001, Sharma skipped the Bouldering World Cup in Gap, and after three days working on the route, on 18 July 2001, successfully free climbed the route, linking up Petit's first section to Lafaille's final bolt.

Sharma's first ascent was captured in Josh Lowell's 2002 climbing film, Dosage Volume 1. Witnessing his ascent was a 10-year old Charlotte Durif, who was out hiking with her father.

Sharma did not assign a grade to the climb. however he did name it Realization. The naming was a source of controversy as in France climbing routes are named by the person who first bolted the route, while in the U.S. (and the U.K.), they are named by the first person to successfully free climb the route. Sharma would later clarify:

I named the route Realization because the first part "Biographie" ended in the middle and I wanted to differentiate the two. Then there was some frustration from the French that I changed the name etc. So upon speaking with some French friends, I understood the history of the line and the tradition in France that the bolter names it, and I told them "that's fine with me to call it Biographie". ... I guess the whole thing was a bit confusing due to the middle anchor and not wanting to discredit the first pitch or have the name be exactly the same as the first part. For me personally, people can call it whatever they want. Naming things is just for fun. ... That piece of rock was there long, long, before us, so to get worked up about naming it is kinda ridiculous.

Though only aged 20 at the time of the ascent, Sharma considered retiring, but found new inspiration in extreme deep-water soloing routes in Mallorca. It took almost three years until the second ascent of the route, which was made by French climber, Sylvain Millet, who also refused to grade it given his lack of experience of other equivalent reference climbs, however, he noted that the failure of other strong climbers to repeat the route (e.g. Patxi Usobiaga, and Dave Graham), implied that 9a+ was the likely grade.

On 24 September 2017, American climber Margo Hayes became the first female climber to climb the route. On 5 August 2020, German climber Alexander Megos created Bibliographie, a 9b+ (5.15c) route, a few metres to the right of Realization/Biographie.

== Route ==
The route starts with an immediate hard "four-move boulder problem", which partially broke in 2010, potentially rendering the lower section even more difficult (it has been compared to the notable bouldering problem, Necessary Evil, an 8c+ route). Sustained 5.13 climbing after the initial bouldering problem leads to the main rest, a large right-facing flake. After this pause, a series of "super-resistant two and three-finger pocket moves", with cross-throughs, underclings, and high-steps lead to Arnaud Petit's old anchor (now since removed), which is almost halfway.

To the anchor, the route is considered 5.14c (8c+), although some have suggested an upgrade to 5.15a (9a+) due to the initial bottom boulder breaking. There is a small rest at the old anchor, then sustained resistance climbing leads to a slightly better rest just below the finishing crux. This final crux is 12 moves, described as "a bunch of foot movement, and some very fickle pockets and crimps". Its difficulty is amplified by the amount of hard climbing undertaken to reach it. Above this crux is a small rest, and 5.11 climbing for 50 feet leads to the final anchor at around the 35-meter mark (115 feet).

== Legacy ==
Realization was the first route to carry a consensus 9a+ (5.15a) grade, and Climbing called it a "technical revolution" in rock climbing. The quality and sustained difficulty of Realization means it is still considered an important rite-of-passage for the world's best rock climbers, whose repeat ascents of the "legendary" route, are covered by the climbing media. Outside magazine called it "the benchmark for the grade", and it has become one of the most attempted and repeated routes at the grade at 9a+ (5.15a). In 2014, National Geographic called it, "one of the most famous sport-climbing routes in the world". PlanetMountain included Realization on its list of important climbs in the evolution of free climbing (1918–2013).

In 2012, when Adam Ondra attempted to flash the route (i.e. complete on the first attempt) he said: "It had always been my long-term crazy dream to flash this route". In 2014, when American climber Jonathan Siegrist made the eighth ascent of the route and told Outside magazine: "I can remember the first time that I saw the route—it is truly magnificent. I was shocked to see that such a bold and impressive, seemingly perfect line exists. Add to that, the historic significance of this climb, not to mention its unique and brilliant holds and movement—it really is a proud route". On repeating the route in 2014, German climber Alexander Megos said: "I wanted to climb this route because it is the world’s first 9a+ and definitely one of the most famous routes worldwide! But it’s not just the history behind the route, also the route itself is one of the best ones I ever climbed!". In 2016, remembering his own 2015 repeat of the route, Italian climber Stefano Ghisolfi called it, "...perhaps the most famous cutting-edge route in the world".

=== Subsequent first 9a+ contendors ===
Many years after the ascent of Realization, other earlier sport climbs have been revisited as potential first-ever 9a+ routes:

- In 2008, Adam Ondra completed the second ascent of Alexander Huber's 1996 route Open Air at Austria's Schleierfall, and felt it was 9a+ (5.15a); Huber freed it in 1996 and graded it as 9a (5.14d), but Ondra felt that Open Air was harder than "benchmark" climbs such as Weiss Rose, Action Directe, and even La Rambla, which are 9a (5.14d) or 9a+ (5.15a).
- In 2021, Will Bosi completed the second ascent of Steve McClure's 1998 route Mutation at Raven Tor crag in Millers Dale, in the Peak District in England, and felt it was 9a+ (5.15a); McClure freed it in 1998 and graded it as 9a (5.14d). Bosi felt it was possibly even 9b (5.15b).

== Ascents ==
Realization, or Biographie, has been ascended by:

- 1st. Chris Sharma on July 18, 2001
- 2nd. Sylvain Millet on May 24, 2004
- 3rd. Patxi Usobiaga on July 29, 2004
- 4th. Dave Graham on July 30, 2007
- 5th. Ethan Pringle on September 2, 2007
- 6th. Ramón Puigblanque on July 27, 2008
- 7th. Enzo Oddo on August 15, 2010
- 8th. Jonathan Siegrist on June 1, 2014
- 9th. Alex Megos on July 11, 2014
- 10th. Adam Ondra on July 22, 2014
- 11th. Sachi Amma on August 7, 2014
- 12th. Stefano Ghisolfi on June 22, 2015
- 13th. Jon Cardwell on May 25, 2016
- 14th. Sean Bailey on August 5, 2016
- 15th & 1st Female Free Ascent. Margo Hayes on September 24, 2017 (third-ever female ascent at the grade of 9a+)
- 16th. Piotr Schab on July 3, 2018
- 17th. Stefano Carnati on September 22, 2018
- 18th. Jorge Díaz-Rullo on July 13, 2019
- 19th. Sébastien Bouin on June 13, 2020
- 20th. Matty Hong on May 29, 2023.
- 21st. Satone Yoshida on August 16, 2025.

== Filmography ==
- Chris Sharma's FFA: Lowell, Josh (director) (11 February 2002). Dosage Volume I (Motion picture). Big UP Productions. ASIN B000NOK288.
- Jonathan Siegrist's 8th ascent: Saarentola, Donna (director) (5 August 2014). Nomad Episode 1 (Motion picture). Bearcam Media.
- Margo Hayes' FFFA: Hong, Matty; Mortimer, Peter (director) (2 November 2017). Break on Through (ReelRock 12) (Motion picture). Sender Films.
- Seb Bouin's 19th ascent: Pilcher, Hugo (director) (October 2020). Seb Bouin's Vintage Rock Tour - Episode 3 (Motion picture). EpicTV.

== See also ==
- History of rock climbing
- List of grade milestones in rock climbing
- Silence, first climb in the world with a potential grade of 9c (5.15d)
- La Dura Dura, second climb in the world with a consensus grade of 9b+ (5.15c)
- Jumbo Love, first climb in the world with a consensus grade of 9b (5.15b)
- La Rambla, second consensus 9a+ (5.15a), and forms the coveted "9a+ Trilogy" with Realization/Biographie and Papichulo
- Action Directe, first climb in the world with a consensus grade of 9a (5.14d)
- Hubble, first climb in the world with a consensus grade of 8c+ (5.14c)
