= Clark Mountain (California) =

Mountain in California, United States

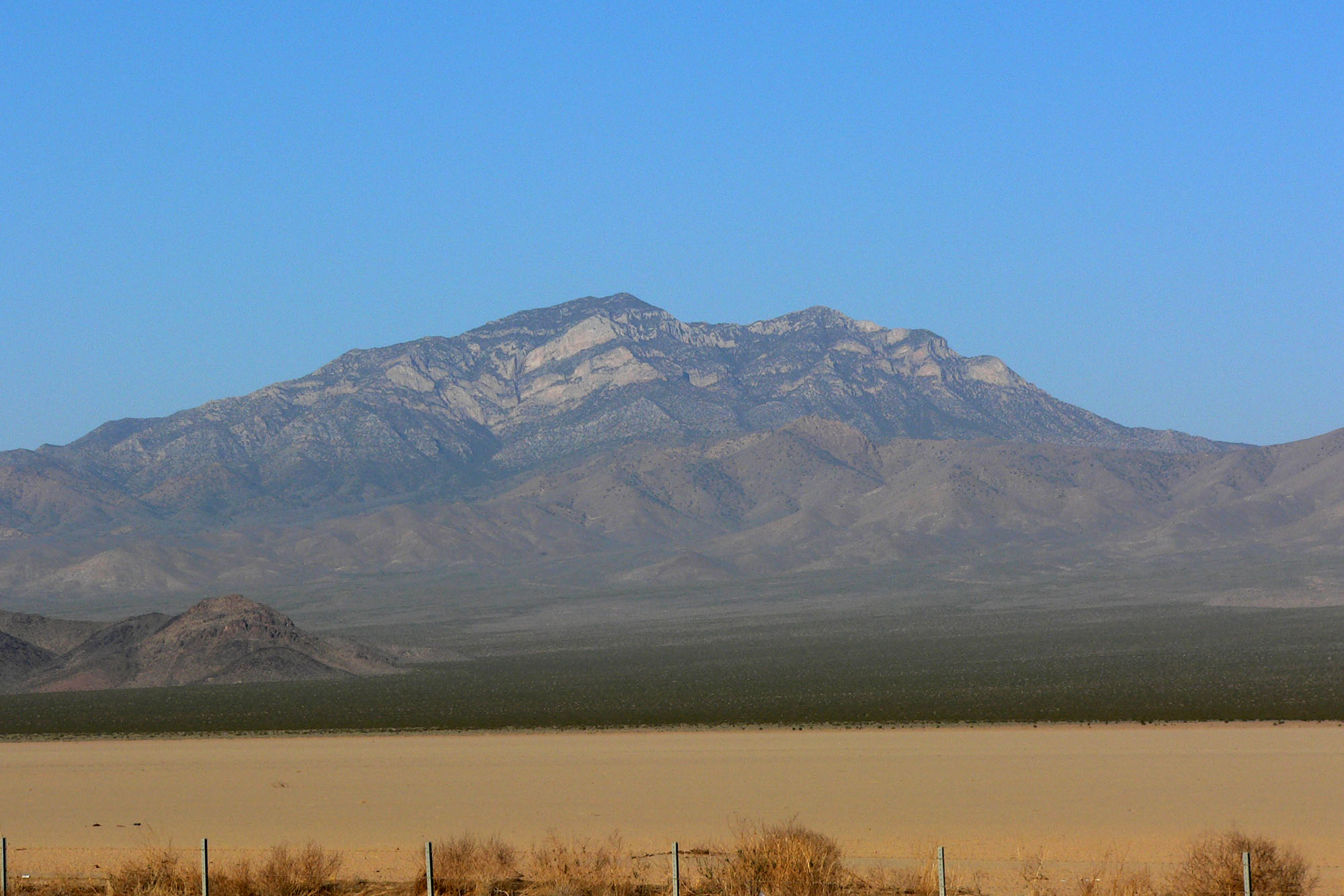
- The mountain is prominently visible to motorists on Interstate 15 crossing Ivanpah Dry Lake.

Highest point
- Elevation: 7,933 ft (2,418 m) NAVD 88
- Prominence: 4,232 ft (1,290 m)
- Listing: Desert Peaks Section List
- Coordinates: 35°31′32″N 115°35′19″W

Geography
- Location: San Bernardino County, California, U.S.
- Parent range: Clark Mountain Range
- Topo map: USGS Clark Mountain

Climbing
- Easiest route: Exposed scramble, class 3

Clark Mountain is a mountain located in the Clark Mountain Range in the Mojave National Preserve, close to the California-Nevada border.

== Geography ==
The mountain rises abruptly north of Mountain Pass and Interstate 15 to an elevation of 7,933 ft (2,418 m), which is the highest point of the Mojave National Preserve and the Mojave Desert ranges.

Path 46 and Path 64 (part of Path 46) 500 kV power lines run to the north and south of the mountain, respectively.

== Ecology ==
The higher elevations of the mountain are a striking sky island contrast to the lower elevations of the Mojave Desert vegetation. Creosote bush (Larrea tridentata), scrub and Joshua tree (Yucca brevifolia) forests grow on the foothills of the mountain while single-leaf pinyon pine (Pinus monophylla), Utah juniper (Juniperus osteosperma), and white fir (Abies concolor) grow on the sky island at the highest elevations.

The high elevation of the mountain means that snow falls on the high peaks during the winter, although the mountain receives little precipitation annually.

== Recreation ==
Clark Mountain is also a world-class rock climbing area developed by Randy Leavitt in 1992. It has been described as containing the best limestone climbing in America and includes the world's first-ever 9b (5.15b) route, Chris Sharma's Jumbo Love (2008). In 2022, French climber Seb Bouin, added a direct start to Jumbo Love to create Suprême Jumbo Love, which at 9b+ (5.15c), became the hardest sport climb in North America.

== See also ==
- Mojave National Preserve
