= La Dura Dura =

Sport climbing route in Spain

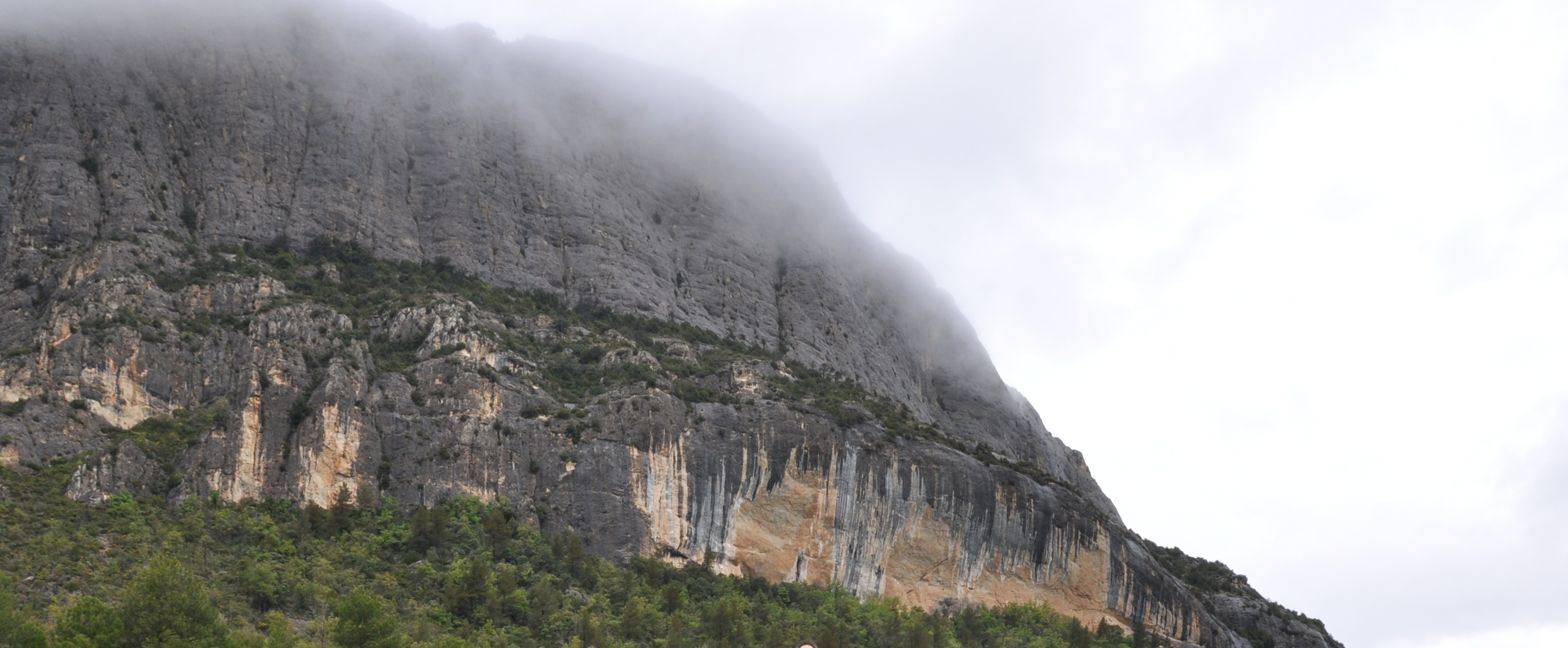
- The multi-coloured cliff of the Contrafort de Rumbau; La Dura Dura is situated on the long-bright blue streaks near the centre of the cliffs.

- Location within Spain
- Location: Oliana, Spain
- Coordinates: 42°04′40″N 1°17′16″E
- Climbing area: Roc de Rumbau, Oliana
- Route type: Sport climbing; Face climbing
- Rock type: Limestone
- Vertical gain: 50 metres (160 ft)
- Pitches: 1
- Technical grade: 9b+ (5.15c)
- Bolted by: Chris Sharma
- First free ascent: Adam Ondra, 7 February 2013
- Known for: Second-ever consensus 9b+ (5.15c) in history

La Dura Dura is a 50-metre (160 ft) sport climbing route on the multi-coloured limestone cliffs known as the Contrafort de Rumbau, which are part of the Roc de Rumbau mountain, that lies in Oliana, Spain. The route was bolted and developed by American climber Chris Sharma in 2009 who had almost given up believing he could climb it until a collaboration with Czech climber Adam Ondra led to Ondra climbing the route on 7 February 2013, followed by Sharma on 23 March 2013.

La Dura Dura became one of the first rock climbs in the world to achieve a grade of 9b+ (5.15c), and was the first consensus grade at that level (i.e. more than one climber agreed to it). (Note: In August 2022, French climber Seb Bouin, and frequent climbing partner of Ondra, made the third ascent of Change and felt that the discovery of a kneebar made the grade it 9b/9b+ (5.15b/c), thus making La Dura Dura the world's first 9b+.) The route has not been repeated since Ondra's and Sharma's 2013 ascents. Being two of the leading rock climbers in the world at that time, their unique collaboration was widely followed in the climbing media; it is an important route in rock climbing history. The cliff was badly damaged by a fire in 2022.

== History ==
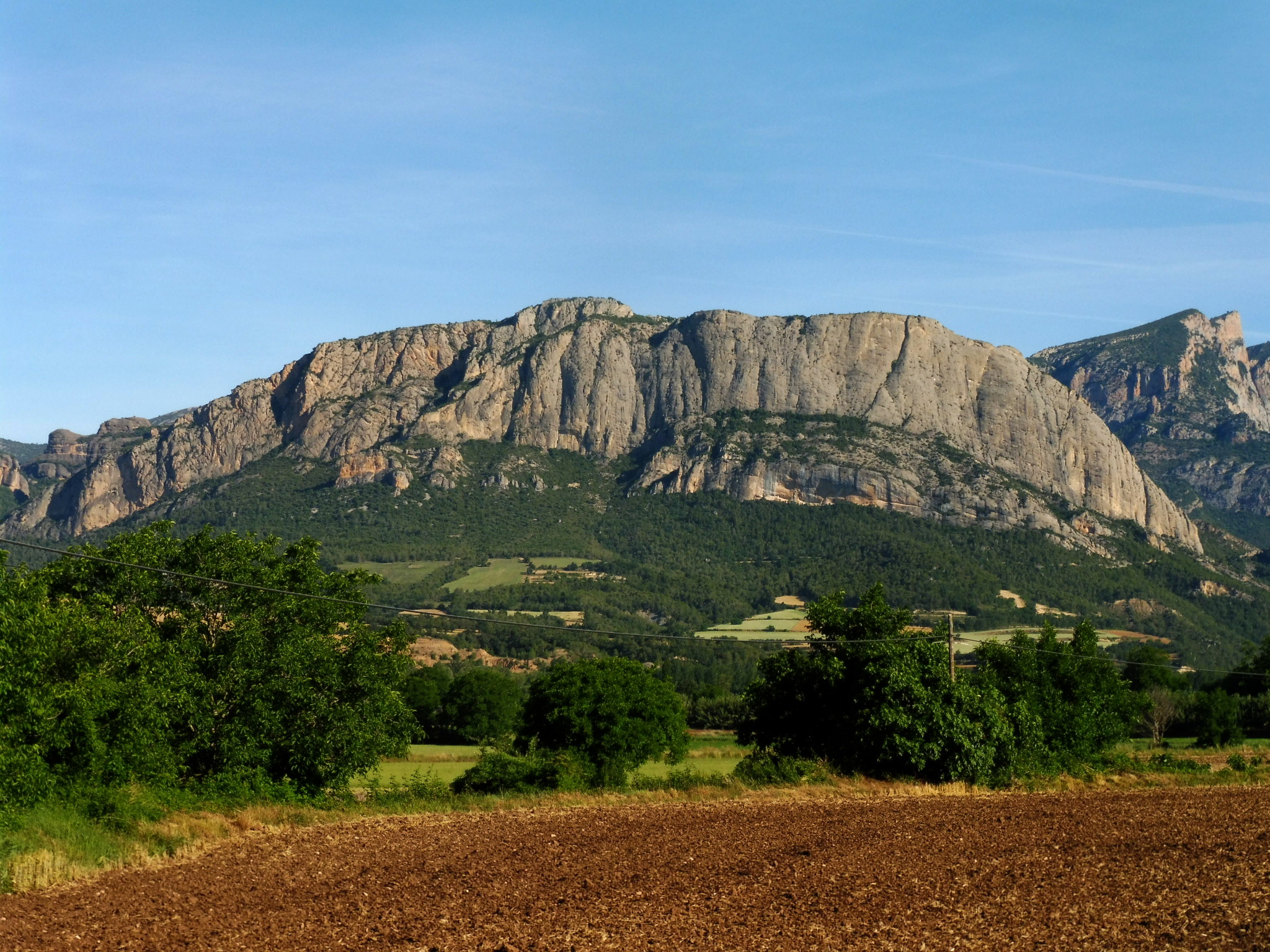
Roc de Rumbau, in Oliana, Spain. The "Contrafort de Rumbau" (with La Dura Dura) is the brightly coloured lower cliffs at the right-of-centre of picture.

American climber Chris Sharma had been pushing the global standards of sport climbing, first freeing Realization in 2001, the world's first consensus 9a+ (5.15a), and then freeing Jumbo Love in 2008, the world's first consensus 9b (5.15b).

Sharma bolted La Dura Dura in 2009, saying: "If you're going to spend so much time on something, the line must really be worthwhile and it's difficult to find something that is at your limit and also fits your style"; and also, that "it was a beautiful, if blank-looking, streak of blue and white limestone". As he spent time working out and attempting to free La Dura Dura, Sharma became disillusioned at the feasibility of the route due to the tiny "crimper" moves on the first 10 metres of the route, and by 2011 had almost abandoned his project saying, "I figured it would be for the next generation".

Sharma invited Czech climber Adam Ondra to see if he could solve the route, and they spent early 2012 alternating belays and ideas on how to climb it, and in particular, the first part of the route where the bouldering grade was a near 8B (V13). The pair suspended their work until the end of that year when Ondra made five trips over nine weeks to Oliana, and eventually free climbed the route on 7 February 2013. Ondra said that solving the crux 15-move bouldering problem at the start of the climb, took eight of the nine weeks. Sharma did the second ascent on 23 March 2013.

Ondra assigned a grade of 9b+ (5.15c) to La Dura Dura saying that it was harder than any other 9b (5.15b) he had done at that time, and that it was also harder than his October 2012 ascent of Change in Flatanger, Norway, which he also proposed at 9b+ (5.15c) (thus at the time making Change the world's first 9b+; however, in 2022 it was downgraded). Ondra said that Change suited his style better and only took him five weeks to complete, whereas La Dura Dura was "more straightforward climbing, but you really need to get everything wired 100%", and that: "I'd say that for me La Dura Dura is a better achievement because it fits my style less". Sharma agreed with Ondra on the grade adding: "Well if Adam thinks it is 9b+ it probably is, he probably knows more about this grade than anybody so he's sure to be right".

The climb was well-known in the climbing world owing to its difficulty level, its possibility of being a benchmark in the grading system for climbs, and the involvement of Chris Sharma and Adam Ondra together in it. Their work together on the climb was recorded by Josh Lowell in a film that was included in the compilation "Reel Rock 7," in 2012, The film was released again in 2014 under the title "La Dura Complete". According to the climbers, the teamwork motivated each other to push harder in sports.

== Route ==
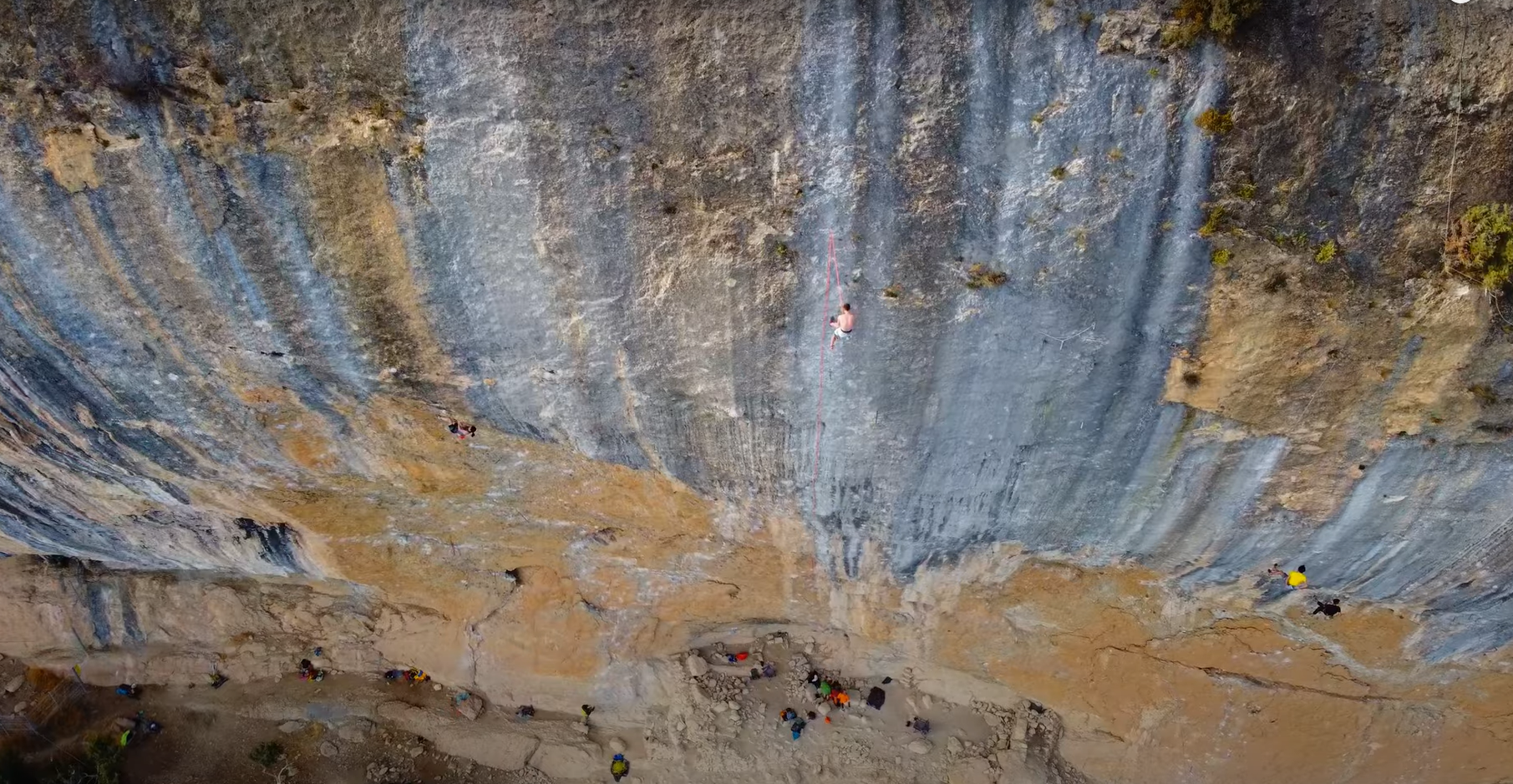
The distinctive multi-coloured central face of the Contrafort de Rumbau; the climber pitcured is on Joe Blau 8c+ (5.14c) and La Dura Dura is at far left.

The most technically difficult part is the first 10-metre section, which Ondra and Sharma described as "really bouldery" with 15 moves that would constitute a 9b/b+ climb on their own. Ondra described this first section as requiring big reaches on crimpy holds and underclings, which lead to a "huge span rightward onto a crimp, and dyno from there onto a good hueco". In all, Ondra broke this first section into four separate boulder problems, that a separated from bolt-to-bolt, with approximately four moves for each one of them, and that had respective bouldering grades of: V9 (7C), V9 (7C), V12 (8A+), V11 (8A).

After the bouldering section is a 10-metre 8c+ (5.14c) section with a 4-metre climb to a kneebar, which Ondra described as "super-awkward and tricky" and "Not a proper no-hands rest, but it is possible to cool down a little". After the kneebar, the next 6-metres are described as "really intense", with "a shoulder-breaking dyno into big reaches on pinches and crimps with two 'stop' moves right below the jug". Both Ondra and Sharma took many falls in this section. This is at halfway, but with the cruxes completed – the final 20-meters is at 8b (5.13d).

== Legacy ==
La Dura Dura became the world's first repeated and thus confirmed 9b+ (5.15c) climb—Ondra's Change is recorded as the first 9b+, but that route was not repeated until 2020 by Italian Stefano Ghisolfi who confirmed the grade. For years, it was listed as the "world's hardest climb" as Ondra said it was harder than Change. La Dura Dura held this title until Ondra's 2017 ascent of Silence which he proposed at the higher grade of 9c (5.15d). In August 2022, French climber Seb Bouin, and climbing partner of Ondra, made the third ascent of Change and felt the discovery of a kneebar graded it 9b/9b+ (5.15b/c), thus potentially making La Dura Dura the world's first 9b+ graded rock climbing route.

The climbing media have speculated on why La Dura Dura had not had a third ascent—even by 2022, an important 9b+ route from 2020 called Bibliographie, had been repeated twice. Both Sharma and Ondra, as well as being two of the world's best climbers, are also tall climbers with long reaches and this may make specific parts of the lower bouldering type cruxes harder for shorter climbers; others speculate that La Dura Dura is really closer to 5.15d (9c). The situation is similar to Golpe de Estado, which is another route that only Sharma (FFA in 2008) and Ondra (in 2010) have climbed, and while graded 9b (5.15b), Sharma believes that it will prove to be 9b+ (5.15c), making it the world's first at that grade.

Outside called Ondra and Sharma's trials on La Dura Dura a "near Shakespearean drama". After Ondra's ascent of La Dura Dura and Change, National Geographic added Ondra to this 2013 list of "Adventurers of the Year", and noted the significance of Ondra and Sharma's collaboration as being a defining moment in the sport of rock climbing when the title of "world's best climber" was passed from one generation to the next.

== Wildfire and climbing ban ==
On 19 June 2022, a wildfire broke out in a nearby field that badly affected the Oliana crag that holds La Dura Dura with reports of holds breaking off and lower sections completely destroyed; the full extent of the damage is as yet unclear. However, in a series of Instagram posts released in early 2024, Chris Sharma indicated that he had resumed his efforts on his longstanding project Le Blond. Despite the route being immediately adjacent to La Dura Dura, no mention was made of damage to the crag. In December 2025, the authorities placed a ban on climbing in the area to protect the pre-historic rock art around the Contrafort del Rumbau.

== Ascents ==
La Dura Dura has been ascended by:

- 1st Adam Ondra, 7 February 2013
- 2nd Chris Sharma, 23 March 2013

== Filmography ==
- Ondra and Sharma's 2012 attempts: Lowell, Josh (director) (2012). Reel Rock 7 (Motion picture). Sender Films.
- Ondra and Sharma's 2013 ascents: Lowell, Josh (director) (2014). La Dura Complete (Motion picture). Big UP Productions.

== See also ==
- History of rock climbing
- List of first ascents (sport climbing)
- Silence, first climb in the world with a potential grade of 9c (5.15d)
- Jumbo Love, first climb in the world with a consensus grade of 9b (5.15b)
- Realization/Biographie, first/second climb in the world with a consensus grade of 9a+ (5.15a)
- Action Directe, first climb in the world with a consensus grade of 9a (5.14d)
- Hubble, first climb in the world with a consensus grade of 8c+ (5.14c)
