= Jorge Díaz-Rullo =

Spanish rock climber (born 1999)

Personal information
- Full name: Jorge Díaz-Rullo Calvo
- Born: 10 January 1999 (age 27) Madrid, Spain
- Occupation: Professional rock climber

Climbing career
- Type of climber: Sport climbing; Bouldering; Free solo climbing; Competition climbing
- Highest grade: Onsight/Flash: 8c+ (5.14c) (flash); Bouldering: 8C+ (V16); Free solo: 8b+ (5.14a)
- First ascents: Café Colombia (9c, 2026)
- Retired from competition: 2024
- Known for: Fifth-ever person to redpoint a route at the grade of 9c (5.15d)
- Updated on 17 May 2026

Jorge Díaz-Rullo (born 10 June 1999) is a Spanish rock climber who has redpointed of some of the hardest sport climbing routes in the world, including Bibliographie in Ceuse and Change in the Hanshelleren Cave, both at 9b+ (5.15c). In March 2026, he completed the first free ascent of his long-standing multi-year project in the Finestra cave in Margalef, Café Colombia, and proposed a grade of 9c (5.15d), making it only the fifth-ever rock climb in history to carry that grade.

Díaz-Rullo is also one of the few climbers in history to have free soloed an 8b+ (5.14a) graded climbing route, which he did with his 2021 ascent of Darwin Dixit in Margalef. In 2024, he solved his first V16 (8C+) bouldering route with Muerte por Asfixia in La Pedriza in Spain. In April 2026, he flashed La Novena Puerta, making him one of the few climbers in the world to flash a consensus 8c+ (5.14c) route. Díaz-Rullo has onsighted several routes at the grade of 8c (5.14b).

== See also ==
- Seb Bouin
- List of grade milestones in rock climbing
