= Bibliographie (climb) =

Sport climbing route in France

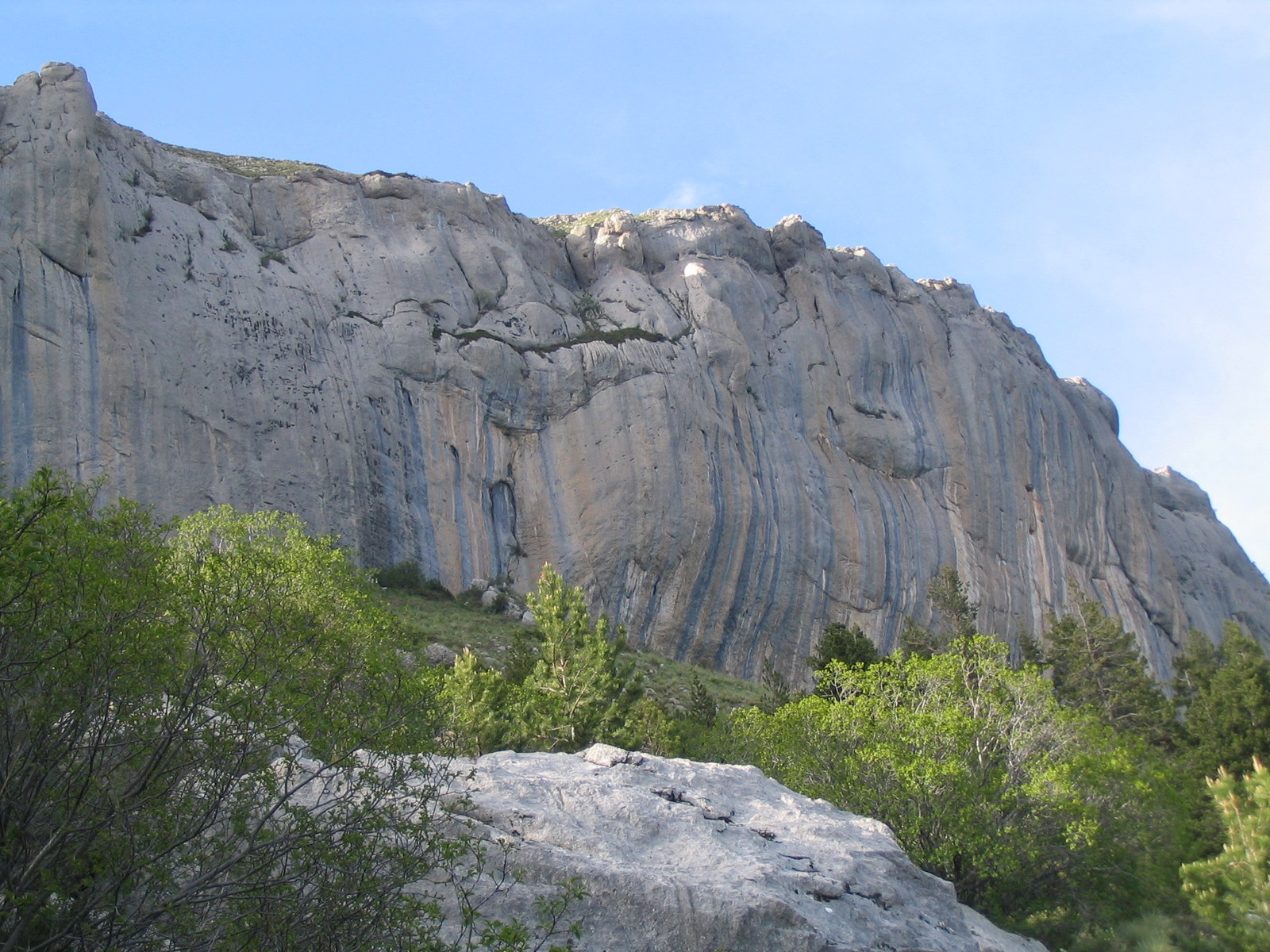
- Sector Biographie on the Corniche de Céüse cliff, which contains Realization and Bibliographie

- Location within France
- Location: Hautes-Alpes, France
- Coordinates: 44.49797°N 5.948°E
- Climbing area: Céüse
- Route type: Sport climbing; Overhang climbing
- Rock type: Limestone
- Vertical gain: 35-metre (115 ft)
- Pitches: 1
- Technical grade: 9b+ (5.15c)
- Bolted by: Ethan Pringle, 2009
- First free ascent: Alexander Megos, 5 August 2020
- First female free ascent: Janja Garnbret, 6 June 2026
- Known for: Fifth 9b+ (5.15c) in history; Second female ascent of a 9b+ (5.15c) in history; Third female ascent of a 9b+ (5.15c) in history

Bibliographie is a circa 35-metre (115 ft) sport climbing route on a limestone cliff on the southern face of Céüse mountain, near Gap and Sigoyer, in France. The route was bolted in 2009 by Ethan Pringle, and was first ascended by Alexander Megos on 5 August 2020. Megos initially graded the route as 9c (5.15d), the highest difficulty at that time. The route was repeated on 24 August 2021 by Stefano Ghisolfi, who graded the route as 9b+ (5.15c), which has become the consensus grade for Bibliographie, making it the fifth climb with a grade of 9b+ (5.15c).

As one of the most repeated of the small number of 9b+ (5.15c) graded routes in existence, Bibliographie became a "benchmark" for the technical grade of 9b+ amongst elite climbers, with consensus that it is at the grade (e.g., as opposed to Change whose grade has softened to 9b/+ with further repeats). In June 2026, Janja Garnbret made the first female free ascent (FFFA) of the route, which was the second female ascent of a 9b+ (5.15c) in history.

== History ==
Bibliographie was first bolted by the American climber Ethan Pringle in 2009, and it lies just a few metres to the right of Chris Sharma's famous 2001 Realization/Biography route.

Megos started working on the route in June 2017, and was unsuccessful after a four-week visit in September of that year. In June 2018, after 16 days of work, he freed the 9b+ (5.15c) graded route Perfecto Mundo, in Margalef, and decided to go straight to Céüse, but again without success. In 2019, he concentrated on climbing competitions spending just three days in Céüse. During the COVID-19 pandemic, all climbing competitions were canceled, so Megos refocused on Bibliographie again. On the last day of a trip to the crag, and after having fallen lower down on the route, Megos made the first free ascent of Bibliographie on 5 August 2020.

On 6 June 2026, Slovenian climber Janja Garnbret made the first female free ascent (FFFA) of the route, which was the second female ascent of a 9b+ (5.15c).

=== Grade ===
Megos spent 60 days working on Bibliographie, which led him to suggest a grade of 9c (5.15d) (i.e. it had taken him much longer than the 16 days needed for Perfecto Mundo, which was by then a consensus 9b+ route), making Bibliographie the second route at the grade, after Adam Ondra's Silence. At the time, Megos told Rock & Ice that grading such a route was particularly hard given he started with no beta, and had no other opinions to rely on; he added: "I am very curious about what the future of the route will look like, and grateful for other people’s opinions".

Other climbers unsuccessfully attempted Bibliographie including Jakob Schubert, Stefano Ghisolfi and Dave Graham. On 24 August 2021, Stefano Ghisolfi made the first repeat of Bibliographie but graded the route as 9b+ (5.15c); Ghisolfi had previously repeated Megos' Perfecto Mundo, which was a consensus 9b+, and also Adam Ondra's Change, which was also considered a 9b+ (although later softened to 9b+/). Megos consulted and publicly agreed with Ghisolfi, making 9b+ (5.15c) the accepted grade for Bibliographie; the fifth route to have such a grade.

Bibliographie would go on to be one of the most repeated of the few 9b+ (5.15c) graded routes then in existence, and thus it came to be considered a "benchmark" for the consensus grade of 9b+ (5.15c).

== Ascents ==
Bibliographie has been ascended by:

- 1st. Alexander Megos, 5 August 2020
- 2nd. Stefano Ghisolfi, August 2021
- 3rd. Sean Bailey, September 2021
- 4th. Sébastien Bouin, June 2023
- 5th. Jorge Díaz-Rullo, October 2023
- 6th and 1st Female Free Ascent. Janja Garnbret, June 2026 (second female ascent at the grade of 9b+)
- 7th. Laura Rogora, August 2026 (third female ascent at the grade of 9b+)

== See also ==
- History of rock climbing
- List of grade milestones in rock climbing
- Silence, first climb in the world with a potential grade of 9c (5.15d)
- La Dura Dura, second climb in the world to be graded 9b+ (5.15c)
- Realization/Biographie, first climb in the world with a consensus grade of 9a+ (5.15a)
- Action Directe, first climb in the world with a consensus grade of 9a (5.14d)
- Hubble, first climb in the world with a consensus grade of 8c+ (5.14c)
