= DNA (climb) =

Sport climbing route in France

- Location: La Ramirole, Verdon Gorge; Provence-Alpes-Côte d'Azur, France
- Climbing area: La Ramirole (Verdon Gorge)
- Route type: Sport climbing; Face climbing
- Vertical gain: c. 55 m
- Pitches: 1
- Technical grade: 9c (5.15d)
- Bolted by: Sébastien Bouin
- First free ascent: Sébastien Bouin, 29 April 2022

DNA is a single-pitch sport climbing route at the La Ramirole sector of the Verdon Gorge in France. It was bolted by French climber Sébastien Bouin and first climbed by him on 29 April 2022, with Bouin proposing a grade of 9c (5.15d).

Climbing media described the proposal as potentially the second sport route graded 9c (5.15d) after Silence (2017). It was repeated on 10 October 2026 by Jakob Schubert, who agreed on the grade of 9c (5.15d).

== History ==
PlanetMountain reported that Bouin scoped and bolted DNA in 2019, then worked the project over multiple seasons before completing the first ascent in April 2022. UKClimbing and PlanetMountain reported approximately 250 attempts over about 150 days of work prior to the ascent.

== Grade proposal ==
Bouin stated that he debated between suggesting 9b+ (5.15c) and 9c (5.15d) before proposing 9c (5.15d), describing it as a proposal that would require repeat attempts to confirm or adjust. PlanetMountain noted that other top-end routes have seen grades revised after repeat ascents, citing Bibliographie as an example.

== Route ==
PlanetMountain described DNA as approximately 55 metres long, located in the steep limestone cave of La Ramirole. UKClimbing described the route as beginning with sustained climbing (reported as around 8c (5.14b) for the initial quickdraws) into a rest, followed by multiple boulder-style cruxes (reported as around 8A and 8A+) and a difficult finish (reported as around 8c+ (5.14c)).

== Ascents and attempts ==
Date	Climber	Notes
29 April 2022	Sébastien Bouin	First ascent; proposed grade 9c (5.15d).
November 2022 (reported March 2023)	Jakob Schubert	Attempted the route and reported progress without a complete ascent.
2024 (reported December 2024)	Adam Ondra	Attempted the route; no reported ascent.
10 October 2026	Jakob Schubert	Repeated ascent

== Film ==
DNA and Bouin’s first-ascent process were featured in a Reel Rock film segment titled DNA (Reel Rock, Series 9 Episode 4), distributed online via Red Bull TV in 2023. The segment is also listed as part of the Reel Rock 17 collection on Reel Rock’s streaming platform.

== See also ==
- Silence (climb)
- List of grade milestones in rock climbing
