= Seb Bouin =

French rock climber

Sébastien Bouin
Personal information
- Nickname: Seb
- Born: 7 April 1993 (age 33) Draguignan, France
- Occupation: Professional rock climber
- Height: 180 cm (5 ft 11 in)
- Weight: 69 kg (152 lb)
- Website: Seb Bouin

Climbing career
- Type of climber: Sport climbing; Bouldering
- Highest grade: Redpoint: 9c (5.15d); Bouldering: 8C (V15)
- First ascents: DNA (9c, 2022); Suprême Jumbo Love (9b+, 2022); Nordic Marathon (9b/9b+, 2022); Beyond Integral (9b/9b+, 2020); La Rage d'Adam (9b/9b+, 2019); The Dream (9b, 2019)
- Known for: The Vintage Rock Tour historical series
- Updated on 19 November 2022

Sébastien Bouin (born 7 April 1993) is a French rock climber born in Draguignan. By 2022, Bouin is regarded as one of the strongest sport climbers in the world, being only the second-ever climber to establish a route graded 9c (5.15d), with DNA in 2022, and one of only a handful of climbers to create a new route at the grade of 9b+ (5.15c). Bouin is also regarded for his documentary series on the history of extreme sport climbing in France.

== Climbing career ==
=== Sport climbing ===
Seb Bouin started sport climbing at 11 with his mother Claire. He did his first 8a at 13, first 8b at 14, first 8c at 15, and his first 9a (5.14d) at 17. Unlike other leading climbers, Bouin avoided the indoor climbing competition circuit, focusing solely on finding "mega lines" on outdoor crags, which he described as his sole motivation. By 2012–13, at age 20, Bouin was starting to climb routes at 5.15 (9a/9a+) (e.g. Tierra Negra 9a/9a+, La Modone 9a+), and over the next few years would repeat the major 9a+ (5.15a) test pieces, including: La Rambla (2017), Papichulo (2019), and Realization/Biographie (2020). During this period, Bouin came to international prominence with the third ascent of the controversial route Chilam Balam (2015), considered 9b (5.15b) at the time, but which Bouin downgraded.

Bouin climbed his first confirmed 9b (5.15b) in 2019 with the first repeat of Adam Ondra's Mamichula, and in that same year climbed his first 9b/9b+ with the first repeat of Ondra's Move (which Bouin felt was 9b+); Ondra called Bouin "one of my favorite climbing partners". Bouin would continue in 2019 to – as UK Climbing noted – "tick more 9th Dimension climbs than any other climber on earth", including the first ascent of Albania's hardest sport climb, The Dream (9b), and the first ascent of France's hardest sport climb, La Rage d'Adam (9b/9b+) at La Ramirole cave in the Verdon Gorge.

2022 would be another strong year for Bouin putting up three major new routes, starting off with DNA in the Verdon Gorge (France), which Bouin proposed at 9c (5.15d), only the world's second-ever route at that grade after Ondra's Silence. Bouin followed with two other first ascents, the enormous 430-foot (130 m) single-pitch Nordic Marathon 9b/9b+ in Flatanger Municipality (Climbing called it "the biggest single pitch of hard climbing ever done"), and the first 9b+ (5.15c) in North America, Suprême Jumbo Love (a direct start to Chris Sharma's historic 9b route). Bouin also repeated some of the world's other hardest climbs including Change (9b+ in Norway, third ascent), and Jumbo Love (9b in the USA, fourth ascent).

=== Documentary series ===
Bouin is also regarded for his love of French extreme sport climbing history, and his The Vintage Rock Tour documentary series revisits some of the most important – and controversial – moments in French extreme sport climbing. French 1980s climbing legend Antoine Le Menestrel features in the series, and said of Bouin: "Seb doesn't consume climbing, he is a part of its evolution. He respects history and is adding his signature as a climber." The series came to international prominence in episode 4, when Bouin repeated Fred Rouhling's controversial 1990s routes of Hugh, Akira and L'autre côté du Ciel. In a follow-up series, Hidden Gems, Bouin travels to smaller French crags to meet with local climbers and put up new test-pieces.

== Personal life ==
Bouin climbs regularly with his mother Claire Cerisier (who in 2019 was climbing at 8b), including going on sponsored expeditions to Turkey, and belaying him during his development of DNA. In a 2020 interview with UK Climbing, Bouin said that his mother was a major influence on his climbing development and his overall approach to life and facing adversity and challenge.

In the same interview, Bouin said he completed his studies and become a fully qualified French state physical education teacher to have a fall-back saying: "There is less pressure knowing I have a career to fall back on in time which means I can enjoy my climbing 100%".

== Notable ascents ==
=== Redpointed routes ===
9c (5.15d):

- DNA – La Ramirole, Verdon Gorge (FRA) – 29 April 2022. First Ascent. Second 9c in history (after Silence). Bouin worked the 50-metre (160 ft) route for 150 days.

9b+ (5.15c):

- Bibliographie – Céüse (FRA) – 6 June 2023. Fourth ascent of the fifth-ever climb in history (once considered a potential first 9c) to be graded at 9b+ (5.15c).

- Suprême Jumbo Love – Clark Mountain (US) – 1 November 2022. First Ascent and direct start to Jumbo Love; first-ever 5.15c (9b+) route in North America, and the 6th 9b+ in history.
- Change – Flatanger (NOR) – 5 August 2022. Third ascent of the world's first-ever 9b+ route that was first climbed by Adam Ondra in 2012; Bouin felt a kneebar enabled by the use of a knee pad made it 9b/9b+ (5.15b/c).

9b/9b+ (5.15b/c):

- Nordic Marathon – Flatanger (NOR) – 21 July 2022. First Ascent of a very long 430-foot (130 m) single-pitch route; Climbing called it "the biggest single pitch of hard climbing ever done".
- Beyond Integral – North Face, Pic Saint-Loup (FRA) – 22 October 2020. First Ascent. The 50-metre (160 ft) route was bolted by Fedric Ferraro.
- La Rage d'Adam – La Ramirole, Verdon Gorge (FRA) – 4 September 2019. First Ascent; hardest sport climb in France that was previously tried by Adam Ondra who felt the grade could be 9b+.
- Move – Flatanger (NOR) – 6 June 2019. First repeat of Adam Ondra's 2013 route (Bouin belayed Ondra); Bouin felt Move was harder than Change and should be 9b+ (5.15c).

9b (5.15b):

- Jumbo Love – Clark Mountain (USA) – 19 October 2022. 4th ascent of the world's first-ever confirmed 9b route. First ascent was by Chris Sharma in 2008.
- Iron Curtain – Flatanger (NOR) – 11 July 2022. First repeat of Adam Ondra's 2013 route (belayed by Bouin).
- The Dream – Brar crag, Tirana (Albania) – 12 December 2019. First Ascent. Hardest climb in Albania in the crag that was described by Adam Ondra as "the best Tufa climbing I have ever seen".
- Mamichula – Oliana (ESP) – 31 July 2019. First repeat of Adam Ondra's 2017 route.

9a+/9b (5.15a/b):

- Les yeux plus gros que l'antre (translation: Eyes bigger than the cave) – Russan crag, Pont St Nicholas-Seynes (FRA) – 11 May 2018. First ascent. The 70-metre (230 ft) route was bolted over 20 years previously but had defeated all prior attempts and became an "open project"; Bouin called it the "French Chilam Balam".
- Chilam Balam – Villanueva del Rosario (ESP) – May 2015. Third ascent. A controversial route that in 2003 was proposed as the world's first-ever 9b+ (5.15c) by Bernabé Fernández after his first ascent, only to be downgraded in 2011 by Adam Ondra to 9b (5.15b) on the first repeat, and further downgraded by subsequent repeats.

Selected 9a+ (5.15a):

- Realization/Biographie – Céüse (FRA) – 13 June 2020. Bouin completed the 19th ascent of the famous 9a+ (5.15a) test piece.
- Papichulo – Oliana (ESP) – April 2019. Repeat ascent of Chris Sharma's 2008 test piece.
- Pachamama – Oliana (ESP) – March 2019. 8th ascent of Chris Sharma's 2009 test piece.
- La Côte d’Usure – La Ramirole, Verdon Gorge (FRA) – 1 October 2018. First Ascent. Bolted by Bouin when he was 16 years old, he regards it as one of his "Mega Lines".
- La Rambla – Siurana (ESP) – 6 December 2017. Bouin completed the 20th ascent of the famous 9a+ (5.15a) test piece.
- La Modone – Luberon (FRA) – May 2012. First repeat of Gérôme Pouvreau's 2011 route; Bouin's first-ever 9a+ (5.15a) route.

== See also ==
- List of grade milestones in rock climbing
- History of rock climbing
- Jorge Díaz-Rullo
