= Jumbo Love =

Sport climbing route in the US

- Suprême Jumbo Love (Jumbo Love Direct)
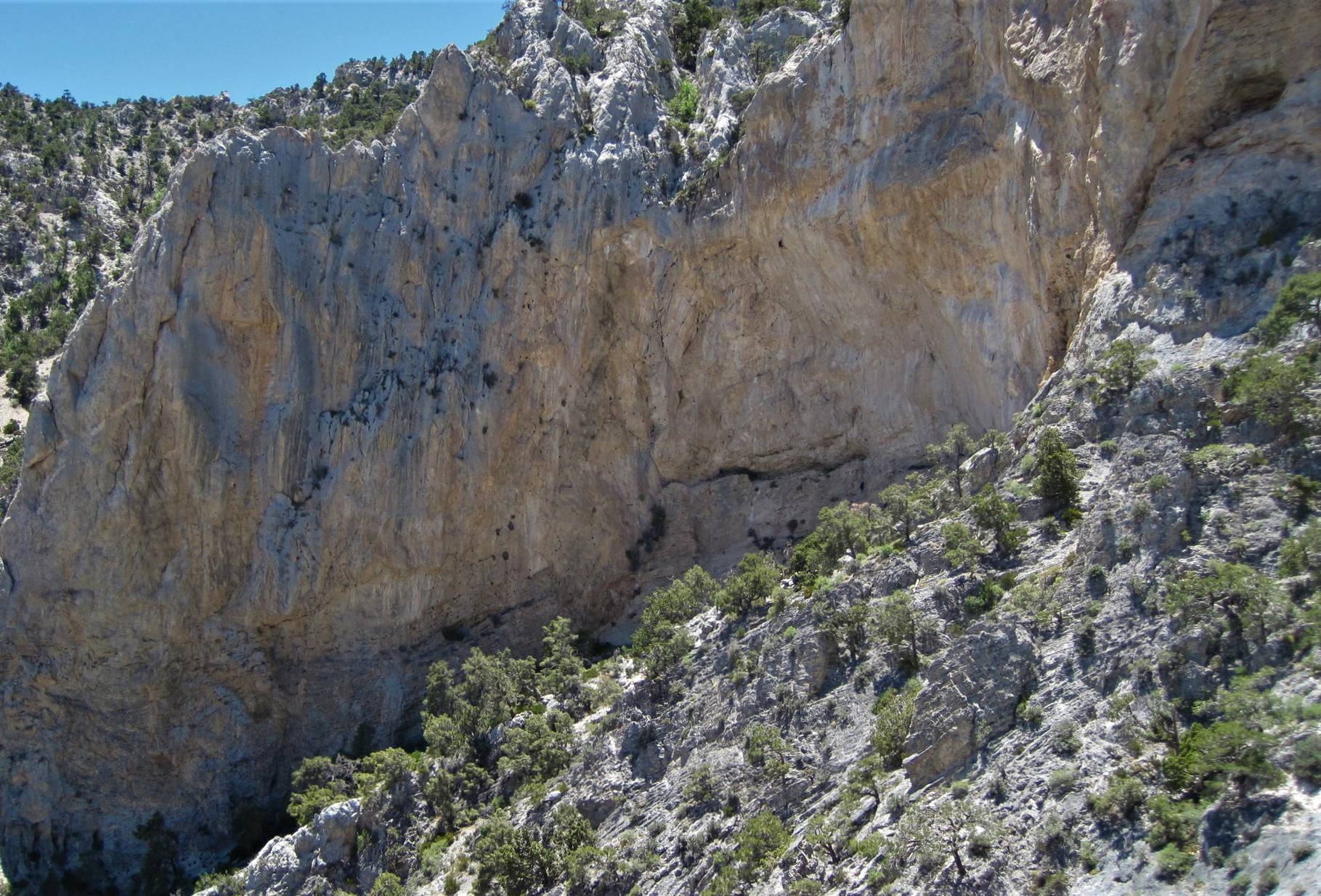
- 3rd Tier crag on Clark Mountain. Jumbo Love is on the lighter-coloured overhanging walls, centre-right.

- Location within California
- Location: Clark Mountain, Mojave Desert, California, US
- Coordinates: 35.5275°N 115.609°W
- Climbing area: 3rd Tier (Clark Mountain)
- Route type: Sport climbing; Face climbing
- Rock type: Limestone
- Vertical gain: 76-metre (249 ft)
- Pitches: 1
- Technical grade: Jumbo Love 9b (5.15b); Supreme Jumbo Love 9b+ (5.15c)
- Bolted by: Randy Leavitt (1990s)
- First free ascent: Jumbo Love, Chris Sharma, September 11, 2008; Supreme Jumbo Love, Seb Bouin, November 1, 2022
- Known for: First-ever consensus 9b (5.15b) in history

Jumbo Love is a very long 76-metre (249 ft) sport climbing route, on remote limestone cliffs on Clark Mountain in the Mojave Desert. Bolted by American climber Randy Leavitt in the 1990s, he invited Chris Sharma to attempt it in 2007. When Sharma completed the first free ascent on September 11, 2008, the route became the first-ever rock climb in history to have a confirmed grade of 9b (5.15b), and it remains an important route in the history of rock climbing.

The route has been repeated, and its grade confirmed, by a number of subsequent climbers, including French climber Seb Bouin, who made the fourth ascent on October 25, 2022. Bouin followed up his ascent by adding a direct start to the route on November 1, 2022, to create a route called Suprême Jumbo Love, which at 9b+ (5.15c) was at that time North America's hardest rock climbing route and only the sixth-ever 9b+ sport-climbing route in history.

== History ==
The route was bolted by American Randy Leavitt in the late 1990s, who envisaged it being a 3-pitch climb. Leavitt failed to complete the route and invited Chris Sharma to try it. Sharma spent 2007 with fellow American climber Ethan Pringle working the route, which Sharma envisioned as a huge 76-metre (249 ft) long single-pitch climb. In 2008, Pringle was injured and Sharma, living below the cliff (the "Third Tier" crag) for weeks, made the first ascent on September 11, 2008. Sharma named the route Jumbo Love in recognition of Leavitt's neighboring route, Jumbo Pumping Hate.

At the time of Sharma's ascent, Jumbo Love was one of several sport climbing routes that were proposed at the grade of 9b (5.15b). Fred Rouhling's controversial 1995 route, Akira, was downgraded to 9a after its first repeat by Seb Bouin in 2020. Bernabe Fernandez's equally controversial 2003 route, Chilam Balam, was later downgraded to 9a+/b after repeats by Adam Ondra and Bouin. Tommy Caldwell's 2003 route, Flex Luthor, always had caveats due to the extreme level of rock erosion (including from Caldwell himself), and was regraded to 9a+ (5.15a) by Jonathan Siegrist in 2022. Dani Andrada's 2007 route, Ali Hulk Sit Start Extension, was downgraded to 9a+/b by Alex Garriga in 2021, and further downgraded to 9a by Dani Moreno in 2023. Andrada's September 2008 route, Delincuente Natural, was also downgraded to 9a on its first repeat by Jonathan Flor in 2021.

Sharma was the only rock climber of this "first potential 9b" group that would go on to climb further consensus 9b-graded sport-climbing routes in his climbing career, which he did with Golpe de Estado (2008), and Neanderthal (2009); Sharma also went on to climb at 9b+ (5.15c) with La Dura Dura in 2013. Rouhling, Fernandez, Andrada, or Caldwell, would not climb another route with a claim of being at, or above, the grade of 9b in their careers.

The first repeat of Jumbo Love was completed almost seven years later by Ethan Pringle on May 17, 2015; his climb (and Sharma's 2008 ascent) was captured in the 2016 Reel Rock documentary film Reel Rock: Jumbo Love. American climber Jonathan Siegrist completed the third ascent on May 17, 2018, and French climber Seb Bouin made the fourth ascent on October 25, 2022. Despite being able to use kneepads, Bouin felt the 9b grade was unaffected, saying: "Jumbo Love is not just a hard line, it's a whole adventure"; at the time, Bouin had climbed 9b/9b+ and 9b+

=== Suprême Jumbo Love ===
From 2010 to 2013, Sharma tried to add a direct start to Jumbo Love but ended up eventually abandoning the project; Leavitt told Climbing that the direct start could create a new route that was closer to grade 5.15c (9b+). After completing the fourth ascent of Jumbo Love, Seb Bouin immediately began working on the direct start, which he named Suprême Jumbo Love. He completed the first ascent on November 1, 2022, with a proposed grade of 9b+ (5.15c). Bouin described his direct start as 20 metres (66 ft) of 9a (5.14d) climbing that links to Jumbo Love before its crux. Suprême Jumbo Love was the first-ever 9b+ in North America, and the sixth 9b+ in history. Leavitt was present at Bouin's ascent.

== Legacy ==
In the 2016 Reel Rock documentary on Jumbo Love, the first ascent was described as a "watershed moment" in sport climbing; Pringle expressed his own deflation at not being able to make the first ascent and noted that "when Chris ascended Jumbo Love, it really elevated his rock-star status". When Seb Bouin made the fourth ascent in 2022, he said, "This king line has attracted me for a long time. It was a true inspiration to see the footage of Chris Sharma on it. I started climbing around 2005 and it was one of the most incredible climbing films I had watched at that time".

Sharma said that after Jumbo Love he had to change his approach. His past breakthroughs had been on routes established and bolted by other climbers who had given up on them. In a 2013 interview with Rock & Ice he said: "I wanted to push myself to the next level. Where is that? I had to discover it. That was a big process in itself. So I bolted all these routes [in Spain]. And a lot of them ended up being that next level". The culmination of that process would be Sharma and Adam Ondra's development and completion of La Dura Dura, the world's second-ever 9b+ (5.15c) in 2013.

== Ascents ==
Jumbo Love has been ascended by:

- 1st Chris Sharma, September 11, 2008
- 2nd Ethan Pringle, May 17, 2015
- 3rd Jonathan Siegrist, May 17, 2018
- 4th Seb Bouin, October 25, 2022

Suprême Jumbo Love has been ascended by:

- 1st Seb Bouin, November 1, 2022

== Filmography ==
- Includes Chris Sharma's 2008 ascent: Josh Lowell, Brett Lowell, Cooper Roberts (2009). Reel Rock: Progression (Motion picture). Big UP Productions.
- Ethan Pringle's 2015 repeat: Zachary Barr, Peter Mortimer, Nick Rosen (2016). Reel Rock: Jumbo Love (Motion picture). Sender Films.

== See also ==
- History of rock climbing
- List of grade milestones in rock climbing
- Silence, first climb in the world with a potential grade of 9c (5.15d)
- La Dura Dura, second climb in the world to be graded 9b+ (5.15c)
- Realization/Biographie, first climb in the world with a consensus grade of 9a+ (5.15a)
- Action Directe, first climb in the world with a consensus grade of 9a (5.14d)
- Hubble, first climb in the world with a consensus grade of 8c+ (5.14c)
