= Hubble (climb) =

Sport climbing route in England

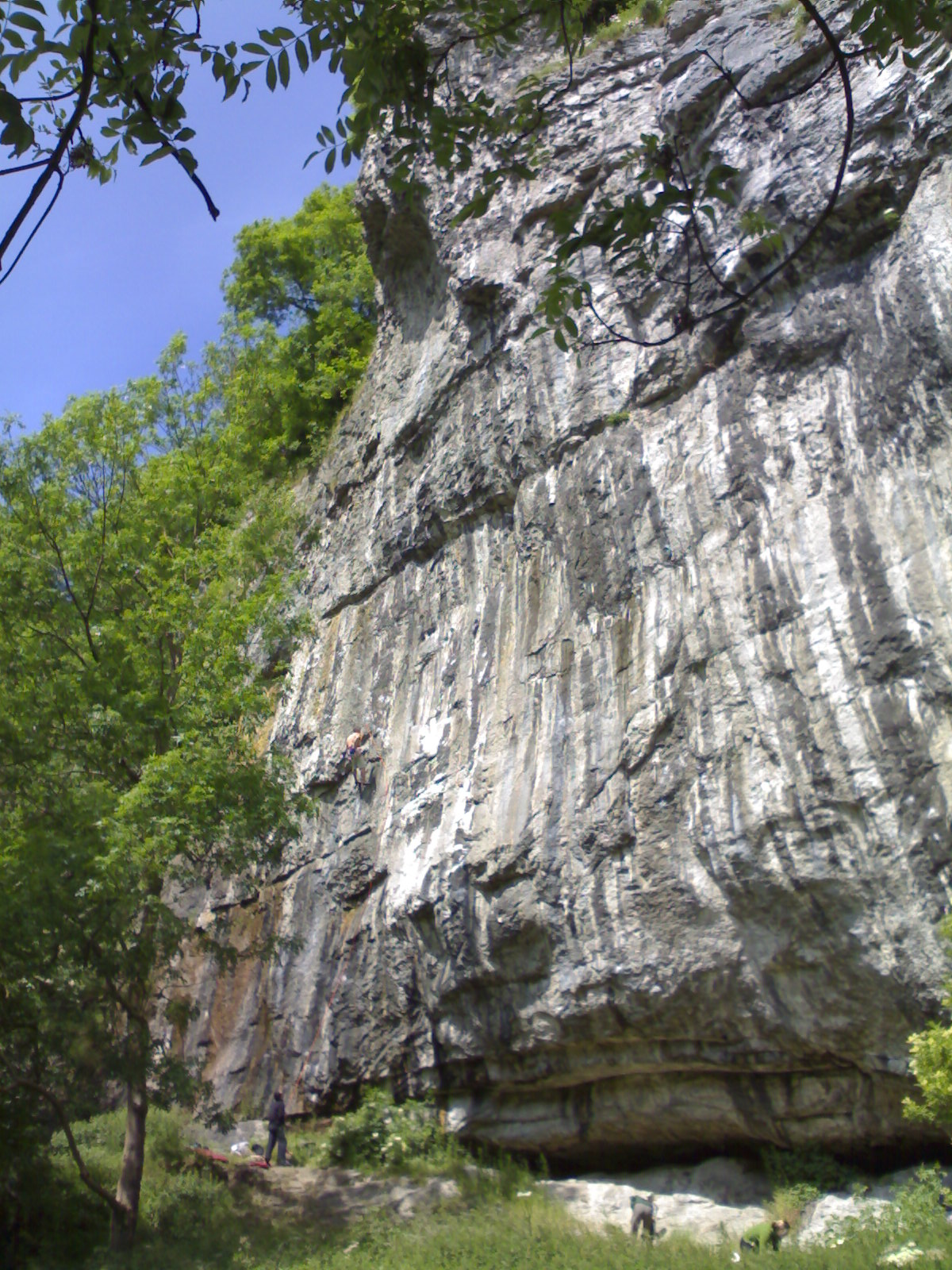
- Raven Tor crag, Miller's Dale; Hubble starts at the left side of the cave below the centre of the wall.

- Location within England
- Location: Derbyshire, Peak District, England
- Coordinates: 53°15′20″N 1°46′33″W
- Climbing area: Raven Tor, Miller's Dale.
- Route type: Sport climbing; Overhang climbing
- Rock type: Limestone
- Vertical gain: 10 metres (33 ft)
- Pitches: 1
- Technical grade: 8c+ (5.14c) (French); E9 7b (British)
- First free ascent: Ben Moon, on 14 June 1990
- Known for: First-ever consensus 8c+ (5.14c) in history

Hubble is a short 10-metre (33 ft) bolted sport climb at the limestone crag of Raven Tor in Millers Dale, in the Peak District in Derbyshire, England. When Hubble was first redpointed by English climber Ben Moon on 14 June 1990, it became the first-ever climb in the world to have a consensus climbing grade of 8c+ (5.14c); and the highest grade in the English system at E9 7b.

== History ==
Hubble was an aid climbing practice route that used skyhooks to pass the first two bolts, which English climbers Ben Moon and Jerry Moffatt started working on in 1989. Moon and Moffatt had returned from a summer in France establishing some of the hardest sport climbing routes in the world on the limestone walls of Buoux, including Agincourt and Maginot Line, both at 8c (5.14b); they wanted to set these new grade standards at home. Moon rebuilt the individual moves of Hubble in his basement and practiced them with Moffatt, in particular using a new device called a "Moon Board", which was not dissimilar to Wolfgang Gullich's new campus board training device.

Moon spent eight straight days completing the first redpoint of the route, which he did on 14 June 1990, on one of the rare occasions when the route was completely dry. Moon later said, "The year before, I had already redpointed a couple of 8c's in France. I already knew that Hubble was more difficult than all my hardest lines like Agincourt or Maginot Line. That’s why I rated it E9/7b. It was the first route in Great Britain that was given a 7b as technical difficulty". Moon also said that Moffatt had come close to redpointing it earlier, but lost interest when Moon completed it. Hubble is widely regarded as the world's first consensus 8c+ (5.14c) climbing route.

=== First 9a ===
Climbers have speculated whether Hubble was actually the world's first-ever sport climb at grade 9a (5.14d), instead of Wolfgang Güllich's 1991 ascent of Action Directe, which is considered the first – and is still the "benchmark" – for the 9a (5.14d) grade.

German Alex Megos is one of the few, with British climber Buster Martin, who have climbed Hubble and Action Directe; he felt Hubble was very short and probably an 8c+ (5.14c) in the right conditions (i.e. fully dry), although Megos caveated that grading is not an exact science and is subject to the climber's style and preferences. Czech climber Adam Ondra had a brief attempt at Hubble when conditions were not perfect (the route is usually damp) and said: "Personally, I would like to see the impressive Action Directe as the first 9a, nevertheless, when I consider it objectively, the first one is in fact Hubble, that’s a pity because it’s quite short and slimy".

The short nature of the route had led some, including Moon himself, to describe Hubble as "bouldering on a rope", and speculated that the short 4-move crux makes Hubble really a bouldering problem with a circa 8B/8B+ bouldering grade. Ondra himself said, "Maybe it would be more accurate to label the route as an 8B+ (V14) bouldering problem; that would make it the first 8B+ in the world – 10 years before the one that we consider to be the first today [Ondra was referring to the bouldering route, Dreamtime, by Fred Nicole from 2000; although Nicole's Radja from 1996 is now considered the first 8B+ (V14) boulder route]".

The later discovery of the possibility of a kneebar rest at the crux is considered to have also likely softened Hubble's grade to its original grade of 8c+ (5.14c).

== Route ==
Hubble is described as starting from a big flake, after which most climbers reach for a large pinch hold. Shorter climbers can use an intermediate hold and a foothold to get the pinch. From the pinch, the climber reaches right to an undercut, moves their feet above a lip in a high step while bringing the left hand into a two-finger pocket undercut.

Then comes the circa 8B/8B+ bouldering crux move, for which the climber slaps right for a slopy crimp, then to a large pinch, and then an undercut crimp. There is another high step to bring the feet above another lip and slap for a rough crimp. This is the 4-move bouldering crux section of the route, after which is a 7c (5.12d) section to finish.

More recent ascents of Hubble (e.g Matthew Wright and Buster Martin in 2020), have seen some climbers use a kneebar short rest – a modern sport climbing technique – at the crux section that can soften the difficulty slightly, although still maintaining the route at a consensus 8c+ (5.14c) level.

== Ascents ==
Hubble has been ascended by:

- 1st. Ben Moon, 14 June 1990
- 2nd. Malcolm Smith, 1992
- 3rd. John Gaskins, 1994
- 4th. Steve Dunning, 2009
- 5th. Richard Simpson (disputed), 2005
- 6th. Steve McClure, 2009
- 7th. Alexander Megos, 31 May 2016
- 8th. William Bosi, 2016
- 9th. Pete Dawson, 2019
- 10th. Mathew Wright, 2 October 2020
- 11th. Buster Martin, 13 October 2020
- 12th. Toby Roberts, 28 October 2021

== Filmography ==
- Sean McColl's 2014 inspection: Falquet, Nicolas (director) (2014). Rock Climbing Classics: Episode 6 – Hubble 8c+ (Motion picture). Mammut.
- Alex Megos's 2016 ascent: Kretschmann, Frank (director) (2016). Alex Megos Formula: Episode 3 – Gravity (Motion picture). Red Bull.

== See also ==
- History of rock climbing
- List of grade milestones in rock climbing
- Silence, first climb in the world with a potential grade of 9c (5.15d)
- La Dura Dura, second climb in the world with a consensus grade of 9b+ (5.15c)
- Jumbo Love, first climb in the world with a consensus grade of 9b (5.15b)
- Realization/Biographie, first climb in the world with a consensus grade of 9a+ (5.15a)
- Action Directe, first climb in the world with a consensus grade of 9a (5.14d)
