= Jerry Moffatt =

British rock climber

Personal information
- Nationality: British
- Born: 18 May 1963 (age 63) Leicester, England
- Education: St David's College
- Occupation: Professional rock climber
- Height: 5 ft 11 in (180 cm)
- Weight: 10 st (140 lb; 64 kg)
- Spouse: Sharon Wallace (m.2003)

Climbing career
- Type of climber: Sport climbing; Traditional climbing; Bouldering; Free Solo; Competition climbing
- Highest grade: Redpoint: 8c+ (5.14c); Onsight/Flash: 8a+ (5.13c); Bouldering: 8B (V13); Free solo: E6 6b ~7b (5.12b)
- First ascents: Ulysees' Bow (E6 6b, '83); Master's Wall (E7 6b, (Note: In 2018, James 'Caff' McHaffie, repeated Master's Wall (2nd person to do so after Leo Houlding in 1996), and said of it: "'I'd done more than 200 routes of E7-9 [including Indian Face in 2013] and this bastard felt amongst the most serious few leads I'd ever done", and "From reading into Jerry's account of his ascent I'm pretty sure this is where he went and I'll just throw it out there and say I think he did an E9 in 1983".) '83); Masterclass (8a, '83); Revelations (8a+, (Note: A hold would later break off on Revelations which defied attempts to repair it; it is now an 8b sport route.) '84); Superman (8B/V13, '88); Evolution (8c+, '95)
- Major ascents: The Face (8a+, '83); Liquid Ambar (8c+, '90); The Dominator (8B/V13, '93)
- Retired from competition: Sept 1990
- Known for: First to climb 8a+, 8c+ (sport); First to on-sight 7b+, 7c, 7c+ (sport); One of first to climb 8A+, 8B (bouldering)
Medal record
Men's competition climbing
Representing United Kingdom
IFSC Climbing World Cup
Bronze medal – third place	1989	Lead
Sport Roccia
Silver medal – second place	1989	Lead
- Updated on 16 January 2022

Jerry Moffatt (born 18 March 1963) is a British rock climber and climbing author who is widely considered as being the best British rock climber from the early-1980s to the early-1990s, and was arguably the best rock climber in the world in the mid-1980s, and an important climber in the history of the sport.

As a sport climber, Moffatt was one of the first climbers in history to onsight routes of grade 7b+ (5.12c), 7c (5.12d), and 7c+ (5.13a), and also the first in history to climb routes of grade 8a+ (5.13c), and probably 8c+ (5.14c). (Note: The consensus first 8c+ is Ben Moon's Hubble which was climbed a month later in June 1990; however, Hubble is also potentially a candidate for re-grading to 9a, which would make it the world's first 9a over the exiting consensus candidate of Action Directe, which was climbed in 1991.) As a competition climber, Moffatt won several of the nascent tour events, and retired ranked first in the world. As a boulder climber, Moffatt was one of the first-ever to solve problems of boulder grade 8A+ (V12), and 8B (V13). As a traditional climber, Moffatt established some of the most intimidating routes at the time in Britain, which are still rarely repeated, and in particular, the Master's Wall (E7 6b) in 1983.

Moffatt was noted for the intensity of his training, and the co-development of training techniques now considered mainstream in professional climbing. In 1991, Moffatt opened Britain's first indoor climbing centre, "The Foundry" in Sheffield. He has written books on mental preparation for competition climbing.

== Climbing career ==
=== Routes ===
On leaving school in 1980, aged 17, Moffatt began to immediately attract attention in the British rock climbing media with repeat ascents of some of the hardest British traditional climbing routes, most notably Ron Fawcett's Strawberries (E7 6b). Moffatt described Fawcett as a "massive legend", but that "by 1983, I was pretty sure I was climbing better than him in terms of difficulty. I looked up to him though and we never had any problems". Aged 18, and living in an abandoned shed at Stoney Middleton crag, Moffatt started to establish his own test-pieces such as Little Plum (E6 6c, in 1981–82), one of the hardest British sport climbing routes that had repelled all attempts to free it, and one of the first British 7c+/8a sport routes.

In 1982, aged 19, Moffatt travelled to the United States, where he repeated America's hardest routes, and did the world's first-ever flash of a 7b+ (5.12c) with Super Crack in Shawangunks, and Equinox in Joshua Tree. In 1983, on returning home, Moffatt established his most dangerous traditional climbing route, Master's Wall (Note: Moffatt called it "Master's Wall" in honour of British climbing pioneer Joe Brown, for whom that part of Cloggy's East Buttress was commonly referred to.) (E7 6b) at Clogwyn Du'r Arddu. In a later interview, Moffatt said, "At that time to be respected, you really had to be putting up really scary new routes. That was where it was at, in Britain at least. Master's Wall is probably where I risked most". Later that summer, Moffatt focused on sport climbing, establishing Masterclass at Pen Trwyn, the first British 8a (5.13b) route. (Note: The consensus first British 8a (5.13b) is Ben Moon's Statement of Youth in 1984, however, Moffatt's Masterclass was originally graded 7c+ (5.13a), and only later raised to 8a (5.13b). The world's first-ever 8a (5.13b) was Grand Illusion by Tony Yaniro in 1979.) In September 1983, Moffatt travelled to Germany where he did the world's second-ever onsight of a 7c (5.12d) with Heisse Finger, and then went on to climb the world's first-ever sport climb at 8a+ (5.13c), The Face, in Altmühl.

In 1984, on his 21st birthday, Moffatt flashed Chimpanzodrome at Saussois, and then did the world's first onsight of a 7c+ (5.13a) with Pol Pot at Verdon. Later in 1984, Moffatt freed Revelations at Ravens Tor in the Peak District, Britain's first 8a+ (5.13c) route. In June 1985, Moffatt did the first free ascent of the Yosemite's Lost Arrow Spire with Ron Kauk, as a live television event with an audience of over 30 million for ABC's Wide World of Sports. During 1985 to late 1986, Moffatt was largely out with a compressed nerve injury (initially mis-diagnosed as tendonitis), that required surgery and rehabilitation.

On returning in 1987, Moffatt spent the next two years repeating the three hardest 8b+ (5.14a) routes in France (Le Rage de Vivre, Le Minumum, La Spectre des Surmutant in Buoux), and in the United States (Scarface, White Wedding, To Bolt Or Not To Be in Smith Rock), while also creating his own 8b+ route, Stone Love in the Frankenjura in Germany. In May 1990, he returned to Pen Trwyn in Wales to create Liquid Ambar, Britain's first 8c (5.14b) route, and which has been regraded to 8c+ (5.14c), which would make it the world's first 8c+. Moffatt continued to travel widely, repeating Punks In The Gym 8b+ (5.14a) in 1992 in Australia, establishing Canada's first 8b (5.13d), The Big Kahuna, in 1993 in Ontario, and freeing routes such as Evolution 8c+ (5.14c) in 1995 at Ravens Tor.

=== Competitions ===
In 1989 and 1990, Moffatt concentrated on the emerging sport of competition climbing, winning ten international events over two years, and never finishing worse than fifth in any competition he entered. He won the first-ever UIAA Climbing World Cup Grand Prix event that was held in 1989 in Leeds, and finished third overall, (Note: Moffatt only attended four of the seven events of the 1989 IFSC Climbing World Cup, winning one (Leeds in Britain) and coming second in the other three (La Riba in Spain, Bardonecchia in Italy, and Lyon in France), but was therefore not capable of winning the overall 1989 competition, which was won by Simon Nadin, with Didier Raboutou finishing second.) in the inaugural 1989 IFSC Climbing World Cup that concluded in Lyon. In a 2009 interview, Moffatt noted that his initial competition form was poor until he began to study the mental side of competing, saying, "I found out how your mind works under pressure and immediately after reading that book I competed in Leeds and won my first competition". The book that Moffatt was referring to was With Winning in Mind (1988), by American Olympian, Lanny Bassham.

In September 1990, aged 27, Moffatt retired from competition climbing and at that time was rated first on the Association of Sport Climbers International (ASCI) rankings. On retiring, he was voted most prolific competition climber 1980s in the French climbing magazine Vertical. In his 2009 autobiography he said of his retirement, "I no longer had energy the energy to keep it all up. I wanted to get myself back again. I wanted to see my friends. I wanted to climb for myself. I wanted to do first ascents. Most of all I wanted to have fun".

=== Bouldering ===
Moffatt had been an early adopter of bouldering from the outset of his career, saying in a 2009 interview, "My early boulder problems weren't publicized, no one seemed to be interested in them at all". In 1988, he solved Superman at Cressbrook, one of the first-ever 8A+ (V12) boulder problems in the world. In 1991, Moffatt traveled to Yosemite and at Camp 4 solved Sick It at 8A+ (V12), and The Force at 8A (V11), two of the hardest in America at that time. He returned to Yosemite in 1993, and added The Dominator at 8B (V13), considered one of the first-ever 8B (V13) boulders ever climbed. In 1997, he climbed the 12-metre high Samson (E8 7b) at Burbage South, while technically the hardest gritstone route at that time, with boulder pads is now a highball bouldering problem at 8a (5.13b). In 2002, on Stanage Edge in the Peak District Moffatt solved the long-term boulder problem The Ace at 8B (V13), the hardest boulder problem in Britain at the time, and effectively Moffat's last major new route.

In 1996, Moffatt and climbing partner Ben Moon featured in Simon Tucker's film The Real Thing, an important early installment in the bouldering film genre. Notably, the film showcased Moffatt and Moon's novel training techniques (i.e. campus board-type installations), which have sense become mainstream. The pair would feature in other bouldering films, including Stick It (2001), and Stone Love (2001).

=== Free soloing ===
Moffatt is also known for his free soloing of challenging British traditional climbing routes, telling The Guardian in 2011, "You have to have an insane confidence in your own ability to go soloing". In 1983, Moffatt was particularly active in pushing his limits, soloing Scarab (E6 6b) at Stoney Middleton, Right Wall (E5 6a) at Dinas Cromlech, and days before he climbed Master's Wall at Clogwyn Du'r Arddu, free soloing the neighboring Great Wall (E4 6a), The Boldest (E4 5c), and Curving Arete (E4 5c). However, the death of his friend Neil Molnar, who died soloing that year, saw Moffatt scale back his soloing.

=== Writing ===
Moffatt's 2009 autobiography, Revelations, written with co-author Niall Grimes, won the Grand Prize at the 2009 Banff Mountain Book Festival, and was shortlisted for the 2009 Boardman Tasker Prize for Mountain Literature. In 2015, it was listed in Climbing magazine's "33 Must Read Climbing Books", saying, "If you ever want to be inspired to train, just read any chapter. What a hardman!".

In 2017, Moffatt completed his second book, Mastermind: Mental training for climbers, focused on sports psychology for sport climbers, and built on the methods Lanny Bassham outlined (earlier).

=== The Foundry ===
In 1991, Moffatt and Paul Reeve opened The Foundry Climbing Centre ("the Foundry"), in Sheffield, and was the first of its type in the UK with leading, top-roping, bouldering, and interchangeable holds. They were originally financially supported by Wild Country, which owned 51%, but Moffatt and Reeve later bought out Wild Country's share, and now own it equally.

== Legacy ==
Moffatt is widely considered to be the best British rock climber from the early-1980s to the early-1990s and was arguably the best rock climber in the world during the mid to late 1980s. In 2006, the BBC said: "Jerry is one of, if not the greatest climbers of all time, and his name is known and highly respected in the global world of rock climbing". In 2009, PlanetMountain called him "one of the most successful climbers in the world during the 1980s and 1990s", and "Jerry Moffatt is, in short, a climber who like few others left his lasting mark, worldwide, on the early development of this vertical game". In 2009, Jens Larssen of climbing website 8a.nu said "Jerry Moffat was probably the best climber in the world during the 1980s", while Climbing magazine called him a "world rock climbing legend". In 2011, The Guardian said of him, "That's Jerry Moffatt, once the best rock climber in the world". In 2018, Gripped said, "Moffatt was the best climber of the 1980s and early 1990s".

In a British context, Moffatt (and contemporaries such as Moon and Dawes) carried on the legacy of Peter Livesey and Ron Fawcett. However, Moffatt (and Moon) soon reached the limits of what they could safely achieve with traditional climbing, and instead followed the continental European trend into bolted sport climbing, and competition climbing. Moffatt, and Moon, were also part of a new group of climbers, that included Germans Wolfgang Güllich, Kurt Albert, and Stefan Glowacz, who were using new training techniques (e.g. campus board, plyometrics), and embracing bouldering, to materially improve their technique and the standard of routes they could climb. In 2006, Moffatt told the BBC, "When I started climbing I wanted to do dangerous climbs, in my mid-20's I wanted to do really hard climbs with ropes, and then when I got to my late-30's it got shorter and I got more obsessed with trying to do the hardest move I could possibly do... It might be just one or two moves".

== Personal life ==
Moffatt is married to his wife Sharon with whom he has two children. Outside of climbing, he is an avid surfer, a sport he took up while injured on a 1993 climbing trip to Yosemite

Moffatt was diagnosed with dyslexia at school, which led to his parents sending him to St David's College, Llandudno, a boarding school with a special programme for dyslexic children.

In April 1987, his younger brother Toby died aged 21 in the United States (in his autobiography, Moffatt says that he named his climb Liquid Ambar after the tree Liquidambar – although Moffatt spells it as two words – in memory of Toby, who was a keen gardener and wished to plant such a tree on his return to England).

== Notable ascents ==
- Mayfair (7a+) 1979 Pen Trwyn Wales, First ascent age 16 with Andy Pollitt
- Little Plum (E6 6c) Stoney Middleton 1982 first ascent
- Super Crack (5.12c, 7b+) Swanangunks, USA.1982 first flash of this grade.
- Equinox (5.12c) Joshua Tree 1983 USA flash
- Scarab (E6 6b, 7b+) Stoney Middleton – 1983 – solo
- Right Wall E5 6a, Cemetery Gates E1 5b, Ivy Sepulchre E1 5b, Left Wall E2 5c, Memory lane E3 5c, Cenotaph Corner E1 5c, Foil E3 6a 1983 All solo in a day.
- Ulysses (E6 6b) – Stanage – 1983 – First ascent, one of the last greats to be climbed.
- Void (E4 6a), Grim Wall Direct (E1 5b), The Weaver (E2 5c), Vector (E2 5c), Extraction (E2 5c), Geireagle (E3 5c) 1983 All solo in one day.
- Oyster (8a) August 1983 Pen Trwyn Wales. First ascent of world's first Sport 8a.
- Master's Wall (E7 6b) – Clogwyn Du'r Arddu – 1983
- Masterclass (8a) 1993 Pen Trwyn Wales first ascent.
- Great Wall E4 6a- The Boldest (E4 5c), Curving Arete (E4 5c) 1993 Clogwyn Du'r Arddu Wales all solo.
- Ekel (9+) 1983 First ascent and first 9+ in Germany.
- The Face (8a+) – Altmühltal – 1983 – First ascent, considered the first 8a+ (5.13c) in history.
- Heisse Finger (7c) Germany 1983 world's first 7c to be on-sighted.
- Super Imjin (7c) 1984 Japan, on-sight of country's hardest route
- Pol Pot (7c+) 1984 Verdon, world's first 7c+ to be on-sighted.
- Pappi on sight (8a) 1984 Verdon France first ascent
- The Messiah (E6 6c) 1984 Peak District first ascent, hardest gritstone route at time.
- Revelations (8b) Raven Tor – 1984 – First ascent
- Our Father (E4 6a), Kingdom Come (E5 6b), Dies Irae (E2 5c), Special K (E4 6a), Scoop Wall (E3 5c), Kelloggs (E5 6b), Wee Doris (E4 5c), Pickpocket (E4 6a) 1984 Stoney Middleton all solo in a day
- The Phoenix (5.12d) 1984 Yosemite on-sight
- Midnight Lightening (V9) 1984 Yosemite fourth ascent and first to do in a day
- Lost Arrow Spire (5.12d) 1985 Yosemite first ascent with Ron Kauk. Filmed live for Wide World Of Sport. Estimated 30 million viewers.
- Le Rage de Vivre (8b+) Buoux – 1987 – Second ascent of Antoine Le Menestrel's route (1986)
- Le Minimum (8b+) Buoux 1987 – Third ascent of Marc Le Menestrel's route (1986)
- La Spectre des Surmutant (8b+) Buoux second ascent – 1988
- Scarface (8b+), White Wedding (8b+), To Bolt Or Not To Be (8b+), 1988 first to repeat all the 8b+'s Smith Rocks U.S.A
- Stone Love (8b+) Frankenjura 1988 First ascent
- Seynes 1988 competition France 1st place
- Leeds 1989 competition England 1st place. First-ever round of World Cup
- La Riba 1989 competitions Spain 1st place equal with Simon Nadin
- Cologne 1989 competition Germany 1st place
- Madonna di Campiglio 1989 competition Italy 1st place
- Bercy 1990 competition France Paris 1st place
- Brianscon1990 competition France 1st place
- London National 1990 competition 1st place
- Maurienne Masters 1990 competition 1st place. The first multi-discipline event, red point, boulder, speed, and on-sight.
- Liquid Ambar (8c) Lower Pen Trwyn 1990 First ascent.
- Harrods Store 1991 London England Climbed the building to open sale
- Serpentine 1992 (8a) Grampians Australia on-sight in 35-degree heat
- Punks in the Gym 1992 (8b+) Arapiles repeat, 1st redpoint
- Dominator 1993 Yosemite U.S.A (8b) Boulder problem world's first 8b
- Big Kahuna 1994 Lions Head Canada (8B) First ascent, Canada's hardest route at the time
- Evolution (8c+) Raven Tor 1995 First ascent.
- Progress (8c+) Kilnsey U.K 1995 First ascent
- Seans Roof 1995 (8c) Blackwell Dale U.K first ascent
- Nelsons Column 1996 London England 4th ascent
- Samson 1997 (E8 7b) Burbage South UK First ascent, hardest gritstone route at the time
- The Ace (8B) Stanage 2002 First ascent

== Bibliography ==
- Moffatt, Jerry; Grimes, Niall (2009). Jerry Moffatt : revelations. Sheffield: Vertebrate Pub. ISBN 978-1-906148-11-9. OCLC 429983846.
- Moffat, Jerry (2019). Mastermind : mental training for climbers. Vertebrate Publishing. ISBN 978-1-912560-96-7. OCLC 1127750870.

== Filmography ==
- Documentary on 1980s British sport climbing: Brown, Nick (director) (2019). Statement of Youth: The birth of modern climbing (Motion picture). UKC.
- Documentary on Moffatt, Ben Moon and Malcolm Smith bouldering in Cresciano: Heap, Richard (director) (2001). Stone Love (Motion picture). Slackjaw Film.
- Documentary on British bouldering: Pritchard, Ben (director) (2001). Stick It (Motion picture). Slackjaw Film. ASIN B000K2Y798.
- Documentary on the hardest gritstone routes in Peak District: Heap, Richard (director) (1998). Hard Grit (Motion picture). Slackjaw Film. ASIN B000VY46PU.
- Documentary on Moffatt and Ben Moon bouldering: Tucker, Simon (director) (1996). The Real Thing (Motion picture). positive Power Productions. ASIN B005S22DIW.
- Documentary on Moffatt, Johnny Dawes, Ben Moon: Hughes, Alun (director) (1988). 80s Birth of Extreme (Motion picture). Hughes Film. ASIN B00H7ATIW2.
- Documentary on Moffatt and Ron Kauk on the FFA of Lost Arrow Spire: Lost Arrow Spire (Motion picture). American Broadcasting Company. 1985.

== See also ==
- List of grade milestones in rock climbing
- History of rock climbing
- Patrick Edlinger, French sport climber
- Steve McClure, British sport climber
