= Malcolm Smith (climber) =

British rock climber

Personal information
- Nationality: British
- Born: 1973 (age 52–53) Dunbar, Scotland
- Height: 178 cm (5 ft 10 in)

Climbing career
- Type of climber: Sport climbing, bouldering
- Highest grade: Redpoint: 9a (5.14d); Bouldering: 8B+ (V14)
Medal record
IFSC Climbing World Cup
Winner	2002	Bouldering
- Updated on May 2014

Malcolm Smith (born 1973, Dunbar, Scotland) is a Scottish rock climber and competition climber who won the bouldering IFSC Climbing World Cup in 2002.

Smith is known for training regimes in his bouldering and Sport Climbing. He is one of only a handful of climbers to have repeated Fred Nicole's boulder problem, Dreamtime V14 (8B+) at Cresciano, and has made first ascents of boulder problems up to 8B+ (V14), such as Monk Life in Northumberland, and Pilgrimage at Parisella's Cave in North Wales. Smith has also competed internationally in bouldering competitions, winning the 2002 IFSC Climbing World Cup.

As an accomplished sport climber he repeated many of the UK's sport routes in the 1990s and made the first successful ascent of Scotlands first F9a, Hunger, in 2010.

When he was aged 18, in 1992 he repeated Ben Moon's sport climbing route Hubble, at Raven Tor. He started climbing in 1988.

He is the brother of Scottish visual artist Sandy Smith.

== Filmography ==
- Documentary on Smith's training techniques: Heap, Richard (director) (2006). Splinter (Motion picture). Slackjaw Film.
- Documentary on Smith, Jerry Moffatt, and Ben Moon bouldering in Cresciano: Heap, Richard (director) (2001). Stone Love (Motion picture). Slackjaw Film.
- Documentary on British bouldering: Pritchard, Ben (director) (2001). Stick It (Motion picture). Slackjaw Film. ASIN B000K2Y798.

== Notable ascents ==
First ascents unless otherwise stated.

=== Routes ===
1991 Magnetic Fields, F8b, Malham Cove. Repeat.

1992 Hubble, F8c+, Raven Tor. Second ascent. Now sometimes considered F9a, which would make Malcolm the 3rd man ever to climb F9a.

1993 Steall Appeal, F8b, Steall Hut Crag.

1994 Transcendence, E8 6c, Back Bowden Doors.

1994 Cry Freedom, F8b+, Malham Cove, repeat

1994 Bat Route, F8b+, Malham Cove, repeat

1995 Progress, F8c+, Kilnsey, second ascent

1995 Evolution, F8c+, Ravenstor, second ascent

2000 Transform, F8c, Malham Cove.

2007 Black Out, F8b, The Anvil.

2007 The Smiddy, F8b+, The Anvil.

2008 Unjustified, F8c, Malham Cove. Repeat.

2010 Blood Diamond, F8c+, The Anvil.

2010 Hunger, F9a, The Anvil. Scotland's first F9a.

=== Bouldering ===
1994 Lothlorian, Font 8b, Kyloe-in-the-woods. A traverse, similar to a F9a sport route in terms of endurance.

1994 Leviathan, Font 8b+, Kyloe-in-the-woods. A traverse, similar to a F9a or a F9a+ sport route in terms of endurance.

2001 Eight Ball, Font 8b, Gardoms Edge. Second or third ascent.

2001 Careless Torque, Font 8a+, Stanage Plantation. Second ascent.

2001 The Ace, Font 8b, Stanage Plantation. Second ascent

2003 Monk Life, Font 8b+, Kyloe-in-the-woods.

2004 Pilgrimage, Font 8b+, Parisella's Cave.

2004 Dreamtime, Font 8c, Cresciano. Some give it Font 8b+.

2005 Supersize Me, Font 8b, Dumbarton Rock.

2007 The Serum of Sisyphus, Font 8a+, Dumbarton Rock.

2008 Gut buster, Font 8b+, Dumbarton Rock. Scotlands first Font 8b+.

2010 Grande Tour, Font 8b, Dumbarton Rock (possibly Font 8b+, adds a hard finish to the bulk of Perfect Crime Extension).

2010 Firefight, Font 8b, Dumbarton Rock. Sent on same day as Grande Tour.

2010 Le Saboteur, Font 8a+, Dumbarton Rock.

2010 Perfect Crime Extension, Font 8b, Dumbarton Rock.

== See also ==
- List of grade milestones in rock climbing
- History of rock climbing
- Rankings of most career IFSC gold medals
