= Action Directe (climb) =

Sport climbing route in Germany

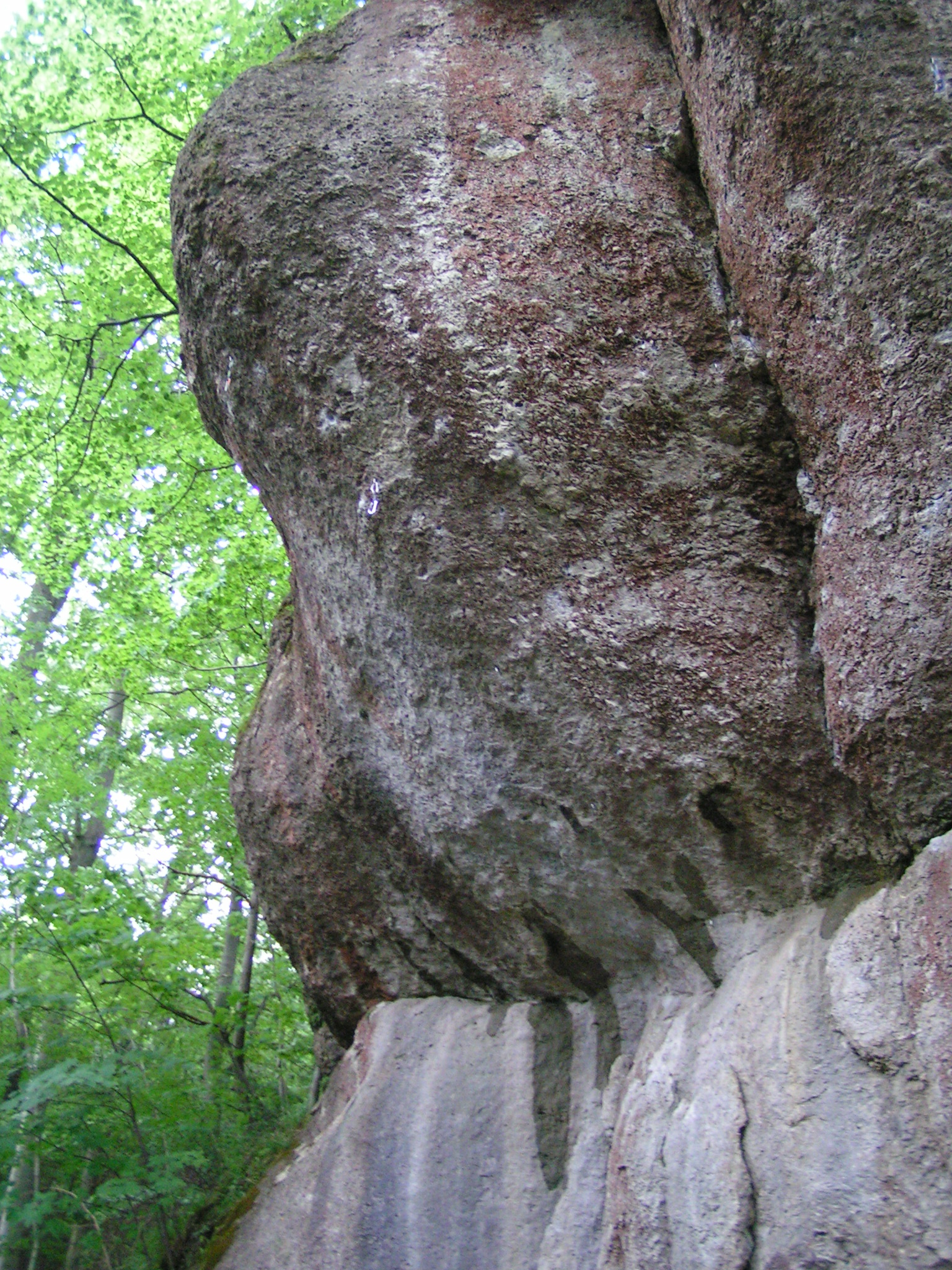
- The route follows five bolts that are visible on the photo (quickdraws are clipped to the fourth and fifth bolt) and ends with the belay anchor (not visible).

- Location within Germany
- Location: Frankenjura, Germany
- Coordinates: 49°38′04″N 11°36′09″E
- Climbing area: Waldkopf crag, Krottenseer Forst
- Route type: Sport climbing; Overhang climbing
- Rock type: Limestone
- Vertical gain: 15-metre (49 ft)
- Pitches: 1
- Technical grade: 9a (French), XI (UIAA), or 5.14d (YDS)
- Bolted by: Milan Sykora
- First free ascent: Wolfgang Güllich, 14 September 1991
- First female free ascent: Mélissa Le Nevé, 22 May 2020
- Known for: First-ever consensus 9a (5.14d) in history

Action Directe (French: [aksjɔ̃ diʁɛkt]) is a short 15-metre (49 ft) overhanging sport-climb at the limestone Waldkopf crag in Frankenjura, Germany. When it was first climbed by German climber Wolfgang Güllich in 1991, it became the first climb in the world to have a consensus 9a (5.14d) grade. (Note: Some climbers have speculated whether English climber Ben Moon's 1990 ascent of the even shorter Hubble, with only 4 crux moves, was the world's first climb at 9a (5.14d); Hubble was already considered the world's first consensus 8c+ (5.14c).) Action Directe is considered an important route in rock climbing history, and is one of the most attempted climbs at its grade, where it is considered the "benchmark" for the level of 9a. The plyometric training techniques and customized equipment that Güllich used to prepare for the unique physical demands of Action Directe also revolutionized climbing and what could be achieved.

== History ==
A close friend of Güllich, German climber Milan Sykora introduced him to the route that he had been working on at a large limestone prow at the Waldkopf crag, which was akin to an enormous boulder. Sykora was one of the leading German climbers at the time and had created several new routes UIAA grade X. In the 1980s, Sykora had bolted a line coming from the right and had managed to climb the individual moves through the upper section, and believed the lower section feasible but too hard for himself – he generously offered the project to Güllich, who promptly bolted the direct start, and hence the name "Directe"; Güllich said that it also named after the French terror group Action directe as climbing it felt like an attack on the fingers.

Güllich completed the first free ascent on 14 September 1991, after 11 days of working the route – spread over three weeks – and using a 16-move sequence including a direct start with a dynamic jump into a two-finger pocket to redpoint it. Güllich was 30 at the time and had been married just 5 days previously to freeing the route. Four years later the route was repeated when East German climber Alexander Adler fulfilled what he called an "obsession" to repeat the climb.

Subsequent climbers have used a slightly different circa 11 to 13-move sequence to Güllich's original very direct 16-move sequence. At the 25-year anniversary of its first ascent, ten climbers who had completed the route assembled and estimated only Adler had repeated Güllich's exact 16-move sequence, and that all others had crossed slightly right to use a shorter sequence.

Güllich conservatively assigned a UIAA grade of XI, which was between 8c+ (5.14c) and 9a (5.14d). Subsequent ascents would verify its grade, which has since described as the "gold standard" or "benchmark" for 9a (5.14d); and the first ever 9a in history. It wasn't for almost another decade, until 2001 when Chris Sharma freed the 35-metre Realization/Biographie at Céüse in France, that a higher consensus 9a+ (5.15a) grade would be assigned.

On 22 May 2020, French climber Mélissa Le Nevé made the first female free ascent and almost three decades after Güllich's original ascent was still only the 27th person to have climbed it. Two claimed ascents, Richard Simpson (2005), and Said Belhaj (2018), are disputed.

== Route ==
Action Directe is famous for its unique style, involving physically demanding dynamic moves (known as dynos in bouldering) off single-finger pockets in the limestone, and in particular, a powerful initial dynamic jump-start into a two-finger pocket while leaning back at an extreme angle of 45-degrees. The route is short at 15-metre (49 ft) and took Güllich only 70-seconds to complete his very direct 16-move sequence; most ascents post the second ascent move rightwards to a more efficient 11 to 13 move sequence described as slightly easier than Güllich's original sequence (although still solidly 9a).

After his 2016 ascent, German climber David Firnenburg described it as: "The initial dyno into the sharp two-finger pocket is followed by a passage with extreme lock-offs on small finger pockets. Then there are technically complicated side holds and pinches with difficult foot changes before you run out with a tricky must-hit crimp at the very end, where I still fell several times before sending".

== Legacy ==
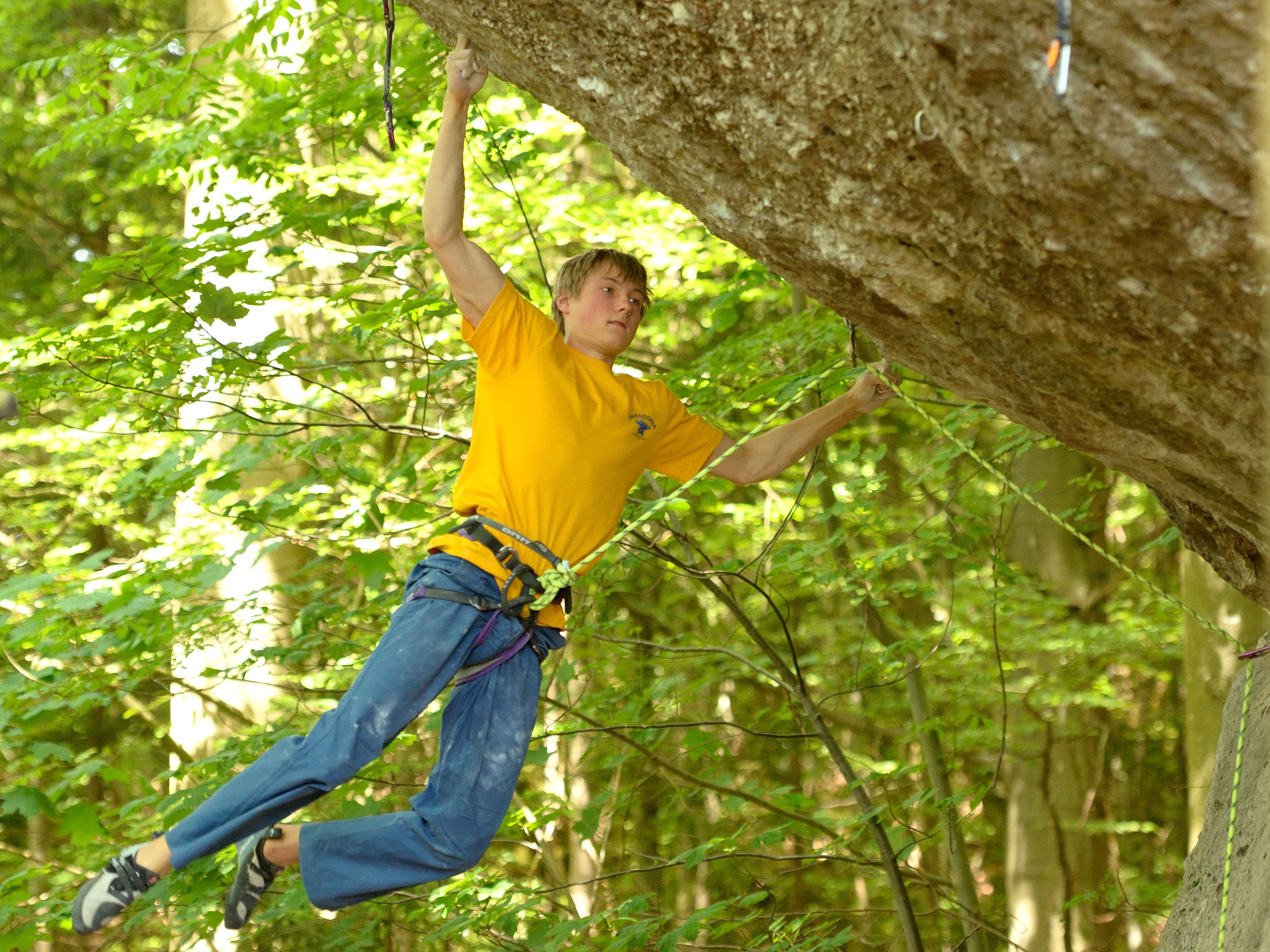
Alex Megos on Action Directe

Action Directe has been consistently described as famous, legendary, and iconic in the climbing media. Action Directe has been described as "Güllich's masterpiece," and a testpiece for 9a (5.14d). When Güllich freed the route, he was considered to be at the height of his physical and technical powers.

Güllich had used new intensive training techniques called plyometrics to prepare for the physical demands of the climb, and introduced the climbing world to the "campus board", which would become the new standard for future extreme climbers to build finger strength and develop more dynamic muscle strength.

Some have speculated whether English climber Ben Moon's 1990 ascent of the very short Hubble, with only 4 crux moves, was actually the world's first 9a (5.14d) route. Repeat ascents of Hubble have verified it as being at least the world's first 8c+ (5.14c). German climber Alex Megos, is one of the few who have climbed both Hubble and Action Directe, and felt Hubble was probably an 8c+ in the right conditions, although Megos caveated himself by noting that grading is not an exact science, and is subject to the climber's own style. In 2022, British climber Buster Martin became only the second climber to have climbed both routes and felt that they were both 9a; he did note that being sponsored by Ben Moon might make people skeptical of his view.

The situation has been compared to the Realization versus Alexander Huber's Open Air debate on the world's first 9a+ (5.15a). In fact, Huber attributes the initial conservative 8c+ (5.14c) grading of Action Directe that persisted for many years, despite it being eventually shown to be a "hard 9a", for artificially suppressing the grades of other routes in the 1990s, such as Huber's La Rambla, and Weisse Rose.

== Ascents ==
Action Directe has been ascended by:

- 1st. Wolfgang Güllich, 14 September 1991
- 2nd. Alexander Adler, 9 September 1995
- 3rd. Iker Pou, 7 June 2000
- 4th. Dave Graham, 21 May 2001
- 5th. Christian Bindhammer, 14 May 2003
- 6th. Richard Simpson, 2005 (disputed)
- 7th. Dai Koyamada, 15 October 2005
- 8th. Markus Bock, 22 October 2005
- 9th. Kilian Fischhuber, September 2006
- 10th. Adam Ondra, 19 May 2008
- 11th. Patxi Usobiaga, 24 October 2008
- 12th. Gabriele Moroni, 17 April 2010
- 13th. Jan Hojer, 22 May 2010
- 14th. Adam Pustelnik, 10 October 2010
- 15th. Felix Knaub, October 2011
- 16th. Rustam Gelmanov, 26 March 2012
- 17th. Alexander Megos, 3 May 2014
- 18th. Felix Neumärker, 16 May 2015
- 19th. Julius Westphal, 25 June 2015
- 20th. Stefano Carnati, 14 June 2016
- 21st. David Firnenburg, November 2016
- 22nd. Stephan Vogt, 2017.
- 23rd. Simon Lorenzi, 2017
- 24th. Said Belhaj, 2018 (disputed)
- 25th. Stefan Scarperi, 2 November 2018.
- 26th. Adrian Chmiała, 5 May 2019
- 27th & 1st Female Free Ascent. Mélissa Le Nevé, May 2020.
- 28th. Phillip Gaßner, May 2021
- 29th. Buster Martin, October 2022
- 30th. Vojtěch Trojan, April 2023
- 31st. Moritz Welt, October 2023
- 32nd. Stefano Ghisolfi, November 2023
- 33rd. Michał Korban, September 2024
- 34th. Lukáš Mokroluský, March 2025
- 35th. Josef Šindel, July 2025
- 36th. Satone Yoshida, October 2025
- 37th. Nigel Armino 26 October 2026

== Filmography ==
- Dai Koyamada's 2005 ascent: Action Directe (Motion picture). Frontier Spirits Productions. 2006.
- Jan Hojer's 2014 (second) ascent: Falquet, Nicolas (director) (May 2014). Rock Climbing Classics: Episode 2 – Action Directe 9a (Motion picture). Mammut.
- Stephan Vogt's 2017 ascent: Funke, Alexej (director) (October 2017). The Fire Within (Motion picture). Mad Rock Climbing.
- Mélissa Le Nevé's 2020 ascent: Lowell, Josh (director), Mortimer, Peter (director) (2020). ReelRock 15 (Motion picture). Sender Films.

== See also ==
- History of rock climbing
- List of grade milestones in rock climbing
- Silence, first climb in the world with a potential grade of 9c (5.15d)
- La Dura Dura, second climb in the world with a consensus grade of 9b+ (5.15c)
- Jumbo Love, first climb in the world with a potential grade of 9b (5.15b)
- Realization/Biographie, first climb in the world with a consensus grade of 9a+ (5.15a)
- Hubble, first climb in the world with a consensus grade of 8c+ (5.14c)
