= The School Room =

Indoor climbing wall in Sheffield, England

Coordinates: 53.386°N 1.476°W

The School Room is a rock climbing training facility in Sheffield, South Yorkshire, England. The facility was originally built in 1993 by Gavin Ellis, Ben Tye and Andy Coish, as conditions at Peak District Limestone venues (at which they trained) were not always ideal. The facility was made famous by its reputation for its extremely difficult problems. Many notable international rock climbers were trained at The School Room, including Ben Moon.

The School Room received its name from the fact that its original location, in the Heeley Bank School community centre, formed a portion of an old school building. Another portion of the building was used for an art studio. The facility consisted of four plywood climbing walls, which are covered with wooden and plastic holds, at angles of between 15 and 52 degrees.

In 2006, the School Room was under threat of closure and Sheffield City Council had asked all users of the centre to vacate the premises. Despite a successful petition being established to save the facility, the original School Room closed in 2006, but was reopened with the same walls in a different warehouse space in 2014 by Moon.
