= Sandy Smith (visual artist) =

Scottish visual artist

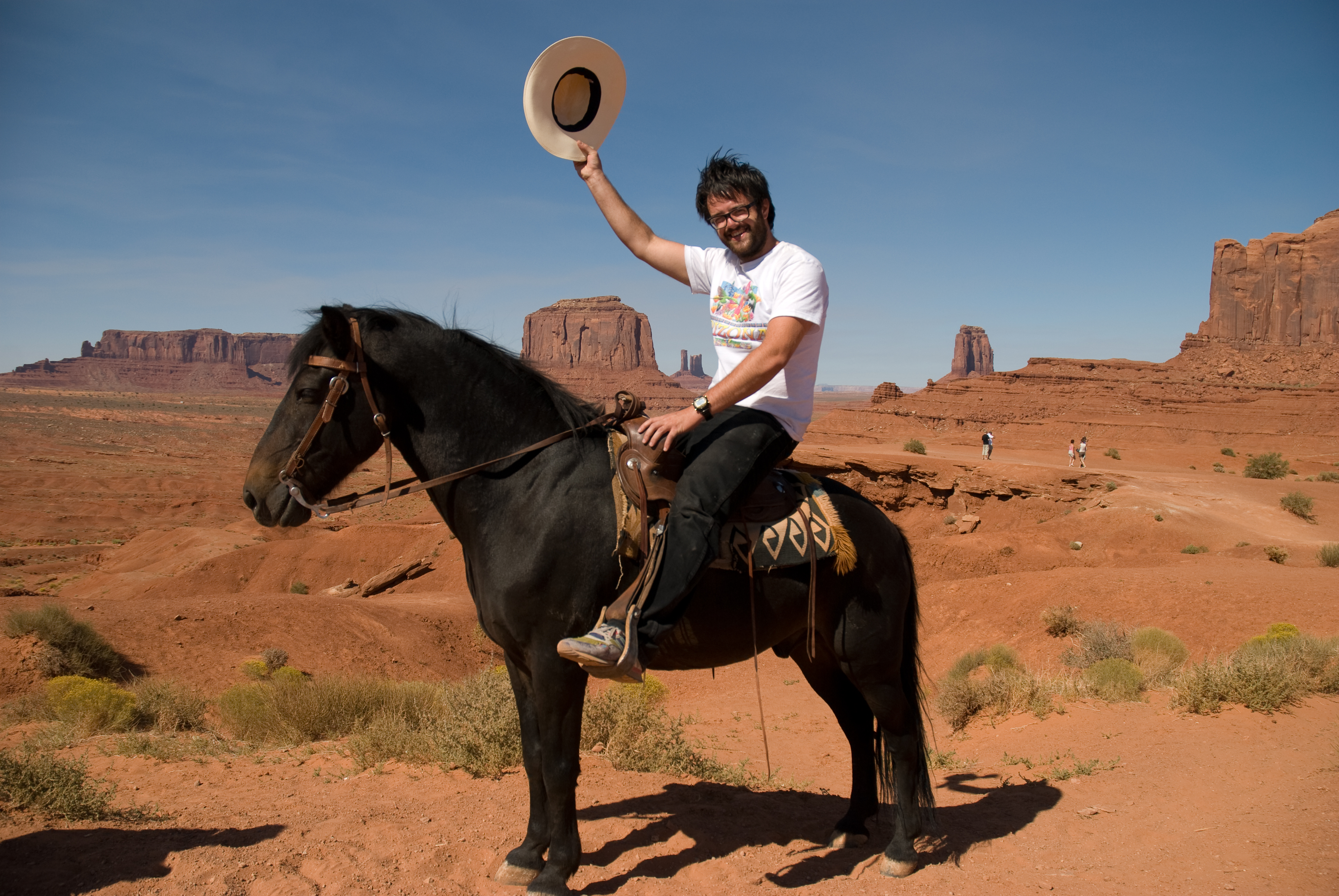
- Smith during ‘Road Trip USA 08’ project.
- Born: 2 August 1983; Dunbar, Scotland
- Known for: Sculpture, installation, video, painting, book-works
- Awards: Fulbright Scholarship, New Work Scotland Project, Dewar Arts Award
- Website: www.sandysmith.co.uk

Sandy Smith (born 2 August 1983) is a Scottish visual artist based in New York City.

== Biography ==
Smith was born in the Scottish town of Dunbar and later moved to Glasgow to study Art at the Glasgow School of Art from 2001 to 2005. His first solo exhibition in Glasgow was in 2006. Since this time Smith has exhibited widely in Scotland and Internationally, to some critical success in Denmark and the USA. He is the younger brother of professional Rock Climber Malcolm Smith

== Major works and projects ==
"Road Trip USA" During August 2008, Smith undertook a collaborative project with another Glasgow-based artist, Alex Gross, which saw them create 3 solo exhibitions during a 9000 miles road trip around the western United States. A project was organized by Smith and Gross, and funded by the Scottish Arts Council and the British Council. The trip was, in Sandy Smith's words, to be a "fast, flowing journey into optimism, failure, modernism, landscape and tourism, as well as a jovial examination of the artist's role in relation to these grand ideals". The eleven-week trip resulted in three successful exhibitions in Seattle, Las Vegas and Utah, and lead to the pair being awarded a New Work Scotland award at Edinburgh's Collective Gallery, where their final collaborative exhibition was held in December 2008. This exhibition was also documented in Art Review.

"Junior: A monument in film making history" is the title of an essay commissioned by the artist from an academic essay writing company. In May 2007, the essay was to prove that Junior is the best film ever made, and reference various philosophers and thinkers such as Roland Barthes, Jean Baudrillard, Michel Foucault, Sigmund Freud and Marc Augé amongst others. The essay itself is available to download from a website Smith set up specifically to host this project, www.juniorbestfilmever.info. The topic has also spurred a competition where the public is invited to submit their own take on why the film should be considered the greatest ever made, with cash prizes available for the winning entries. In February 2008, despite Sunday Herald covering the story, the competition received fewer entries than there were prizes available, and the competition has been ‘infinitely extended’ according to Smith's website.
