= Overhang (climbing) =

Type of rock climbing route

Examples of overhangs (and roofs) in climbing

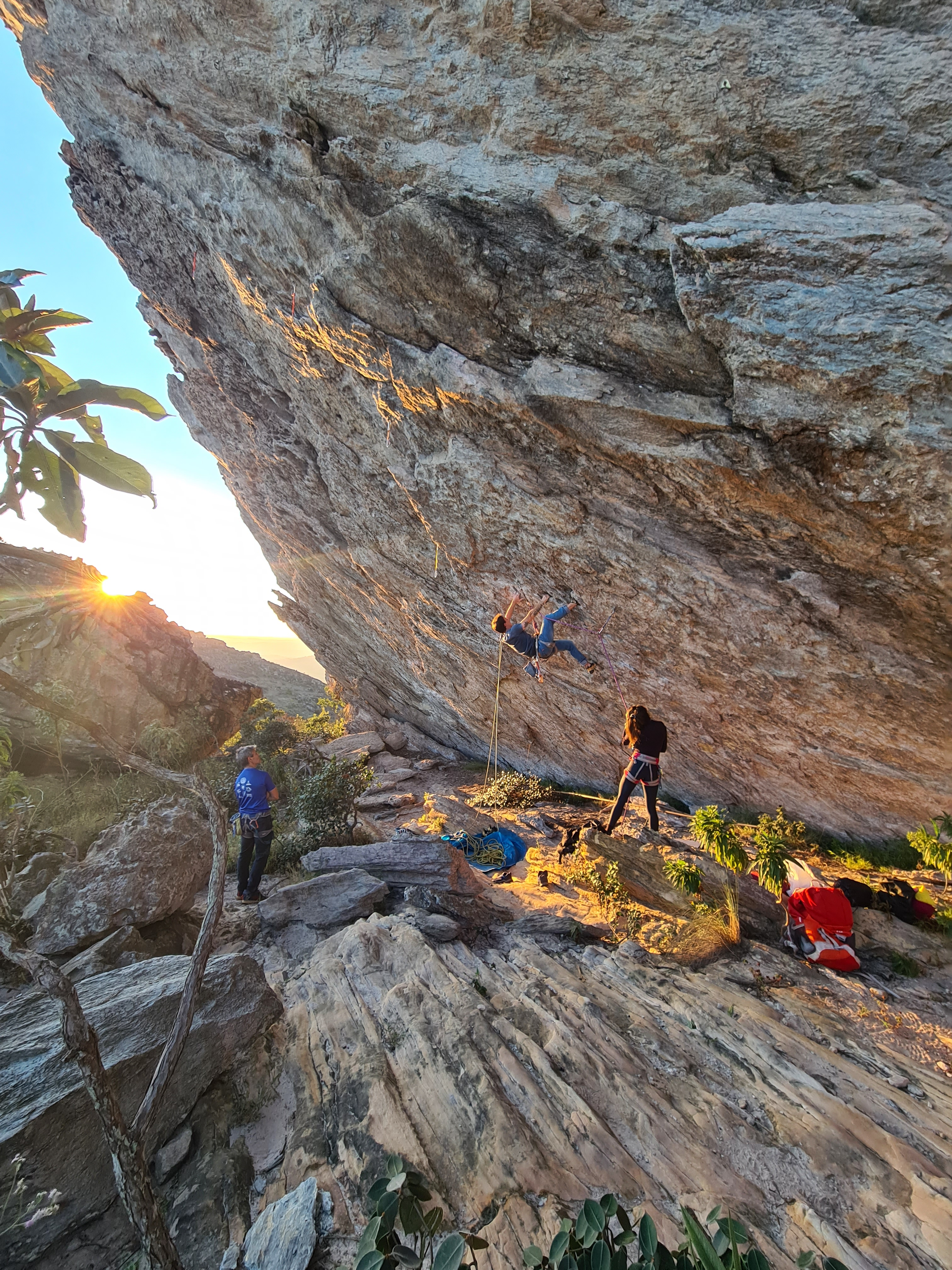
Sport climbing

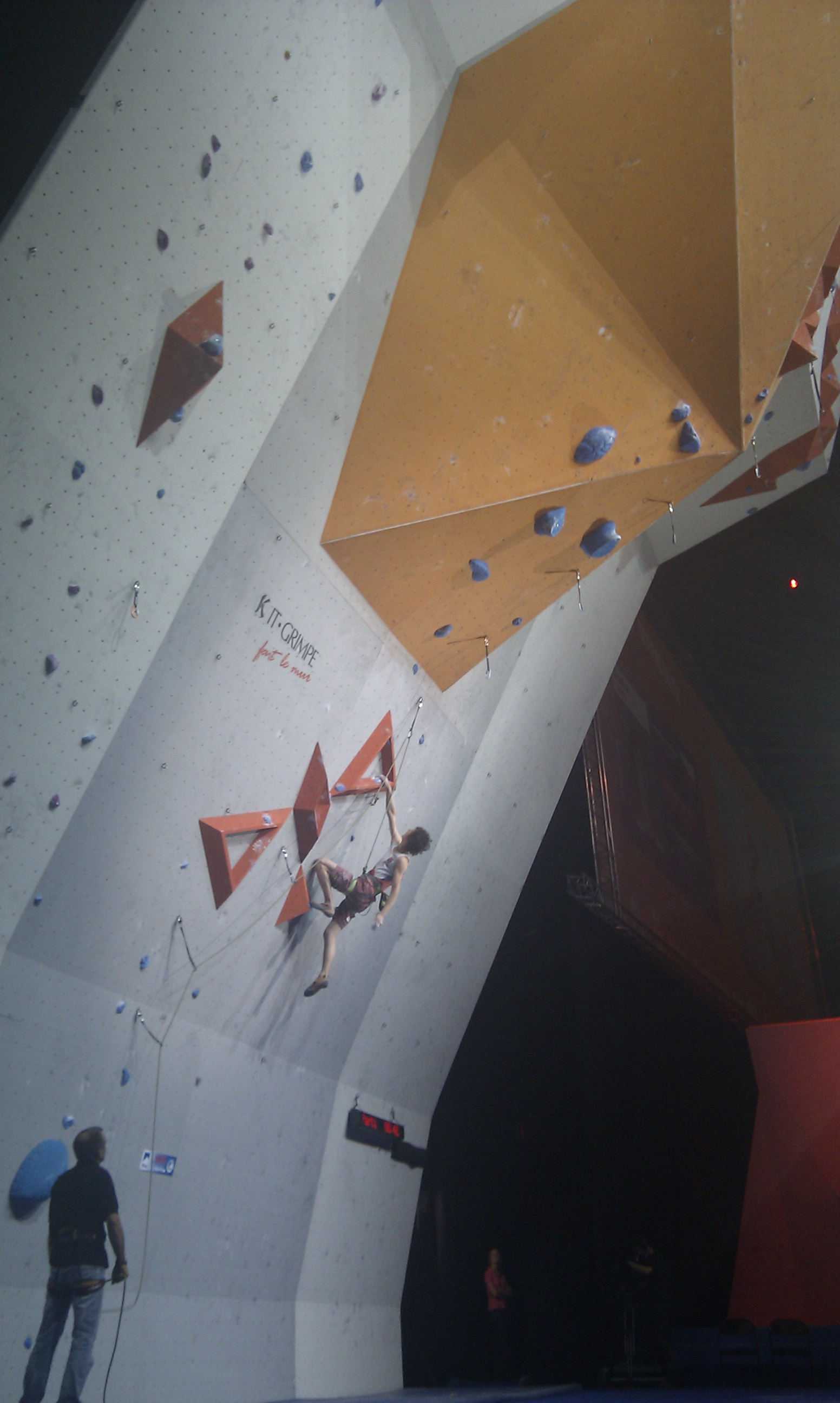
Competition climbing

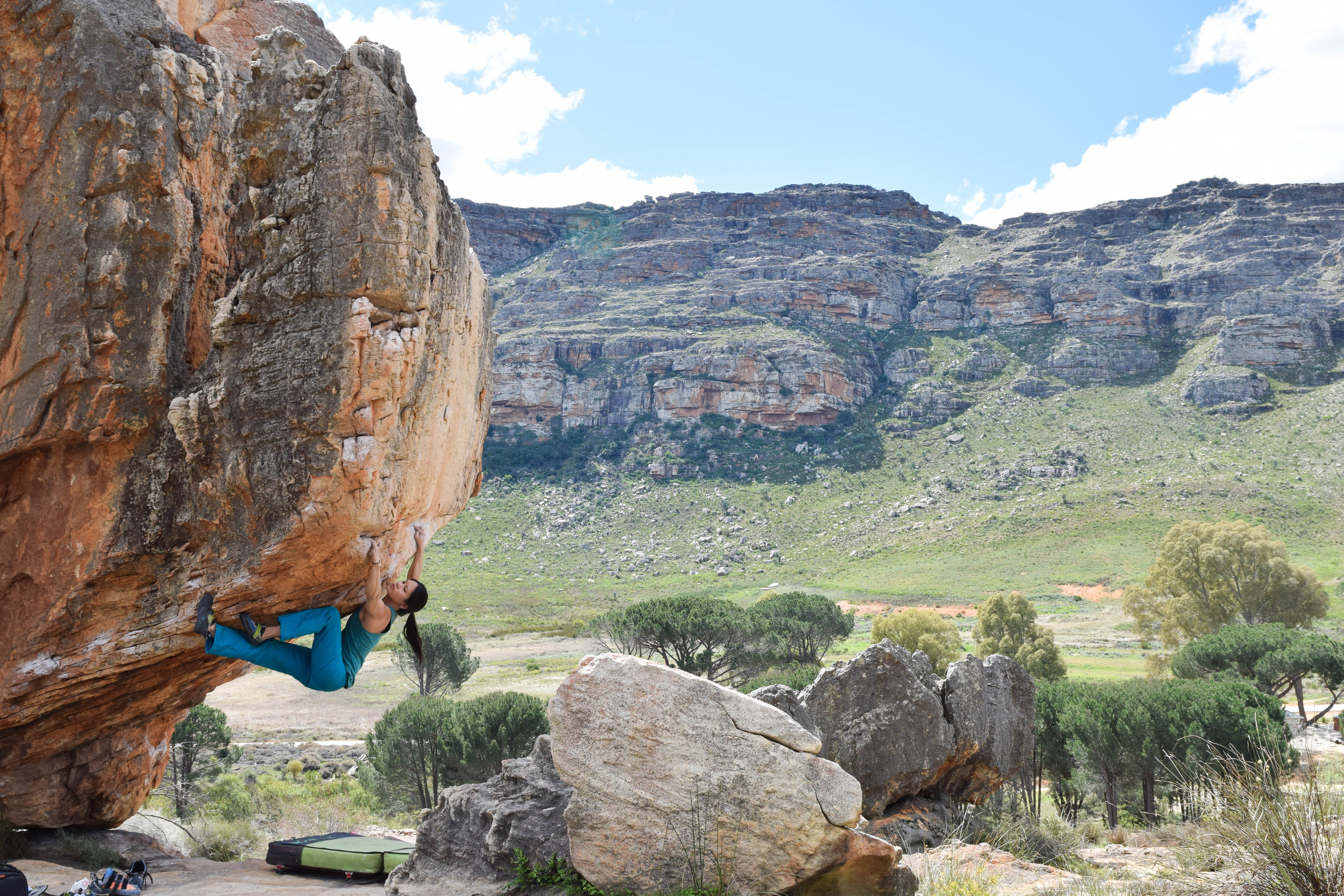
Bouldering

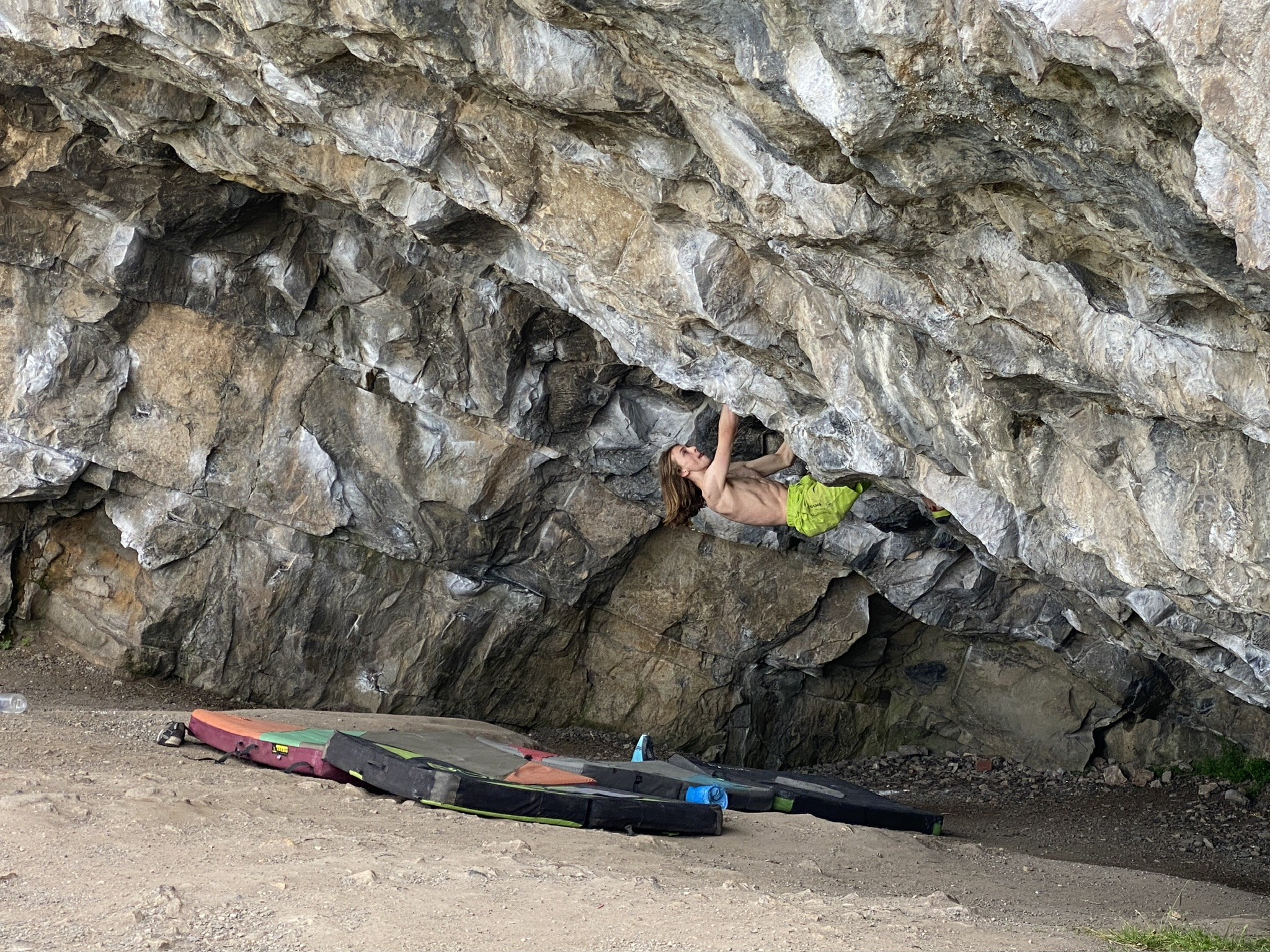
Free solo climbing

In rock climbing, an overhang is a type of route that leans back at an angle of over 90 degrees for part or all of the climb, and at its most severe can be a horizontal roof. Overhang (and roof) climbs have existed throughout climbing, originally in aid climbing where mechanical devices were used to first scale them. They became more common in free climbing during the 1990s as sport climbers used new training methods that enabled them to climb routes that were continuously, and severely, overhanging. Overhangs (and roofs) also feature prominently in advanced bouldering and in competition climbing.

Overhanging routes require a range of techniques to manage the demands placed on the upper body, as the feet are less weighted. Body positioning — keeping the hips close to the rock face and the arms straight — is important. Advanced techniques such as the drop-knee, side-pulls, underclings, gastons, and the full range of heel and toe hooks are used for this. Knee-bars and bat hangs are used to rest on the routes. Overhangs can force dynamic movements such as campusing and dynos, where the feet lose contact with the face. Exiting an overhang (or roof) can require awkward mantle moves.

Crack climbing techniques enabled traditional climbers to free-climb dramatic roofs and overhangs, one of the most notable being Separate Reality. In 1991, Wolfgang Gullich, who had set several grade milestones on bolted face climbing sport routes, ascended the short but severely overhanging Action Directe creating the first-ever 9a (5.14d) graded route. Gullich was a pioneer of plyometric training in climbing, which gave him the power to ascend severely overhanging routes. All subsequent grade milestones in climbing would come from continuously overhanging sport-climbing routes including Realization/Biographie, the first-ever 9a+ (5.15a), Jumbo Love, the first-ever 9b (5.15b), Change, the first-ever 9b+ (5.15c), and Silence the first-ever 9c (5.15d). The dominance of overhanging routes in sport climbing meant that they also became standard in competition climbing routes.

Overhangs and roofs also feature prominently in advanced bouldering, including on notable routes such as The Mandala, Dreamtime, The Wheel of Life, and Burden of Dreams, the first-ever boulder problem to be graded 9A (V17). Several notable multi-pitch and big-wall routes, feature famous overhangs and roofs, including "The Great Roof" on pitch 22 of The Nose on El Capitan, and the enormous series of roofs on the north face of the Cima Ovest through which Bellavista ascends, the world's first-ever 8c (5.14b) graded multi-pitch route. In 2019, Edu Marin freed Valhalla, the world's largest roof-climb spanning 405 metres (1,329 ft) over 14 pitches, and was also the world's first 5.15a (9a+) multi-pitch route.

== See also ==
- Crack climbing
- Face climbing
- Slab climbing
- Rock-climbing technique
