= Silence (climb) =

Sport climbing route in Norway

- Project Hard
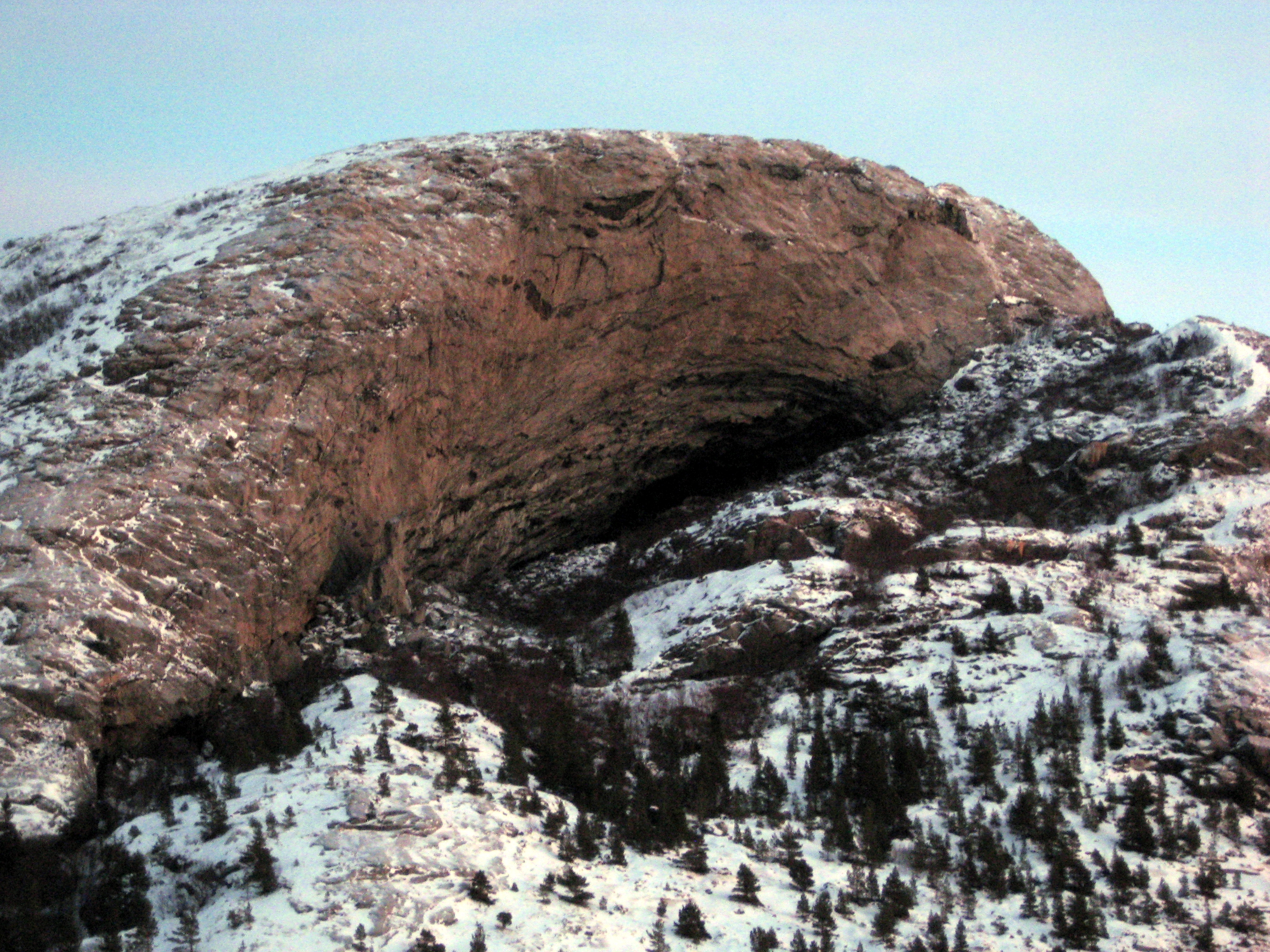
- Hanshelleren Cave, in Flatanger Municipality, has some of the world's hardest climbing routes, including Change 9b/+ , B.I.G 9c (5.15d), and Silence 9c (5.15d).

- Location within Norway
- Location: Flatanger Municipality, Norway
- Coordinates: 64°29′23″N 10°49′07″E
- Climbing area: Hanshelleren Cave, Flatanger Municipality
- Route type: Sport climbing; Overhang (roof) climbing
- Rock type: Granite
- Vertical gain: 45 metres (148 ft)
- Pitches: 1
- Technical grade: 9c (5.15d) (proposed)
- Bolted by: Adam Ondra
- First free ascent: Adam Ondra, 3 September 2017
- Known for: First-ever proposed 9c (5.15d) in history

Silence (also Project Hard), is a 45-metre (148 ft) severely overhanging sport climbing route in the granite Hanshelleren Cave in Flatanger Municipality, Norway. When Czech climber Adam Ondra made the first free ascent on 3 September 2017, it became the first rock climb in the world to have a proposed climbing grade of 9c (5.15d), and it is an important route in rock climbing history. To complete the route, Ondra undertook specialist physical and mental training to overcome its severely overhanging terrain. As of November 2026, Silence remains unrepeated.

== History ==
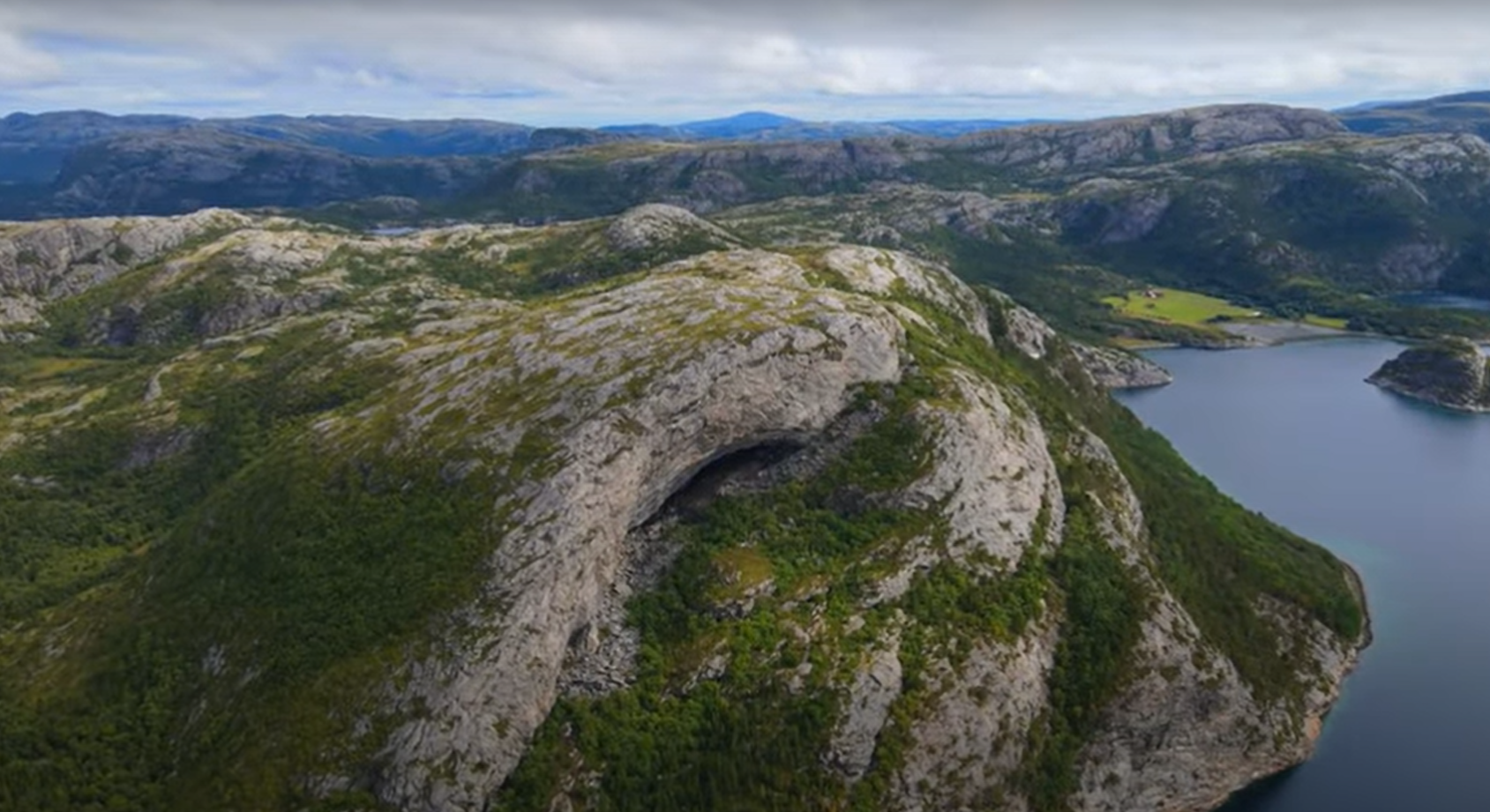
Setting of Hanshelleren cave

Ondra bolted the route in 2012–2013 while he climbed Change at Flatanger (the world's first 9b+ (5.15c)) but dropped the project for a period saying: "I could sort of imagine doing the individual moves, but I could see that linking the whole sequence, with its 8C boulder, all the way from the ground just looked way too ridiculous". After retrying it in 2015 and working through some of the technical challenges, Ondra began to commit more time to the project calling it "my lifetime goal", in a 2016 interview with Climbing. Ondra undertook specialist physical and mental training techniques for the route, including muscle work for the various critical kneebar rest positions, and route visualization for the sustained disorientation of the overhanging terrain.

After 40 days of climbing spread over 7 visits from 2016 to 2017, Ondra redpointed the route on 3 September 2017. On completion, Ondra said: "At the end of the route when I knew I did it, I had one of the strangest emotions ever", and "I clipped the anchor and I could not even scream. All I could do was just hang in the rope, feeling tears in my eyes. It was too much joy, relief, and excitement all mixed together". While the route was originally named Project Hard by Ondra, a few days after completion he renamed it Silence, stating that when climbing it he felt a sense of inner quiet, and that on completion he felt unable to scream in exhilaration, his trademark reaction on completing a climb.

Ondra described it as "much harder than anything else" he had previously done, and cautiously suggested the 9c (5.15d) rating, telling The Guardian, "Everyone knows what it means to run 100-meters in a world record time. Because grades in climbing are subjective, I am a fan of making big gaps between climbing grades. Knowing it was so much harder gives me the courage to say it is the world’s first at this level (9c)". In a 2020 interview, Ondra was asked if the route could actually be higher than 9c, he responded: "No, certainly not. 9c+ or even 10a would have to be much, much more difficult if we don't want to inflate the difficulty scale in the future either. Each step on the difficulty scale really has to be a noticeable step in the actual difficulty of the route".

Ondra's first ascent of the route was documented in the 2018 film, Silence.

In April 2022, French climber Sébastien Bouin – a frequent climbing partner of Ondra – established the world's second-ever 9c (5.15d) route, which he called DNA, in the La Ramirole cave, Verdon Gorge in France.

== Route ==
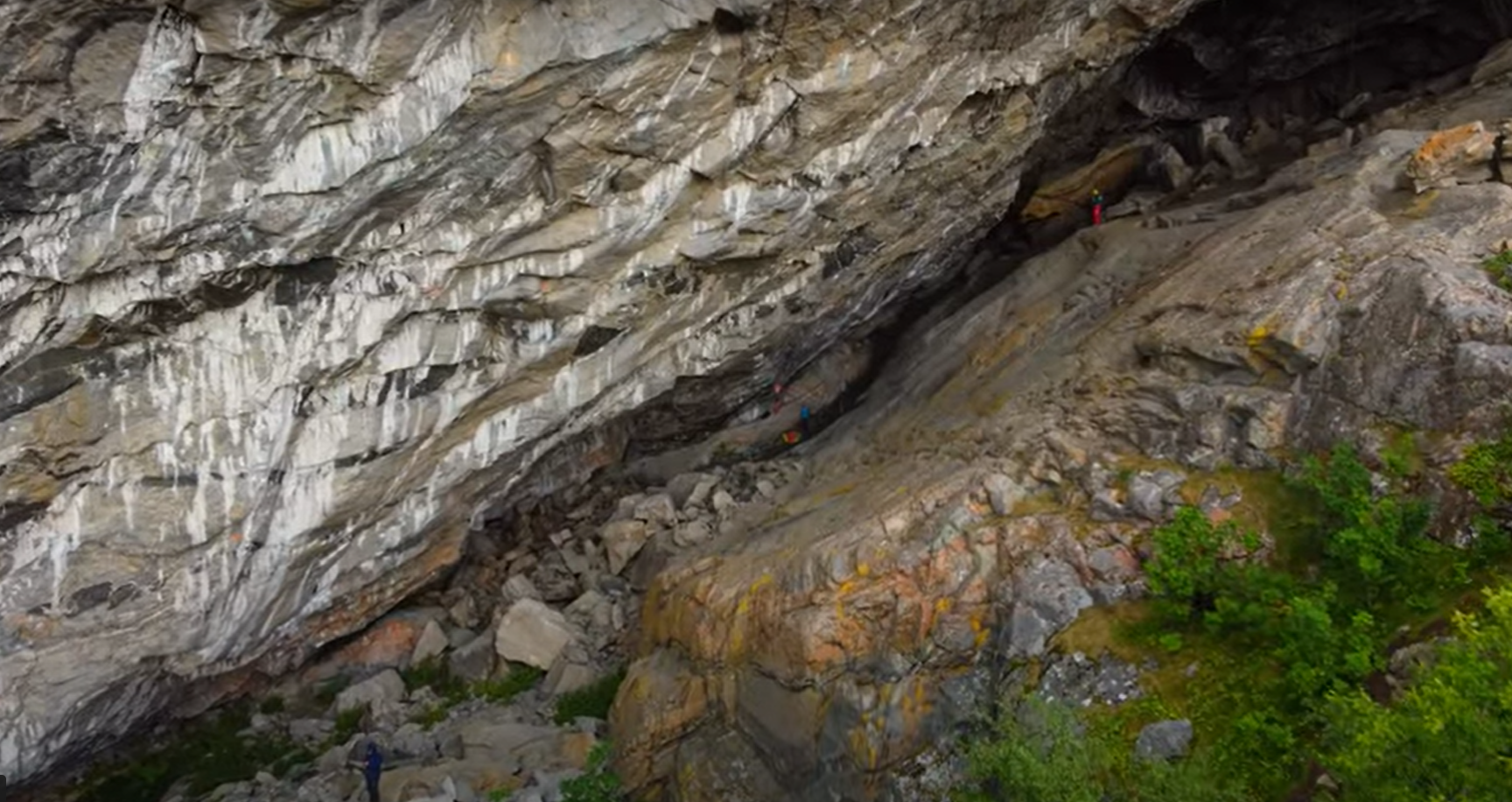
Mouth of the cave

Silence is approximately 45-metre (148 ft) long, curving up the granite cave wall and along part of the underside of its roof. Ondra estimated that the first 20 metres (66 ft) is at about 8b (5.13d) with good kneebar rests, and similar to the beginning of neighbouring routes Nordic Flower, and Change.

Silence then leads into a 5-move 7A+ (V7) problem, and then transitions into the crux, which is a sequence of three distinct boulder problems that Ondra estimated – using bouldering grades – as a hard 8C (V15), a "burly 4-move" 8B (V13), and finally a 7C+ (V10) with unsure-friction and slippery feet.

Ondra called the first crux boulder problem the hardest 8C (V15) he had ever climbed with 10 incredibly hard and very unusual moves, including single-finger locks, climbing upside down, and a variation of a figure four move, and finally ending with a poor kneebar rest where Ondra could hang upside-down for a minute to rest (having done specialist muscle training for this "bat-hang" rest). Ondra said the 8C boulder problem took the most time to solve. In a 2017 interview, Ondra added more color to the first 8C (V15) boulder crux stating: "The strangest moves are on the V15 crux 1, which is very physical, but the most precision-demanding climbing I have ever seen in my life. It is very hard to turn upside down, “stab” my left foot super high into the crack, doing it 100-percent precisely, [and] finish the sequence with this foot jam, doing the last move while doing the most extreme drop-knee I have ever done, which feels like it would tear my knee and back apart."

After the third boulder crux, a large jug leads to the anchor through a relatively easy 6C (V5) boulder consisting of five moves.

== Ascents ==
Ondra remains the only person to have climbed Silence. In 2020, Ondra said that there were very few climbers capable of climbing at 9c (5.15d), and that Silence suited his climbing preferences and style, but would not suit others. It was several years before famous test-pieces such as Action Directe at 9a (5.14d) or Realization/Biographie at 9a+ (5.15a) were repeated.

In 2020, English crack climbing specialist Pete Whittaker tried some crack techniques at the 8C (V15) bouldering crux to see if a climber could avoid the intense pressure on the knee that Ondra's approach used (Whittaker did not attempt any other part of the route). While Ondra found his techniques to have merit, they would also have drawbacks (especially the type of climbing shoes needed), and that would not affect the grade of the route.

Italian climber Stefano Ghisolfi failed to complete the route in August/September 2022, but felt that it was at 9c (5.15d); he returned in 2023, but with no success. In May 2024, Ghisolfi became the first climber to repeat the crux section, but could not complete the entire route. Will Bosi managed to repeat the crux in May 2026 describing it as equivalent to a V16 boulder.

== Filmography ==
- Adam Ondra's first ascent: Giménez, Bernardo (director) (2018). Silence (Motion picture). AO Productions.
  - The film was shown at the European Outdoor Film Tour.

== Gallery ==
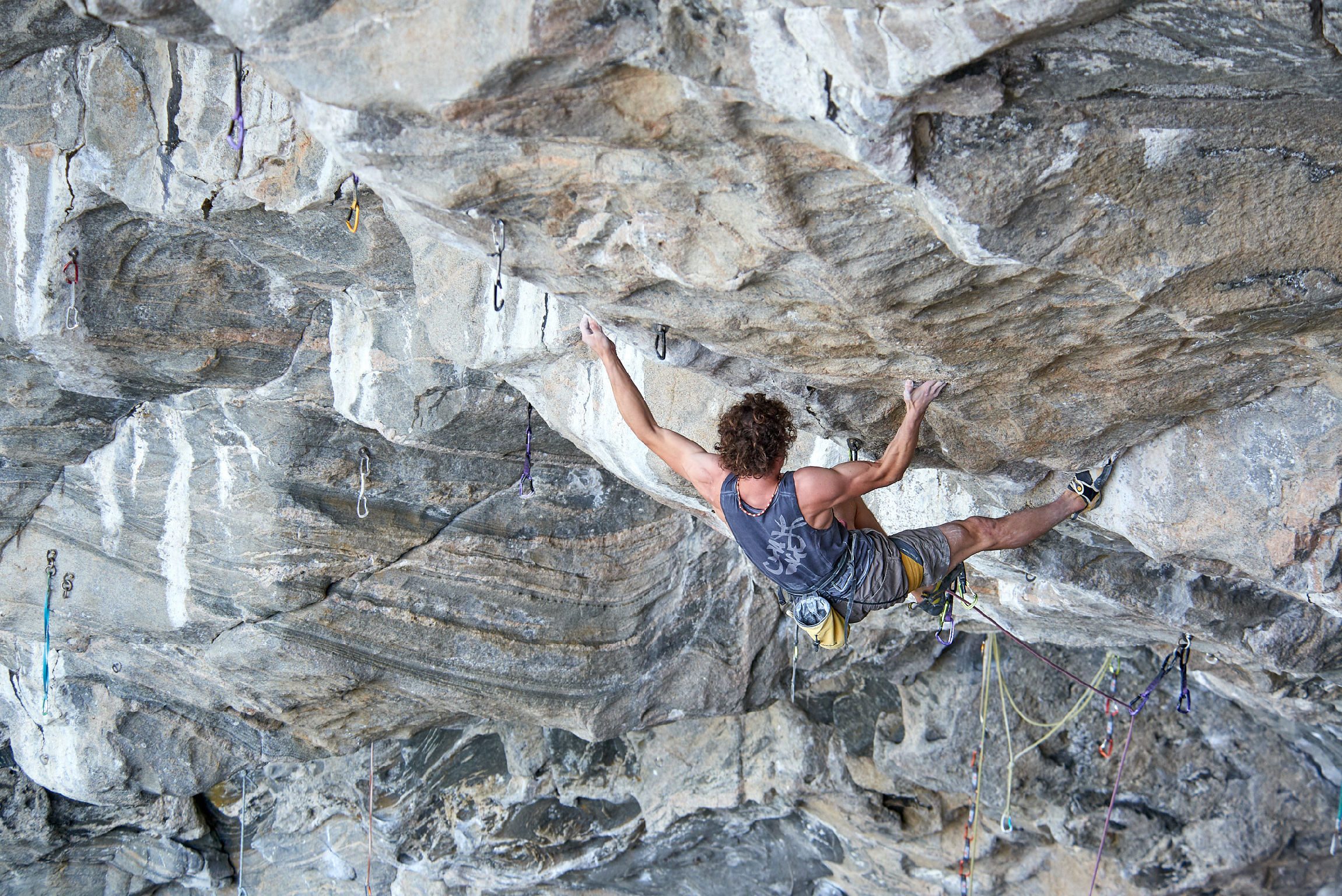
Ondra toe-hooking the start of the first crux (July 2017)

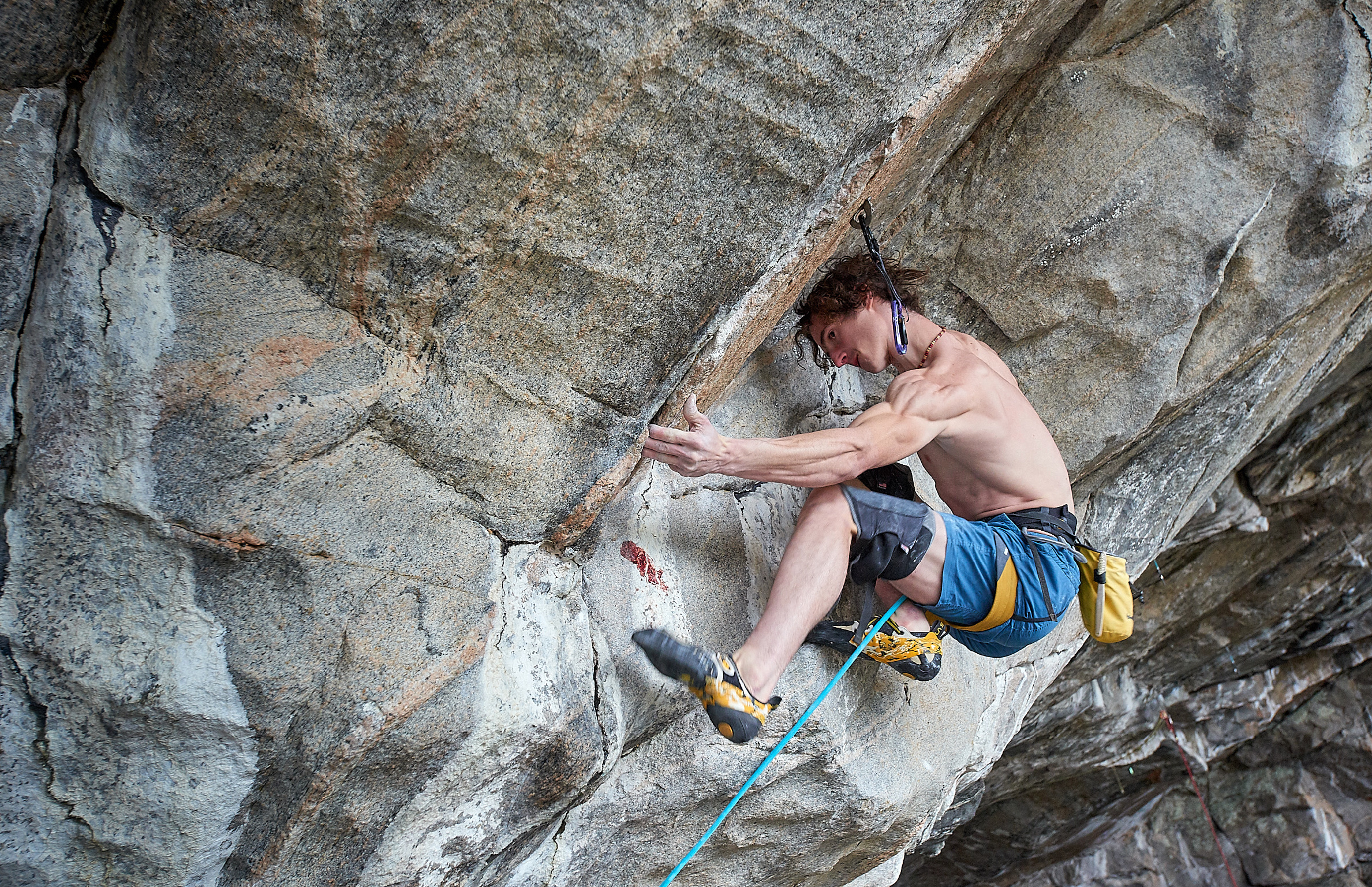
Ondra practicing the second crux (July 2017)

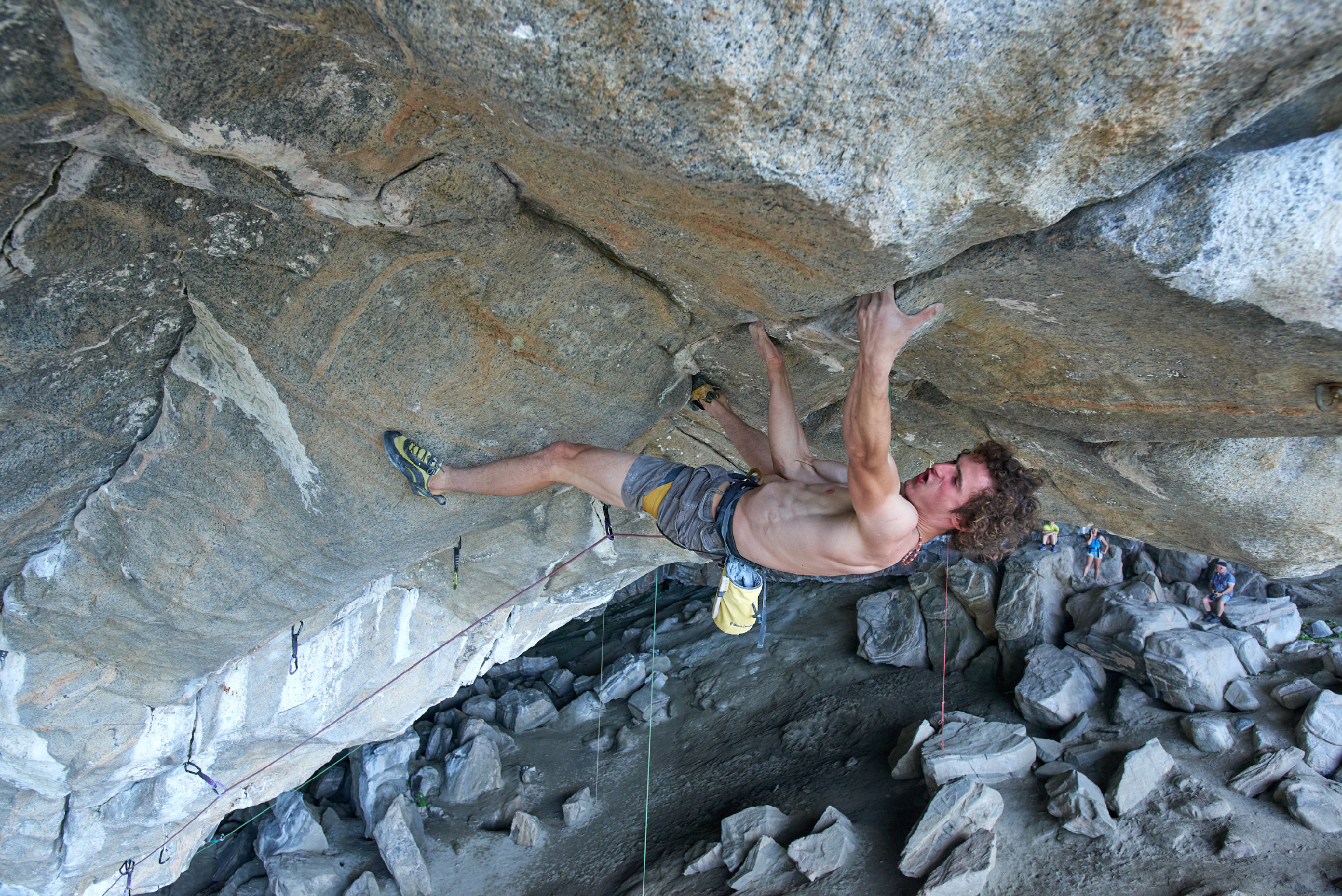
Ondra on the final jug, after the third crux (July 2017)

== See also ==
- History of rock climbing
- List of grade milestones in rock climbing
- La Dura Dura, second climb in the world with a potential grade of 9b+ (5.15c)
- Jumbo Love, first climb in the world with a consensus grade of 9b (5.15b)
- Realization/Biographie, first climb in the world with a consensus grade of 9a+ (5.15a)
- Action Directe, first climb in the world with a consensus grade of 9a (5.14d)
- Hubble, first climb in the world with a consensus grade of 8c+ (5.14c)
