= Bachar ladder =

Form of rope ladder

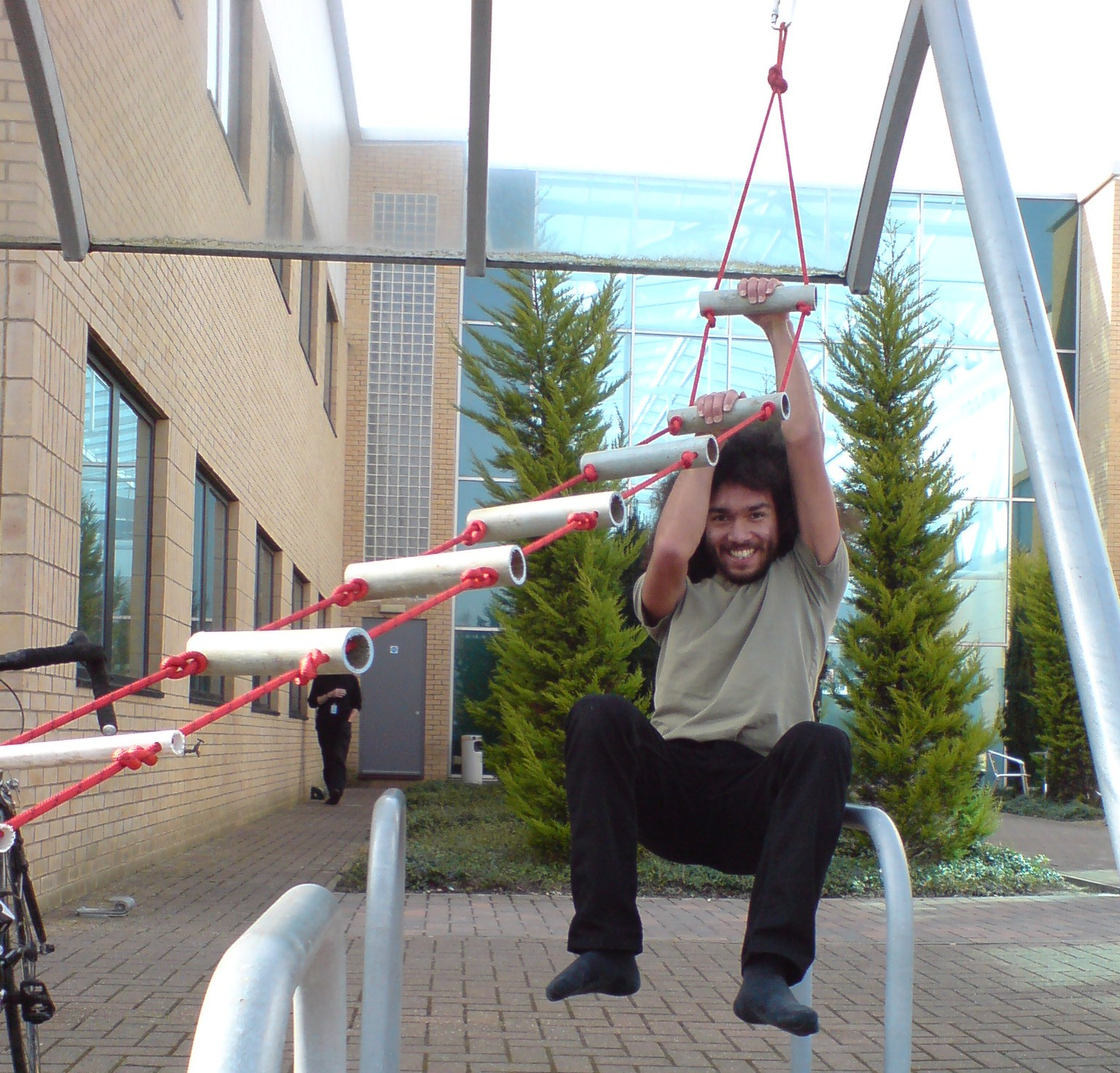
A man using a Bachar ladder

The Bachar ladder is a form of rope or metal ladder used as a training device by rock climbers to improve upper body strength.

Named after noted free soloist John Bachar, Bachar ladders typically consist of PVC rungs joined by webbing or cord to create an unstable structure similar to the ratlines of a sailing ship. However, unlike ascending ratlines leaning inward using one's legs for upward progress and arms for steadying, the Bachar Ladder is typically hung at an overhanging angle of 20-45° and climbed from below using only the arms.

Whereas the campus board focuses more on powerful, sometimes far-reaching movements, the Bachar ladder differs in that it swings slightly when it is being climbed, requiring the climber to use more core tension to maintain stability.

For athletes who have practiced pulling movements using only fixed or stable points, the Bachar ladder can improve the strength and efficiency of climbing/pulling movements. It produces greater engagement of core musculature, benefiting shoulder stability, improving motor unit recruitment when pulling and proprioception. It could present an increased risk of elbow and shoulder joint tendon/ligament injury for users who are inexperienced or lack proper pulling mechanics such as poor shoulder range of motion.

== See also ==
- Escalade
