= Campus board =

Training tool for rock climbers

Campus board

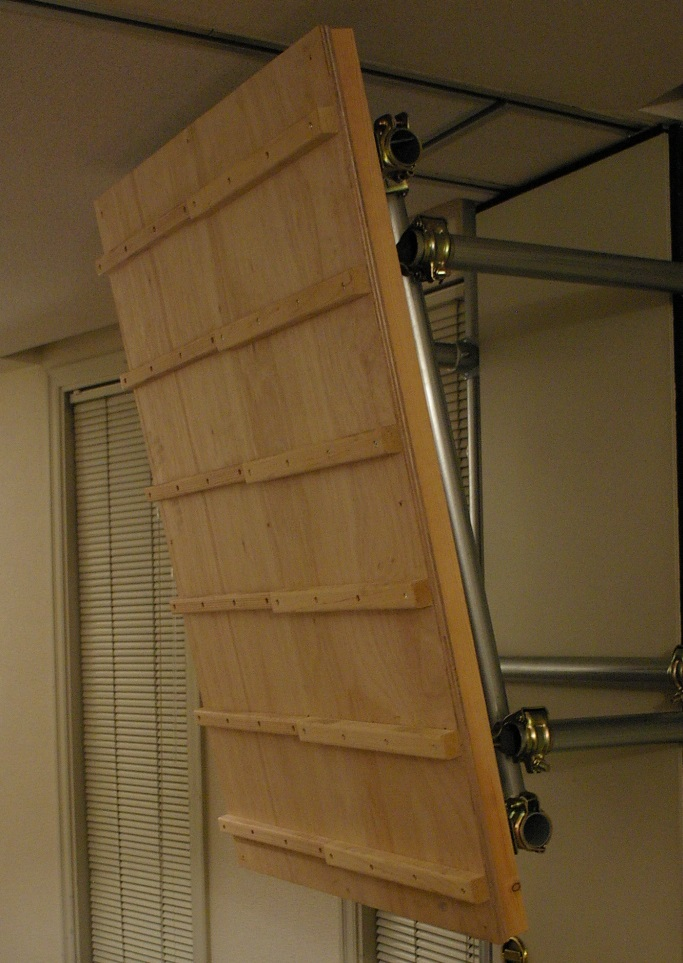
Board with wooden rungs

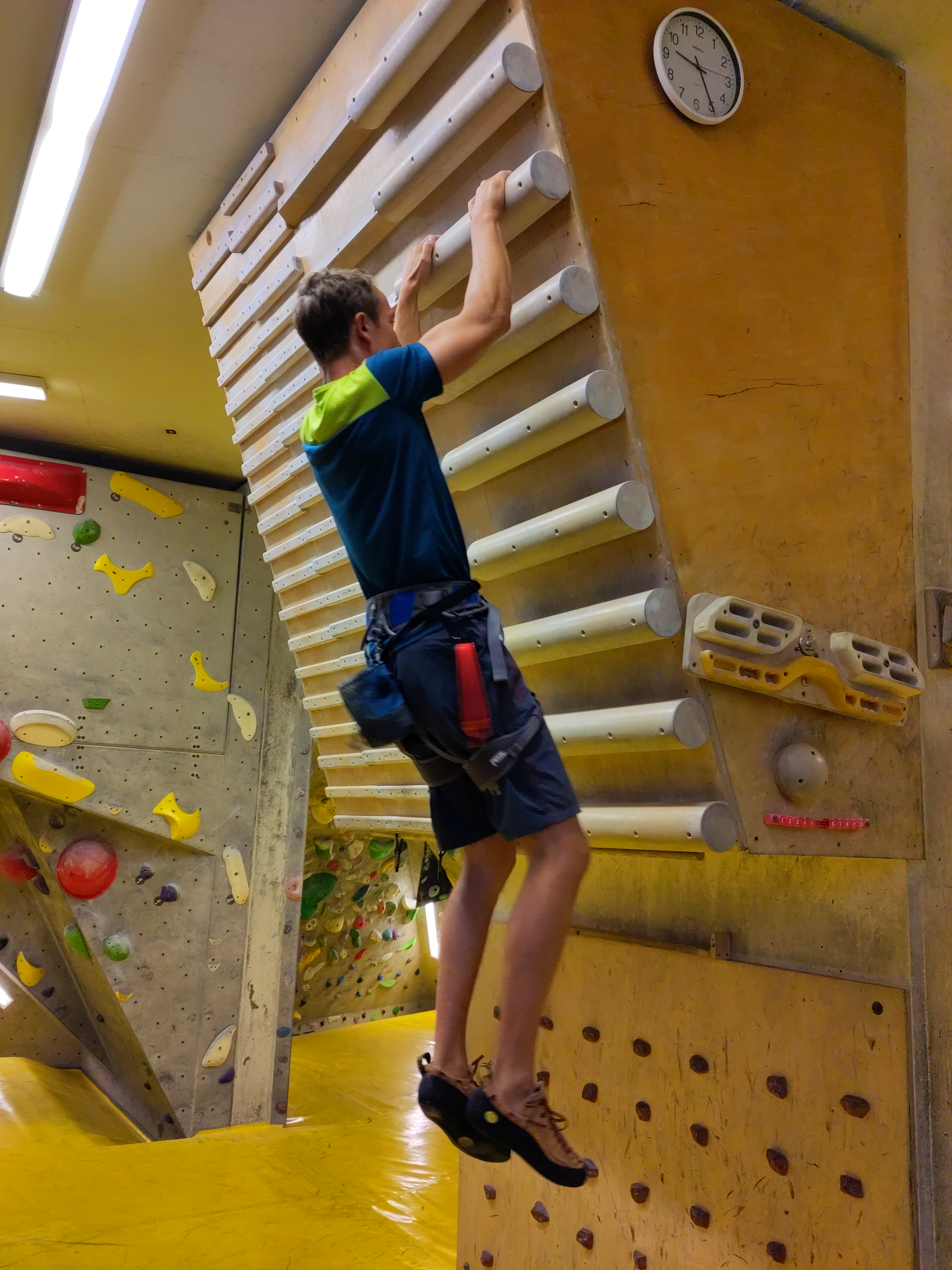
Training on a board

A campus board (or pan Güllich) is a training tool that has been widely adopted by sport climbers to improve their plyometric performance and led to dramatic improvements in climbing technique in all rock climbing disciplines. The campus board was invented in 1988 by German climber Wolfgang Güllich to help him climb the world's hardest consensus-graded route at the time, Action Directe, and has since become a standard training tool for climbers.

Other climbing training 'boards' have been developed since the campus board, including the MoonBoard, a small customized overhanging indoor climbing wall also for plyometric performance, and the hangboard (or also the fingerboard), a device for building up static strength, particularly in the fingers, but also in the arms.

== Description ==
Typically, a user ascends or descends the campus board using only their hands, and often leaping from hold to hold (i.e. both hands are off the board while transitioning between holds). Campus boards can take a variety of different forms and may incorporate a variety of materials. The earliest campus boards, still used today, were made of horizontal thin slats of wood rails attached to an inclined board in a ladder-like configuration. Later versions have utilized bolt-on climbing holds or sections of pipe. A campus board is generally set at an overhanging angle of inclination. One consideration for selecting the angle of inclination is the avoidance of any interference that may result between the user's legs and the campus board or wall.

There are a variety of training approaches that may be used with a campus board, but all of them are centered around the concept of plyometric training. As one example, a user may alternate the use of specific fingers to increase finger strength when ascending or descending the board. As another example, upper-body strength may be increased by utilizing large lunges between specific rails or holds of the campus board ("power throws"). Reactive training may be used to increase muscle recruitment rates by dynamically moving between the campus board rails simultaneously with one or both hands. Training on a campus board may result in better performance due to the improvement of motor training, increased finger strength on a variety of grips, and greater power and lock-off strength of the arms.

The campus board has been a topic of controversy especially for newer or younger climbers, as it risks causing injuries to the climber's tendons due to improper technique or fatigue. As such, the campus board is generally not recommended for more novice or younger climbers.

The first scientific analysis of campus board training was published in 2021.

== Development ==
The campus board was invented by German climber Wolfgang Güllich in 1988 while he was training for a new extreme sport climbing route called Action Directe, which required extreme dynamic finger strength. The first campus board was hung at a university in a gym called "The Campus Centre" in Nuremberg. Hence the term "campus" has been applied to the name of the training board, training method, and style of climbing, or "campusing" in which only the user's hands and arms are used. In French and in Italian, the campus board is referred to as pan Güllich. Early adopters of the campus board included British climbers Jerry Moffatt and Ben Moon, who trained with Gullich and his climbing partner Kurt Albert, at their German gym.

== Other climbing boards ==
=== MoonBoard ===
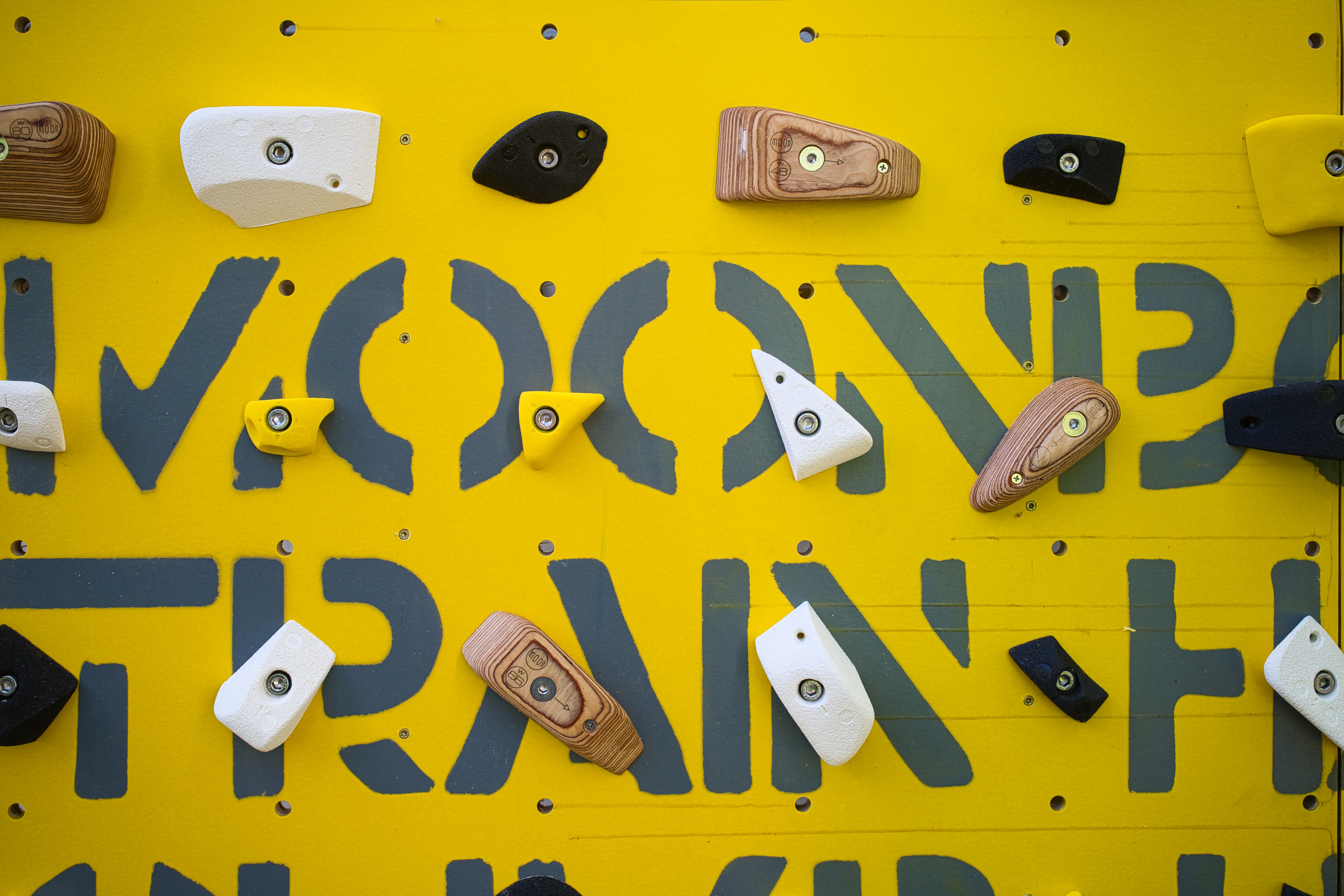
Section of a MoonBoard

The MoonBoard is a rectangular 2.44-metre (8.0-foot) by 3.25-metre (10.7-foot) section of climbing wall, typically overhanging at 25 or 40 degrees, onto which climbing holds have been fixed in a dense grid-like fashion, with modern MoonBoards having almost 200 individual holds. The tool was first commercially manufactured by British climbers Ben Moon and Rich Simpson in 2005, as a copy of the tools that they and other leading British climbers were using at an informal indoor climbing gym called The School Room in Sheffield, England. Moon created earlier versions from wood in the late 1980s and 1990s, which he built with British climber Andy Pollitt as rudimentary indoor extreme training climbing walls that could fit into the basement of their house in Sheffield.

Moon further developed the product and in 2016 released a version with LED lights on the climbing holds so that climbers could follow pre-set sequences that could be shared by MoonBoard users worldwide (i.e. the grid of holds are identical on each MoonBoard edition), and with almost 200 holds, the online database for MoonBoard users had over fifty thousand graded sequences for climbers to attempt.

=== Kilter Board ===
The Kilter Board system is a fixed-layout app-controlled climbing wall with illuminated holds. Like the MoonBoard, the Kilter Board was developed to create an International climbing system with a shared database where users can add problems and keep a log of their climbs. The Original Kilter Board layout was tested and refined for over a year before the first board was released in 2018. There are now over 170 thousand climbs in the Kilter Board database. The Kilter Board Fullride layout was released in 2020 and has an additional 18 thousand climbs. The Kilter Board system has won the Climbing Business Journal Favorite Board System award every year since its advent in 2021.

=== Hangboard ===
Hangboards

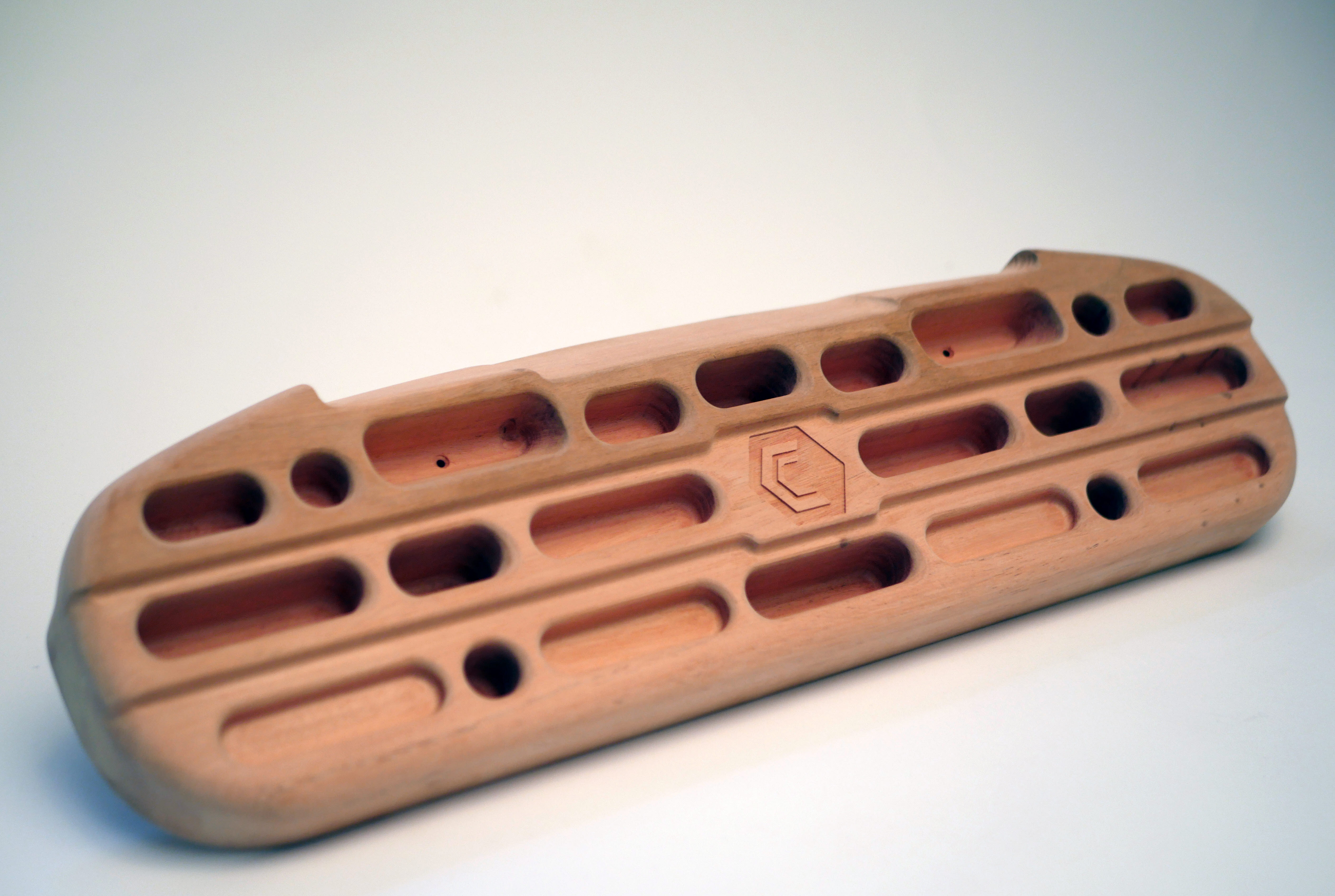
Wooden hangboard

Training on hangboards

After the development of the campus board, the hangboard (also called the fingerboard) was developed to focus on building static arm strength, and finger tendon strength. The hangboard is a popular training tool for all types of rock climbers and comes in many forms, shapes and materials. Uniquely, Janja Garnbret, one of the most successful competition climbers of all time, said she's not used to train with hangboards and that she considers it the worst alternative training to improve climbing skills.

=== Further boards ===
Other boards iclude the Woods Board, the Tension board and the Grasshopper.

== See also ==
- Bachar ladder
- Climbing wall
- Climbing technique
- History of rock climbing
- Rock-climbing equipment
