= Wolfgang Güllich =

German rock climber (1960-1992)

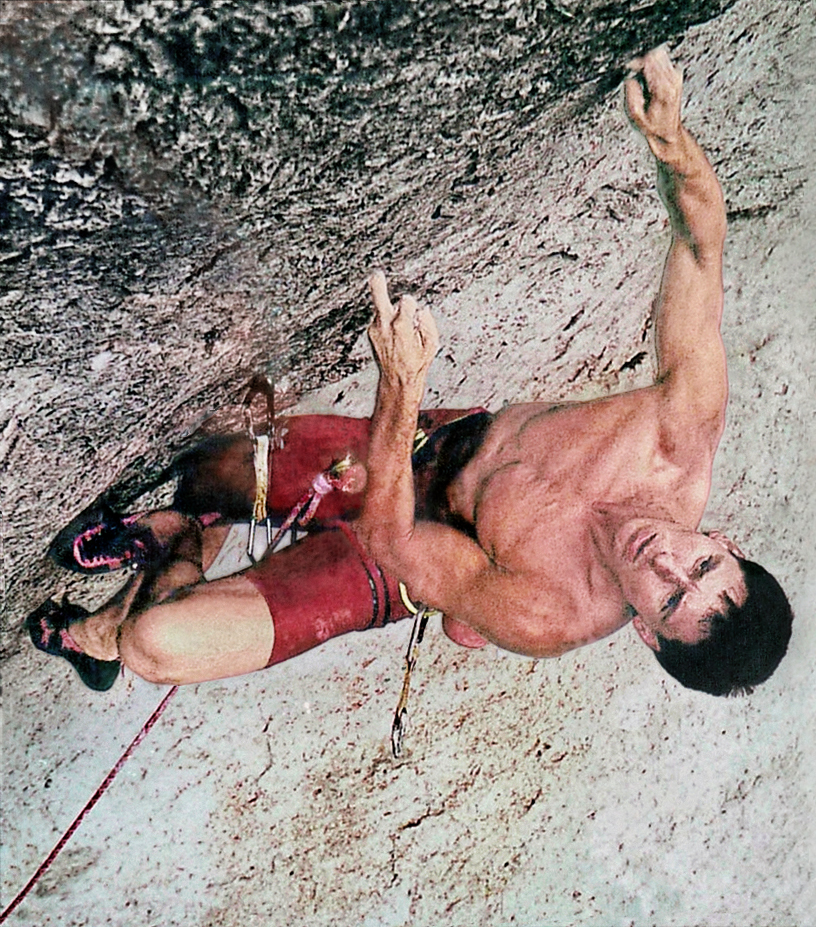
- Güllich on Ghettoblaster 8b+ (5.14a) X+, at Rabenfels, in the Frankenjura

Personal information
- Born: October 24, 1960 Ludwigshafen, West Germany
- Died: August 31, 1992 (aged 31) Ingolstadt, Germany
- Occupation: Professional rock climber
- Height: 178 cm (5 ft 10 in)
- Weight: 68 kg (150 lb)
- Spouse: Annette Favery (m. 1991)
- Website: www.wolfgangguellich.com

Climbing career
- Type of climber: Sport climbing; Traditional climbing; Free solo; Big wall climbing
- Highest grade: Redpoint: 9a (5.14d); Onsight/Flash: 7c+ (5.13a); Free solo: 7c (5.12d)
- First ascents: Kanal im Rücken (8b, 1984); Punks in the Gym (8b+, 1985); Wallstreet (8c, 1987); Action Directe (9a, 1991); Yugoslavian route (Trango Towers, free 5.12, 1988); Eternal Flame (Trango Towers, VI, 7b+, A2, 1989); Riders on the Storm (Paine Towers, VI 5.12d A3, 1991)
- Known for: First to climb consensus sport 8b (5.13d), 8b+ (5.14a), 8c (5.14b) and 9a (5.14d); First to free solo 7c (5.12d); Inventor of the campus board
- Updated on 29 November 2022

Wolfgang Güllich (24 October 1960 – 31 August 1992) was a German rock climber, who is considered one of the greatest and most influential climbers in the history of the sport. Güllich dominated sport climbing after his 1984 ascent of Kanal im Rücken, the world's first-ever redpoint of an 8b (5.13d) route. He continued to set more "new hardest grade" breakthroughs than any other climber in sport climbing history, with Punks in the Gym in 1985, the world's first-ever 8b+ (5.14a), Wallstreet in 1987, the world's first-ever 8c (5.14b), and with Action Directe in 1991, the world's first-ever 9a (5.14d).

Güllich was the first-ever person to free solo at grade 7c (5.12d) with his 1986 ascent of Weed Killer, and in that same year did his iconic free solo of Separate Reality. He made first ascents of important new big wall climbing routes on the Trango Towers and the Paine Towers. With long-time climbing partner Kurt Albert, he revolutionized the training techniques for sport climbers, and the introduction of the campus board in particular. Güllich carried the mantle of "world's strongest sport climber" until his death in a car accident at age 31.

== Early life ==
Wolfgang Güllich, was born in 1960 in Ludwigshafen, West Germany; the first son of Ursula and Fritz (Snr) Güllich. His father introduced him to aid climbing at the age of 13, and by age 15, he was climbing almost every weekend in the Südpfalz region with his younger brother Fritz (who in 1978 would die in a climbing accident). After an encounter with Reinhard Karl, a leading figure in German mountaineering at that time, Güllich decided to apply himself intensively to climbing, and to free climbing in particular – which at that time was traditional climbing as sport climbing was still not widely practiced.

== Climbing career ==
Güllich quickly became one of the best climbers in his region, making the first free ascent of the aid route, Jubiläumsriss (VII-), at the age of 16. In 1981, he left the sandstone Südpfalz region to live in the limestone Frankenjura region, where a group of leading German and British climbers were starting to raise standards, including German climber Kurt Albert and British climber Jerry Moffatt, who both become life-long friends and training partners of Güllich. In 1983, Güllich freed the first German grade IX+ 5.13a (7c+) route, Mister Magnesia, weeks before Moffatt freed Ekel (IX+), also in the Frankenjura.

Güllich made several notable trips to the US, coming to international attention in 1982 with the first repeat of Tony Yaniro's historic 1979 8a (5.13b) route, Grand Illusion in Lake Tahoe. He also completed most of the other hardest routes in the US at the time including Equinox 5.13a (7c+) in Joshua Tree, and Cosmic Debris 5.13a (7c+) in Yosemite. On a 1984, visit to the Shawangunks he repeated Intruders and Project X. On a 1986 trip, Güllich made his iconic free solo of Separate Reality, 7a (5.11d), in Yosemite, photographed by Heinz Zak. Güllich travelled extensively including to China, the USSR and to the Sinai Desert. On a 1986 trip to Britain, he did the world's first-ever free solo at 7c (5.12d) on Weed Killer at Raven Tor, but broke his back falling on Master's Edge at Millstone.

In 1984, Güllich would begin a series of years where he would create several hardest new grade sport climbs in the world – the most of any climber in history. He started by redpointing the first-ever 8b (5.13d) X, in history with Kanal im Rücken. The next year, on a trip to Australia, he redpointed the first-ever 8b+ (5.14a) X+ in history with Punks in the Gym. In 1987, Güllich redpointed the first-ever 8c (5.14b) XI- in history with Wallstreet. In 1991, he made the first-ever redpoint of a 9a (5.14d) XI, in history with Action Directe, which was described as "Güllich's Masterpiece". In 2019, Francis Sanzaro, the editor of Rock & Ice, called the 1991 photograph of Güllich, mid-flight on the crux dyno of Action Directe, as "the most iconic photo of hard climbing ever taken".

In addition to driving new grades of sport climbing routes, in 1989, Güllich, Kurt Albert, Christof Stiegler, and Milan Sykora, added what was called a "milestone" in big wall climbing with the first ascent of Eternal Flame (IX- A2) on the Nameless Tower in the Karakoram. In 1991, with Kurt Albert, Bernd Arnold, Norbert Bätz and Peter Dittrich, they made another breakthrough in big wall climbing with Riders on the Storm (IX A3) on the Paine Towers in Patagonia. Güllich believed high altitude big wall climbing was in its early stages, and the expeditions allowed him to recharge from sport climbing.

=== Approach and philosophy ===
Güllich avoided the competition climbing circuit throughout his career. He felt that "competitions are good for earning money, I see it as nothing more", and was not attracted to competing with other climbers, just with the challenge of a real route. Although Güllich enjoyed traveling to other locations and testing himself on their hardest routes, saying: "A 'successful' climber is someone who has done many hard routes in many areas, not just a local specialist", he was most motivated by creating new routes, saying: "if climbing is an art, then creativity is its main component".

Güllich maintained an intensive and scientific approach to training for climbing, sometimes taking on specific training techniques for individual climbs. While training for Action Directe, Güllich invented the campus boarding to develop plyometric strength in his fingers and arms. Güllich co-authored with Andreas Kubin a 192-page German book on training for sport climbing called Sportklettern heute (1986), and was an early advocate of bouldering as a way to improve his technique and build performance, saying "the hardest routes are extended boulder problems"; he also studied the use of the "deadpoint". Güllich's advice would often extend beyond the physical, and was a source of notable quotes including: "A man doesn't go to drink coffee after climbing, coffee is integral part of the climbing".

== Personal life and death ==
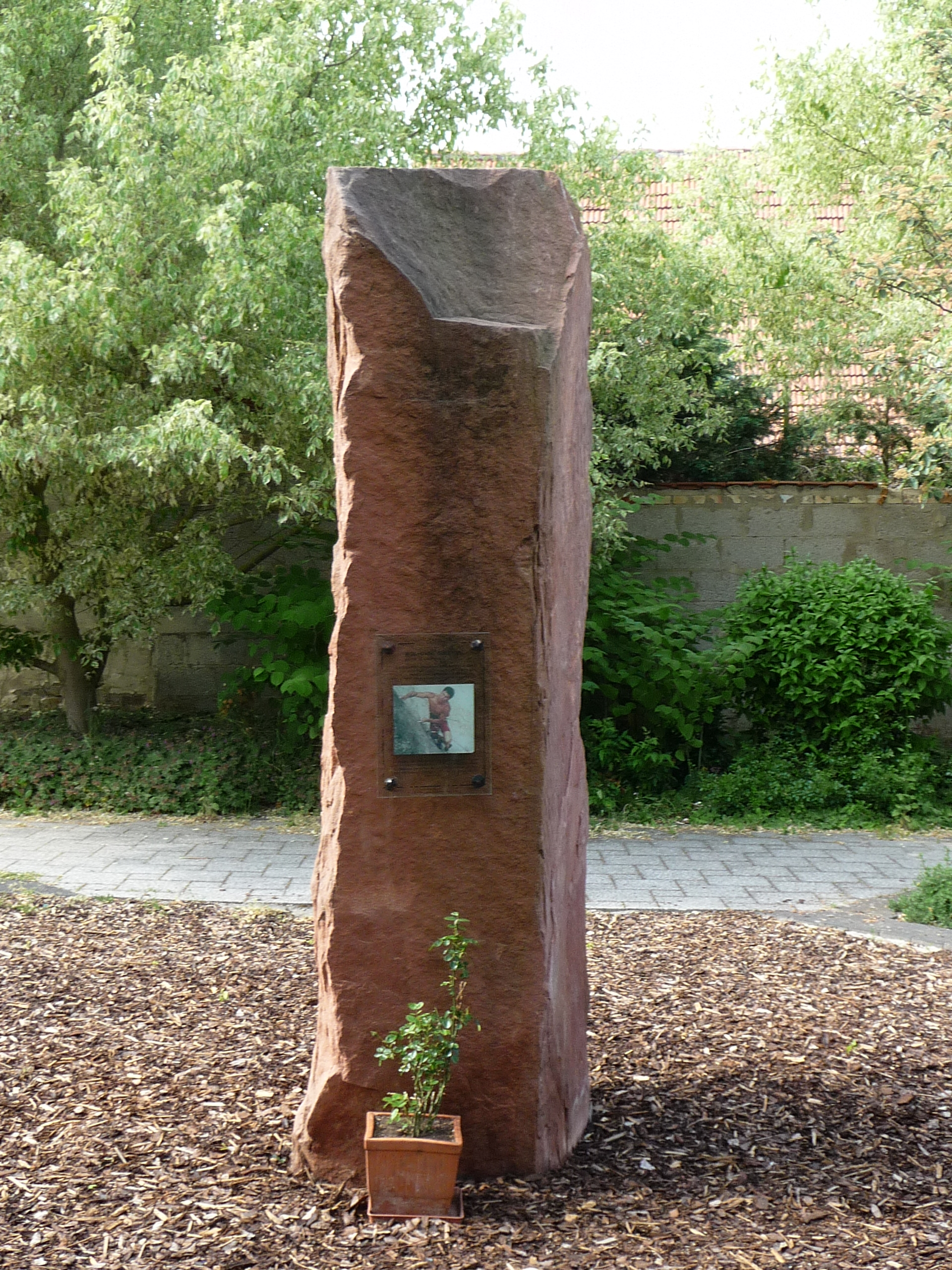
Wolfgang Güllich memorial stone

After moving to the Frankenjura in 1981, Güllich spent eleven years sharing an apartment, which included a gym in the cellar, with his life-long climbing partner Kurt Albert. The pair became famous for their hospitality and generosity to other international sport climbers. The Guardian said: "Their flat became a meeting house for climbers from all over the world, testament to the ability of both men to make friends wherever they went". Climbing said of their apartment, "[it] became one of the most significant addresses in free-climbing history. It was essentially an open-house for the best sport climbers of the 1980s, people like Ben Moon, Ben Masterson, Ron Fawcett, Ron Kauk and John Bachar", and adding: "in an era before the Internet, their place was a hub of ideas and information".

In 1990, he met nurse Annette Favery whom he married one year later; Annette was photographed belaying him on his famous first free ascent of Action Directe on 14 September 1991; which happened just five days after their wedding.

He was a climbing double for Sylvester Stallone in the 1993 movie Cliffhanger, along with Ron Kauk.

On 29 August 1992 Güllich fell asleep at the wheel of his car and veered off the autobahn between Munich and Nuremberg as he made his way home from an interview. Two days later on 31 August 1992 he died in a hospital in Ingolstadt, never having regained consciousness. He was buried in Obertrubach.

== Legacy ==
Güllich is considered one of the greatest and most influential climbers in the history of the sport, and a pioneer in both technique and training. In 2013, when National Geographic announced Adam Ondra as an "Adventurer of the Year", they noted that the title of "world's strongest climber" was held by Güllich in the 1980s and early 1990s, then passed to Chris Sharma in 2001, and to Ondra in 2013; National Geographic said of Güllich: "In the '80s and early '90s German climber Wolfgang Güllich almost singlehandedly bumped the highest grade in rock climbing from 5.13d to 5.14d". In 2018, when Beth Wald wrote a preface to her 1987 Climbing interview with Güllich for the book Vantage Point: 50 Years of the Best Climbing Stories Ever Told, she introduced him as: "One of the finest rock climbers of all time the German Wolfgang Güllich developed cutting-edge training regimes that today have become commonplace...". In 2022, on the 30th anniversary of his death, PlanetMountain called him: "A truly visionary figure, his influence extends well beyond sport climbing and even today his routes in far-flung corners of the globe such as Patagonia and the Karakorum are considered absolute milestones in big wall climbing in the high mountains". In 2022, Die Zeit called Güllich, "One of the best unknown athletes that have ever existed in Germany", noting that rock climbing was still a developing sport in the country.

== Awards and honours ==
- In 1985, Güllich, received the Silbernes Lorbeerblatt, Germany's highest sports award along with Kurt Albert, and Sepp Gschwendtner.
- In 1997, German Beat Kammerlander named one of Europe's hardest big wall routes in Rätikon, Switzerland, WoGü, after Güllich.

== Notable ascents ==
=== Redpointed routes ===
9a (5.14d):

- Action Directe – Waldkopf, Frankenjura (GER) – 1991. First Ascent and world's first-ever 9a (5.14d) XI route. Considered the "benchmark" 9a and an important and historic route.

8c (5.14b):

- Wallstreet – Frankenjura (GER) – 1987. First Ascent and world's first-ever 8c (5.14b) XI- route.

8b+ (5.14a):

- Highlight - Frankenjura (GER) - 1990 - First ascent.
- Level 42 – Frankenjura (GER) – 1987. First Ascent, originally thought to be 8c (5.14b), but now considered an 8b+ / X+.
- Ghettoblaster – Rabentels, Frankenjura (GER) – 1987. First Ascent and the first grade X+ route in Germany at the time.
- Deadline - Frankenjura (GER) - 1986 - First ascent.
- Punks in the Gym – Mount Arapiles (AUS) – 1985. First Ascent and world's first-ever 8b+ (5.14a) X+ route.

8b (5.13d):

- Amadeus Schwarzenegger – Frankenjura (GER) – 1986. First Ascent.
- Kanal im Rücken – Frankenjura (GER) – 1984. First Ascent and world's first-ever 8b (5.13d) X route.

8a (5.13b):

- Grand Illusion – Sugar Loaf, Lake Tahoe, CA (United States) – 1982. First repeat of Tony Yaniro's historic 1979 8a (5.13b) route.

=== Onsighted routes ===
7c+ (5.13a):

- Yesterday Direct – Mount Arapiles (AUS) – 1985. Third-ever 7c+ (Australia 28) onsight in history.

=== Free soloed routes ===
7c (5.12d):

- Weed Killer – Raven Tor, Peak District (ENG) – 1986. Güllich made the world's first-ever free solo of a 7c (5.12d) graded route.

7b+ (5.12c):

- Sautanz – Frankenjura (GER) – 1986. First free solo of the route.

7a (5.11d):

- Separate Reality – Yosemite (United States) – 1986. Photographed by Heinz Zak, Güllich's free solo of Ron Kauk's famous 1978 roof route became an iconic moment in free-climbing history.

=== Big wall climbing routes ===
- Riders on the Storm (Paine Towers, Patagonia, VI 5.12d A3) – 1991.
- Eternal Flame (Nameless Tower, Karakoram, VI, 7b+, A2) – 1989.
- Yugoslavian route (Nameless Tower, Karakoram, 5.12) – 1988. First fully free ascent on the tower.

== Bibliography ==
- Güllich, Wolfgang; Kubin, Andreas (1986). Sportklettern heute. Bruckmann. ISBN 9783765420535.
- Hepp, Tilmann (1994). Wolfgang Gullich: A Life in the Vertical. Boulder. ISBN 9781871890686.
- Zak, Heinz (1997). Rock Stars: The World's Best Free Climbeers. Cordee. ISBN 9783763370443.
- Hepp, Tilmann (2009). Wolfgang Gullich: Action Directe. Vantage. ISBN 9788885475762.

== Filmography ==
- Documentary on German sport climbing: Chelsea Jolly, Ken Etzel (2019). Rotpunkt (Motion picture). Patagonia.
- Documentary on Güllich and Action Directe: Jochen Schmoll, Malte Roeper (2002). Jung stirbt, wen die Götter lieben (Motion picture). BR / Drehxtrem.
- Film in which Güllich acted as a stunt double for Sylvester Stallone: Renny Harlin (1993). Cliffhanger (Motion picture). RCS Video.
- Documentary on Güllich and Kurt Albert climbing in the US: Hans Henn (1987). Den Fels im Griff (Motion picture). ZDF.

== See also ==
- List of grade milestones in rock climbing
- History of rock climbing
- Catherine Destivelle, one of the greatest female sport climbers of the 1980s
- Lynn Hill, one of the greatest female sport climbers of the 1980s and early 1990s
