= Ben Moon (climber) =

British rock climber

Personal information
- Nationality: British
- Born: 13 June 1966 (age 60) London
- Website: www.moonclimbing.com

Climbing career
- Type of climber: Sport climbing, bouldering
- Highest grade: Redpoint: 9a (5.14d); Bouldering: 8B+ (V14)
- Retired from competition: 2003
- Known for: First to climb consensus 8c+ (5.14c)
- Updated on 13 May 2013

Ben Moon (born 13 June 1966) is a rock climber from England. During the late 1980s and early 1990s, Moon, along with climbing partner Jerry Moffatt, were the two strongest British rock climbers and were key pioneers in the development of standards in international sport climbing. In 1990, Moon made the first-ever redpoint in history of a consensus grade 8c+ (5.14c) climbing route with his ascent of Hubble.

== Climbing career ==
Moon's first officially declared 8c (5.14b) routes had somewhat controversial names. The routes were both in France and had been previously attempted for a long time by local climbers. After climbing them Moon named them after French military disasters, first the Maginot Line, at Volx, and secondly Agincourt, at Buoux. On 8 June 2015, Moon redpointed the Steve McClure route Rainshadow, 9a (5.14d), at Malham Cove in North Yorkshire, England.

== Business ventures ==
In 2002, Moon founded his climbing clothing and equipment company, Moon Climbing, after splitting from his previous company, S7. One of Moon Climbing's most popular products is the MoonBoard; a range of standardised overhanging climbing walls used for training.

== Notable ascents ==
- Statement of Youth 8a (5.13b), Lower Pen Trwyn (UK), first ascent (1984)
- Hubble 8c+ (5.14c), Raven Tor (UK), first ascent (1990)
- Voyager (low start) 8B+ (V14), Burbage (UK), first ascent (2006)
- Rainshadow 9a (5.14d), Malham Cove (UK), repeat ascent (2015)

== Filmography ==
- One Summer, Bouldering In The Peak (1994)
- The Real Thing (1996)
- Hard Grit (1998)
- Stick it (2001)
- Stone Love (2001)
- Winter Sessions (2006)

== Bibliography ==
- Douglas, Ed (2015). Statement: The Ben Moon Story. Vertebrate Publishing. ISBN 978-1906148980.

== See also ==
- List of grade milestones in rock climbing
- History of rock climbing
- Ron Fawcett
