= Buoux =

- Commune
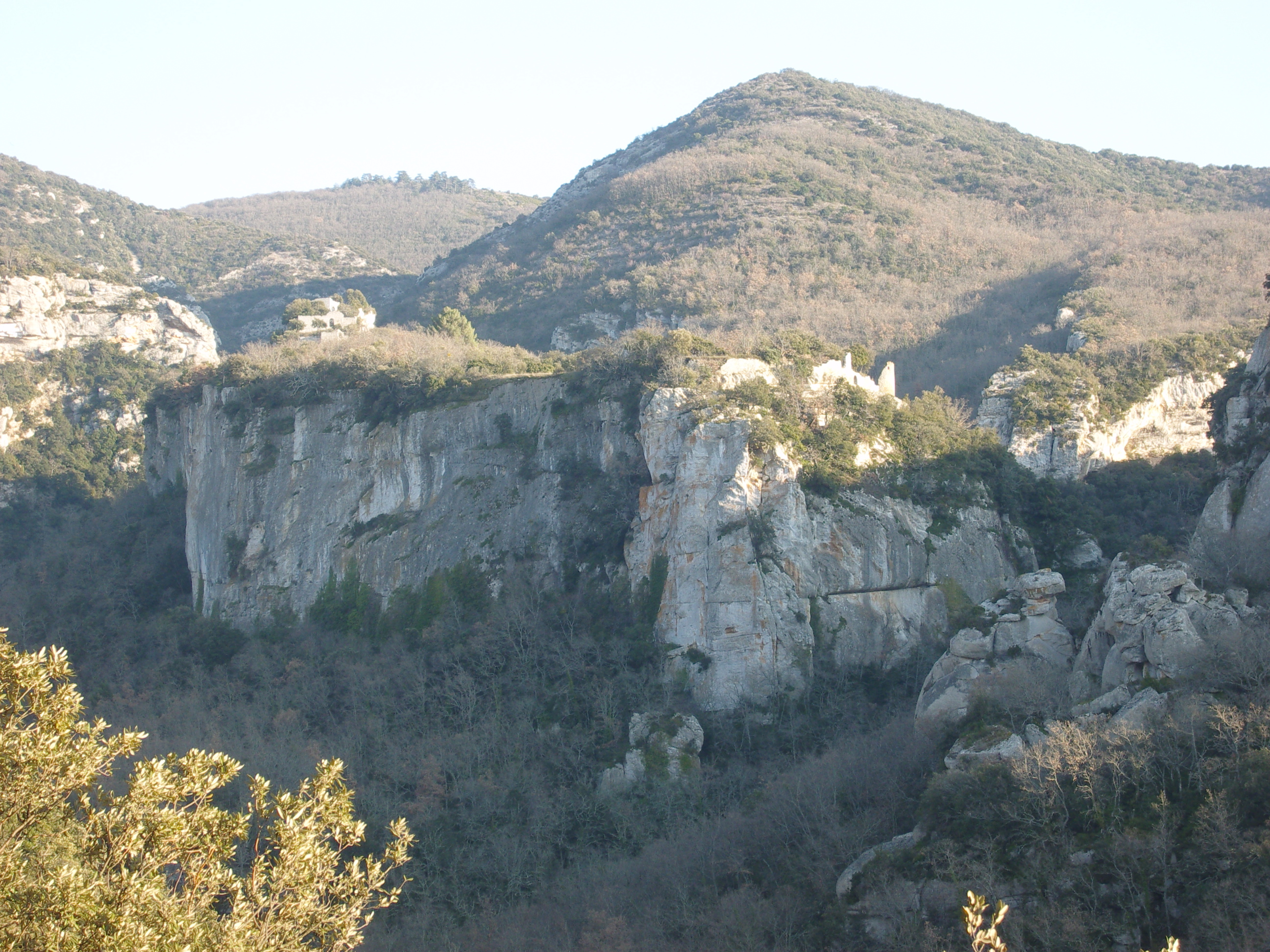
- Site of the Fort de Buoux

- Coat of arms
- Location of Buoux
- Location within France Location within Provence-Alpes-Côte d'Azur
- Coordinates: 43°49′55″N 5°22′42″E
- Country: France
- Region: Provence-Alpes-Côte d'Azur
- Department: Vaucluse
- Arrondissement: Apt
- Canton: Apt

Government
  - Mayor (2020–2026): Amélie Pessemesse
- Area^{1}: 17.54 km^{2} (6.77 sq mi)
- Highest elevation: 902 m (2,959 ft)
- Lowest elevation: 253 m (830 ft)
- Population (2023): 104
  - Density: 5.93/km^{2} (15.4/sq mi)
- Time zone: UTC+01:00 (CET)
  - Summer (DST): UTC+02:00 (CEST)
- INSEE/Postal code: 84023 /84480
- ^{1} French Land Register data, which excludes lakes, ponds, glaciers > 1 km^{2} (0.386 sq mi or 247 acres) and river estuaries.

Buoux (French pronunciation: [bɥuks]; Occitan: Buòus) is a commune in the Vaucluse department in the Provence-Alpes-Côte d'Azur region in southeastern France.

Located on the north side of the Luberon, the town is known for the high cliffs that surround it, making it a popular venue for rock-climbing enthusiasts, as well as the ruins of a medieval fort that was built in the 13th century and destroyed in 1660. The town's population peaked in the mid 19th century with 244 inhabitants in 1836 before falling to only 44 people in 1961. The population has since rebounded some to 122 in 2006.

Buoux has few industries, including tourism, with several bed-and-breakfasts and restaurants, and agriculture, with production of lavender, honey and truffles.

== See also ==
- Communes of the Vaucluse department
- Céüse, leading limestone rock climbing crag in France
- Verdon Gorge, leading limestone rock climbing crag in France
