= Adam Ondra =

Czech climber (born 1993)

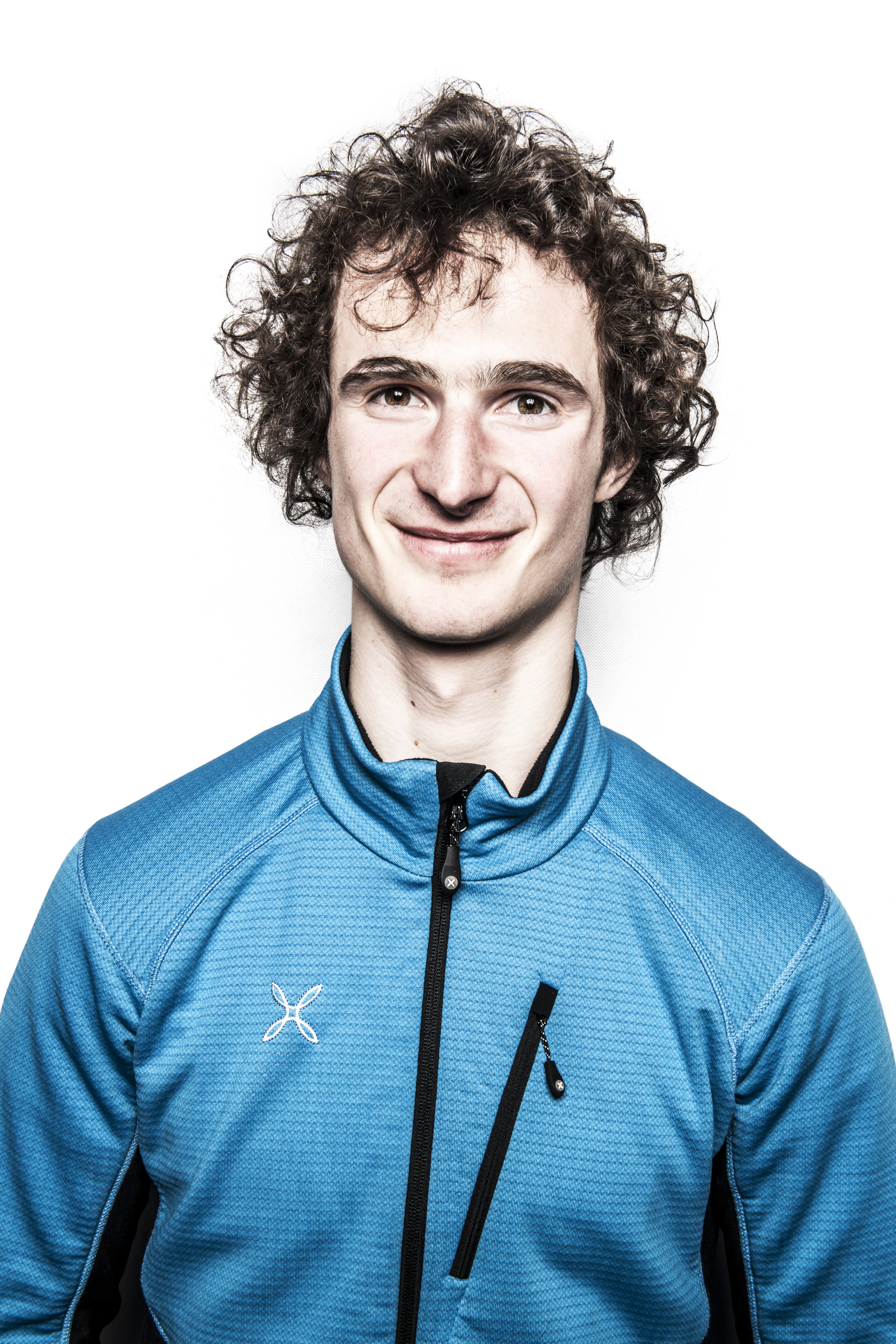
- Ondra in 2018

Personal information
- Born: February 5, 1993 (age 33) Brno, Czech Republic
- Education: Masaryk University
- Occupation: Professional Rock Climber
- Height: 186 cm (6 ft 1 in)
- Weight: 70 kg (154 lb)
- Spouse: Iva Ondra
- Children: 1
- Website: adamondra.com

Climbing career
- Type of climber: Sport Climbing; Bouldering; Competition climbing; Big wall climbing
- Ape index: +1cm (0.4 in)
- Highest grade: Redpoint: 9c (5.15d); Onsight/Flash: 9a+ (5.15a) (as flash); Bouldering: 9A (V17)
- First ascents: Silence (9c, 2017); La Dura Dura (9b+, 2013); Change (9b/9b+, 2012); Terranova (V16, 2011)
- Known for: First to climb consensus sport 9b+ (5.15c) and 9c (5.15d); First to flash consensus sport 9a+ (5.15a); First to win the World Championship in bouldering and lead climbing in single year; First to win the World Cup in bouldering and lead climbing
Medal record
Men's competition climbing
Representing Czech Republic
World Championships
Gold medal – first place	2011 Arco	Overall
Gold medal – first place	2014 Gijón	Lead
Gold medal – first place	2014 Munich	Bouldering
Gold medal – first place	2016 Paris	Lead
Gold medal – first place	2019 Hachiōji	Lead
Silver medal – second place	2009 Xining	Lead
Silver medal – second place	2011 Arco	Bouldering
Silver medal – second place	2016 Paris	Bouldering
Silver medal – second place	2018 Innsbruck	Lead
Silver medal – second place	2018 Innsbruck	Combined
Bronze medal – third place	2011 Arco	Lead
Bronze medal – third place	2012 Paris	Lead
World Cup
Gold medal – first place	2009	Lead
Gold medal – first place	2009	Combined
Gold medal – first place	2010	Bouldering
Gold medal – first place	2010	Combined
Gold medal – first place	2015	Lead
Gold medal – first place	2015	Combined
Gold medal – first place	2019	Lead
Silver medal – second place	2019	Bouldering
European Championships
Gold medal – first place	2019 Edinburgh	Lead
Gold medal – first place	2022 Munich	Lead
Silver medal – second place	2010 Imst/Innsbruck	Lead
Silver medal – second place	2010 Imst/Innsbruck	Bouldering
Silver medal – second place	2015 Chamonix	Lead
Silver medal – second place	2015 Innsbruck	Bouldering
Silver medal – second place	2017 Campitello di Fassa	Lead
Silver medal – second place	2022 Munich	Combined
Bronze medal – third place	2022 Munich	Bouldering
- Updated on April 19, 2021

Adam Ondra (Czech pronunciation: [ˈadam ˈondra]; born February 5, 1993) is a Czech professional rock climber, specializing in lead climbing, bouldering, and competition climbing. In 2013, Rock & Ice described Ondra as a prodigy and the leading climber of his generation. Ondra is the only male athlete to have won World Championship titles in both disciplines in the same year (2014) and is one of the two male athletes (alongside Sorato Anraku in 2023) to have won the World Cup series in both disciplines (lead climbing in 2009, 2015, and 2019 and bouldering in 2010).

At age 13, Ondra redpointed his first graded 9a (5.14d) sport route. Rock & Ice noted that by 2011, he was "onsighting 5.14c's by the handful", and by 2013, had "more or less repeated every hard route in the world—easily". By end 2018, Ondra had climbed 1,550 sport routes between grades 8a (5.13b) and 9c (5.15d), of which one was a 9c (5.15d), three were 9b+ (5.15c), and three were onsights of 9a (5.14d).

Ondra is the first climber to redpoint a route with a proposed grade of 9c (5.15d) (Silence, 2017), the first climber to redpoint a 9b+ (5.15c) route (Change, 2012), the first-ever to flash a 9a+ (5.15a) route (Supercrackinette, 2018), and the second ever to onsight a 9a (5.14d) route (Cabane au Canada, 2013).

Although primarily known for sport climbing, Ondra has repeated or established difficult big wall climbs, traditional climbs, and boulder problems. Because of his achievements, Ondra is often referred to as the world's strongest climber.

== Climbing career ==
=== Early years ===
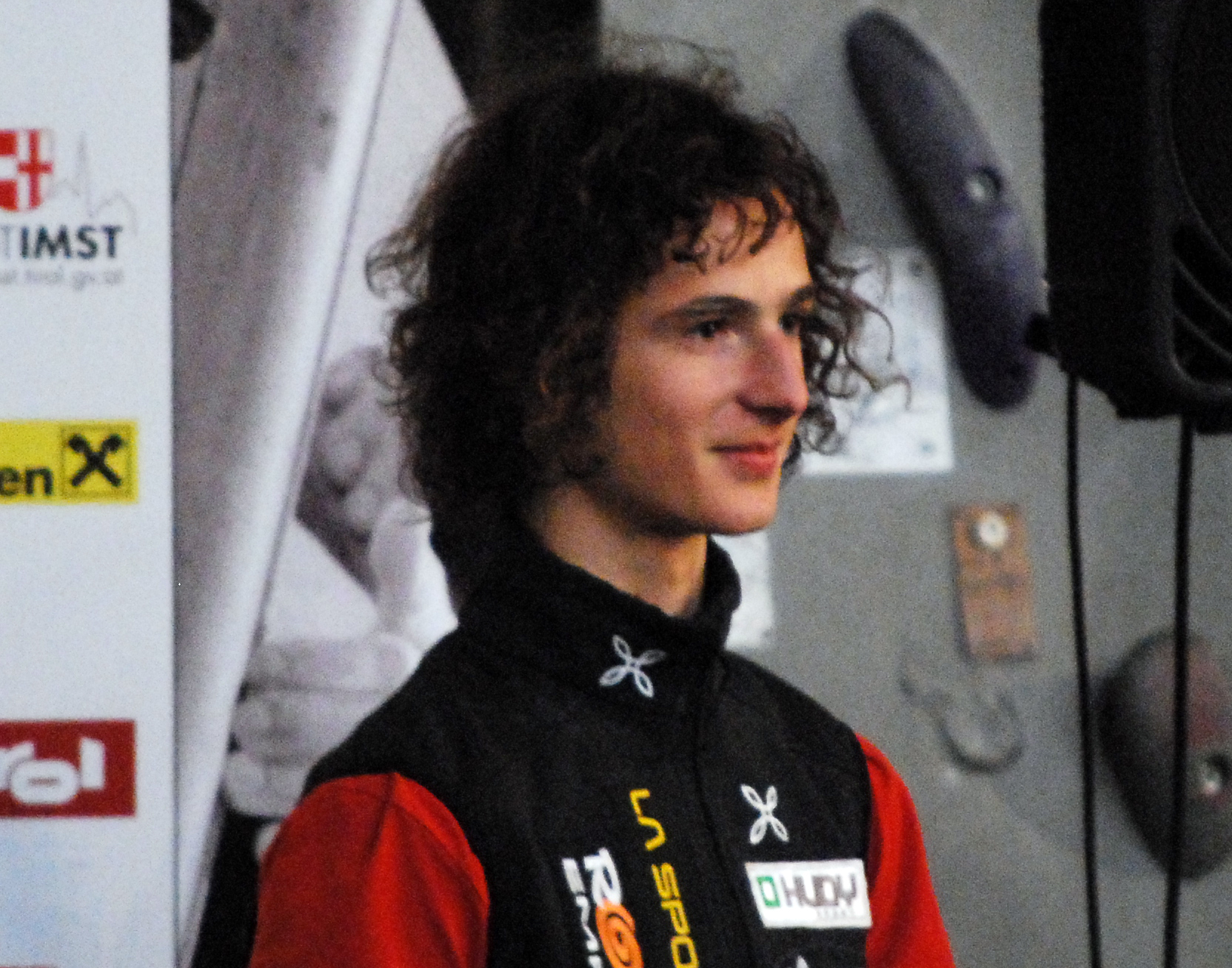
Ondra in 2009 at Imst

Ondra started climbing at the age of six; his parents are climbers, and they shared their passion with him. In 1999, at age six, in Rovinj, Croatia, Ondra climbed a 6a (5.10a) route with bolts every half meter. He quickly rose to fame, appearing in climbing magazines as his accomplishments became both more impressive and frequent:

- In 2001, (at age eight), he onsighted 7b+ (5.12c) routes.
- In 2002, (at age nine), he onsighted 7c+ (5.13a) and redpointed 8a (5.13b).
- In 2003, (at age ten), he onsighted 8a (5.13b).
- In 2004, (at age eleven), he onsighted 8a+ (5.13c) and redpointed 8c (5.14b).
- In 2005, (at age twelve), he onsighted 8b (5.13d).
- In 2006, (at age thirteen), he managed to redpoint his first 9a (5.14d), Martin Krpan at Misja Pec.

=== Competition climbing ===
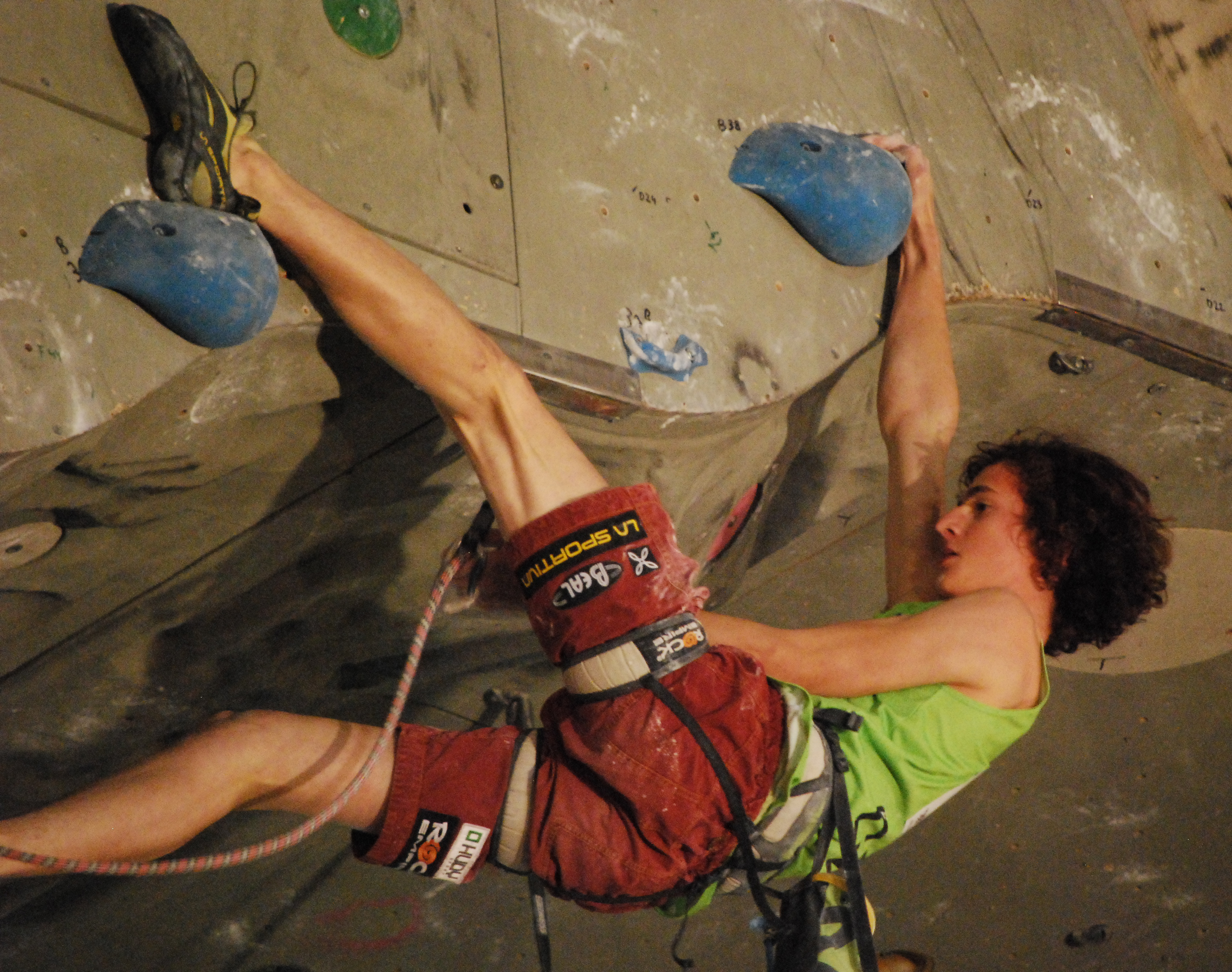
Adam Ondra at the IFSC Lead Worldcup Imst 2009

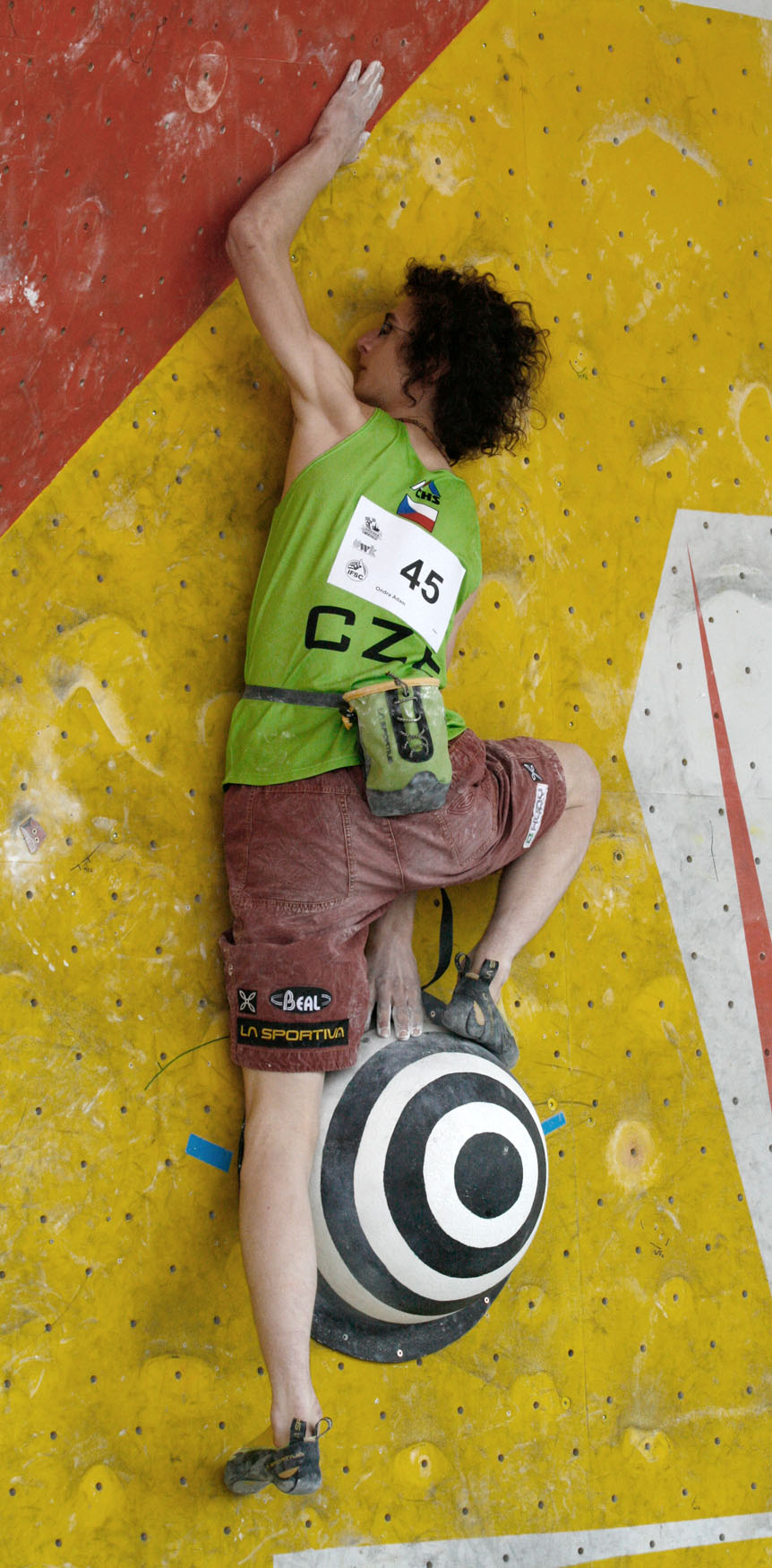
Adam Ondra at the IFSC Boulder Worldcup Vienna 2010

In 2007 and 2008, he won the IFSC World Youth Championship, category Youth B. In 2009, at age sixteen, Ondra competed for the first time in the Lead Climbing World Cup, finishing ahead of Spanish Patxi Usobiaga and Japanese Sachi Amma. In 2010, he won the Bouldering World Cup, beating Austrian climber Kilian Fischhuber and Tsukuru Hori from Japan, becoming the first athlete in history to win the World Cup in both disciplines (lead and bouldering).

Ondra failed to qualify for the 2020 Summer Olympics at the 2019 IFSC Climbing World Championships, as he was disqualified for accidentally toeing a bolt during the lead climbing portion of the combined event. However, at the Olympic qualifying event in Toulouse later that year, he managed to secure a place in the Olympic Games, despite falling ill after reaching the finals of the event.

In April 2021 Ondra won gold in the bouldering discipline at the IFSC World Cup in Meiringen, Switzerland. This marked his 20th World Cup gold medal. Ondra finished in sixth place at the 2020 Summer Olympics in the Boulder, Lead and Speed Combined and also sixth place in the 2024 Summer Olympics Boulder and Lead Combined.

=== Rock climbing ===
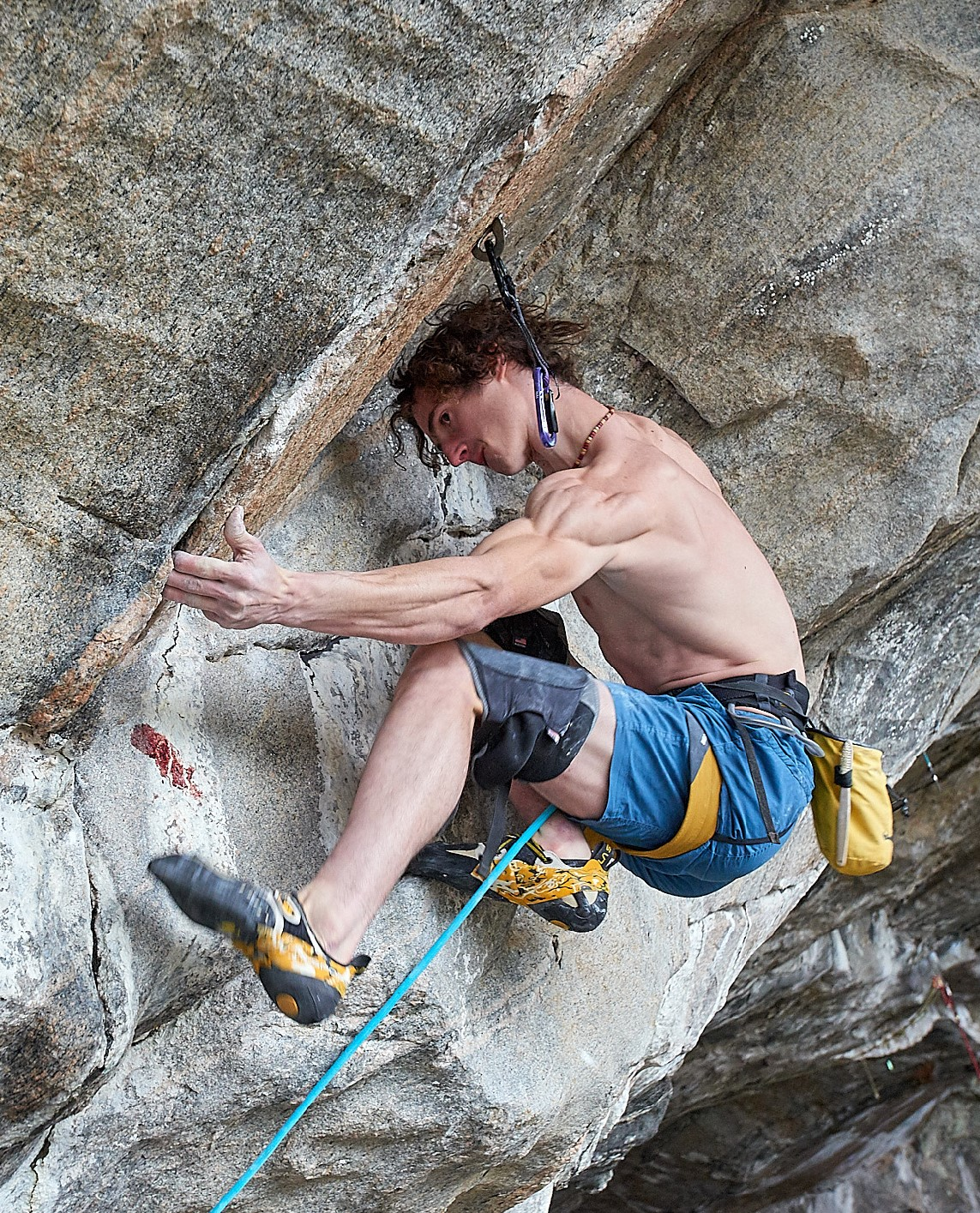
Ondra climbing Silence, 9c (5.15d), in 2017

During a March 2011 trip to Spain, Ondra became the second-ever person to onsight a 8c+ (5.14c) route, after Patxi Usobiaga. On October 4, 2012, Ondra redpointed Change in the Hanshelleren Cave, Flatanger Municipality, Norway, the world's first-ever route to receive a grade of 9b+ (5.15c).

On February 7, 2013, Ondra ascended La Dura Dura in Oliana, Catalonia, Spain, his second 9b+ (5.15c) after Change. He worked on this project with American climber Chris Sharma, and the first ascent took Ondra nine weeks. On February 9, 2013, two days after La Dura Dura, Ondra succeeded in the second ascent of the 9b (5.15b) route, Fight or flight, first climbed by Sharma in 2011. On July 9, 2013, Ondra realized the second-ever onsight of a 9a (5.14d) route in history, after Alexander Megos, with the ascent of Cabane au Canada in Rawyl, Switzerland.

On November 21, 2016, Ondra completed the second free ascent of the 1,000-metre granite route, The Dawn Wall, a 32-pitch grade 5.14d (9a) big wall climbing route at El Capitan in the Yosemite Valley. The route was widely regarded as the hardest big wall climbing route in the world. Ondra led every pitch and completed the project in 8 days (the first ascenders, Tommy Caldwell and Kevin Jorgeson alternated leads, and spent 19 days on the wall).

On April 23, 2017, Ondra set a new highpoint for Black Diamond's The Project indoor sport route in Stockholm, Sweden, which is believed to be the hardest in the world.

On September 3, 2017, after about 4 years of dedicated work and training, Ondra climbed Silence, in the Hanshelleren Cave in Flatanger Municipality, Norway. Silence was the world's first-ever route to have a proposed grade of 9c (5.15d). On February 10, 2018, Ondra completed the world's first-ever flash of a confirmed 9a+ (5.15a) route with his ascent of Super Crackinette in Saint-Léger du Ventoux, France.

== Rankings ==
=== Climbing World Cup ===
Discipline	2009	2010	2011	2012	2013	2014	2015	2016	2017	2018	2019	2021	2022	2023	2024
Lead	1	3	57	-	11	3	1	23	27	31	1	31	19	22	35
Bouldering	15	1	-	-	-	24	3	-	-	-	2	3	-	20	32
Speed	-	-	-	-	-	-	-	-	-	-	-	-	-	-	-
Combined	1	1	-	-	-	2	1	-	65	-	2	-	-	-	-

=== Climbing World Championships ===
Youth

Discipline	2007 Youth B	2008 Youth B	2009 Youth A
Lead	1	1	1

Adult

Discipline	2009	2011	2012	2014	2016	2018	2019	2023	2025
Lead	2	3	3	1	1	2	1	8	15
Bouldering	-	2	-	1	2	17	6	8	-
Speed	-	70	-	-	-	81	58	-	-
Combined	-	-	-	-	-	2	18	6	-

=== Climbing European Championships ===
Discipline	2010	2013	2015	2017	2019	2022
Lead	2	-	2	2	1	1
Bouldering	2	-	2	-	-	3

=== Rock Master ===
Discipline	2009	2010	2011	2012	2013	2014	2015	2016
Lead	3	3		5				-
Duel			1	2		-	1	1
KO Boulder	-	-	-	-	-	-	-	1

== Number of medals in the Climbing European Youth Cup ==
=== Lead ===
Season	Category	Gold	Silver	Bronze	Total
2007	Youth B	5			5
2008	Youth B	5			5
Total		10	0	0	10

== Number of medals in the Climbing World Cup ==
=== Lead ===
Season	Gold	Silver	Bronze	Total
2009	4			4
2010	1	1	1	3
2011; 2012				0
2013	1	1		2
2014	3			3
2015	2	2		4
2016				0
2017		1		1
2018				0
2019	3			3
2020	1			1
2021				0
2022	1			1
2023		1		1
Total	16	6	1	23

=== Bouldering ===
Season	Gold	Silver	Bronze	Total
2009			1	1
2010	3	2		5
2011; 2012; 2013				0
2014		1		1
2015			2	2
2016; 2017; 2018				0
2019	1	2		3
2021	2			2
2022				0
2023		1		1
Total	6	6	3	15

== Single-pitch routes ==
The table below shows the large number of routes graded 8a (5.13b) or more ascended by Adam Ondra in about 16 years, from August 2, 2002 (when he redpointed his first 8a) to November 10, 2018. The total number is 1554, of which one was at 9c (5.15d) and 725 were onsighted, including four onsights at 9a (5.14d) and one flash at 9a+ (5.15a).

Number of ascended routes
Grade	Redpoint	Flash	On-sight	Total
9c (5.15d)	1			1
9b+ (5.15c)	4			4
9b (5.15b)	20			20
9a+ (5.15a)	39	1		40
9a (5.14d)	101	2	4	107
8c+ (5.14c)	124	1	21	146
8c (5.14b)	110	1	61	172
8b+ (5.14a)	96	4	85	185
8b (5.13d)	108	19	143	270
8a+ (5.13c)	82	17	207	306
8a (5.13b)	65	35	205	305
Total	750	80	725	1555

=== Redpoint ===
9c (5.15d):

- Silence (originally known as Project hard) - Flatanger Municipality (NOR) - September 3, 2017 - First ascent, and world's first-ever proposed 9c (5.15d) route (the grade has to be confirmed).

9b+ (5.15c):

- Zvěřinec (Menagerie) - Holštejn (CZE) - November 20, 2022 - First ascent - Adam claims this as his hardest 9b+ and therefore the second hardest route of his life.
- Vasil Vasil - Sloup v Čechách (CZE) - December 4, 2013 - First ascent
- La Dura Dura - Oliana (ESP) - February 7, 2013 - First ascent
- Change - Flatanger (NOR) - October 4, 2012 - First ascent, and the world's first-ever 9b+ (5.15c) route.

9b (5.15b):

- B je to! - Vranjača (CRO) - September 28, 2023 - First ascent
- Wonderland - Arco (ITA) - March 2022 - First ascent. Ondra graded the route 9b/9b+ or hard 9b.
- Bomba - Arco (ITA) - March 2022 - First ascent
- The Lonely Mountain - Arco (ITA) - December 2021. Second ascent after Stefano Ghisolfi.
- Taurus - Býčí skála (CZE) - December 2021 - First Ascent
- Erebor - Arco (ITA) - November 2021
- Neanderthal - Santa Linya (ESP) - February 12, 2019
- Disbelief - Acephale (CAN) - July 20, 2018 - First ascent
- Eagle-4 - St. Léger (FRA) - February 13, 2018 - First ascent
- One Slap - Arco (ITA) - November 13, 2017 - First ascent
- Move Hard - Flatanger (NOR) - July 10, 2017 - First ascent (link-up of two neighboring routes; through first crux of Move into second crux of Silence, at the time known as Project Hard)
- Lapsus - Andonno (ITA) - April 20, 2017 - Second ascent
- Queen Line - Laghel (Arco, ITA) - April 19, 2017 - First ascent
- Mamichula - Oliana (ESP) - February 8, 2017 - First ascent
- Robin Ud - Alternativna stena (SVK) - October 5, 2016 - First ascent
- Stoking the Fire - Santa Linya (ESP) - February 19, 2016 - Second ascent of Chris Sharma's route
- C.R.S. - Mollans sur Ouvèze (FRA) - November 2, 2015 - First ascent
- First Round First Minute - Margalef (ESP) - February 3, 2014 - Second ascent of Chris Sharma's route
- Move - Flatanger (NOR) - August 20, 2013 - First ascent. Ondra graded the route "9b/9b+, or just hard 9b". Repeated on June 17, 2019 by Seb Bouin, who later on upgraded the route to 9b+.
- Iron Curtain - Flatanger (NOR) - August 3, 2013 - First ascent
- Fight or flight - Oliana (ESP) - February 9, 2013 - Second ascent of Chris Sharma's route (2011)
- La planta de Shiva - Villanueva del Rosario (ESP) - April 22, 2011 - First ascent
- Chilam Balam -Villanueva del Rosario (ESP) - April 13, 2011 - Second ascent (however Bernabe Fernandez's first ascent is not confirmed)
- Chaxi Raxi - Oliana (ESP) - March 27, 2011 - First ascent of Chaxi direct start
- La Capella - Siurana (ESP) - February 16, 2011 - First ascent
- Golpe de Estado - Siurana (ESP) - March 13, 2010 - Second ascent of Chris Sharma's route (2008)

9a+ (5.15a):

- El Maquinista - Montanejos (ESP) - November 12, 2023 - First ascent
- Chicken Nose - Isenfluh (SUI) - November 4, 2023 - First ascent
- Fantazija! - Ter (SLO) - October 1, 2023 - First ascent
- A je to! - Vranjača (CRO) - August 31, 2023 - First ascent
- Bombardino - Bus de la Stria (ITA) - February 23, 2022
- Trofeo dell'Adriatico - Bus de la Stria (ITA) - January 27, 2022
- Furia de Jabali - Siurana (ESP) - January 19, 2022
- Kout pikle - (Moravsky Kras, CZE) - December 18, 2021 - First Ascent
- Molekuly - (Moravsky Kras, CZE) - October 26, 2021 - First Ascent
- Bohemian Rhapsody - Velká (CZE) - April, 2020 - First Ascent
- Qui - Geisterschmiedwand (AUT) - September 19, 2019 - Second ascent
- Catxasa - Santa Linya (ESP) - February 10, 2019
- Czech trip - Mavrovi Anovi (MKD) - October 19, 2018 - First Ascent
- High Line - Kanjon Tijesno (BiH) - September 25, 2018
- Sacrifice - Echo Canyon (CAN) - July 23, 2018 - First ascent
- Stone Butterfly - Herculane (ROU) - May 15, 2018 - First ascent
- Underground Dreaming - Arco (ITA) - February 24, 2018 - First ascent
- Super Crackinette - Saint-Léger du Ventoux (FRA) - February 10, 2018 - Flash
- La Castagne - Saint-Léger du Ventoux (FRA) - February 2, 2018
- Meiose - Charmey (CHE) - January 27, 2018
- One Punch - Arco (ITA) - November 13, 2017
- Naturalmente - Camaiore (ITA) - April 21, 2017 - First ascent
- Ultimatum - Massone (Arco, (ITA) - April 19, 2017 - third ascent
- Hyper Finale - Ayent, Rawyl (CHE) - July 17, 2016
- 120 Degrees - Flatanger (NOR) - June 19, 2016
- Vicious Circle - Osp (SLO) - March 25, 2016
- Predator - Bohemian Karst (CZE) - November 19, 2015 - first ascent, the hardest route in Bohemia
- Three Degrees of Separation - Céüse (FRA) - July 27, 2015 - second ascent of Chris Sharma's route (2007)
- Realization - Céüse (FRA) - July 22, 2014 - tenth ascent
- Ini Ameriketan - Baltzola (ESP) - May 9, 2014
- Hell Racer - Hell (NOR) - September 22, 2013 - first ascent
- Kangaroo's Limb - Flatanger (NOR) - September 21, 2013 - first ascent
- Torture Physique Integrale - Gastlosen (CHE) - July 7, 2013 - first ascent
- Power Inverter - Oliana (ESP) - January 25, 2013 - second ascent of Chris Sharma's route (2010)
- Thor's Hammer - Flatanger (NOR) - July 8, 2012 - first ascent (now downgraded to 9a)
- Jungle Boogie - Céüse (FRA) - June 7, 2012 - first ascent
- Perlorodka - Holstejn (Moravsky Kras, CZE) - September 6, 2011 - first ascent
- Overshadow - Malham Cove (GBR) - May 16, 2011 - Second ascent of Steve McClure's route
- Chaxi - Oliana (ESP) - March 21, 2011 - first ascent of Chris Sharma's project
- Obrint el sistema - Santa Ana (ESP) - March 14, 2011 - first ascent of Daniel Andrada's project
- L'étrange ivresse des lenteurs - Céüse (FRA) - September 4, 2010 - First ascent
- Goldrake - Cornalba (ITA) - April 6, 2010 - first ascent
- Marina Superstar - Domusnovas (ITA) - October 20, 2009 - first ascent
- Corona - Frankenjura (DEU) - June 7, 2009 - second ascent of Markus Bock's route (2006)
- Papichulo - Oliana (ESP) - February 24, 2009 - second ascent of Chris Sharma's route (2008)
- Open Air - Schleierwasserfall (AUT) - November 17, 2008 - second ascent of Alexander Huber's route (1996)
- La Rambla - Siurana (ESP) - February 10, 2008 - sixth ascent

=== On-sight ===
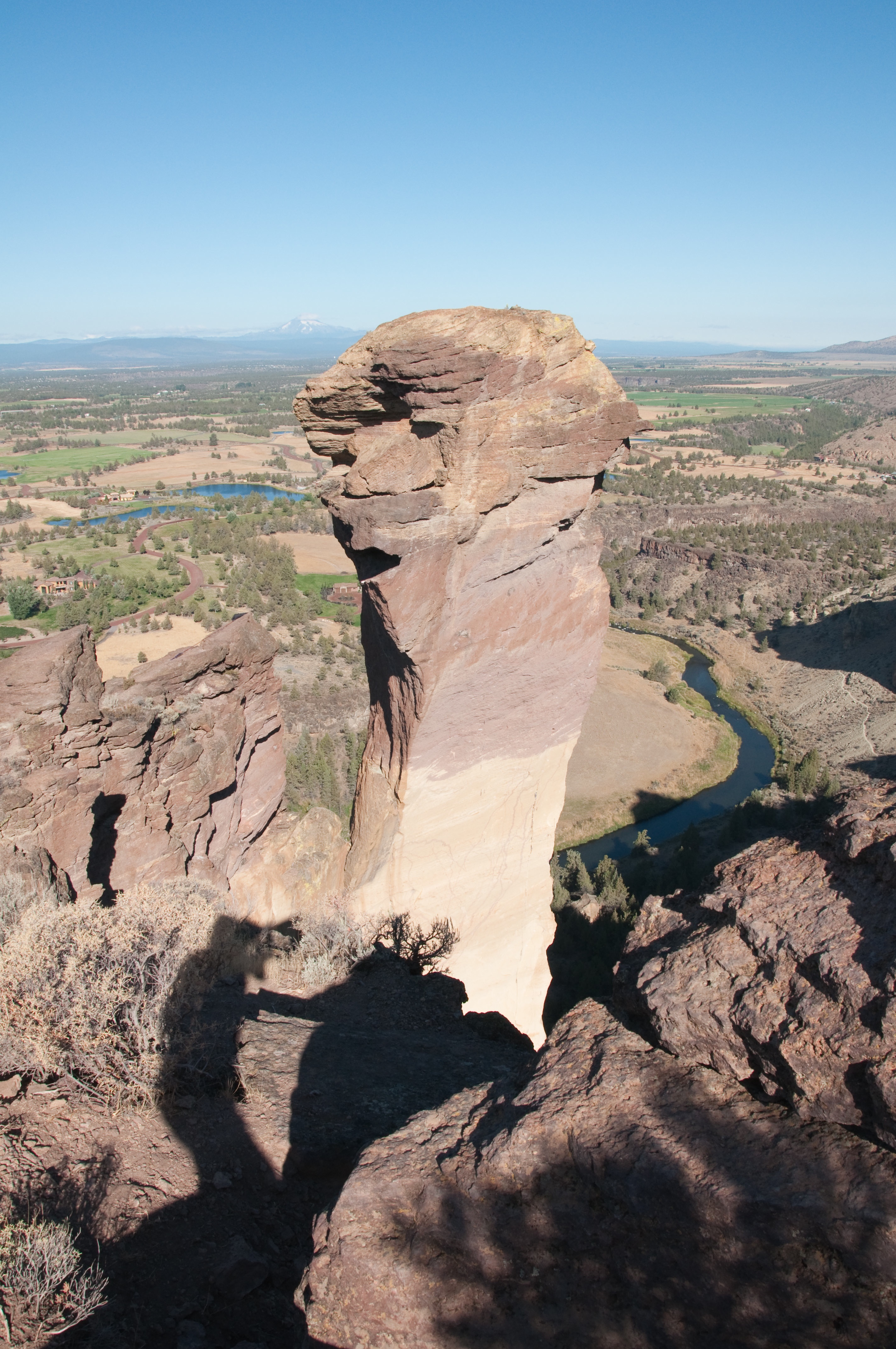
The east face of Monkey Face at Smith Rock, containing Just do it (8c+), onsighted by Ondra in 2018. When it was first ascended by Tribout, Just do it was considered the hardest route in the USA.

9a (5.14d):

- Water World - Osp (SLO) - Nov 2022 -
- TCT - Gravere (ITA) - July 11, 2014
- Il Domani - Baltzola (ESP) - May 3, 2014
- Cabane au Canada - Rawyl (CHE) - July 9, 2013 - Second-ever 9a onsight in history

8c+ (5.14c):

- Blut und Honig - Höllental (AUT) - September 30, 2019
- Just Do It - Smith Rock (Oregon, USA) - November 12, 2018
- C'est la vie - Alternatívna stena (SVK) - October 5, 2016
- Super Plafond - Volx (FRA) - July 6, 2014
- Chambao - Baltzola (ESP) - May 7, 2013
- Pure Imagination - Red River Gorge (USA) - November 1, 2012
- Golden Ticket - Red River Gorge (USA) - November 1, 2012
- Muy Verdes - Flatanger (NOR) - July 11, 2012
- Eye of Odin - Flatanger (NOR) - July 8, 2012
- Deltaplane Man Direct - Entraygues (FRA) - May 31, 2012
- Bella Regis - Bus De Vela (ITA) - April 7, 2012
- L'Avaro - Tetto di Sarre (ITA) - July 13, 2011
- La Rubia - Villanueva del Rosario (ESP) - April 13, 2011
- Blanquita - Oliana (ESP) - March 27, 2011
- Mind Control - Oliana (ESP) - March 20, 2011
- Powerade - Vadiello (ESP) - March 9, 2011
- Bizi Euskaraz - Etxauri (ESP) - March 7, 2011
- Kidetasunaren balio erantsia - Etxauri (ESP) - March 6, 2011 - Second-ever 8c+ onsight in history after Bizi Euskaraz by Patxi Usobiaga in 2007

8c (5.14b):

- Aktion Talon - Höllental (AUT) - June 29, 2013
- Into the Wild - Jaén (ESP) - March 16, 2013
- Terapia de Grito - Cuenca (ESP) - February 13, 2013
- El Calvario del Sicario - Cuenca (ESP) - February 10, 2013
- Nordic Flower - Flatanger (NOR) - July 9, 2012
- Scoglio de Capri - Bus De Vela (ITA) - April 7, 2012
- Iluzija - Kotecnik (SVN) - April 5, 2012
- 5 Uve - Arco (ITA) - June 27, 2011
- Bat Route - Malham Cove (GBR) - May 16, 2011
- Carbunco - Archidona (ESP) - April 23, 2011
- Kalliste - Archidona (ESP) - April 23, 2011
- Fuck the police - Etxauri (ESP) - March 6, 2011
- Dures Limites - Céüse (FRA) - August 10, 2010
- Smoke - Pierrot beach (FRA) - August 5, 2010
- Home Sweet Home - Pierrot beach (FRA) - August 5, 2010
- Guère d'usure - Claret (FRA) - January 29, 2010
- Super Samson - Claret (FRA) - January 29, 2010
- Gora Guta Gutarak - Kalymnos (GRC) - May 22, 2009
- Una Vida Nomada - Covolo (ITA) - April 21, 2009
- Nagay - Covolo (ITA) - April 21, 2009
- L'espiadimondis - Margalef (ESP) - March 2, 2009
- Los Humildes Pa Casa - Oliana (ESP) - February 24, 2009
- Métaphysique Des Tubes - Seynes (FRA) - February 21, 2009
- Absinth - Sparchen (AUT) - August 16, 2008
- Rollito Sharma Extension - Santa Linya (ESP) - February 7, 2008
- Digital System - Santa Linya (ESP) - February 5, 2008

== Boulder problems ==
Ondra won the bouldering gathering Melloblocco in 2008, 2009 2010 and 2011.

He climbed 293 boulder problems between 8A (V11) and 8C+ (V16). Specifically:

- 2 9A/V17
- 4 8C+/V16
- 20 8C/V15
- 31 8B+/V14
- 57 8B/V13
- 76 8A+/V12
- 115 8A/V11

9A (V17):

- Exodia - Piedmont (ITA) - October 18, 2026
- Soudain Seul - Fontainebleau (FRA) - February 8, 2025

8C+ (V16):

- Brutal Rider - Moravian Karst (CZE) - May 25, 2020 - First ascent
- Ledoborec - Moravian Karst (CZE) - May 24, 2020 - First ascent
- Gioia - Varazze (ITA) - December 6, 2011 - Second ascent of Christian Core's boulder (2008)
- Terranova - Holštejn (Moravian Karst, CZE) - November 10, 2011 - First ascent, traverse

8C/8C+ :

- Pohár Nesmrtelnosti (Prodloužení) - Sloup (Moravian Karst), (CZE) - November 23, 2022 - First ascent
- Vrtule - Holštejn (Moravian Karst, CZE) - October 13, 2017 - First ascent,
- Kráter - Holštejn (Moravian Karst), (CZE) - June 24, 2017 - First ascent

8C (V15):

- Emotional Landscapes - Maltatal, (AUT) - March 11, 2026 - Flash
- Celestite - Val Bavona, (SUI) - February 28, 2026 - Flash
- Captain Nemo - Val Bavona, (SUI) - February 28, 2026
- The Lion's Share - Brione, (SUI) - February 25, 2026 - Flash
- Big Nose - Val de Bagnes, (SUI) - November 2025
- Foundation's Edge - Val de Bagnes, (SUI) - November 12, 2025 - Flash
- Ziqqurat - Gaby, (ITA) - November 5, 2025
- Autofix - Sloup (Moravian Karst), (CZE) - July 20, 2025
- Flow State - Val daone, (ITA) - August 27, 2024
- Sviní Ponor - Sloup (Moravian Karst), (CZE) - April 26, 2020 - First ascent
- Iceberg - (Moravian Karst), (CZE) - April 23, 2020
- Nunavut - Sloup (Moravian Karst), (CZE) - November 15, 2019 - First ascent
- Pučmeloun - Sloup (Moravian Karst), (CZE) - November 15, 2019 - First ascent
- Ghost Rider - (Moravian Karst), (CZE) - September 24, 2019 - Second ascent
- Cháron - Petrohrad (Mlýnský vrch), (CZE) - October 15, 2011 - First ascent
- Practice of the Wild - Magic Wood (CHE) - October 1, 2011 - Chris Sharma's boulder (2004)
- Pata ledovce - Holštejn (Moravian Karst, CZE) - September 6, 2011 - First ascent
- Monkey Wedding - Rocklands (ZAF) - August 14, 2011 - Third ascent of Fred Nicole's boulder (2002)
- From The Dirt Grows the Flowers - Chironico (CHE) - November 30, 2010 - Dave Graham's boulder (2005)
- Big Paw - Chironico (CHE) - November 29, 2010 - Third ascent of Dave Graham's boulder (2008)

== Multi-pitch routes ==
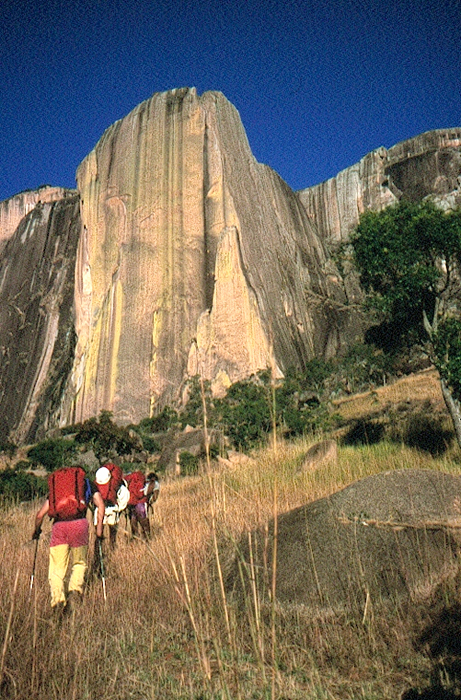
Karambony East Face - Tough Enough route runs in the middle

- The Dawn Wall - El Capitan (USA) - 3,000 feet (915 meters) tall - 32 pitches, at least two of which graded 9a (5.14d). Described as the hardest big wall in the world.

January 14, 2015 - Redpointed by Tommy Caldwell and Kevin Jorgeson in 19 days, after 7 years of mapping.
November 21, 2016 - Redpointed by Adam Ondra in 8 days, after a few weeks of practicing the already mapped ascent.

- Mora Mora - Tsaranoro Atsimo (MDG) - October 10, 2010 - First free ascent
- Bravo Les Filles - Tsaranoro Kelly (MDG) - October 7, 2010
- Tough Enough Original - Karambony (MDG) - October 4, 2010 - First free ascent
- Tough Enough - Karambony (MDG) - September 30, 2010 - First free ascent
- Hotel Supramonte - Gole di Gorroppu (ITA) - October 18, 2008 - First onsight ascent
- Ali Baba - Paroi Derobée (Aiglun, FRA) - 2008 - Second ascent
- WoGü - Rätikon (CHE) - July 26, 2008 - First free ascent of Beat Kammerlander's route (1997)
- Zub za zub - Rätikon (CHE) - July 29, 2007 - First free ascent
- Silbergeier - Rätikon (CHE) - July 27, 2007

== Filmography ==
- The Fanatic Search - 2009 - Produced by Work Less Climb More and Laurent Triay
- Progression - 2009 - by Josh Lowell - Produced by Big UP Productions
- The Wizard's Apprentice - 2012 - Directed by Petr Pavlíček - Produced by Bernartwood - 110'
- Reel Rock Tour 7 - 2012 - Produced by Big UP Productions
- La Dura Complete: The Hardest Rock Climb in the World - 2014 - Part of Reel Rock 7 by Big Up Productions
- Change - 2014 - Directed by Petr Pavlíček - Produced by Bernartwood -
- Silence—The Story of Adam Ondra and the World's First 5.15d - 2018 - by Bernardo Giménez - Produced by AO Production s.r.o.
- Ondra is also producing his own video series about qualifying and competing in the 2020 Summer Olympics, released on YouTube, called Road to Tokyo.

== Books ==
- JAROŠ, Martin; ONDRA, Adam. Adam Ondra: lezec tělem i duší. Albatros, 2019. 200 p.
- ONDRA, Adam; GIMENEZ, Bernardo; BÍBA, Lukáš. Adam Ondra Book. AO Production, 2019. 223 p.

== Awards ==
- 2009 Golden Piton Award
- 2008 Salewa Rock Award
- 2010 Salewa Rock Award
- 2011 Salewa Rock Award
- 2013 Salewa Rock Award

== See also ==
- Sébastien Bouin, French rock climber, frequent climbing-partner with Ondra
- History of rock climbing
- Rankings of most career IFSC gold medals
- List of grade milestones in rock climbing
- Chris Sharma, American rock climber
