= QUI =

Qui or QUI may refer to:

== Music ==
- Qui (band), an American rock group formed in 2000
- Qui ?, a 1963 album by Charles Aznavour
- "Qui...?", a 1989 Belgian novelty song

== Places ==
- Qui (climb), Austria
- Qui, Iran, a village
- Quintrell Downs railway station, Cornwall, England (GBR:QUI)

== Other uses ==
- Qui (Yellowjackets), a 2023 episode of the television drama
- Quileute language, spoken in the United States (ISO 639-3:qui)
