= Martin Krpan (climb) =

Sport climbing route in Slovenia

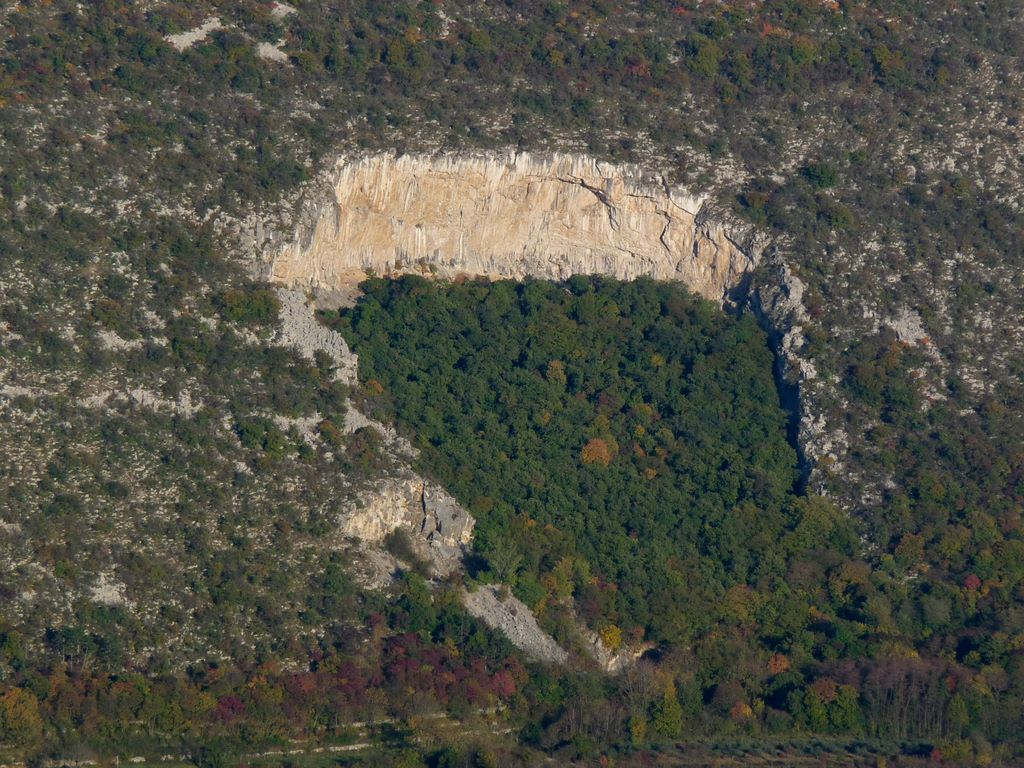
- Martin Krpan (right), on the Mišja Peč crag

- Location within Slovenia
- Location: Osp, Slovenia
- Coordinates: 45.5673°N 13.8642°E
- Climbing area: Mišja Peč
- Route type: Sport climb
- Vertical gain: 28 metres (92 ft)
- Pitches: 1
- Technical grade: 9a (5.14d)? (without kneepads); 8c+ (5.14c) (with knee bars)
- Bolted by: [[]]
- First free ascent: Jure Golob, 4 May 2001
- First female free ascent: Laura Rogora, January 2025

Martin Krpan is a 28-metre (92 ft) sport climb at the limestone Mišja Peč crag in Osp, Slovenia.

== History ==
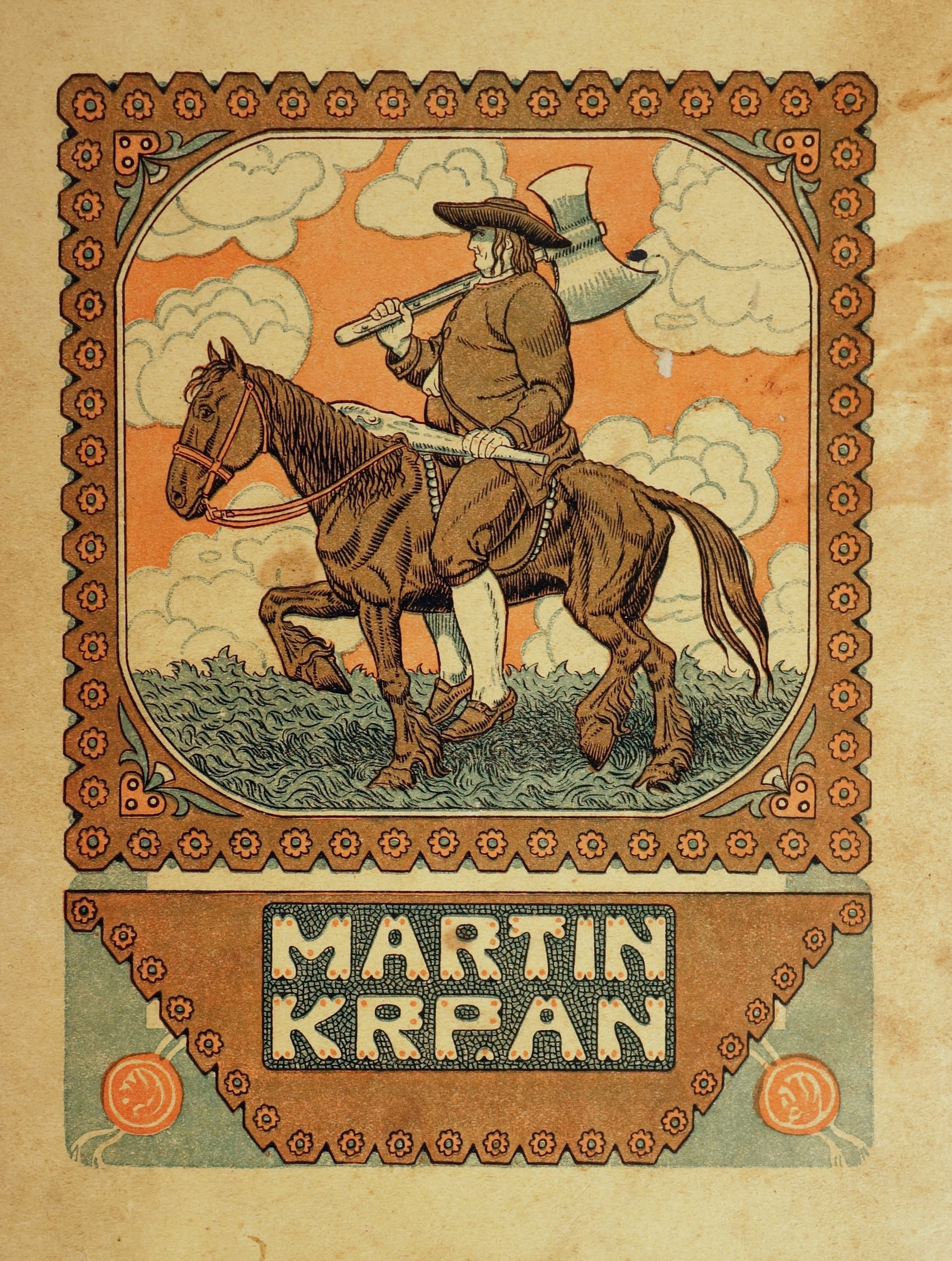
Martin Krpan, namesake of the climb

The climb is named after Martin Krpan, a fictional character created by 19th-century Slovene writer Fran Levstik.

Nico Ferlitsch took 50 day trips over the course of 2 seasons to complete the route. Christian Leitner likewise took 2 seasons. Fedir Samoilov completed the route on his third day of climbing at the crag. Jakob Schubert, who first tried it in 2009, took 4 attempts in 2011 to ascend the route; Pepa Šindel likewise took 4 attempts. Jernej Kruder repeated it without knee pads (which would have helped him rest just before the crux). It took him "many tries". Eliáš Kysela completed Konec Mira in one day and Martin Krpan four days later. Stefano Carnati is the latest to attempt the climb without a knee bar, after several attempts beginning in December, mostly struggling with low temperatures. Kacper Heretyk took about 10 climbing days to ascend the route.

== Route ==
The route is a link up, extending Konec Mira (8c (5.14b)) by beginning in Strelovod (8c (5.14b)). It follows 13 bolts to the top. Climbing the route requires a combination of technique, endurance and precision, including heavy use of heel hooking. Knee bars allow resting at three crucial points, so it is often climbed with knee pads.

== Ascents ==
Martin Krpan has been ascended by:

1. 1st. Jure Golob on 4 May 2001
2. Matej Sova on 19 March 2002
3. Tomáš Mrázek on 5 April 2005
4. Adam Ondra on 11 November 2006
5. Łukasz Dudek on 26 February 2009
6. Domen Škofic on 8 April 2010
7. Mateusz Haładaj on 14 May 2010
8. Mikhail Chernikov on 4 May 2011
9. Jakob Schubert on 21 November 2011
10. Fedir Samoilov on 3 April 2016
11. Nico Ferlitsch on 28 October 2017
12. Matteo Menardi in March 2018
13. Moritz Welt in March 2021
14. Alex Ventajas on 18 January 2022
15. Andrea Chelleris in September 2022
16. Christian Leitner in November 2023
17. Jernej Kruder in December 2023
18. Pepa Šindel on 1 January 2024 (𓂾)
19. Stefano Carnati in February 2024
20. Eliáš Kysela in March 2024
21. 1st Female Free Ascent. Laura Rogora in January 2025 (𓂾)
22. Kacper Heretyk in January 2025 (𓂾)
23. Lovro Črep on 13 October 2025 (𓂾)
24. Lucija Tarkuš in November 2025 (𓂾)

== Bibliography ==
- ClimbIstria (2025-11-21). "Lucija Tarkuš sends her first 9a in Mišja Peč". ClimbIstria.com.
- ClimbIstria (2025-10-15). "Latest sends & Updates from Istria". ClimbIstria.com.
- Heretyk, Kacper (2025-01-10). "Kacper Heretyk does Martin Krpan (9a)" (Interview). Vertical-Life.
- VL (2025-01-05). "Laura Rogora strikes in Misja Pec". Vertical-Life.
- Leitner, Christian (2024-11-13). "Christian Leitner, 15, does Napalm in the morning (9a)" (Interview). Vertical-Life.
- Kysela, Eliáš (2024-03-04). "Elias Kysela, 17, does Martin Krpan (9a)" (Interview). Interviewed by VL. Vertical-Life.
- Carnati, Stefano (2024-02-06). "Stefano Carnati does Martin Krpan (9a)" (Interview). Interviewed by Hobley, Nicholas. Vertical-Life.
- Šindel, Josef (2024b) [2024-01-21]. "Trip to Slovenia part 2 Martin Krpan 9a". YouTube.
- Šindel, Josef (2024a) [2024-01-09]. "Pepa Šindel, 16, sends Martin Krpan (9a)" (Interview). Interviewed by VL. Vertical-Life.
- Kruder, Jernej (2023-12-30). "Jernej Kruder sends Martin Krpan (9a) sans knee pads" (Interview). Interviewed by VL. Vertical-Life.
- Leitner, Christian (2023-11-05). "Martin Krpan 9a (Uncut Ascent)". YouTube.
- Ondra, Adam (2023-03-20). "Water World 9a ONSIGHT". YouTube. Summary published on his official website.
- Chelleris, Andrea (2022b) [2022-09-28]. "Martin krpan 9a". YouTube.
- Chelleris, Andrea (2022a) [2022-09-22]. "Martin Krpan 9a by Andrea Chelleris (13)" (Interview). Vertical-Life.
- Bell, Ricky (2022-01-22). "Alex Ventajas, Jonatan Flor and Tom Bolger on their 9th grade projects". Up-Climbing.com.
- Ventajas, Alex (2022-01-18). "Alex Ventajas en Martín Krpan 9A, Misja Pec, Eslovenia". YouTube.
- Bell, Ricky (2021-03-31). "Moritz Welt has climbed two 9as: Martin Krpan and Halupca 1979". Up-Climbing.com.
- Welt, Moritz (2021-03-22). "(Uncut Ascent) Martin Krpan 9a". YouTube.
- ClimbIstria (2021-03-11). "Moritz Welt in Mišja peč". ClimbIstria.com.
- Ferlitsch, Nico; Ferlitsch, Anika (2018-11-08). "The story of my first 9a climb (Nico Ferlitsch)". YouTube.
- ClimbIstria (2018-03-31). "Easter Holidays". ClimbIstria.com.
- VL (2017-11-02). "First 9a by Nico Ferlitsch (16)". Vertical-Life.
- Ferlitsch, Nico; Ferlitsch, Anika (2017b) [2017-11-03]. "Nico Ferlitsch on "Martin Krpan" (9a)". YouTube.
- Ferlitsch, Nico; Ferlitsch, Anika (2017a) [2017-10-29]. "Martin Krpan (9a) climbed by 16 years old Nico Ferlitsch". YouTube.
- Samoilov, Fedir (2016b) [2016-04-17]. "Martin Krpan (9a) Misja Pec/Slovenia". YouTube. Скалолазы Украины.
- Samoilov, Fedir (2016a) [2016-04-04]. "First 9a by Fedir Samoilov (18)" (Interview). Interviewed by VL. Vertical-Life.
- Kletterszene (2011-11-03). "Roland Hemetzberger erfolgreich in De Hoabuchane (10-/10, 6 SL) und Jakob Schubert wiederholt Martin Krpan (9a)". Kletterszene.com (in German).
- VL (2011-05-04). "9a by Mikhail Chernikov". Vertical-Life.
- Škofic, Domen (2010-05-06). "Martin Krpan 9a". YouTube.
- Schubert, Jakob (2010-04-01). "Underground (8c+/9a)". YouTube.
- Jaca (2010-01-02). "Martin Krpan 9a". YouTube. Climb.pl.
- VL (2009-03-03). "9a by Lukasz Dudek". Vertical-Life.
- EuroClimbing (2007-01-30). "Adam Ondra climbs Martin Krpan 9a". EuroClimbing.com.
- Jakob (n.d.). "Martin Krpan 9a". TheCrag.
