= Two Truths and a Lie (Yellowjackets) =

- Yellowjackets episode
- Episode no.: Season 2 Episode 5
- Directed by: Ben Semanoff
- Written by: Katherine Kearns; Sarah L. Thompson
- Cinematography by: Francois Dagenais
- Editing by: Kevin D. Ross
- Original air date: April 23, 2023
- Running time: 59 minutes

Guest appearances
- Nicole Maines as Lisa; Nia Sondaya as Akilah; Alex Wyndham as Kevyn Tan; John Reynolds as Matt Saracusa; Sarah Desjardins as Callie Sadecki; Alexa Barajas as Mari; Nuha Jes Izman as Crystal; Andres Soto as Adult Travis Martinez; Elijah Wood as Walter Tattersall

Episode chronology
← Previous "Old Wounds"	Next → "Qui"

"Two Truths and a Lie" is the fifth episode of the second season of the American thriller drama television series Yellowjackets. It is the fifteenth overall episode of the series and was written by co-producer Katherine Kearns and executive producer Sarah L. Thompson, and directed by Ben Semanoff. It aired on Showtime on April 23, 2023, but it was available to stream two days earlier on Paramount+ with Showtime.

The series follows a New Jersey high school girls' soccer team that travels to Seattle for a national tournament in 1996. While flying over Canada, their plane crashes deep in the wilderness, and the surviving team members are left stranded for nineteen months. The series chronicles their attempts to stay alive as some of the team members are driven to cannibalism. It also focuses on the lives of the survivors 25 years later in 2021, as the events of their ordeal continue to affect them many years after their rescue. In the episode, Callie realizes that Jay is actually a police officer, while Taissa asks Van for help. Flashbacks depict the team trying to use a meditation by Lottie as a snowstorm approaches.

According to Nielsen Media Research, the episode was seen by an estimated 0.163 million household viewers and gained a 0.02 ratings share among adults aged 18–49. The episode received highly positive reviews from critics, with particular praise for the flashback scenes.

== Plot ==
=== Flashbacks ===
Lottie (Courtney Eaton) begins hosting daily meditation sessions for the team. Shauna (Sophie Nélisse) is unsure of Lottie's intentions, and she catches her talking to her womb while she is sleeping. Javi is still not speaking to anyone, but Travis (Kevin Alves) defends his decision and scolds Natalie (Sophie Thatcher) for planting Javi's clothes in the woods.

Misty (Sammi Hanratty) and Crystal (Nuha Jes Izman) continue to bond, and they begin sharing secrets. While doing chores, Misty confides that she destroyed the plane's emergency transmitter shortly after the crash, which stuns and horrifies Crystal. Misty threatens to kill her if she tells anyone, but she accidentally backs her off the edge of a cliff, and Crystal falls to her death.

As a snowstorm approaches, an upset Shauna leaves the cabin, feeling she cannot trust Taissa (Jasmin Savoy Brown) for supporting Lottie over her. Taissa catches up to her to make amends, but Shauna starts having contractions. Using Lottie's meditation, Taissa comforts her and guides her back to the cabin, vowing to help her deliver the baby.

=== Present day ===
As she meets Van (Lauren Ambrose) at her store, Taissa (Tawny Cypress) reveals her sleepwalking has returned, and Van allows her to stay. In the middle of the night, Van encounters the fugue version of Taissa, who declares, "This isn't where we're supposed to be."

Callie (Sarah Desjardins) goes on a date with Jay (John Reynolds), but is frustrated that he is not returning her affections. While he leaves to go to the bathroom, Callie discovers a different name on his credit card bill. She quickly looks up the name on the Internet and learns that he is a police officer. When they leave, Callie lies by claiming that Shauna (Melanie Lynskey) was having an affair with Randy, not Adam. In an attempt to get Matt and Kevyn (Alex Wyndham) off their trail, Shauna meets with Randy at a motel to stage a false tryst, forcing him to masturbate in a condom and leaving it in the trash. After they leave, Kevyn and Matt enter the motel room. Matt discovers Randy used lotion instead, making them realize that Callie lied to Matt, but that Callie now knows Matt's real identity.

Misty (Christina Ricci) and Walter (Elijah Wood) eventually reach the commune, finding Natalie (Juliette Lewis). However, she dismisses her concerns and states that she is willingly staying with Lottie (Simone Kessell). Misty refuses to let Lottie influence her friends, despite Walter asking her to move on. When Walter suggests that Misty might have killed Adam, she cuts ties with him. Misty stays behind at the commune and asks to join.

Natalie begins to doubt Lottie's intentions after finding documents of everyone in the commune and indications that Lottie is scamming them, but is dismayed to learn that everyone is content with it. Later, Lottie helps Natalie in recalling her last moments with Travis and to learn what "she was right" about in his note. While with Travis, she suffered a drug overdose and, near the brink of death, had a different vision of the plane crash where everyone died and an unknown entity wearing antlers entered the plane. When she wakes up, Natalie tells Travis (and Lottie in the present) that "we brought it back", referring to a darkness that is with them or inside of them, and still is.

== Development ==
=== Production ===
The episode was written by co-producer Katherine Kearns and executive producer Sarah L. Thompson, and directed by Ben Semanoff. This marked Kearns' second writing credit, Thompson's fourth writing credit, and Semanoff's second directing credit.

=== Writing ===
For the scene where Misty accidentally gets Crystal to fall off a cliff, Sammi Hanratty said, "I have to care about Misty to play her, so I have a lot of love for her. And my heart kind of broke for her when Crystal does turn on her. Every time we did that scene, I don't even consider myself a Method actor, but my heart literally would drop every time she rejected me, and I felt like I was turning into a little kid again. Scrambling to take back what I just did."

== Reception ==
=== Viewers ===
The episode was watched by 0.163 million viewers, earning a 0.02 in the 18-49 rating demographics on the Nielsen ratings scale. This means that 0.02 percent of all households with televisions watched the episode. This was a 28% decrease from the previous episode, which was watched by 0.226 million viewers with a 0.03 in the 18-49 demographics.

=== Critical reviews ===
"Two Truths and a Lie" received highly positive reviews from critics. The review aggregator website Rotten Tomatoes reported a 90% approval rating for the episode, with an average rating of 7.8/10 and based on 10 reviews.

Hattie Lindert of The A.V. Club gave the episode an "A–" and wrote, "As Yellowjackets' second season tiptoes towards its midpoint, the individual relationships between the teenaged girls have become a clear fulcrum for their adult counterparts' interactions: Shauna's inability to face reality, the only thing that allows her to brunch with Jackie's parents; Tai's fear of opening up to absolutely anyone but Van; Natalie's well of frustration and jealousy towards Lottie that sometimes, when she lets her guard down, borders on awe."

Erin Qualey of Vulture gave the episode a 4 star rating out of 5 and wrote, "This moment provides loose proof for a Yellowjackets theory that's been floating in the ether for some time now. “This isn't where we're supposed to be” feels eerily like the chilling “We have to go back!” declaration that Jack made at the end of season 3 of Lost. Yellowjackets shares a fair share of DNA with Lost, and it feels like it would make sense for the adult survivors to return to the scene of the crime. Do they have to go back to the wilderness in order to heal from their trauma? Or is there something calling them that needs to be dealt with?" Proma Khosla of IndieWire gave the episode a "B–" and wrote, "Luckily for Misty, her lie about losing Crystal during the storm is quickly eclipsed by Shauna and Tai's return to the cabin, with Shauna actively in labor. New life is on the way, as Lottie told us that very morning, “and we can't wait to meet him.”"

Bernard Boo of Den of Geek gave the episode a 4 star rating out of 5 and wrote, "All of the stories are pushed along in interesting ways, and while nothing particularly nuclear happens, we've arrived at a point where these characters are simply entertaining to be with, which is the sweet spot for any show." Erik Kain of Forbes wrote, "I'm having a bit of a tricky time with Yellowjackets lately. Maybe because the bar was set so high in Season 1, I come to this second season with an unreasonably high standard. Maybe I'm just tired of being burned. Whatever the case, something just isn't quite clicking for me this season. There have been some extremely great moments, but ever since the introduction of the new teenage girls, it feels like the show is slipping."

Coleman Spilde of The Daily Beast wrote, "Now that we're halfway through the season, Yellowjackets has finally managed to fill its episodes with consistent surprises again. Let's hope this momentum keeps up long after the spring thaw." Cade Taylor of Telltale TV gave the episode a 3.5 star rating out of 5 and wrote, "With very few more obscene, standout moments, this episode deals with many different moving facets that alter and push the storyline forward drastically to build up to what is inevitably going to be one of the most significant episodes of the season with episode six."

Esther Zuckerman of The New York Times wrote, "In an earlier scene, Lottie had told the fetus, “You are going to change everything.” Now the child is here, a new life entering the world replacing Crystal, who has left it. Bye, bestie. Hello, baby." Brittney Bender of Bleeding Cool gave the episode a perfect 10 out of 10 rating and wrote, "Showtime's Yellowjackets S02E05, "Two Truths and a Lie," heightens the season and warns viewers of the storms that remain ahead both in the wilderness and out of it. There's plenty of fantastic balance between dark comedy and rising tension to make this episode incredibly entertaining and shocking."
