= Burial (Yellowjackets) =

- Yellowjackets episode
- Episode no.: Season 2 Episode 7
- Directed by: Anya Adams
- Written by: Rich Monahan; Liz Phang
- Cinematography by: Shasta Spahn
- Editing by: Daniel Williams
- Original air date: May 14, 2023
- Running time: 59 minutes

Guest appearances
- Nicole Maines as Lisa; Nia Sondaya as Akilah; John Cameron Mitchell as Caligula; François Arnaud as Paul; Alexa Barajas as Mari; Elijah Wood as Walter Tattersall

Episode chronology
← Previous "Qui"	Next → "It Chooses"

"Burial" is the seventh episode of the second season of the American thriller drama television series Yellowjackets. It is the seventeenth overall episode of the series and was written by Rich Monahan and co-executive producer Liz Phang, and directed by Anya Adams. It aired on Showtime on May 14, 2023, but it was available to stream two days earlier on Paramount+ with Showtime.

The series follows a New Jersey high school girls' soccer team that travels to Seattle for a national tournament in 1996. While flying over Canada, their plane crashes deep in the wilderness, and the surviving team members are left stranded for nineteen months. The series chronicles their attempts to stay alive as some of the team members are driven to cannibalism. It also focuses on the lives of the survivors 25 years later in 2021, as the events of their ordeal continue to affect them many years after their rescue. In the episode, Shauna, Taissa, Misty and Van undergo different treatments at Lottie's compound. Flashbacks depict Shauna's grief following her baby's death, and the group's search for Crystal.

According to Nielsen Media Research, the episode was seen by an estimated 0.165 million household viewers and gained a 0.03 ratings share among adults aged 18–49. The episode received critical acclaim, who praised the performances, character development and flashback sequences. Melanie Lynskey received a nomination for Outstanding Lead Actress in a Drama Series at the 75th Primetime Emmy Awards.

== Plot ==
=== Flashbacks ===
As the snowstorm dissipates, Shauna (Sophie Nélisse) still grieves over her baby. During this, some team members begin to question whatever happened to Crystal, and consider if Misty (Sammi Hanratty) was involved in her disappearance. Overhearing this, Misty assembles some of the girls to help her find Crystal.

Misty reaches the location where Crystal fell, but is shocked to find that the body is missing. She spots Ben (Steven Krueger) on the edge of the cliff, intending to commit suicide after his hallucinations worsen. Misty threatens Ben by claiming that he was the baby's father and by exposing his homosexuality, but Ben does not care. As a last resort, she pleads for him to stay, as she cannot deal with another death after failing to save Shauna's baby. Shauna returns to the cabin, confronting Misty for not saving her baby. Shauna punches her, and the girls struggle to calm her. Lottie (Courtney Eaton) states she understands her pain and tells her to let it all out on her, and Shauna brutally attacks her. As the girls tend Lottie, a shaken Shauna leaves the cabin.

=== Present day ===
At the compound, Lottie (Simone Kessell) asks the girls in trying different forms of treatment. During this, she once again consults her psychiatrist on her visions, now certain that "it" made them come together again. She is suddenly confronted by the presence of the Queen, questioning her. Lottie is interrupted by Lisa (Nicole Maines), revealing that her whole conversation with the psychiatrist was a hallucination, as the latter never existed.

Shauna (Melanie Lynskey) takes Self Care and is asked to take care of a baby goat for the day. She grows annoyed with the task, but believes the compound will eventually kill the goat when she gives it away. Taissa takes Renewal, and is frustrated that her treatment involves painting a barn. Van takes Forage, and subsequently joins Taissa to share a drink. They end up kissing, but Taissa feels bad about it. Van reveals that she has cancer, and only has a few months left to live. She will not seek any more treatment, and was not going to tell Taissa about it until she arrived at her store.

Misty takes Guidance, in which she enters an isolation tank. She imagines a scenario where Walter (Elijah Wood) and a human version of her bird Caligula (John Cameron Mitchell) perform a musical number. The latter convinces Misty that she is still a good person, regardless of what she did to Adam. Afterwards, she calls Walter, apologizing and asking to meet again. When the girls meet with Natalie (Juliette Lewis), she gets them to join to drink, forcing Lottie to accept. As they catch up over the previous events, they begin to wonder if they have repressed their memories from the wilderness. When one of their favorite songs starts playing, they dance. They are interrupted by a follower who informs Shauna that Jeff (Warren Kole) is calling her. When she answers, he reveals that the police have found Adam's body.

== Development ==
=== Production ===
The episode was written by Rich Monahan and co-executive producer Liz Phang, and directed by Anya Adams. This marked Monahan's first writing credit, Phang's fourth writing credit, and Adams' first directing credit.

== Reception ==
=== Viewers ===
The episode was watched by 0.165 million viewers, earning a 0.03 in the 18-49 rating demographics on the Nielsen ratings scale. This means that 0.03 percent of all households with televisions watched the episode. This was a slight increase from the previous episode, which was watched by 0.158 million viewers with a 0.04 in the 18-49 demographics.

=== Critical reviews ===
"Burial" received positive reviews from critics. The review aggregator website Rotten Tomatoes reported an 88% approval rating for the episode, with an average rating of 7.8/10 and based on 8 reviews.

Hattie Lindert of The A.V. Club gave the episode an "A–" and wrote, "As Lottie herself pointed out, they got what they wanted: Shauna lived. Self-care culture rooted in loving thy neighbor is so played out, anyway (although frankly, this group of women wouldn't seem all that out of place on a Goop cruise). “Spill blood” and you might get lucky, but sacrifice a life and you could end up blessed."

Erin Qualey of Vulture gave the episode a 4 star rating out of 5 and wrote, "unable and unwilling to face the gruesome realities of their shared past, these women seem doomed to go down the same paths of destruction that they once walked as teens in the wilderness. As Lottie tells Antler Shrink: “We hurt each other.” As the episode draws to a close, it certainly feels like someone will soon be on the chopping block in the present." Proma Khosla of IndieWire gave the episode an "A–" and wrote, "There is more to this scene than visceral violence; the girls have finally abandoned all civility, its foundation weakened by the regular atrocities they withstand in the wilderness. At the same time, new laws — minacious laws — take root in their place. Shauna's ferocity is not viewed as barbaric, but fair, and critical to her survival and the group's at large."

Bernard Boo of Den of Geek gave the episode a 4.5 star rating out of 5 and wrote, "“Burial” is yet another brilliant entry in what has been a stellar season so far, and hopefully this high-caliber storytelling will continue through the remaining episodes." Erik Kain of Forbes wrote, "I'm pleased to report that for a second week in a row, Yellowjackets is back to being excellent, powerful and profound — not to mention terrifying, beautiful, sad, funny. The whole shebang."

Coleman Spilde of The Daily Beast wrote, "If there is a God, this season of Yellowjackets will follow this respectable ending and close out with a narratively steady final two episodes. But my hopes have been almost entirely dashed at this point. I'm bracing for impact, instead of welcoming what's next. I never thought we'd be at this point, and I'm sincerely sad that we are." Cade Taylor of Telltale TV gave the episode a perfect 5 star rating out of 5 and wrote, "Yellowjackets feels like one of the only series on television right now that isn't missing a single beat. Each week the stakes get more drastic, and we get one step closer to experiencing the real, untold horrors of what happened in the wilderness, all while getting extra, fun mini-storylines that impact the bigger picture."

Esther Zuckerman of The New York Times wrote, "Yellowjackets contains multitudes, and they are all present in the seventh episode of this second season, “Burial.” Did you think this was going to be an entirely somber hour of television dealing with the aftermath of the death of Shauna's child in the woods? You were mistaken. Yes, there's some of that. And it's all very sad." Brittney Bender of Bleeding Cool gave the episode a 9 out of 10 rating and wrote, "Showtime's Yellowjackets S02E07 "Burial" was a wild ride full of moments that brought emotional panic and turned the corner towards the absurdity and brutality of survival and trauma. While some concerns remain involving the future of queer characters being depicted, the heartfelt humanity in the midst of supernatural sparks keeps this series producing fantastic episodes, one after the other."

=== Accolades ===
TVLine named Christina Ricci as an honorable mention for the "Performer of the Week" for the week of May 20, 2023, for her performance in the episode. The site wrote, "We're still not sure how we felt about Misty's Twin Peaks-esque sensory-deprivation-tank dream in last week's Yellowjackets but we're 100 percent sure that we loved the performance Christina Ricci gave when Misty called Walter immediately afterward. The scene was very brief and totally one-sided, but Ricci filled it completely. As Misty left her fellow citizen detective a peppy voicemail, the character's joy from her recent epiphany was infectious. Ricci delivered her lines at 100 mph, zesting them with the excitement of new attraction, the glee of discovery and the dorky accoutrements that always make her character such a freaky joy to behold."

Melanie Lynskey submitted the episode to support her nomination for Outstanding Lead Actress in a Drama Series at the 75th Primetime Emmy Awards. She would lose to Sarah Snook for Succession.
