= Mišja Peč =

Coordinates: 45°34′3.23″N 13°51′48.99″E

Climbing at Mišja Peč

Mišja Peč (pronounced [ˈmiːʃja ˈpeːtʃ], Slovene: Mišja peč) is a climbing area located on the Karst Rim in Slovenia.

Together with the faces of Osp, the rocky amphitheatre of Mišja Peč forms an almost continuous single climbing area. In recent years this overhang semicircular wall has represented an important challenge to the numerous top climbers who come from all over the world. Recently, quite a few easier routes have been opened in the extreme left part of the crag and to the right of the amphitheatre, which might also attract those climbing in lower grades. The overhangs and stalactites of various forms and sizes offer difficulties from 6b up.

Since 1987, the upper end of the grades have been climbed, earning this crag its reputation as the foremost sports climbing area in Slovenia, and among the better climbing areas in Europe.

Notable routes:

- Martin Krpan
