= Umberto Girometta =

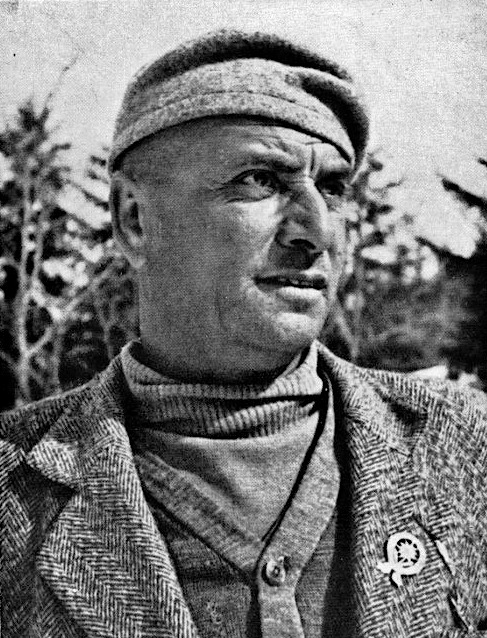

Umberto Girometta (16 July 1883 – 27 April 1939) was a Croatian educator, naturalist, mountaineer, and speleologist. He founded several organizations including the natural history museum in Split for which he collected numerous specimens.

Girometta was born in an Italian family in Split where he was educated. He then went to Vienna where he studied natural history until 1908. He then became a teacher at the Real Gymnasium (Realna gimnazija) in Split. He taught physics, geography and natural history while also writing popular articles and books. In 1924, he was a co-founder of the Museum of Natural History in Split along with others like Marki Rudi. He was also involved in studying the karst caves of the region. A species of spider that was discovered in Vranjača Cave was named after him as Stalita giromettai.

Girometta died on Marjan after leaving a farewell letter to his family.
