= Claret, Hérault =

Claret
- Commune
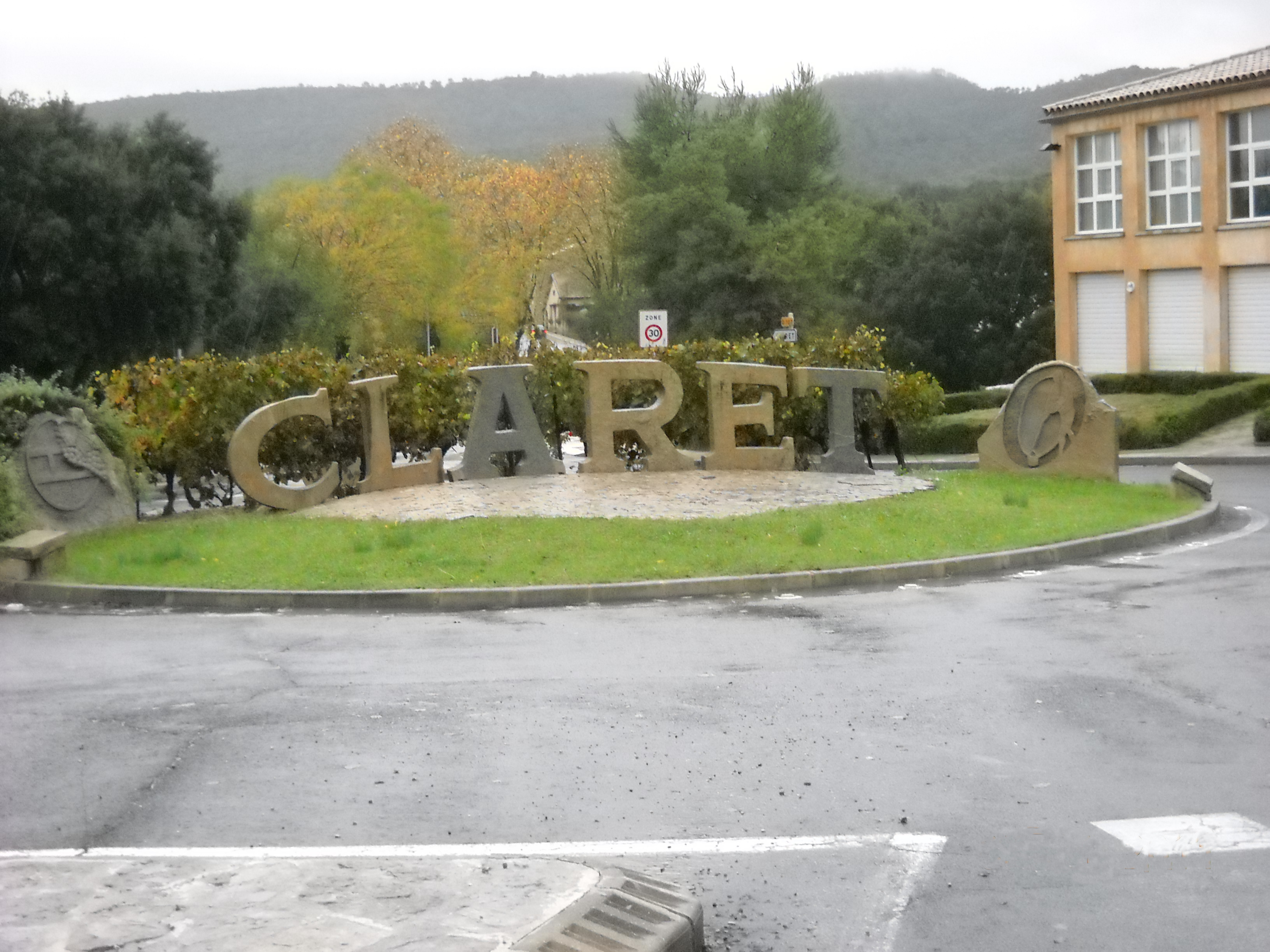
- Sculpture made by a local craftsman in local quarry stone at the entrance of the village, before the bridge over the Brestalou. In the background is the Crête de Taillade.

- Coat of arms
- Location of Claret
- Location within France Location within Occitanie
- Coordinates: 43°51′46″N 3°54′20″E
- Country: France
- Region: Occitania
- Department: Hérault
- Arrondissement: Lodève
- Canton: Lodève

Government
  - Mayor (2020–2026): Philippe Tourrier
- Area^{1}: 28.27 km^{2} (10.92 sq mi)
- Elevation: 115 m (377 ft)
- Highest elevation: 410 m (1,350 ft)
- Lowest elevation: 135 m (443 ft)
- Population (2023): 1,745
  - Density: 61.73/km^{2} (159.9/sq mi)
- Time zone: UTC+01:00 (CET)
  - Summer (DST): UTC+02:00 (CEST)
- INSEE/Postal code: 34078 /34270
- ^{1} French Land Register data, which excludes lakes, ponds, glaciers > 1 km^{2} (0.386 sq mi or 247 acres) and river estuaries.

Claret (French pronunciation: [klaʁɛ]) is a commune in the Hérault department in southern France.

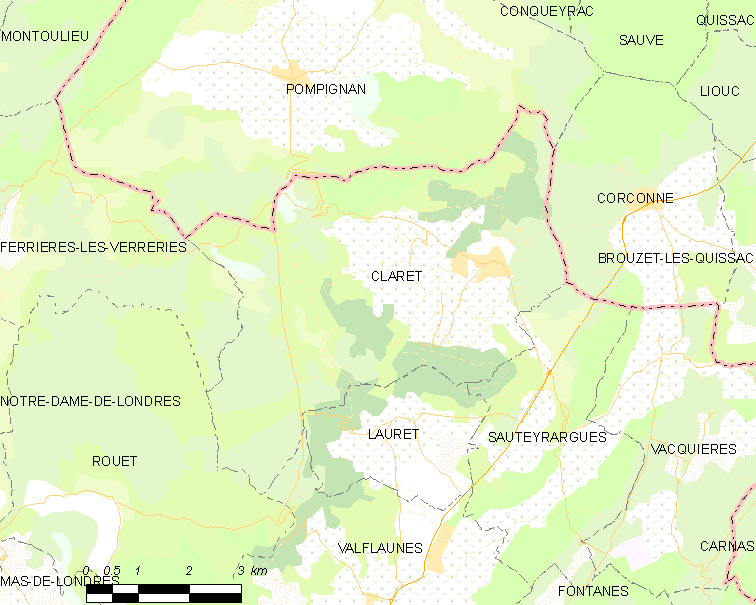
Geographic map of Claret within Hérault

== Population ==
Historical population
Year	Pop.	±% p.a.
1968	468	—
1975	476	+0.24%
1982	526	+1.44%
1990	825	+5.79%
1999	1,069	+2.92%
2007	1,339	+2.85%
2012	1,414	+1.10%
2017	1,563	+2.02%
2023	1,745	+1.85%
Source: INSEE

== See also ==
- Communes of the Hérault department
