= Qui (Yellowjackets) =

- Yellowjackets episode
- Episode no.: Season 2 Episode 6
- Directed by: Liz Garbus
- Written by: Karen Joseph Adcock; Ameni Rozsa
- Cinematography by: Shasta Spahn
- Editing by: Jeff Israel
- Original air date: May 7, 2023
- Running time: 55 minutes

Guest appearances
- Nicole Maines as Lisa; Nia Sondaya as Akilah; Alex Wyndham as Kevyn Tan; John Reynolds as Matt Saracusa; François Arnaud as Paul; Sarah Desjardins as Callie Sadecki; Nuha Jes Izman as Crystal; Alexa Barajas as Mari

Episode chronology
← Previous "Two Truths and a Lie"	Next → "Burial"

"Qui" is the sixth episode of the second season of the American thriller drama television series Yellowjackets. It is the sixteenth overall episode of the series and was written by Karen Joseph Adcock and executive producer Ameni Rozsa, and directed by Liz Garbus. It aired on Showtime on May 7, 2023, but it was available to stream two days earlier on Paramount+ with Showtime.

The series follows a New Jersey high school girls' soccer team that travels to Seattle for a national tournament in 1996. While flying over Canada, their plane crashes deep in the wilderness, and the surviving team members are left stranded for nineteen months. The series chronicles their attempts to stay alive as some of the team members are driven to cannibalism. It also focuses on the lives of the survivors 25 years later in 2021, as the events of their ordeal continue to affect them many years after their rescue. In the episode, Misty contacts Taissa to help her in Lottie's commune, while Shauna and Callie are called for a police interrogation. Flashbacks depict the group's efforts in delivering Shauna's baby.

According to Nielsen Media Research, the episode was seen by an estimated 0.158 million household viewers and gained a 0.04 ratings share among adults aged 18–49. The episode received critical acclaim, who praised the flashback sequences, present-day storylines and performances.

== Plot ==
=== Flashbacks ===
Shauna (Sophie Nélisse) starts going into labor, and despite her reservations, the team gets Misty (Sammi Hanratty) to help deliver her baby. However, Misty is still affected by her role in Crystal's death, and struggles to perform her duties. Natalie (Sophie Thatcher) asks Ben (Steven Krueger) to help as he showed them a childbirth video, but he still has no idea how to do it. The team decides that they need to make an offering, and Travis (Kevin Alves) cuts his hand.

Per Lottie's request, Misty returns to deliver the baby. The team sings a chant, and Misty successfully delivers Shauna's baby. Shauna tries to calm her baby, but his cries continue growing louder. Lottie claims she does not have milk to feed him, but Shauna is confused when she believes they want to eat her baby. Shauna sits with the baby, comforting him and finally breastfeeding. After sleeping, she is horrified to learn that the team has eaten her baby. This is revealed to be another dream, but Shauna is given bad news; her baby did not survive and she simply dreamed everything after the delivery. Shauna breaks down sobbing, insisting that she can still hear her baby crying.

=== Present day ===
Misty (Christina Ricci) meets with Lottie (Simone Kessell), intending to get Natalie (Juliette Lewis) out. Despite refusing, Lottie asks her to stay for her sake. Lottie once again visits her psychiatrist, as her visions keep worsening. She begins to question if "it" followed from the wilderness. Natalie is visited by Lisa (Nicole Maines), who wants her to take care of her fish, hoping this can mend their past interactions. Lisa explains that she believes in the concept of forgiveness, as suffering will only ruin their lives.

Van (Lauren Ambrose) tells Taissa (Tawny Cypress) that her sleepwalking self told her that they were not supposed to be there. Unwilling to get involved, Van asks her to go. As she leaves, Taissa notices Van's past due notices in the trashcan, but Van brushes it off. Taissa is called by Misty, who asks her to come to the commune. When Van learns about it, she decides to accompany Taissa.

The police asks Callie (Sarah Desjardins) to come over for an interrogation, and Shauna (Melanie Lynskey) accompanies her. Shauna confronts Matt (John Reynolds) for using Callie, revealing her affair with Adam, while Callie lies to Kevyn (Alex Wyndham) by claiming that Matt took her virginity. During this, Jeff (Warren Kole) receives a call from Taissa, who explains she is going to Lottie's commune. When they leave the station, Jeff tells Shauna to go to the commune, believing her presence is affecting Callie. As Taissa and Van reach the commune, they notice Shauna coming along. Upon entering, they reunite with Misty and Natalie, and face Lottie together.

== Development ==
=== Production ===
The episode was written by Karen Joseph Adcock and executive producer Ameni Rozsa, and directed by Liz Garbus. This marked Adcock's first writing credit, Rozsa's fourth writing credit, and Garbus' first directing credit.

=== Filming ===
On the episode's ending, director Liz Garbus said, "The idea was to make Shauna feel grounded and like the audience is with her. You didn't have any knowledge ahead of her, you're right alongside her going through this." Garbus used Rosemary's Baby as inspiration, which she showed to the cast. She added, "in some ways, the reality of episode six is so dark that I bet it felt different to them than to eating Jackie, which was certainly part of their grounded, pragmatic timeline."

Much of Shauna's birth scene had to be reshot due to a technical malfunction, where a significant portion of the footage was lost. Jasmin Savoy Brown called it "the worst day of a lot of our lives, no exaggeration, because it took four days to shoot that scene."

== Reception ==
=== Viewers ===
The episode was watched by 0.158 million viewers, earning a 0.04 in the 18-49 rating demographics on the Nielsen ratings scale. This means that 0.04 percent of all households with televisions watched the episode. This was a slight decrease from the previous episode, which was watched by 0.163 million viewers with a 0.02 in the 18-49 demographics.

=== Critical reviews ===
"Qui" received critical acclaim. The review aggregator website Rotten Tomatoes reported a 100% approval rating for the episode, with an average rating of 9.2/10 and based on 10 reviews.

Hattie Lindert of The A.V. Club gave the episode an "A" and wrote, "Yellowjackets has always built its plot-lines around the convergence between what's real and what's not, but that line has rarely looked as devastating as Shauna being ripped from her delusion, the only thing that was really, truly hers. All of a sudden, the trauma of the wilderness takes a different tone. Memories of what did happen may be cruel, but the memories of what could have been are vicious."

Erin Qualey of Vulture gave the episode a perfect 5 star rating out of 5 and wrote, "In a year full of brutal television, Yellowjackets delivers one of the most heartrending episodes to date. It is titled 'Qui,' but it might as well be called 'A Tale of Two Shaunas.'" Proma Khosla of IndieWire gave the episode a "B+" and wrote, ""Haunting" is not a sufficient adjective for the episode's final moments, when Shauna wakes up in actuality and learns that she lost the baby. It's not only believable, but realistic — delivered by people without experience, likely premature, and from a starving mother, the baby was always in some danger — and still incredibly painful. After enduring one incomprehensible horror after another, she has no choice but to move forward, even as we leave her in these last moments with her son."

Bernard Boo of Den of Geek gave the episode a 4 star rating out of 5 and wrote, "'Qui' marks a thrilling ramp-up in momentum for Yellowjackets' present-day and '90s storylines. The characters' individual narrative threads continue to be woven together in unexpected ways, and it's fascinating to watch the survivors' dark tapestry of trauma and regret begin to take shape." Erik Kain of Forbes wrote, "The final scene, when Shauna actually wakes up to living reality only to discover that her baby has been stillborn, is heartbreaking. Sophie Nélisse does such a phenomenal job here, it's hard to not get a little teary watching."

Coleman Spilde of The Daily Beast wrote, "This ending is a fantastic, truly gutting way for Yellowjackets to affirm what it has been trying to tell us since Episode 1: that the girls' experience with real life is just as horrific as their encounters with anything supernatural. With a week off in between episodes, the scene hits even harder, elevating Season 2 with its strongest entry yet." Cade Taylor of Telltale TV gave the episode a perfect 5 star rating out of 5 and wrote, "'Qui' is one of the most gripping, keep-you-on-the-edge-of-your-seat episodes of the season with Shauna's labor and the anticipation for what's to come of wilderness baby. And it's only the beginning of how treacherous the series is about to make these kids' lives."

Esther Zuckerman of The New York Times wrote, "During her meeting with her psychiatrist, Lottie explains that she isn't worried that she is ill, she is worried that she never was ill, that all of the terrors she experienced were very much real and now they are re-emerging. The past has now arrived on her land in the form of these five women. Even if they are seeking peace, it’s hard to imagine that's what they are bringing with them." Brittney Bender of Bleeding Cool gave the episode a perfect 10 out of 10 rating and wrote, "Showtime's Yellowjackets, S02E06, "Qui" was a beautiful and gut-wrenching display of grief, trauma, and the brutality that can develop in the mind through false hopes."
