= Holštejn =

- Municipality
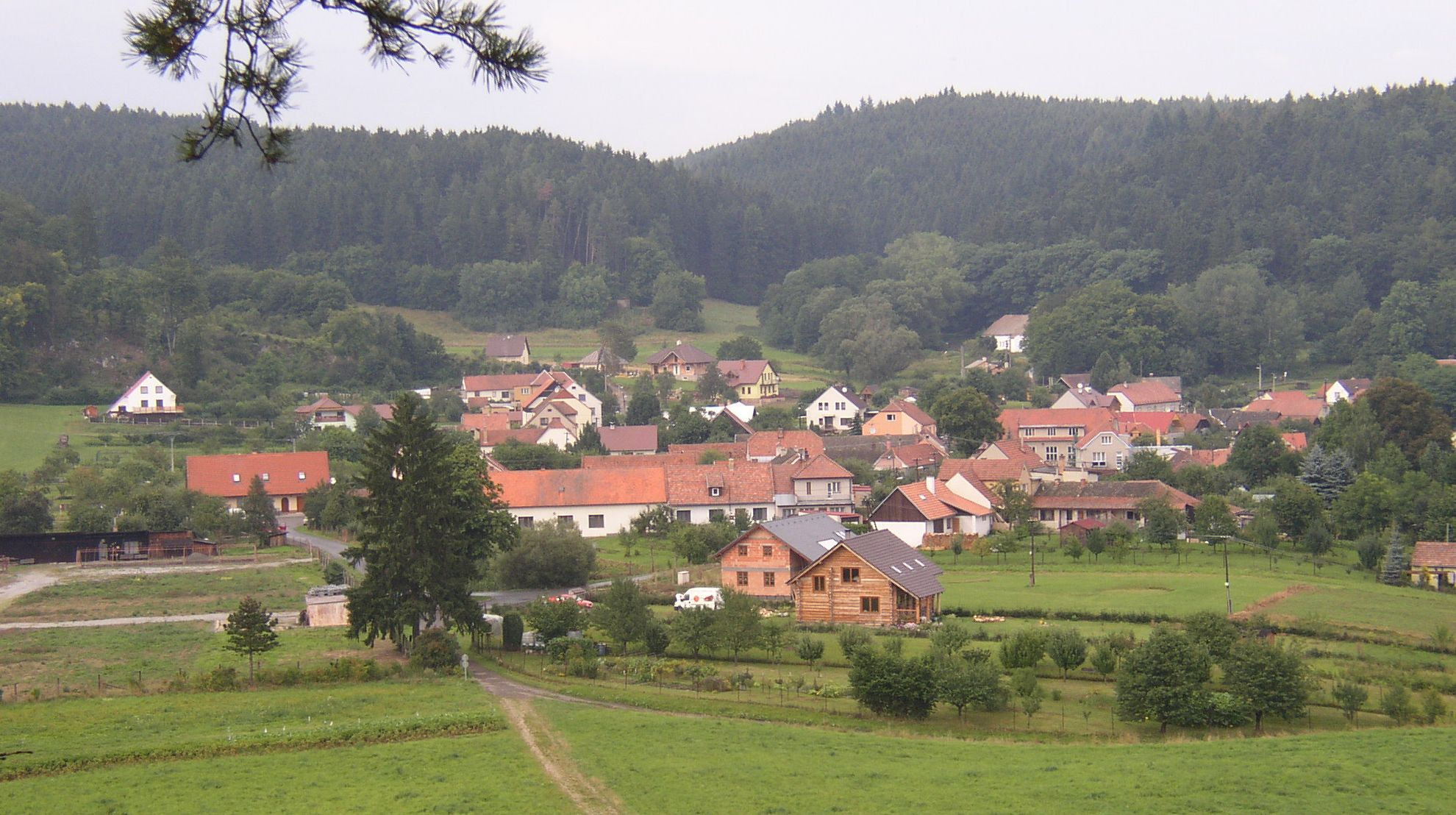
- General view

- Flag Coat of arms

- Location in the Czech Republic
- Coordinates: 49°24′23″N 16°46′40″E
- Country: Czech Republic
- Region: South Moravian
- District: Blansko
- First mentioned: 1349

Area
  - Total: 6.47 km^{2} (2.50 sq mi)
- Elevation: 462 m (1,516 ft)

Population (2026-01-01)
  - Total: 163
  - Density: 25.2/km^{2} (65.3/sq mi)
- Time zone: UTC+1 (CET)
  - Summer (DST): UTC+2 (CEST)
- Postal code: 679 13
- Website: www.holstejn.eu

Holštejn is a municipality and village in Blansko District in the South Moravian Region of the Czech Republic. It has about 200 inhabitants.

== Geography ==
Holštejn is located about 10 kilometres (6 mi) northeast of Blansko and 24 km (15 mi) northeast of Brno. It lies in the Drahany Highlands. The highest point is at 600 m (2,000 ft) above sea level. The stream Bílá voda flows through the municipality. The southwestern part of the municipality lies within the Moravian Karst Protected Landscape Area.

== History ==
The first written mention of Holštejn is from 1349, when Vok I of Holštejn was mentioned. It was a castle and a market town. In 1550, Holštejn was described as abandoned and only one mill survived. In 1791, the village of Holštejn was established again.

== Demographics ==
Historical population

Year	Pop.	±%
1869	239	—
1880	238	−0.4%
1890	253	+6.3%
1900	248	−2.0%
1910	260	+4.8%

Year	Pop.	±%
1921	240	−7.7%
1930	211	−12.1%
1950	220	+4.3%
1961	223	+1.4%
1970	226	+1.3%

Year	Pop.	±%
1980	209	−7.5%
1991	161	−23.0%
2001	147	−8.7%
2011	153	+4.1%
2021	153	+0.0%

Source: Censuses

== Transport ==
There are no railways or major roads passing through the municipality.

== Sights ==
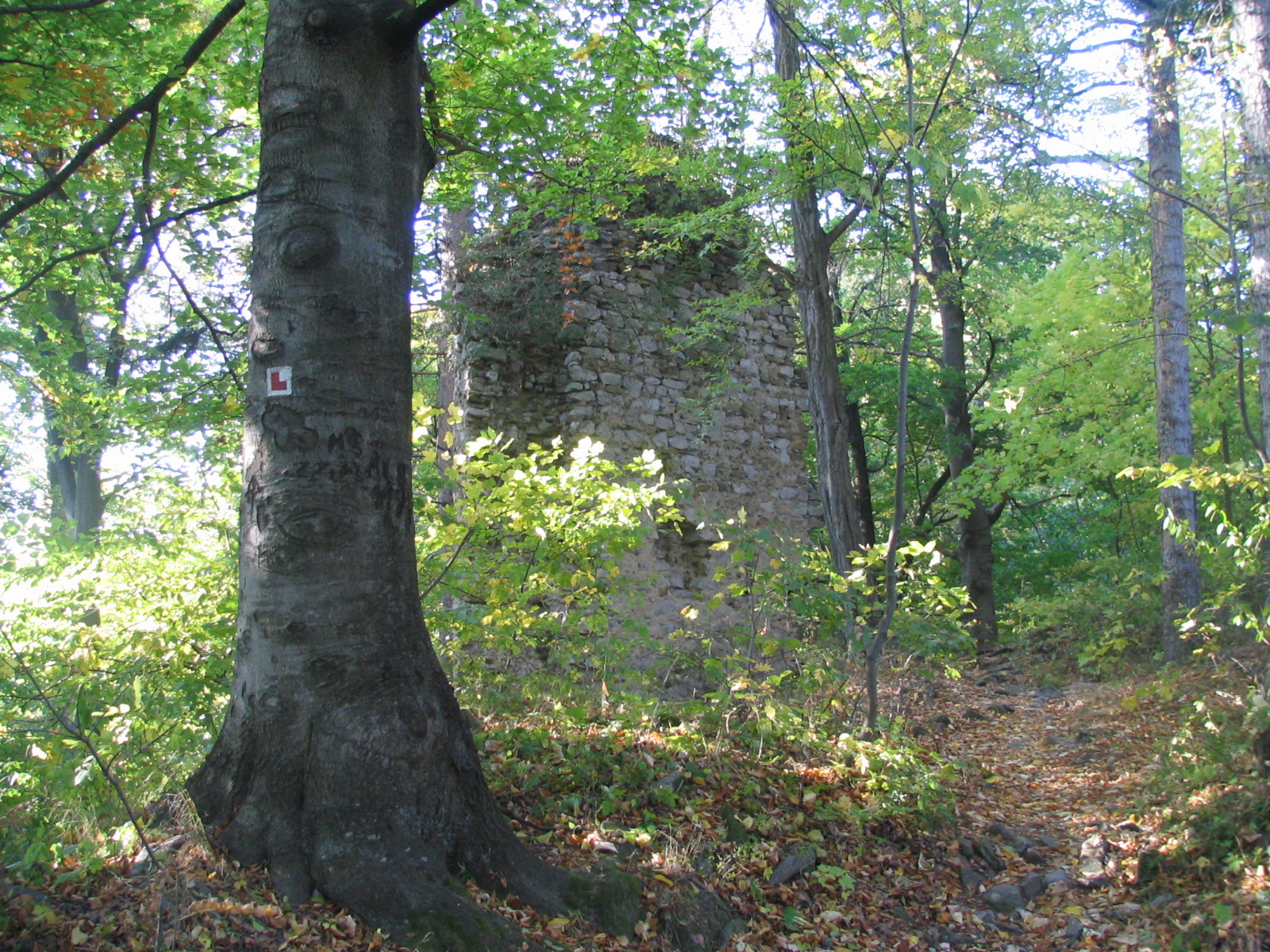
Fragment of the Holštejn Castle

The main cultural landmark of Holštejn is the ruin of the Holštejn Castle. The castle was built in the early Gothic style, in 1278 at the latest. During the 15th century, it became uninhabited and in 1531, it was described as abandoned.

== Notable people ==
- Josef Korčák (1921–2008), politician
