= Qui (climb) =

Sport climbing route in Austria

Qui and Wagnis Orange
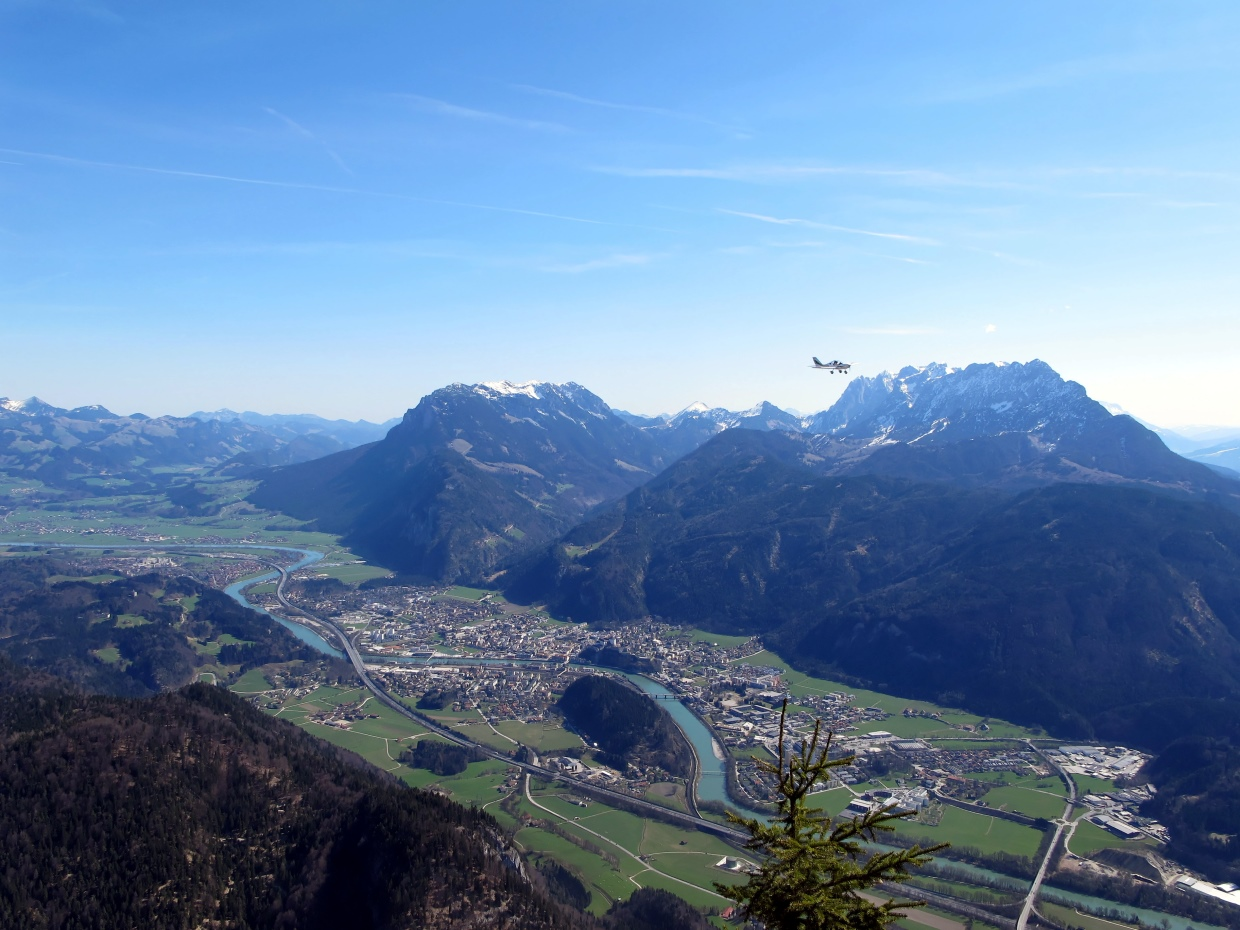
- Kufstein and the Kaisertal: The Geisterschmiedwand lies at the wooded base on the right.

- Location within Tyrol, Austria
- Location: Geisterschmiedwand, Kufstein, Kaisertal, Zahmer Kaiser, Tyrol, Austria
- Coordinates: 47°35′35.5″N 12°11′26.3″E
- Climbing area: Geisterschmiedwand
- Route type: Sport climbing; Face climbing
- Rock type: Limestone
- Vertical gain: Qui 32 metres (105 ft); Wagnis Orange 22 metres (72 ft)
- Pitches: 1
- Technical grade: Qui 9a+ (5.15a) (post-hold break); Qui 9a (5.14d) (pre-hold break); Wagnis Orange 8c (5.14b)
- Bolted by: Qui, unknown; Wagnis Orange, Gerhard Hörhager
- First free ascent: Qui, Stefan Fürst, 1996; Wagnis Orange, Gerhard Hörhager, 1988

Qui is a 32-metre (105 ft) sport climbing route at the Geisterschmiedwand, a limestone cliff face near Kufstein, in the Kaisertal Valley of the Zahmer Kaiser mountains of Tyrol, Austria. It is notable for its grade progression and a 23-year gap between its first ascent and its first repeat.

Austrian climber Stefan Fürst achieved the first free ascent of the route in 1996 and originally graded it 8c+ (5.14c), though it was later upgraded to 9a (5.14d) by consensus. The route shares its first 10 metres (33 ft) with the line Wagnis Orange, first redpointed in 1988 by Austrian Gerhard Hörhager. Initially graded 8b+ (5.14a), Wagnis Orange was later re-evaluated as the world's second or third 8c (5.14b) route.

In September 2019, Czech climber Adam Ondra made the first repeat of Qui. Due to a crucial foothold that had broken during his early attempts in 2008, he upgraded the route to 9a+ (5.15a), a difficulty that has since been confirmed by subsequent ascents.

== History ==
=== Wagnis Orange ===
Zillertal-based professional climber Gerhard Hörhager turned his focus to his home valley after gaining international sport climbing experience in Southern France and Australia. In the Zillertal, he established several of the region's first major sport climbing lines, including Sooner or Later 8a (5.13b) and Sagaro 8a+ (5.13c) at the climbing area Ewige Jagdgründe. Afterwards, he turned his attention to the Geisterschmiedwand near Kufstein and opened the line Manray 8b (5.13d).

Also at this venue in 1988, he redpointed the 22-metre (72 ft) route Wagnis Orange, (Note: According to the downloaded Topo of Wagnis Orange (No. 40):) originally grading it 8b+ (5.14a). At the time, this difficulty represented the cutting edge of international sport climbing. Hörhager's ascent was driven by his belief that local cliffs held the potential for routes of the same level (Note: Original German: ... wir ja auch das Potentzial für Schweres haben müssten. In der Geisterschmiedwand hab ich es dann gefunden ...) as the 8b+ (5.14a) benchmark established by Wolfgang Güllich's Wallstreet in the Franconian Jura in 1987.

According to climbing photographer Gerd Heidorn, Hörhager chose the name Wagnis Orange "after a book by the Indian guru Osho". (Note: Original German: ... sowie „Wagnis Orange" ... benannt nach einem Buch des indischen Gurus Osho, ...)

=== Qui ===
==== First ascent ====
In the mid-1990s, the tall 1.90 metres or 6 feet 3 inches nine-time Austrian national climbing champion Stefan Fürst turned his attention to a then-nameless 32-metre (105 ft) project at the Geisterschmiedwand. (Note: According to the downloaded Topo of Qui (No. 39):) The line utilised the start of Wagnis Orange at its base and had already been bolted but remained unclimbed. (Note: Original quote by Fürst in German: ... Qui war viele Jahre eingebohrt, zuvor schon ...) Fürst invested approximately 60 project days before securing the first free ascent in 1996. He proposed a grade of 8c+ (5.14c), using Güllich's Action Directe—then tentatively considered an 8c+ (5.14c) line—as a historical benchmark. As Fürst did not want to name the route himself, climbing photographer Heinz Zak chose the name Qui. (Note: Original quote by Fürst in German: ... der Name ist definitiv von Heinz Zak und nicht von mir.)

==== First repetition and upgrade ====
In September 2019, Czech climber Adam Ondra made the first repeat of Qui, ending a 23-year gap since its first ascent, with the route's pioneer Fürst serving as his belayer.

Between his first attempts in 2008 and his eventual success in 2019, Ondra spent a total of 10 days on the wall spread across various trips. The route's difficulty led him to include it in a 2012 article for PlanetMountain titled "The routes I cannot climb!", noting that the wall is "not friendly for trying hard routes because it's notoriously wet despite being exposed to the sun from 9am onwards, which means the only time to try it is early in the morning." Due to a crucial foothold that had broken during his initial attempts in 2008, Ondra—who described the crux of Qui as "very special and morphological"—proposed a grade of 9a+ (5.15a).

== Route ==
=== General overview ===
Qui is located in Sector 1 of the south-facing limestone cliff Geisterschmiedwand at an elevation of 550 metres (1,800 ft) above sea level. (Note: Topo for Sector 1, featuring Qui (No. 39) and Wagnis Orange (No. 40)—available via download:) The entire cliff face is up to 80 metres (260 ft) high, and the 32-metre (105 ft) route ascends the vertical-to-overhanging limestone wall, characterised by roofs and bulges. The rock surface features crimps, pockets, and sinter cracks.

Due to the local microclimate, the holds frequently retain moisture. Therefore, successful climbing opportunities are limited. (Note: Original quote by Ondra: The hardest route on this outstanding wall but which is not friendly for trying hard routes because it's notoriously wet despite being exposed to the sun from 9am onwards, which means the only time to try it is early in the morning.) Guidebook writer Markus Stadler recommends seasonal windows in the spring and autumn for high-end climbing. (Note: Original German: Es handelt sich um eine Südwand, die aber im Spätherbst und frühen Winter aufgrund des gegenüberliegenden Berges eher wenig Sonne bekommt. Im Sommer ist es dafür meist zu heiß. Dazu sifft es relativ lange aus vielen Griffen. Viele Routen haben daher eher selten ideale Bedingungen. Die beste Zeit geht von Mitte September bis Mitte November sowie von März bis Mitte Mai.)

=== Section breakdown ===
In 2012, Ondra provided a breakdown of Qui's individual sections after several unsuccessful attempts. The ascent begins with the opening 10 metres (33 ft) of Wagnis Orange, a sustained stretch rated "at least" 8b+ (5.14a) difficulty, which he characterised by "bad crimps and slopers with poor rests".

Afterwards, Wagnis Orange traverses right, while Qui continues straight up. Following his 2020 ascent, German climber Roland Hemetzberger further detailed this transition, noting that this subsequent section begins with a "difficult, wide move", (Note: Original German: Ein schwieriger, weiter Zug rundet den unteren Teil von „Qui“ ab ...) bringing the route's difficulty up to around 8c (5.14b) or 8c+ (5.14c). Following this sequence, the route enters its main crux, which following the 2008 foothold breakage has a bouldering grade of approximately 8A (V11). (Note: Original German: ... und checkt circa 8c/8c+ ein. Unmittelbar darauf geht es dann in die Schlüsselstelle, dabei ist ein circa Fb 8a Boulder zu knacken.) Ondra noted that this section requires "tiny crimpy sidepulls at their very best", describing it as a "heinous boulder". A few more metres of sustained terrain then lead via vertical, technical climbing to the anchor. (Note: Original quote by Fürst in German: ... und dann die paar Meter bis zum Standplatz rauszuklettern.)

== Legacy ==
Wagnis Orange was re-evaluated as an 8c (5.14b) line following repeated ascents, making it retrospectively the first 8c (5.14b) in Austria (Note: Original German: ... Geisterschmiedwand... die erste 8c in Österreich, "Wagnis Orange", erstbegangen.)—and arguably the second or third route of this grade in climbing history, after Güllich's Wallstreet (1987) in the Franconian Jura and alongside Fred Nicole's Anaïs et le canabis (1988) in Swiss Saint-Loup. This development established the blue-grey limestone of the Geisterschmiedwand as a significant venue for sport climbing.

The focus of maximum difficulty at the cliff later shifted to Qui, an extension of Wagnis Orange that Fürst first ascended in 1996 and Ondra repeated in 2019. While the route had achieved a consensus grade of 9a (5.14d) over time, the subsequent breakage of a crucial foothold in 2008 significantly altered the crux, prolonging what would become a 23-year gap between the first ascent and the first repeat. Reflecting on the historical significance of the line, Ondra noted that "no matter how hard the route was in [the] state" of its first ascent, Qui "could have been one [of the] hardest routes" back in 1996.

Following his successful redpoint in 2019, Ondra upgraded the route to 9a+ (5.15a). The route was repeated by Hemetzberger in June 2020, followed by Alfons Dornauer in July 2022, with both climbers confirming Ondra's grading. In October 2023, Jakob Schubert became the fifth climber to successfully redpoint the route and also opted for the 9a+ (5.15a) rating. Spanish climbing magazine Wogu Cultura de Escalada described the line Qui as a "piece of sport climbing history".

== Ascents ==
- 1st. Stefan Fürst in 1996 (pre-hold break)
- 2nd. Adam Ondra on 19 September 2019 (post-hold break)
- 3rd. Roland Hemetzberger on 8 June 2020
- 4th. Alfons Dornauer on 13 July 2022
- 5th. Jakob Schubert on 2 October 2023

== See also ==
- History of rock climbing
- List of grade milestones in rock climbing
- Open Air, first climb in the world with a grade of 9a+ (5.15a)
- Action Directe, first climb in the world with a consensus grade of 9a (5.14d)
- Hubble, first climb in the world with a consensus grade of 8c+ (5.14c)

== Bibliography ==
- "A visionary in our time: Fred Nicole". www.8a.nu. 12 January 2008.
- "Adam Ondra crushes Qui, first repeat of Stefan Fürst 1996 masterpiece". PlanetMountain.com. 21 September 2019.
- "Adam Ondra sends 42nd 5.15a with repeat of Qui". Gripped Magazine. 22 September 2019.
- Fernández, Isaac (20 September 2019). "Adam Ondra repite la olvidada 'Qui' y la reevalúa como posible primer 9a+ de la historia" [Adam Ondra repeats the forgotten 'Qui' and re-evaluates it as possibly the first 9a+ in history.]. Desnivel.com (in Spanish). "Qui es una vía con primera ascensión a cargo de Stefan Fürst en 1996. En aquel entonces, la referencia era Action Directe, que conservaba su graduación original de 8c+/9a, así que el escalador austriaco la estrenó con propuesta de 8c+."
- "Gerhard Hörhager. Der Erschließer" [Gerhard Hörhager: The Pioneer]. Limit – the best crags in Tirol (in German). 1. Climbers Paradise Tirol. 2018.
- Heidorn, Gerhard (2015). "Der Hausmeister im Tal. Gerhard Hörhager und die Entwicklung des Sportkletterns im Zillertal" [The caretaker in the valley: Gerhard Hörhager and the development of sport climbing in the Zillertal] (PDF). Alpenvereinsjahrbuch Berg (in German). 139. München. Innsbruck, Bozen: Deutscher Alpenverein, Oesterreichischer Alpenverein, Alpenverein Südtirol: 32.
- "Jakob Schubert wiederholt Qui (9a+) an der Geisterschmiedwand" [Jakob Schubert repeats Qui (9a+) at the Geisterschmiedwand]. Kletterszene.com (in German). 16 October 2023. "Ich hatte Qui letztes Jahr schon einmal probiert, ein Griff in der Crux war aber immer nass. In dieser Saison war endlich alles trocken ..." [I had tried Qui once before last year, but a hold in the crux was wet. This season, everything was finally dry ...]
- "Jakob Schubert repite 'Qui' 9a+, una clásica de la vieja escuela" [Jakob Schubert repeats 'Qui' (9a+), a classic old-school route]. WOGU cultura de escalada (in Spanish). 11 October 2023. "... quinto ascensionista de este pedazo de historia de la escalada deportiva también ha escogido el 9a+." [... the fifth ascendant of this piece of sport climbing history has also chosen 9a+.]
- "Klettergarten Geisterschmiedwand" [Geisterschmiedwand climing crag]. Climbers Paradise Tirol (in German).
- Ondra, Adam (January 2012). "Adam Ondra, the routes I cannot climb!". PlanetMountain.com.
- Ondra, Adam (30 September 2019). Adam Ondra #33: Qui 9a+ / Adam's Nightmare. AO Production – via YouTube.
- "Qui 9a+". climbing-history.org.
- "Roland Hemetzberger gelingt Qui 9a+ an der Geisterschmiedwand" [Roland Hemetzberger sends Qui (9a+) at the Geisterschmiedwand]. Bergsteigen.com (in German). 18 June 2020.
- Słowakiewicz, Wojciech (21 September 2019). ""Qui" pierwsze powtórzenie po 23 latach. Nowy ekstrem na kartach historii" ["Qui": The first repeat ascent in 23 years. A new extreme enters the history books.]. wspinanie.pl (in Polish). ".... ale po powtórzeniach jest uważana za 8c, co sprawia, że jest najprawdopodobniej drugą taką linią w historii po Wallstreet (Wolfgang Gullich, 1987)." [... however, following subsequent ascents, it is considered 8c—making it most likely only the second such line in history, after Wallstreet (Wolfgang Güllich, 1987).]
- Stadler, Markus [in German] (23 August 2013). "Geisterschmiedwand". www.stadler-markus.de (in German).
- "Stefan Fürst" [Bulletins of the Austrian Alpine Club, Section Innsbruck] (PDF). Mitteilungen des österreichischen Alpenvereins, Zweig Innsbruck (in German). 3: 44. 1991. "Stefan Fürst geb. am 12. 5. 1969, Kirchberg (Österreich). Der 1,90 m große und nur 62 kg schwere Tiroler ..."
- Stöhr, Ralph (1 October 2020). "Roland Hemetzberger: der starke Bayer im Interview" [Roland Hemetzberger: the strong Bavarian in an interview]. outdoor-magazin.com (in German). "... Stefan Fürst – der war neunmal österreichischer Staatsmeister ..."
- "9a+ rain in Europe". Up-Climbing.com. 17 June 2020.
