= Vranjača Cave =

Coordinates: 43.5622°N 16.6487°E

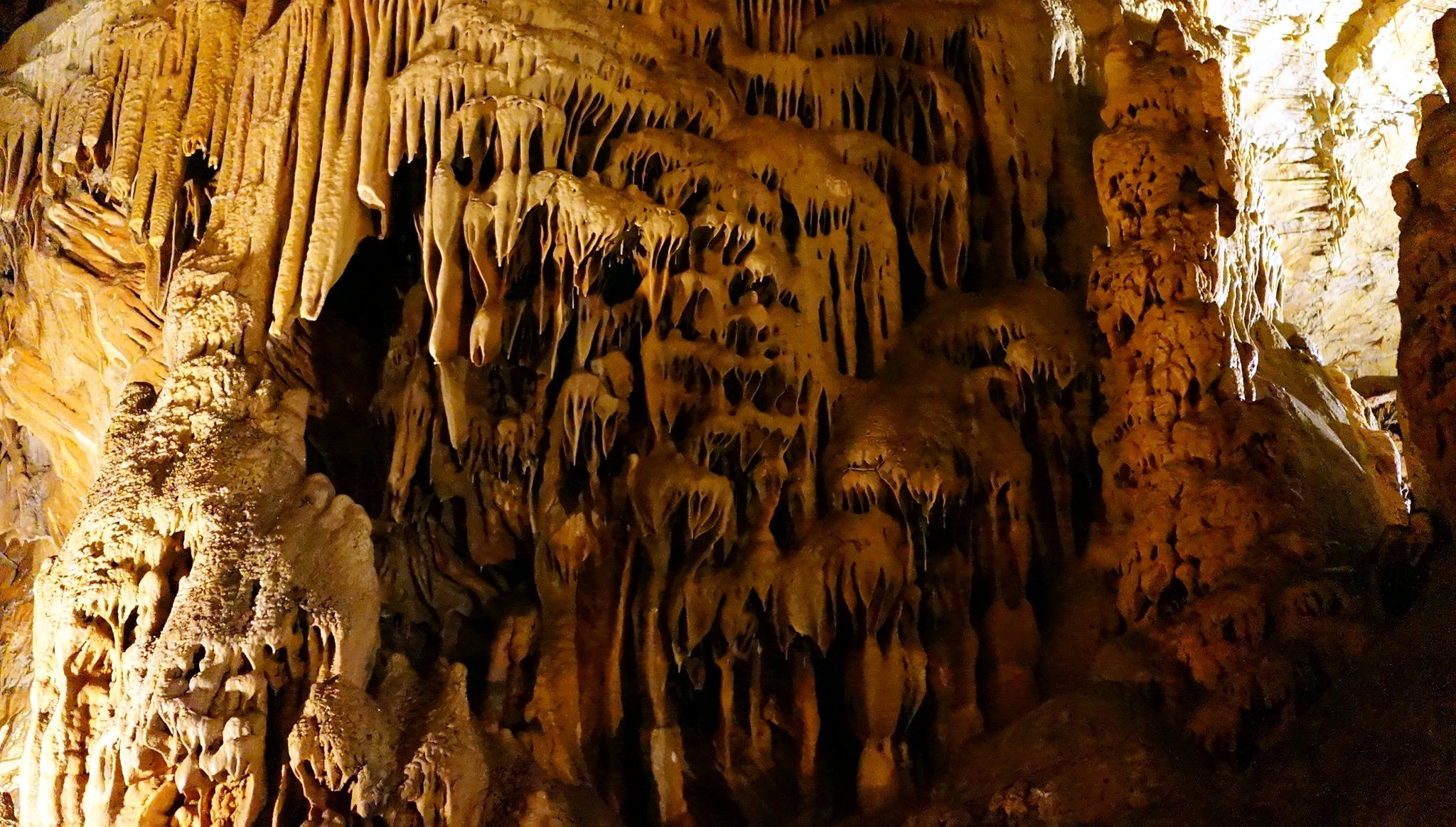
Limestone cave deposit in Vranjača Cave (Croatia)

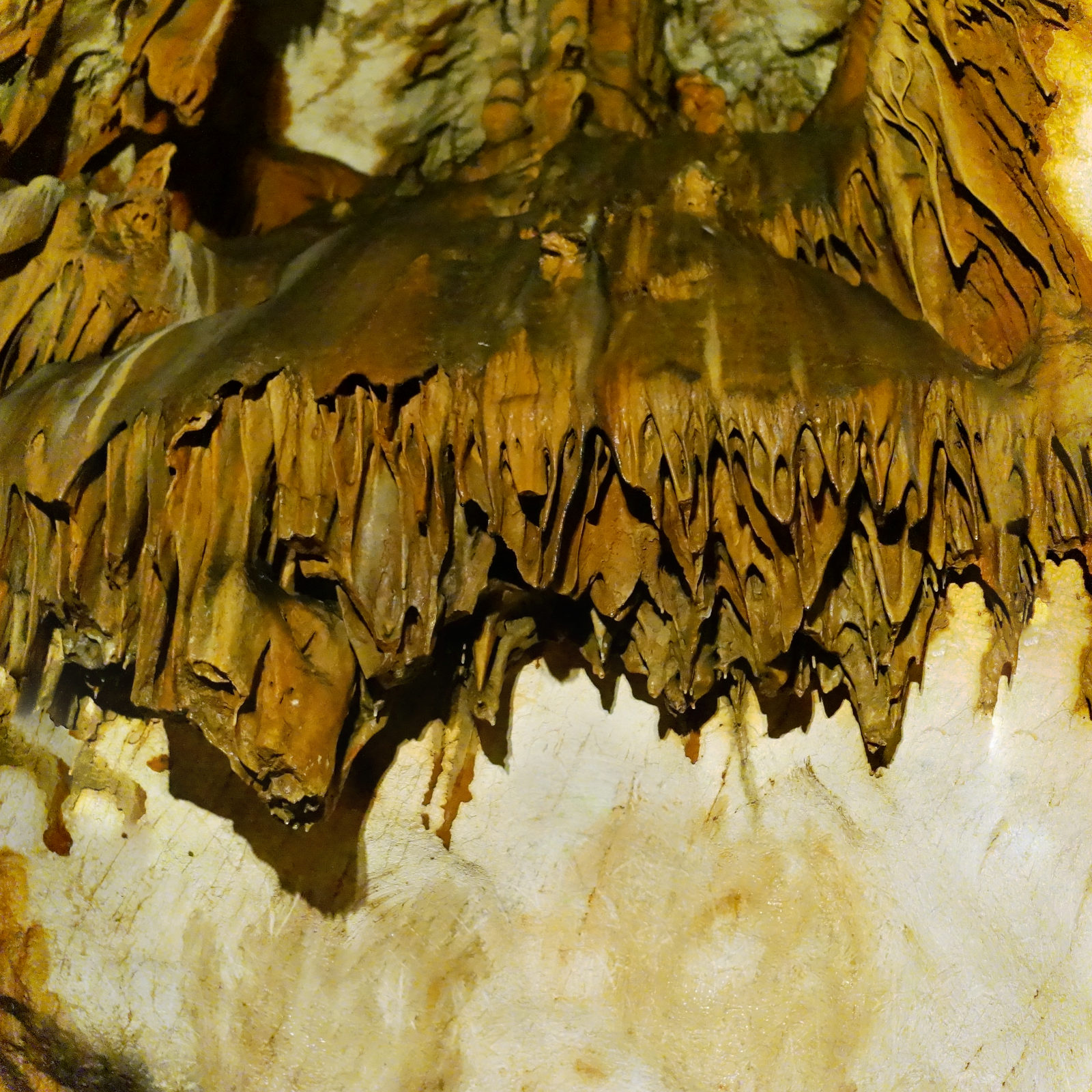
Flowstone detail

Vranjača Cave (pronounced [vraɲatʃa]; Croatian: Špilja Vranjača) is a karst cave in Croatia, on the northern slopes of the Mosor mountain near the village of Kotlenice, some 18 miles inland from Split. The cave is a Geomorphological Natural Monument of Croatia, and a significant site of Neolithic culture and post-diluvial fauna.

The cave was formed in rudist limestone as a ponor of an ancient stream.

== Description ==
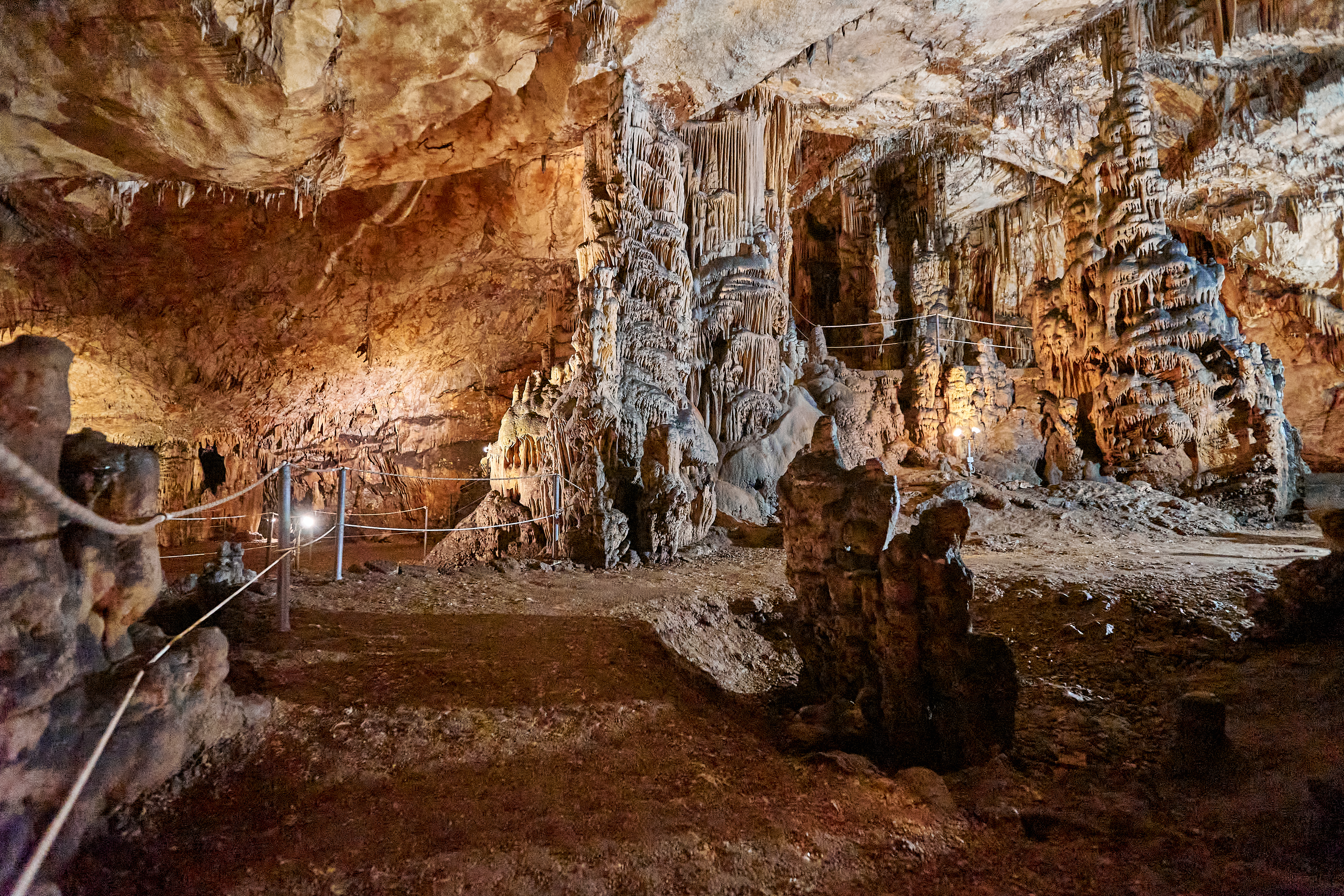

Vranjača cave consists of two large halls. The entrance hall, measuring about 65 by 20 meters, has no cave deposit formations. A narrow corridor leads to a 100 m long and 60 m wide hall with an abundance of stalagmites, stalactites and flowstone of many shapes and colors. The cave system starts at 450 m above sea-level, descends by 65 m, and is some 360 meters long.

The temperature inside the cave is, at 15 °C, constant throughout the year.

== History ==
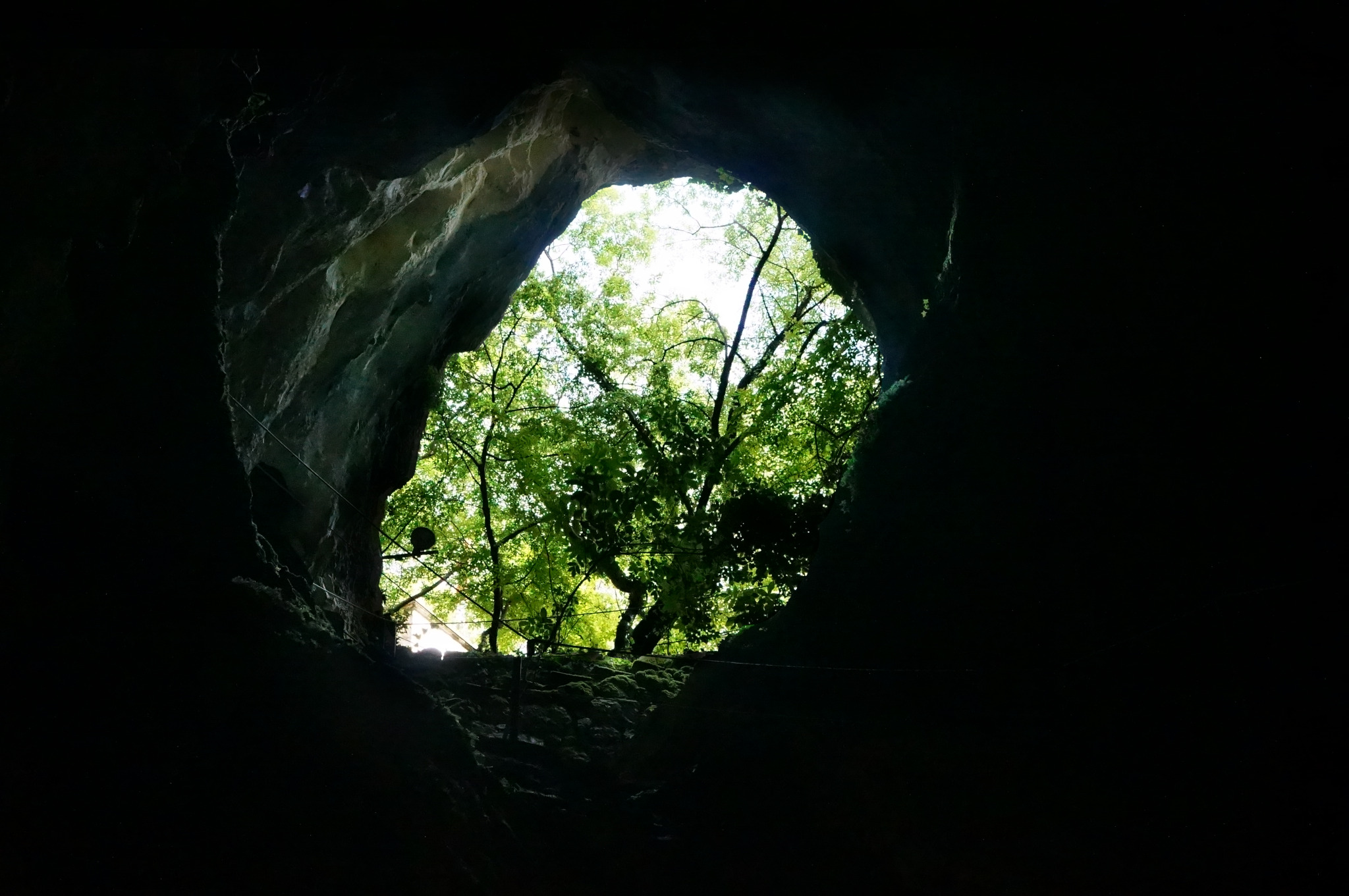
Cave entrance from inside

The entrance hall of the cave was known to the locals long before the second hall was discovered in 1903 by the land owner Stipe Punda. The first drawing of the cave by miner Luigi Miotto reaches Fritz von Kerner, a geologist from Viena who in 1905 publishes the first description of the cave alongside Miotto's sketch in his article Die Grotte von Kotlenice am Nordfuße der Mosor planina. The first mention of the name Vranjača appeared in the 1905 publication of Prirodni zemljopis Hrvatske by Dragutin Hirc. Two high-school professors from Split, Umberto Girometta and Ramiro Bujas, conduct first scientific explorations of the cave and publish their findings in 1911–1914. Girometta discovers a new eyeless spider species, named after him Stalita Giromettai.

The cave became available to the public in 1929 when local enthusiasts and members of the Research of Karst Phenomena Section of the Mountaineering Association Mosor from Split, led by mining engineer Rade Mikačić, built an access road, cave stairway, and installed rope railings and electric lights.

In 1934 and 1935, below the layers of clay, loam and ashes, Girometta excavates shards of early Neolithic unornamented earthenware and scorched bone fragments of post-diluvial animals. In deeper strata remains of Fallow deer (Cervus dama) and the extinct species Cave bear (Ursus spealeus) were found.

== See also ==
- List of Dinaric caves
