= Osp =

Village in southwest Slovenia

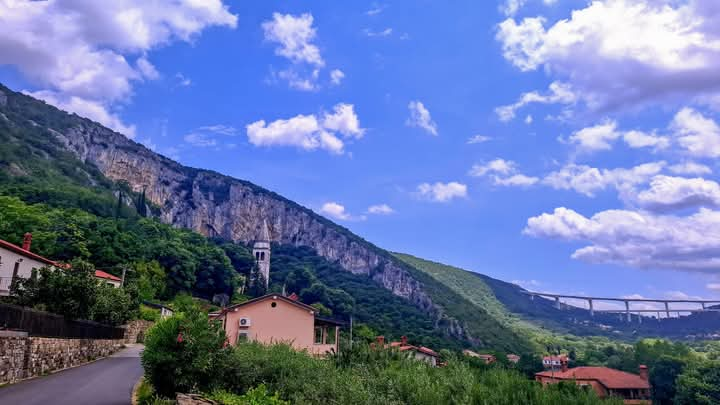

- Location in Slovenia
- Coordinates: 45°34′21.51″N 13°51′23.27″E
- Country: Slovenia
- Traditional region: Littoral
- Statistical region: Coastal–Karst
- Municipality: Koper

Area
  - Total: 6.65 km^{2} (2.57 sq mi)
- Elevation: 45 m (148 ft)

Population (2002)
  - Total: 166

Osp (pronounced [ˈoːsp]; Italian: Ospo) is a village in the City Municipality of Koper in the Littoral region of Slovenia, near the city of Trieste.

== Overview ==
The Osp Valley is a passage through the karst and coastal region of Istria. It extends from below the village of Črni Kal to the sea. The valley was shaped by the Osp River. Osp is also one of the oldest villages in Slovenia, first mentioned in 1067. It was the first villages on the Istrian peninsula to have a Slovene school. The village is well known for its rock walls, which offer free climbing all year long.

The village is a border crossing into Italy, with the village of Crociata (Slovene: Križpot), Caresana (Slovene: Mačkolje), in the comune (municipality) of San Dorligo della Valle.

The parish church in the settlement is dedicated to Saint Peter.
