= Chris Sharma =

American rock climber (born 1981)

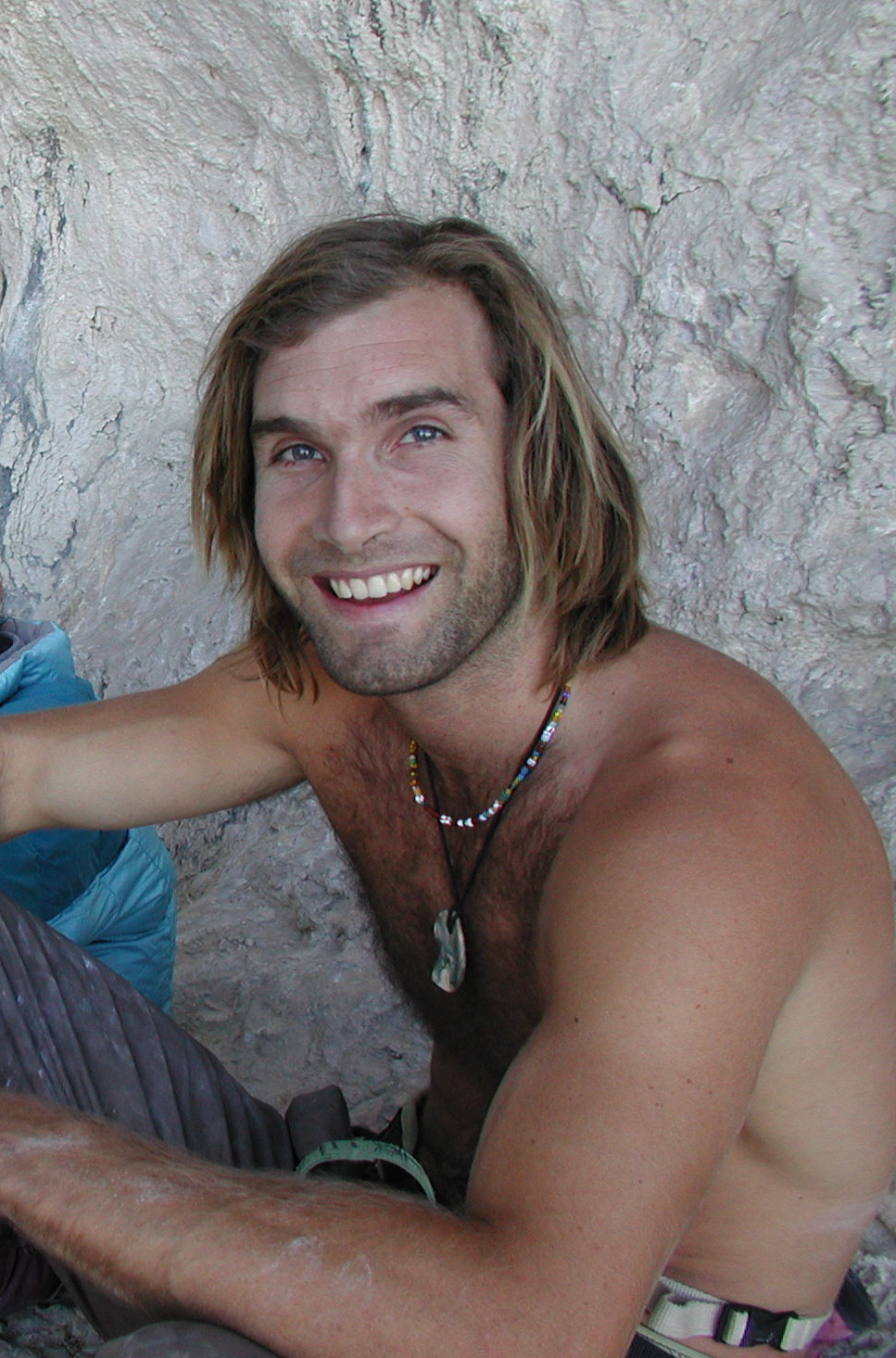
- Sharma in 2008

Personal information
- Born: 23 April 1981 (age 45) Santa Cruz, California, U.S.
- Occupation: Professional rock climber
- Height: 6 ft 0 in (183 cm)
- Weight: 165 lb (75 kg)
- Spouse: Jimena Alarcón (m. 2015)
- Children: 2
- Website: www.chrissharma.com

Climbing career
- Type of climber: Sport climbing; Bouldering; Deep water solo; Competition climbing
- Ape index: +6.4 cm (3 in)
- Highest grade: Redpoint: 5.15c (9b+); Onsight/Flash: 5.14b (8c); Bouldering: V15 (8C)
- First ascents: The Mandala (V12, 2000); Realization (5.15a, 2001); Es Pontàs (5.15a, 2006); Jumbo Love (5.15b 2008)
- Retired from competition: c. 2002
- Known for: First to climb consensus sport 9a+ (5.15a), (Note: It is possible that it was not the actual first-ever 9a+ route to be climbed, as in 2008 Czech climber Adam Ondra estimated that Alexander Huber's 1996 ascent of Open Air was at 9a+ (5.15a). Climbing author Andrew Bisharat notes in a 2016 essay on climbing re-grades, that "The other interesting point about Open Air that’s worth mentioning is that the route reportedly contains some rather flaky holds that have broken off over the years. So was the Open Air that Ondra climbed the exact same route that Alex Huber climbed? Maybe, but probably not.") 9b (5.15b), and second to climb 9b+ (5.15c); First to climb DWS grades at 9a+ (5.15a)
Medal record
Men's competition climbing
Representing United States
World Championships
Silver medal – second place	1997 Paris	Lead
World Youth Championships
Gold medal – first place	1995	Lead
- Updated on 20 June 2022

Chris Omprakash Sharma (born 23 April 1981) is an American rock climber who is considered one of the greatest and most influential climbers in the history of the sport. He dominated sport climbing for the decade after his 2001 ascent of Realization/Biographie, the first-ever redpoint of a consensus 9a+ (5.15a) graded route, and ushered in what was called a "technical evolution" in the sport. Sharma carried the mantle of "world's strongest sport climber" from Wolfgang Güllich (who held it for almost a decade from the early 1980s), and passed it to Adam Ondra (who held it from 2012).

In 2008, Sharma redpointed the first-ever consensus 9b (5.15b) route with Jumbo Love, and in 2013, became only the second-ever person to climb a 9b+ (5.15c) route with La Dura Dura. Sharma is also known for free soloing the first-ever 9a+ (5.15a) deep-water solo route, Es Pontàs in 2006. Sharma became one of the most commercially successful climbers in his sport, and was noted for his "King Lines" – iconic routes that inspired him to spend the months and even years needed to climb them – some of which feature in the award-winning 2007 climbing film, King Lines.

== Early life ==
Chris Omprakash Sharma was born and raised in Santa Cruz, California, the only child of Gita Jahn and Bob Sharma. His parents were devotees of the yogi Baba Hari Dass, and adopted the surname Sharma when they got married. He went to Mount Madonna, and attended Soquel High School for a year. Sharma started rock climbing when he was 12 at the Pacific Edge Climbing Gym, and he described himself as "one of the first climbing-gym-generation kids".

== Climbing career ==
=== 1996–2002 (to Realization) ===
From the outset, Sharma was considered a prodigy in the climbing world. At age 14, he won the adult 1996 US Open Bouldering Nationals, and a year later aged 15, he freed Boone Speed's project Necessary Evil 5.14c (8c+) in the Virgin River Gorge, the hardest sport climb in North America at the time. The following year, Sharma won silver at the biennial UIAA World Championships at Paris, and gold at the Kranj leg of the UIAA World Cup, both for lead climbing. Still 16, he suffered a serious knee injury that sidelined him for over a year. (Note: In various interviews, Sharma describes that this period had a profound effect on his outlook on life and climbing and that he spent time reading into Buddhism and meditation techniques, noting that "You learn to be patient, sit tight, and not add more mental strife to an already difficult situation".) Aged 18, Sharma moved to Bishop, California, and began a US bouldering revolution with his 1999 film Rampage, and in February 2000, completed the first ascent of The Mandala, a world-famous boulder problem.

On 18 July 2001, aged 20, Sharma completed the extension of the 8c+ (5.14c) route Biographie in Ceüse in France, and named it Realization; the route was the first consensus 9a+ (5.15a) in the world, and has since become an important route in the history of sport climbing, with Climbing magazine noting that "technical rock climbing jumped in its evolution". It was the first confirmed increase in grades since Wolfgang Gullich's ascent of Action Directe 9a (5.14d), a decade earlier. Sharma's ascent of the route was captured in Josh Lowell's 2002 film, Dosage Volume 1. Days later, Sharma won the Munich leg of the IFSC World Cup in bouldering, only to be disqualified on testing positive for marijuana.

=== 2002–2008 (to Jumbo Love) ===
After Realization, Sharma considered quitting climbing and went on Buddhist pilgrimages. A 2003 trip to Mallorca, Spain to meet Miquel Riera, a pioneer of deep-water soloing, led him to "fall in love with climbing all over again". Sharma largely abandoned competitions, (Note: In a 2011 interview with Climbing magazine editor Jeff Achey, Sharma said "Personally, that’s not ever really been my deal. I mean, competitions are fun, but 15 minutes after the competition they take the holds off. It's way more important for me to put up new routes and develop my vision in rock climbing. Create a legacy, create something lasting. No one remembers who won the freakin’ World Cup in 1997, but people know who put up Action Directe.) to focus on "King Lines", a term he adopted for iconic routes that motivated him. (Note: The term "King Lines" was originally coined by climber Klem Loskot, but after the 2007 climbing film King Lines, it became associated with Sharma's drive to find and climb iconic routes.) In 2004, Sharma solved the boulder problem Practice of the Wild V15 (8C), and in 2005 solved the dramatic roof of Witness the Fitness V15 (8C), followed by redpointing Dreamcatcher 9a (5.14d), regarded as one of North America's most iconic sport climbs. In 2006, he made an early repeat of La Rambla 9a+ (5.15a), and in 2006, after 50 attempts, stuck the crux dyno of Es Pontàs in Mallorca, the world's first-ever 5.15a (9a+) DWS route. Some of Sharma's climbs from this era are in the iconic and award-winning 2007 climbing film, King Lines.

In 2007, Sharma moved to Lleida, a town near the Spanish Pyrenees, in Catalonia, Spain, and over the next five years, created an unprecedented series of new 9a+ (5.15a) to 9b (5.15b) sport climbs, predominantly in Catalonian limestone crags (namely Oliana, Siurana, Santa Linya and Margalef), starting with the 9a+ (5.15a) classic of Papichulo in May 2008. (Note: Realization, La Rambla and Papichulo have become known as the "9a+ trilogy", as they are regarded as classic benchmark 9a+/5.15a test-pieces for extreme sport climbers.) In September 2008, Sharma made a trip back to the United States and climbed the world's first-ever consensus 5.15b (9b) route when he freed Randy Leavitt's 250-foot (76 m) bolted route, Jumbo Love in Clark Mountain in California.

=== 2008–2013 (to La Dura Dura) ===
Sharma said that after climbing Jumbo Love, he needed to change his approach. His previous breakthroughs had been on routes established and bolted by other climbers who had given up on them, (Note: Necessary Evil 5.14c (8c+) was shown to him by its creator Boone Speed (who became a mentor to Sharma), Realization 5.15a (9a+) was created and developed by French climbers Jean-Christophe Lafaille and Arnaud Petit, while Jumbo Love 5.15b (9b) was bolted by Randy Leavitt who invited Sharma to try it as a potential 5.15b/c.) and now he needed to find his own limit saying: "I wanted to push myself to the next level. Where is that? I had to discover it. That was a big process in itself. So I bolted all these routes [in Spain]. And a lot of them ended up being that next level". The period saw Sharma bolt and free numerous new extreme 9b (5.15b)-graded "King Lines", including Golpe de Estado (2008), Neanderthal (2009), and First Round First Minute (2011), each a major project in itself and since regarded as important classics, with Sharma saying "That's the thing about being on the cutting edge. You have to invent it".

In 2011, Sharma invited the then 19-year-old climbing prodigy Adam Ondra, to try an Oliana route he had bolted in 2009 called La Dura Dura, which Sharma himself had given up on saying "I never saw myself being able to climb it.", and "I figured it would be for the next generation". For the next year, the two climbers worked the route in a collaborative process that saw Ondra make the first ascent in February 2013, and Sharma make the first repeat in March 2013. National Geographic called their collaboration a defining moment in the sport of rock climbing, when the title of "world's best climber" had begun to pass from one generation to the next. Both Ondra and Sharma declared the collaboration to be a very positive experience with Sharma saying post his March ascent: "It was a healthy process for both of us, we fed off each other's motivation and through him, I think I became a better climber myself". Their collaboration was documented in Reel Rock 7 (2012), and La Dura Complete (2013).

=== Post 2013 ===
At 9b+ (5.15c), La Dura Dura would hold the rank of "world's hardest climb" (Note: Ondra confirmed that La Dura Dura was harder than the world's only other 9b+ route, Change, which was climbed by Ondra in 2013 in Norway. In August 2022, French climber Seb Bouin, frequent climbing partner of Ondra, made the third ascent of Change and felt that the discovery of a kneebar made the grade it 9b/9b+ (5.15b/c), thus making La Dura Dura the world's first-ever 9b+.) until Ondra climbed Silence at 9c (5.15d) in 2017, and while Sharma would put up several more "King Lines" over the next 5 years, it marked the high-point in terms of his hardest route. In 2015, he freed El Bon Combat, considered at the time to be close to 9b+ (5.15c), and in 2016 he soloed Alasha, the world's first 9b (5.15b) DWS route. One of Sharma's unfinished projects was a potential 9c (5.15d) route in Oliana beside La Dura Dura called Le Blond, named in memory of Patrick Edlinger; it remains unfinished. In March 2023, aged 41, Sharma made the first redpoint of Sleeping Lion, a 9b+ (5.15c) route beside La Rambla in Spain, which he described as the hardest thing he had done in over eight years. After completing the second ascent of the route in January 2024, Alexander Megos proposed that Sleeping Lion be downgraded to 9b (5.15b). At the same time in 2023, noting that neighboring Golpe de Estado has never had a third ascent, Sharma wondered if it was a really 9b+ (5.15c) graded route, which would have made it the world's first-ever at that grade.

== Legacy ==
Sharma is widely considered one of the greatest and most important rock climbers in the history of the sport. Sharma took on the title of "world's strongest sport climber" in 2001 from Wolfgang Gullich (who dominated in the decade from the early 1980s to the early 1990s), and passed it on to Adam Ondra (who dominated after 2012). In 2003, the LA Times called him the "greatest natural rock climber in the world". In 2007, Melissa Block on NPR's All Things Considered, introduced him saying "Chris Sharma is hailed as the world's best rock climber, a pioneer who has mastered some of the most spectacular and difficult routes in the history of the sport". In 2016, Outside said "Sharma shaped modern rock climbing. Whatever he thought was cool, we followed. Bouldering. Projecting hard sport routes. Deep water soloing. In 2022, Climbing said: "The pioneering American sport climber is among the best to ever tie in, and was arguably the world's strongest rock climber for almost 20 years".

Sharma is noted for a "humble softly-spoken meditative disposition" (who often leaves it to others to grade his routes) coupled with a "highly aggressive and dynamic" climbing style. In 2016, Climbing said: "Over the past three decades, Sharma has cultivated a mellow Southern California persona, but in reality, he's one of the most competitive, focused, and driven athletes out there". His demeanor has been ascribed to his Buddhist raising; the LA Times called him "the Karma Climber". He has credited Zen meditation techniques with helping him on routes, or when seeking direction and motivation. Sharma was also known for eschewing any gym-based training (including fingerboards or cross-training) or dieting, preferring to climb as his sole method of training.

Sharma is credited with developing the commercial potential of extreme sport-climbing, with Climbing saying "Not only did Sharma have the guns to become the first human to climb 5.15, he had the genius to see the potential, coupled with the commitment to spend months and years of his life proving it", and calling Sharma "arguably the highest-paid pro climber in the world". Outside added, "Before Sharma figured out how to balance elite performance with making a living, "professional climber" was an oxymoron. Sharma's commercial appeal, and becoming one of the most filmed climbers, was attributed to his focus on "King Lines", which Sharma described as: "It's not enough to do something hard; it needs to be in an amazing position, a route that asks you to pour your heart and soul into climbing it".

== Personal life ==
Sharma is the founder of the rock climbing gym Sender One, headquartered in Santa Ana, California, which he opened in 2013 as a business partnership with Walltopia, who was a sponsor of Sharma. In 2015, he opened a second gym, Sharma Climbing BCN, in Barcelona in Spain, and in 2021 he opened a third gym, Sharma Climbing Gava, on the outskirts of Barcelona.

Sharma was in a long-term public relationship with the Spanish professional climber Daila Ojeda, and they lived together in Oliana. In August 2015, he married Venezuelan model and television personality Jimena Alarcón, and the couple moved from Oliana to Barcelona. Their first child, a daughter named Alana, was born in June 2016, and their second child, a son, in 2019.

=== Zen ===
Sharma's parents were practising Zen Buddhists (although they did not live in at the Mount Madonna ashram) and for long periods Sharma has followed Zen routines (including daily 5.45am temple meditation). Sharma has been on various Asian pilgrimages lasting several months, including the Shikoku Pilgrimage in Japan that he undertook after climbing Realization in 2001.

The 2010 book Climbing: Because It's There (Philosophy for Everyone) discussed the impact of Zen Buddhism on Sharma saying: "Sharma's affinity for Buddhism, and Zen in particular, is well documented in film and print. He exemplifies the spirit of Zen, being humble (but potent), ordinary (but extraordinary), self-aware, and most of all, authentic".

Sharma has however rejected the label of "spiritual climber", saying in 2011: "To be stereotyped like that definitely detracts from me personally. Like I said, I'm totally happy talking about this stuff. I just don’t want to make some image for myself like I’m some sort of saint or something. I get frustrated, and I get bummed out". Sharma is no longer a practicing Zen Buddhist, and said in 2022: "Climbing is fully engaging… it’s an easy way to access that [meditative] state of mind… easier than sitting down and meditating".

== Notable ascents ==
=== Redpointed routes ===
9b+ (5.15c):

- La Dura Dura – Oliana (ESP) – 23 March 2013. Sharma developed and bolted the route, and made the first repeat after Adam Ondra's February 2013 first ascent.

- Sleeping Lion – Siurana (ESP) – 28 March 2023. First ascent of a route that Sharma developed and bolted. In 2024, Alexander Megos proposed that it be downgraded to 9b (5.15b).

9b/+ (5.15b/c):

- El Bon Combat – Cova de l'Ocell (ESP) – 7 March 2015. First ascent; described by Sharma as a "King Line", now considered closer to 5.15b, but a classic.

9b (5.15b):

- Jumbo Love – Clark Mountain (USA) – 11 September 2008. First ascent, and world's first-ever 9b (5.15b) route. Repeated by Ethan Pringle (2015), and Jonathan Siegrist (2018).
- Golpe de Estado – Siurana (ESP) – 17 December 2008. First ascent, and the first-ever 9b (5.15b) to be repeated when Adam Ondra climbed it in March 2010 (it was Ondra's first-ever 9b). In 2023, noting that it has never had a 3rd ascent, Sharma wondered if it was a 9b+ (5.15c).
- Neanderthal – Santa Linya (ESP) – 18 December 2009. First ascent. Second ascent by Jakob Schubert (2018), and third, after almost a decade of attempts, by Adam Ondra (2019).
- First Round First Minute – Margalef (ESP) – 19 April 2011. First ascent. First repeat by Adam Ondra (2014), second by Alex Megos (2016), and third by Stefano Ghisolfi (2017).
- Fight or Flight – Oliana (ESP) – 5 May 2011. First ascent. First repeat by Adam Ondra (2013); the "first 9b" for many others (Jakob Schubert (2015), Sachi Amma (2015), Matty Hong (2018)).
- Stoking the Fire – Santa Linya (ESP) – 6 February 2013. First ascent. First repeat by Adam Ondra (2016), and like Fight or Flight, a popular 9b route.

9a+ (5.15a):

- Realization – Céüse (FRA) – 18 July 2001. First ascent and the world's first-ever consensus 9a+ (5.15a) route; features in Dosage Volume 1.
- Papichulo – Oliana (ESP) – 31 May 2008. First ascent. First repeat by Adam Ondra (2009), and has since become one of the most repeated and popular 9a+ routes.
- Demencia Senil – Margalef (ESP) – 20 February 2009. First ascent. First repeated by Iker Pou (2010), and second repeat by Ramón Julián Puigblanqué (2010).
- Pachamama – Oliana (ESP) – 29 May 2009. First ascent. First repeated by Sachi Amma (2011), and then by Ramón Julián Puigblanqué (2015), and Adam Ondra (2017).
- First Ley – Margalef (ESP) – 28 February 2010. First ascent. Shorter 15m route that avoids the 9b finish of First Round First Minute; popular "first 9a+" with several repeats.
- Power Inverter – Oliana (ESP) – December, 2010. First Ascent. First repeated by Ramón Julián Puigblanqué (2014), and then by Sachi Amma (2015).
- Catxasa – Santa Linya (ESP) – 14 January 2011. First Ascent. First repeated by Ramón Julián Puigblanqué (2012); numerous repeats.
- La Rambla – Siurana (ESP) – 1 December 2006. Third ascent (just a day after the second ascent), and made Sharma the first climber to have climbed multiple confirmed 5.15a (9a+) routes.

9a (5.14d):

- Dreamcatcher – Squamish, British Columbia (CDN) – September, 2005. First ascent. Bolted with Sonnie Trotter, since considered one of the most iconic climbs in North America.
- Three Degrees of Separation – Céüse (FRA) – July, 2007. First ascent. Right of Realization and uses 3 large dynos; the first repeat was by Adam Ondra (2015), who felt it was a 9a+.
- Era Vella – Margalef (ESP) – March, 2010. First ascent. Sharma did it warming up and called a "soft 9a"; it became a popular "first 9a", but the grade is now considered 8c+/9a.
- Samfaina – Margalef (ESP) – June, 2010. First ascent. Sharma felt it was 9a, but Jorge Díaz-Rullo and Alex Megos suggest 9a+.

8c+ (5.14c):

- Necessary Evil – Virgin River Gorge (USA) – 1997. First ascent. Sharma, aged 15, freed Boone Speed's project to create North America's hardest route at the time.

=== Onsighted routes ===
8c (5.14b):

- French Gangster – Yangshuo (CHN) – April, 2009. Hardest route in China at the time (renamed from American Gangster).
- Humildes Pa' Casa – Oliana (ESP) – December, 2008.
- Divine Fury – Maple Canyon (USA) – September, 2008.
- T-Rex – Maple Canyon (USA) – September, 2008.
- Snuff Movies – Sant Llorenç del Munt (ESP) – May, 2015.
- V for Vendatta – Siurana (ESP) – 1 April 2022. Sharma was about to turn 41, and it was his sixth time onsighting 8c.

=== Deep-water solo routes ===
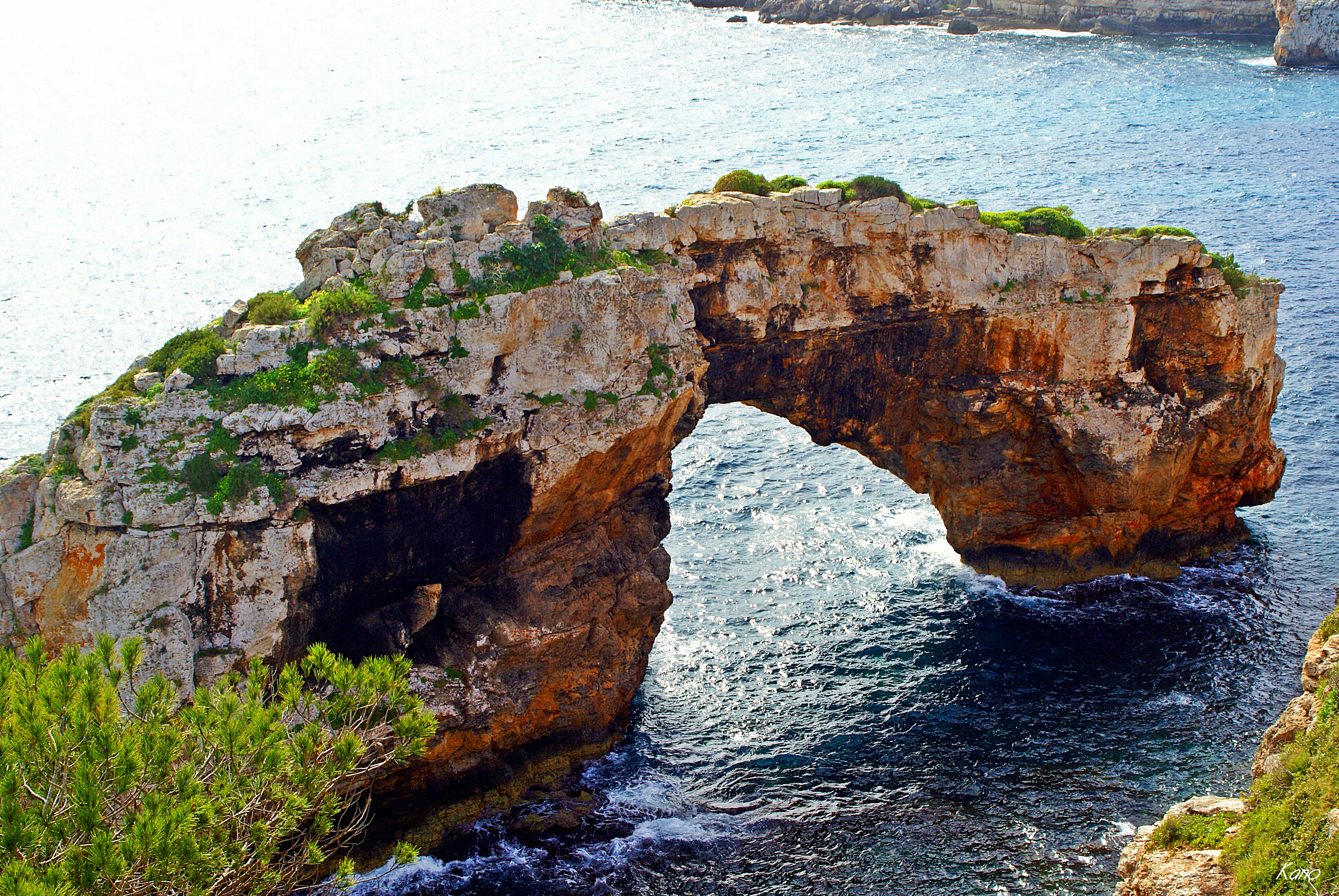
Es Pontàs, Mallorca. Sharma's route climbs the roof of the sea arch finishing at its apex.

9a+ (5.15a):

- Es Pontàs – Mallorca (ESP) – 26 September 2006. First ascent, and featured in the film King Lines. World's first-ever DWS at 9a+, and considered one of the most spectacular in the sport. First repeat by Jernej Kruder (2016), then Jan Hojer (2018) and Jakob Schubert (2021).

9a (5.14d):

- Alasha – Mallorca (ESP) – 16 September 2016. First ascent (named for his daughter Alana). Sharma felt it would be 9a with bolts, but as a DWS route was closer to 9b. First repeat by Jakob Schubert in 2021 who felt it was a 9a DWS route.

=== Boulder problems ===
V15 (8C):

- Practice of the Wild – Magic Wood, (CHE) – August, 2004. First ascent. First repeat by Tyler Landman, then Daniel Woods; possible 8B+/C .
- Witness the Fitness – Ozarks (USA) – March, 2005. First ascent of 40-foot (12 m) roof and filmed in Dosage 3. Repeated by Fred Nicole and Daniel Woods, but unclimbable after hold broke.
- Catalan Witness the Fitness – Cova de l’Ocell (Barcelona, ESP) – January, 2016. First ascent. A tunnel-like, horizontal roof; possible 8B+/C .

V12 (8A+):

- The Mandala – The Buttermilks (Bishop, USA) – February, 2000. First Ascent of an iconic boulder problem. Several holds have since broken, and it is speculated the original grade was V14 (8B+).

== Bibliography ==
- Why We Climb: The World's Most Inspiring Climbers (Chris Noble), 2017, Falcon Guides. pages 239–261 ISBN 978-1493018536.

== Filmography ==
- Sharma's 1999 bouldering tour of California: Lowell, Josh (director) (1999). Rampage (Motion picture). Big UP Productions. ASIN B000GD5FNS.
- Sharma's 2001 ascent of Realization: Lowell, Josh (director) (2001). Dosage Volume I (Motion picture). Big UP Productions. ASIN B000NOK288.
- Sharma's 2005 ascent of the roof of Witness the Fitness: Lowell, Josh (director) (2005). Dosage Volume III (Motion picture). Big UP Productions. ASIN B00YKPDS96.
- Sharma's 2005 ascent of Dreamcatcher: Lowell, Josh (director) (2005). Dosage Volume IV (Motion picture). Big UP Productions. ASIN B000JQK8BG.
- Sharma's 2007 ascent of Es Pontas, and Three Degrees: Mortimer, Peter (director) (2007). King Lines (Motion picture). Sender Films. ASIN B000XW1NV0.
- Ondra and Sharma's 2012 attempts on La Dura Dura: Lowell, Josh (director) (2012). Reel Rock 7 (Motion picture). Sender Films.
- Ondra and Sharma's 2013 ascents on La Dura Dura: Lowell, Josh (director) (2014). La Dura Complete (Motion picture). Big UP Productions.
- The Climb. Reality TV series with Meagan Martin and Jason Mamoa, 2023.

== Competitions ==
- 1995 Annual IFSC Climbing World Youth Championships (Lead, Youth B for age 14-15), Laval event. Gold Medal.
- 1996 Annual U.S. Open Bouldering Nationals. Gold Medal. Sharma was aged 14 when he won the adult open competition.
- 1997 Biennial UIAA Climbing World Championships (Lead), Paris event. Silver Medal. Sharma was aged 16.
- 1997 UIAA World Cup (Lead), Kranj event. Gold Medal. Sharma was aged 16.
- 1999 Summer X Games, San Francisco (Bouldering). Gold Medal. Sharma was aged 17.
- 2000 Wasatch Open Bouldering Competition.
- 2001 18th Annual Phoenix Bouldering Contest.
- 2001 IFSC World Cup (Bouldering), Munich event. Gold Medal, but subsequently disqualified when testing positive for marijuana.

After 2001, Sharma largely abandoned most competition climbing but did take part in various US events:

- 2002 Ford Gorge Games
- 2003 Earth Treks Roc Comp
- 2004 Earth Treks Roc Comp
- 2004 American Bouldering Series, third round of the 2003–04 Series (ABS5).
- 2007 Mammut Bouldering Championships
- 2008 Mammut Bouldering Championships
- 2009 Ilerbloc Open Internacional
- 2010 Earth Treks Roc Comp
- 2010 Psicobloc Masters Series, Bilbao, Spain. The world's first DWS competition.

== See also ==
- List of grade milestones in rock climbing
- History of rock climbing
- Josune Bereziartu, greatest female sport climber of the 1990s and 2000s
- Wolfgang Güllich, greatest sport climber of the 1980s
