= Sachi Amma =

Japanese rock climber (born 1989)

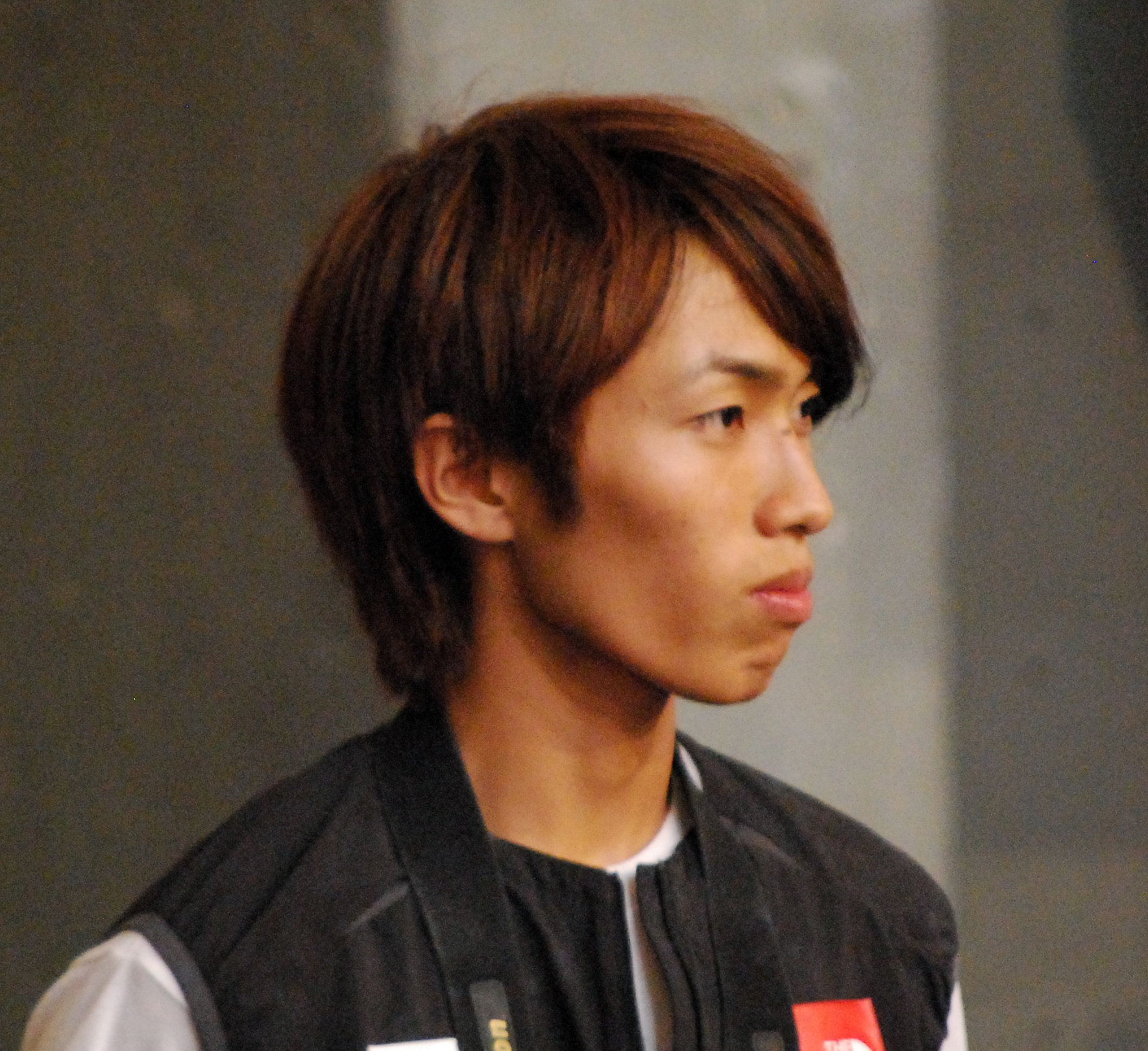

Personal information
- Nationality: Japanese
- Born: September 23, 1989 (age 36) Tochigi Prefecture, Japan
- Occupation: Professional sport climber
- Height: 172 cm (5 ft 8 in)
- Weight: 53 kg (117 lb)

Climbing career
- Type of climber: Lead climbing
- Highest grade: Redpoint: 9b (5.15b)
- Known for: Winning the World Cup in 2012 and 2013
Medal record
Men's sport climbing
Representing Japan
World Championships
Bronze medal – third place	2014 Gijón	Lead
World Cup
Second place	2009	Combined
Third place	2009	Lead
Third place	2010	Combined
Third place	2011	Lead
Winner	2012	Lead
Third place	2012	Combined
Winner	2013	Lead
Third place	2013	Combined
- Updated on October 31, 2017

Sachi Amma (born September 23, 1989) is a Japanese professional rock climber and sport climber. He won the IFSC Climbing World Cup twice, in 2012 and 2013.

== Biography ==
In 2006 he started competing at the World Cup, in the Lead climbing discipline, and won the Cup twice, in 2012 and 2013. In 2009, 2010 and 2012 he also competed, occasionally, in the Bouldering discipline, with less encouraging results.

He mainly climbs indoor, but he also proved to be one of the strongest rock climbers in the world, by redpointing three routes graded 9a+ (5.15a): Papichulo (Oliana), Pachamama (Oliana), and La Rambla (Siurana).

He has since redpointed one additional 9a+ (5.15a): Realization (Céüse) and two routes graded 9b (5.15b): Soul Mate (Gozen Iwa) and Fight or Flight (Oliana), the former becoming Japan's hardest sport climb.

== Rankings ==
=== Climbing World Cup ===
	2005	2006	2007	2008	2009	2010	2011	2012	2013	2014	2015
Lead	35	18	12	5	3	5	3	1	1	7	30
Bouldering	-	-	-	-	50	79	-	21	26	-	-
Combined	-	-	-	-	2	3	-	3	3	-	-

=== Climbing World Championships ===
	2007	2009	2011	2012	2014
Lead	21	4	10	7	3

== Number of medals in the Climbing World Cup ==
=== Lead ===
Season	Gold	Silver	Bronze	Total
2008		1	1	2
2009		2	1	3
2010			1	1
2011		4	3	7
2012	2	2	2	6
2013	3	2	1	6
2014	2	1	1	4
Total	7	12	10	29

== Rock climbing ==
=== Redpointed routes ===
9b (5.15b):

- Sleeping Lion – Siurana (ESP) – March 15, 2026 – First ascent by Chris Sharma, 2023
- Soul Mate – Gozen Iwa (JPN) – March 2018 – First ascent. Described as Japan's hardest route and first 9b.
- Fight or Flight – Oliana (ESP) – February 2015 – First ascent by Chris Sharma.

9a+ (5.15a):

- Realization – Céüse (FRA) – August 6, 2014 – First ascent by Chris Sharma, 2001
- La Rambla – Siurana (ESP) – November 29, 2012 – First ascent by Ramón Julián Puigblanqué, 2003
- Pachamama – Oliana (ESP) – December 17, 2011 – First ascent by Chris Sharma, 2009
- Papichulo – Oliana (ESP) – December 24, 2010 – First ascent by Chris Sharma, 2008

9a (5.14d):

- Era Vella – Margalef (ESP) – December 2, 2012
- Kinematix – Gorges du Loup (FRA) – August 2009 – First ascent by Andreas Bindhammer, 2001

== See also ==
- List of grade milestones in rock climbing
- History of rock climbing
- Rankings of most career IFSC gold medals
