= Stefano Ghisolfi =

Italian rock climber (born 1993)

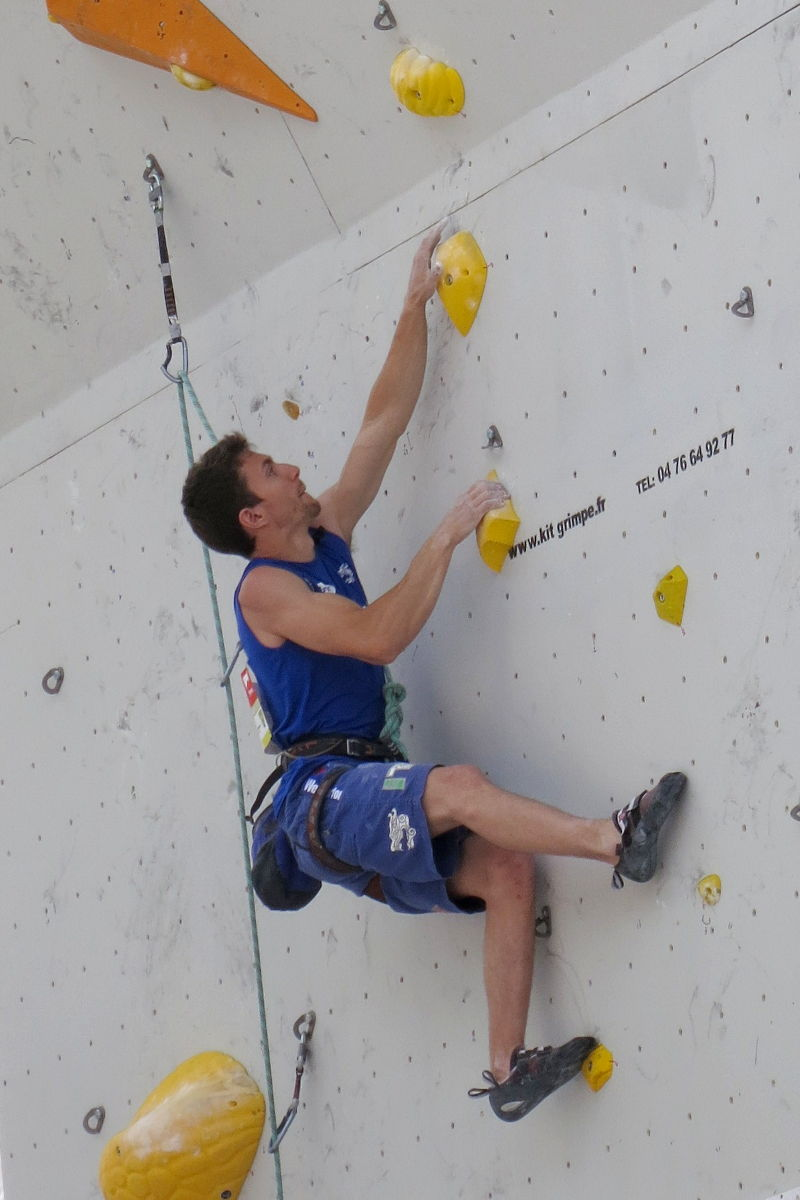
- Ghisolfi competing at the European Championships, Chamonix, 2013.

Personal information
- Born: February 18, 1993 (age 33) Turin, Italy
- Occupation: Professional rock climber
- Height: 170 cm (5 ft 7 in)
- Weight: 58 kg (128 lb)

Climbing career
- Type of climber: Competition climbing; Sport climbing; Bouldering
- Ape index: +4 cm (2 in)
- Highest grade: Redpoint: 9b+ (5.15c); Onsight/Flash: 8c (5.14b); Bouldering: 8C+ (V16)
- First ascents: Excalibur (2023, 9b+); Erebor (2021, 9b)
- Known for: Fourth climber in history to redpoint a 9b+ (5.15c) route
Medal record
Men's competition climbing
Representing Italy
World Cup
Second place	2017	Lead
Second place	2018	Lead
First place	2021	Lead
- Updated on December 7, 2018

Stefano Ghisolfi (born February 18, 1993) is an Italian professional rock climber, who specializes in competition climbing, sport climbing, and bouldering. In competition climbing, he competes in competition lead climbing, competition bouldering, and competition speed climbing, with lead being his strongest discipline. As a sport climber, he has redpointed sport climbing routes of grade 9b+ (5.15c), onsighted routes of 8c (5.14b), and solved boulder problems at grade 8C+ (V16). In December 2018, after climbing Perfecto Mundo, he became the fourth climber in history to redpoint a 9b+ (5.15c) route.

== Climbing career ==
=== Competition climbing ===
In 2007, Ghisolfi participated in his first international competition: the IFSC European Youth Cup.

Both in 2010 and 2011, he won the bronze medal in Lead climbing at the IFSC World Youth Championships. In the same years, he also participated in the IFSC World Championships as a senior competitor, for all disciplines (lead, bouldering, and speed) and placed tenth in the overall ranking.

On October 13, 2012, he first got on the podium in the World Cup, obtaining a bronze medal in Xining, China. He obtained gold medals in the World Cup stages at Wujiang (China), in 2014, Xiamen (China), in 2016, and then again at Wujiang (China), in 2017.

=== Rock climbing ===
On November 2, 2015, he made the first free ascent (FFA) of Lapsus, in Andonno (Italy), a 70-hold sport climbing route for which he proposed a grade of 9b (5.15b).

On December 7, 2018, after climbing the 9b+ (5.15c) sport route Perfecto Mundo (Margalef, Spain), he became the fourth climber in history to redpoint a route at that grade, after Adam Ondra, Chris Sharma, and Alex Megos.

On September 2, 2020, he made the second ascent of Change 9b+ (5.15c), in Flatanger Municipality, Norway; the first-ever 9b+ route in history, established by Adam Ondra in 2012.

On August 24, 2021, he made the second ascent of Bibliographie 9b+ (5.15c), in Céüse, France. Originally graded with a proposed 9c (5.15d) rating, the route was first established by Alex Megos. Ghisolfi then downgraded it to 9b+.

On February 2, 2023, made the FA of Excalibur, in Arco, in Italy, for which he proposed a grade of 9b+ (5.15c).

== Rankings ==
=== Climbing World Cup ===
Discipline	2009	2010	2011	2012	2013	2014	2015	2016	2017	2018	2019	2021
Lead		21	24	10	10	9	9	4	2	2	5	1
Bouldering		65	83			30					41	
Speed	17	30	38									
Combined		10	10			4			9			

=== Climbing World Championships ===
Youth

Discipline	2008 Youth B	2009 Youth A	2010 Youth A	2011 Juniors	2012 Juniors
Lead	5	15	3	3	13
Speed	5	6	5	-	17

Adult

Discipline	2011	2012	2014	2016	2018
Lead	27	16	10	7	22
Bouldering	25	16			
Speed	30	33			

=== Climbing European Championships ===
Youth

Discipline	2012 Juniors
Lead	3

Adult

Discipline	2010	2013	2015	2017
Lead	37	16	7	10
Bouldering	37	35	35	-
Speed	18	32	26	-

== Number of medals in the Climbing World Cup ==
=== Lead ===
Season	Gold	Silver	Bronze	Total
2012			1	1
2013				0
2014	1			1
2015				0
2016	1	1		2
2017	1	1	1	3
2018	2	2		4
2019			1	1
2020				0
2021	1	2		3
Total	6	6	3	15

== Number of medals in the Climbing European Youth Cup ==
=== Lead ===
Season	Category	Gold	Silver	Bronze	Total
2011	Juniors	1		3	4
2012	Juniors		1		1
Total		1	1	3	5

=== Speed ===
Season	Category	Gold	Silver	Bronze	Total
2011	Juniors			2	2
Total		0	0	2	2

== Rock climbing ==
=== Redpointed routes ===
9b+ (5.15c):

- Perfecto Mundo - Margalef (ESP) - December 7, 2018 - First repeat, first ascent was by Alex Megos, 2018
- Change - Flatanger (NOR) - September 29, 2020 - First repeat, first ascent was by Adam Ondra, 2012
- Bibliographie - Céüse (FRA) - August 24, 2021 - First repeat, first ascent was by Alex Megos, 2020. Originally 9c, Ghisolfi proposed 9b+ instead.
- Excalibur - Arco (ITA) - February 5, 2023 - First ascent.

9b (5.15b):

- Move Hard - Flatanger (NOR) - September 16, 2022 - First ascent by Adam Ondra, 2017
- L'Arenauta - Sperlonga (ITA) - February 10, 2022 - First ascent.
- The Lonely Mountain - Arco (ITA) - December 17, 2021 - First Ascent.
- Erebor - Arco (ITA) - January 11, 2021 - First Ascent. Originally graded 9b/+, downgraded by Adam Ondra.
- La Capella - Siurana (ESP) - January 12, 2018 - First ascent by Adam Ondra, 2011
- One Slap - Arco (ITA) - November 22, 2017 - First ascent by Adam Ondra, 2017
- First Round, First Minute - Margalef (ESP) - January 30, 2017
- Lapsus - Andonno (ITA) - November 2, 2015 - First ascent

9a+ (5.15a):

- La Rambla - Siurana (ESP) - March 20, 2017
- First Ley - Margalef (ESP) - January 2017
- Ultimatum - Massone (Arco, (ITA)) - December 19, 2016
- Jungle Boogie - Céüse (FRA) - October 2, 2016
- Realization - Céüse (FRA) - June 21, 2015 - First ascent by Chris Sharma, 2001
- Demencia senil - Margalef (ESP) - March 14, 2015 - First ascent by Chris Sharma, 2009
- La moustache qui fàche - Entraygues (FRA) - August 23, 2014

9a (5.14d):

- Thunder Ribes - Massone (Arco, (ITA)) - December 16, 2016 - Combination of the routes Reini's Vibes, Ultima Pietra, and Stonehenge.
- L'Attimo - Covolo (ITA) - October 11, 2015 - First ascent by Silvio Reffo, 2012
- Underground - Massone (Arco, (ITA)) - July 5, 2014 - First ascent by Manfred Stuffer, 1998
- Biologico - Narango (Arco, (ITA)) - June 8, 2014 - First ascent by Adam Ondra, 2012
- TCT - Gravere (ITA) - May 31, 2014 - First ascent
- Grandi Gesti - Grotta dell'Arenauta (Sperlonga, ITA) - December 30, 2013 - First ascent by Gianluca Daniele, 2009
- Ground Zero - Tetto di Sarre (ITA) - June 9, 2013 - First ascent by Alberto Gnerro, 2002

=== Onsighted routes ===
8c (5.14b):

- Fish Eye - Oliana (ESP) - January 8, 2017

8b+ (5.14a):

- Falconeti - Montsant (ESP) - January 2013
- L-mens - Montsant (ESP) - January 2013

=== Boulder problems ===
8C+ (V16):

- Giola - Varazze (ITA) - February 2026

8C (V15):

- 4-Low - Val Bavona (SUI) - March 2026
- The Story of Two Worlds - Cresciano (SUI) - March 2026
- Dreamtime - Cresciano (SUI) - March 2026
- Flow State - Val Daone (ITA) - September 2025
- Adularia - Gotthard Pass (SUI) - August 2025
- Anam cara low - Silvretta Alps (AUT) - June 2025
- Hazel Grace sit - Gotthard Pass(SUI) - August 2025

He won the 2013, 2014, 2015 and 2016 editions of Melloblocco.

== See also ==
- List of grade milestones in rock climbing
- History of rock climbing
- Rankings of most career IFSC gold medals
