= Alexander Megos =

German rock climber

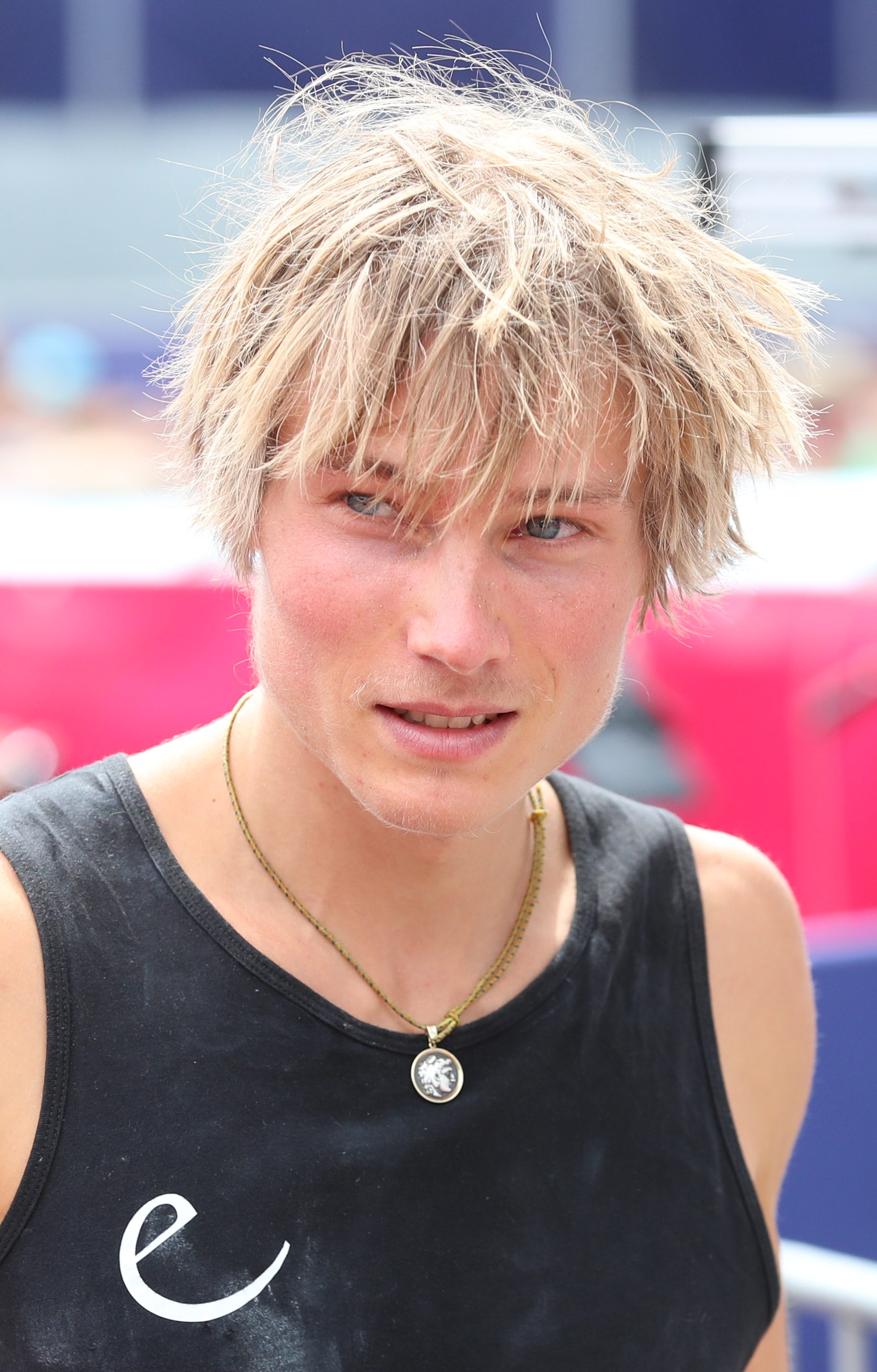
- Megos at the 2022 European Championships

Personal information
- Nationality: German
- Born: 12 August 1993 (age 33) Erlangen, Germany
- Occupation: Professional rock climber
- Height: 170 cm (5 ft 7 in)
- Weight: 57 kg (126 lb)

Climbing career
- Type of climber: Competition climbing; Sport climbing; Bouldering
- Highest grade: Redpoint: 9b+ (5.15c); Onsight/Flash: 9a (5.14d); Bouldering: 8C (V15)
- First ascents: Fight Club (9b, 2016); Perfecto Mundo (9b+, 2018); Bibliographie (9b+, 2020); Ratstaman Vibrations (9b, 2022); The Full Journey (9b, 2022)
- Known for: First-ever person to onsight a 9a (5.14d); Third-ever person to climb 9b+ (5.15c)
Medal record
Men's competition climbing
Representing Germany
World Championships
Silver medal – second place	2019 Hachiōji	Lead
Bronze medal – third place	2018 Innsbruck	Lead
Bronze medal – third place	2023 Bern	Lead
World Cup
Gold medal – first place	Briancon 2018	Lead
Silver medal – second place	Innsbruck 2024	Lead
Silver medal – second place	Innsbruck 2023	Lead
Silver medal – second place	Villars 2021	Lead
Silver medal – second place	Chamonix 2019	Lead
Silver medal – second place	Kranj 2017	Lead
Bronze medal – third place	Villars 2023	Lead
Bronze medal – third place	Briancon 2022	Lead
Bronze medal – third place	Villars 2019	Lead
Bronze medal – third place	Chamonix 2018	Lead
- Updated on 27 June 2024

Alexander "Alex" Megos (born 12 August 1993) is a German rock climber specializing in sport climbing, bouldering and competition climbing. In 2013, he became the first-ever climber to onsight a 9a (5.14d) graded route. He has made the first free ascent (FFA) of some of the hardest sport climbing routes in the world, including two 9b+ (5.15c) routes (Perfecto Mundo and Bibliographie), five 9b (5.15b) routes (including Fight Club, Ratstaman Vibrations, and The Full Journey), and two boulders with a boulder 8C (V15) rating.

== Early life ==
Alexander Megos was born on 12 August 1993 in Erlangen, Germany. His family is partly of Greek descent. Megos speaks rudimentary Greek and often visits Greece.

Megos started climbing at the age of six. With his father, he climbed multi-pitch routes up to 300 m at the age of ten. In 2006, Megos began training in the mountainous region of his native Bavaria, known as Franconian Switzerland, and later at the German Alpine Club's national climbing center in Erlangen-Nuremberg. There, he was mentored by Patrick Matros and Ludwig Korb, who continue to train and coach Megos to this day. In 2007, Megos completed his first 8a (5.13b). Two years later, in 2009, he climbed his first 8c (5.14b) by completing Drive-by Shooting, and, in 2011, his first 9a (5.14d) by ascending San Ku Kai.

== Climbing career ==
=== Competition climbing ===
Megos started competition climbing in 2006. He won two youth European Championship titles (2009 and 2010) and was the runner-up in the youth World Championships in 2011. In 2009, he won every single competition in the EYC series. In 2017, he was the runner-up in bouldering at the European Championship and won his first World Cup in the lead climbing discipline in Briançon, France, on 21 July 2018.

In 2017, he won the silver medal for bouldering at both the European Championships in Munich and the IFSC Lead World Cup in Kranj, Slovenia. In 2018, he won a bronze medal in the lead climbing discipline at the IFSC World Cup in Chamonix, France, and, one week later, won the gold medal at the Briancon World Cup. Later in that year, he took the bronze medal at the World Championships in the lead competition. He followed this up with a silver in lead at the 2019 World Championships. By reaching the finals of the combined event at the World Championships, he secured a qualifying spot for Tokyo's 2020 Summer Olympics.

Megos has also climbed in the La Sportiva Legends competitions, where he has placed second and third on numerous occasions, celebrating in a win in 2018. He currently holds the high point of Black Diamond's The Project, which is widely considered one of the world's hardest indoor routes.

=== Sport climbing ===
On 24 March 2013, Megos ascended Estado Critico in Siurana, Spain, completing the world's first 9a onsight. In August 2013, Megos climbed The Red Project 9a (35), Australia's first 9a, and Wheelchair (9a+). Due to the boulder's uncommonly long length, Megos assigned the Wheelchair a sport grading.

Alexander Megos is known for speedily ascending difficult climbing routes. From mid-April to mid-June 2014, he completed nine routes, ranging from 9a+ (5.15a) to 8c+ (5.14c), in Franconian Switzerland, including Modified 9a+ (5.15a), one of the most challenging routes in the region. He also managed a redpoint attempt of the famous Action Directe within two hours, setting a record time. In addition, he is the only person to complete an asccent of Biography also known as Realization 9a+ (5.15a) in Ceüse, France in a single day of effort.

In June 2014, Alexander Megos, together with Roger Schäli, completed the first ascent of the 20-pitch route Fly 8c (5.14b) in Staldeflue, Switzerland, one of the most difficult big-wall climbing routes in the world.

In April 2015, Megos returned to Australia, completing the first ascent of SchweinebaumeIn 9a (35). On 1 October 2015, he climbed the route Supernova in Franconian Switzerland and, by doing so, likely established the first route of grade 11+ (UIAA) (9a + / 9b French) in German-speaking countries.

Megos' ascent of First Round First Minute in December 2015 marked the completion of his first 9b (5.15b).

On 9 May 2018, he secured the first ascent of the route Perfecto Mundo in Margalef, Spain, a line bolted by Chris Sharma. Megos and Sharma had tried it together several times in the days before his ascent and graded it 9b+ (5.15c).

In August 2020, Megos completed his long-term project Bibliographie in Céüse, grading it 9c (5.15d), after working on it for 60 days. However, in August 2021, after Stefano Ghisolfi had matched this feat, the route was downgraded to 9b+ (5.15c), which Megos agreed was more fitting.

Same 2020 Megos established Pornographie, a new route between Bibliographie and L’Étrange Ivress. He graded it 9a (5.14d) without using knee-pads.

=== Bouldering ===
In May 2020, Megos ascended Upgrade U 8C (V15), one of the most challenging bouldering problems in his native northern Bavaria.

== Notable ascents ==
=== Redpointed routes ===
9b+ (5.15c)

- Bibliographie (5 August 2020). First Ascent (after 60 days of effort). Route bolted by Ethan Pringle. Originally graded 9c by Megos, downgraded by Stefano Ghisolfi to 9b+.
- Perfecto Mundo (9 May 2018). First Ascent. Route bolted by Chris Sharma.
- Change (21 August 2024). Fourth Ascent (after 5 days of effort). First Ascent by Adam Ondra.

9b (5.15b)

- First Round, First Minute (31 December 2015). Third Ascent. First Ascent by Chris Sharma.
- Fight Club (14 August 2016). First Ascent. Route bolted by Sonnie Trotter.
- Clash of the Titans (17 June 2017). First Ascent. Originally graded 9a+ by Megos, later upgraded to 9b by Jakob Schubert and confirmed by Pepa Šindel.
- Mejorando Imagen (25 April 2021). Second Ascent. First Ascent by Ramón Julián. Originally graded 9a, upgraded by Megos to 9b.
- King Capella (November 2021). Second Ascent (after 9 days of effort). First Ascent by Will Bosi.
- Ratstaman Vibrations (31 July 2022). First Ascent. Route bolted by Chris Sharma.
- The Full Journey (9 October 2022). First Ascent. Route bolted by Tom Bolger.
- Sleeping Lion (4 January 2024). Second Ascent (after 8 days of effort). First Ascent by Chris Sharma. Originally graded 9b+ by Sharma, downgraded by Megos to 9b.
- Move (3 September 2024). Third Ascent. First Ascent by Adam Ondra. Graded 9b/+ by Megos.
- Tuareg Blanco (14 January 2025). First Ascent. Route bolted by Adrien Boulon.
- Le Bruit de l’Acid (March 2026). Second Ascent. First Ascent by Jules Marchaland.

9a+/b (5.15a/b)

- Chan Chan Bastards
- Supernova - First Ascent.
- La Capella

9a+ (5.15a)

- Demencia Senil - First Ascent by Chris Sharma.
- La Rambla - Megos climbed it on his second try.
- Biographie - First Ascent by Chris Sharma. Megos climbed it in one day, on his third try.
- Corona - Third Ascent.
- Classified - First Ascent.
- Modified - First Ascent.
- First Ley - Megos also sent a variation called La Ley Indignata 9a (5.14d), possible first ascent.
- Thor's Hammer - First Repeat. First Ascent by Adam Ondra.
- Geocache - First Ascent. Repeated by Adam Ondra.
- Becoming - First Ascent.
- Super Crackinette - First Ascent.
- Jaws 2 - Sent on third try.
- Le Grand Saccage - First Ascent.
- Iron Curtain - Third Ascent.
- Kangaroo's Limb - First Ascent by Adam Ondra.
- Beginning - First Ascent by Stefano Ghisolfi.

9a (5.14d)

- Action Directe - Megos sent this route in just two hours. Action Directe was the world's first 9a, and continues to be a benchmark for the grade.
- La Sensación del Bloque - March 2017 - FA of the first South American 9a in Valle de los Condores, Chile.
- Dreamcatcher - Fourth Ascent. Climbed in one day, other previous ascents by Chris Sharma, Sean McColl and Ben Harnden took multiple days.
- Era Vella - Second Try. Subject to much controversy about whether it is 9a(14d) or 8c+(14c).
- Speed Intégrale - Voralpsee, Switzerland in two days, 2017
- Coup de grâce - Val Bavona, Switzerland second go, 2017
- The Illusionist - Third Ascent. Climbed on the same day as Move (9b/+).
- Mr Big - Flash.

Other notable ascents

- Pure Imagination: 8c+ (5.14c). Flash.
- Fly: 8c (5.14b). Megos made the first free ascent of this twenty pitch big wall in Switzerland.
- Hubble: 8c+ (5.14c) - Megos became the first to climb both Action Directe and Hubble by sending Hubble in June 2016.

=== Onsighted routes ===
9a (5.14d)

- Estado Critico - World's first 9a onsight.
- TCT

8c+ (5.14c)

- Victimes del Passat

=== Boulder problems ===
8C / 8C+

- Wheelchair - First Ascent. Although Megos suggested a 9a+ sport climbing grade because of its length, this Wheel of Life variation is not a sport climb. It is a long boulder problem, harder than Wheel of Life, and possibly worth an 8C+ (V16) rating.

8C (V15)

- The Story of Two Worlds - First Ascended by Dave Graham in 2005, repeated by Megos in December 2020.
- Dreamtime - Ascended by Megos on 18 December 2020.
- Upgrade U - First Ascent May 2020, rated 8C and accepted as the hardest boulder problem in the Frankenjura.
- Half Life - Second ascent April 2020, Frankenjura, Megos confirmed as 8C
- The Finnish Line - Summer 2017 - Second ascent of hard testpiece established by Nalle Hukkataival in Rocklands, South Africa. The grade is still controversial, but consensus seems to grow on 8C (V15).
- Wheel of Life: - First Ascent by Dai Koyamada. Megos suggested a sport climbing grade of 9a (5.14d), but this is not a sport climb. It is a long boulder problem, rated 8C.
- Lucid Dreaming - Third Ascent of Paul Robinson's boulder, originally graded 8C+ (V16).

8B+ (V14)

- Never Ending Story
- Bad Boys for Life - First Ascent.
- Montecore
- Riot Act
- Double Demerit - First Repeat.
- Sky
- Trainspotting - First Ascent.

== Rankings ==
=== Climbing World Cup ===
Discipline	2009	2010	2011	2012	2013	2014	2015	2016	2017	2018	2019	2021	2022	2023	2024
Lead	55	37	35	-	-	-	-	-	22	6	7	10	14	2	22
Bouldering	-	-	-	73	-	-	-	-	28	55	19	9	22	33	-
Speed	-	-	-	-	-	-	-	-	-	-	-	-	-	-	-
Combined	-	-	-	-	-	-	-	-	38						

=== Climbing World Championships ===
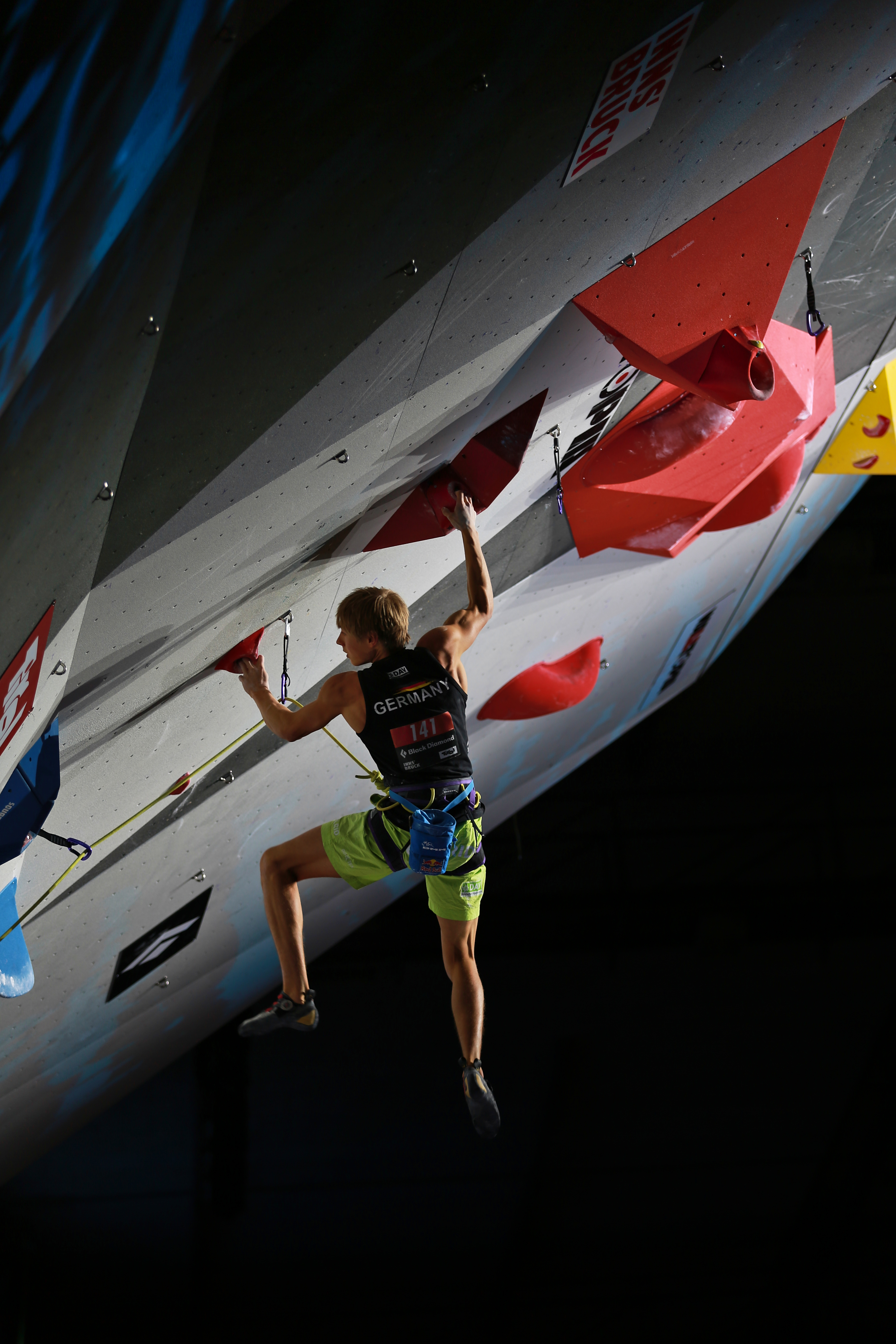
Megos in the 2018 World Championships lead finals

Youth

Discipline	2009 Youth A	2010 Youth A
Lead	8	2

Adult

Discipline	2018	2019	2023
Lead	3	2	3
Bouldering	25	25	17
Speed	109	75	-
Combined	11		13

=== Climbing European Championships ===
Discipline	2010	2017
Lead	23	-
Bouldering	-	2
Speed	-	-

== Number of medals in the Climbing World Cup ==
=== Lead ===
Season	Gold	Silver	Bronze	Total
2017		1		1
2018	1		1	2
2019		1	1	2
2021		1		1
2022			1	1
2023		1	1	2
2024		1		1
Total	1	5	4	10

== Personal life ==
Megos has been vegan since the beginning of 2021.

Megos and his family have provided housing, via their properties in Erlangen, to Ukrainian refugees, saying the refugees are "friends and family". He said that athletes feel too far from the Ukrainian War to believe they can be of any help, and wishes that they would use their platform to help people.

== See also ==
- List of grade milestones in rock climbing
- History of rock climbing
- Rankings of most career IFSC gold medals
