= Sport climbing at the 2009 World Games – Men's lead =

Sport climbing - Men's lead at the 2009 World Games
- Venue: Shoushan Junior High School, Kaohsiung, Taiwan
- Dates: 19 July 2009
- Competitors: 10 from 8 nations

Medalists
gold medal	(Japan) Sachi Amma
silver medal	(Spain) Patxi Usobiaga
bronze medal	(France) Romain Desgranges

The men's lead competition in sport climbing at the 2009 World Games took place on 19 July at the Shoushan Junior High School in Kaohsiung, Taiwan.

== Competition format ==
A total of 10 athletes entered the competition. Best eight athletes from preliminary advances to the semifinal. Best five athletes from this stage advances to the final.

== Results ==
=== Preliminary round ===
Rank	Athlete	Nation	Result	Note
1	Sachi Amma	Japan	Top	Q
1	Jakob Schubert	Austria	Top	Q
1	Ramón Julián Puigblanqué	Spain	Top	Q
1	Romain Desgranges	France	Top	Q
1	Patxi Usobiaga	Spain	Top	Q
6	Min Hyun-bin	South Korea	35+	Q
7	Chang Yeu-shiang	Chinese Taipei	29	Q
8	Mauricio Huerta	Mexico	23–	Q
9	Jou Chun-ming	Chinese Taipei	20	
10	Robert Lebreton	Australia	19–	

=== Semifinal ===
Rank	Athlete	Nation	Result	Note
1	Sachi Amma	Japan	Top	Q
1	Jakob Schubert	Austria	Top	Q
1	Ramón Julián Puigblanqué	Spain	Top	Q
1	Romain Desgranges	France	Top	Q
1	Patxi Usobiaga	Spain	Top	Q
6	Min Hyun-bin	South Korea	43–	
7	Mauricio Huerta	Mexico	35+	
8	Chang Yeu-shiang	Chinese Taipei	27	

=== Final ===
Rank	Athlete	Nation	Result
1st place, gold medalist(s)	Sachi Amma	Japan	38
2nd place, silver medalist(s)	Patxi Usobiaga	Spain	29–
3rd place, bronze medalist(s)	Romain Desgranges	France	22.2–
4	Jakob Schubert	Austria	22.1–
5	Ramón Julián Puigblanqué	Spain	12–
