= Prawn (disambiguation) =

Prawns may refer to either of two groups of crustaceans:

- Dendrobranchiata, including genera such as Penaeus, Sergestes and Acetes
- More generally, it may be used for shrimp and prawns

Prawn may also refer to:

- Prawn, an extraterrestrial race in the film District 9
- Prawn (band), American indie rock band
- King Prawn (band), a UK ska band
- Parktown prawn, Libanasidus vittatus, a species of cricket

== See also ==
- Pawn (disambiguation)
- Shrimp (disambiguation)
