= Pawn =

Pawn most often refers to:

- Pawn (chess), the weakest and most numerous chess piece in the game
- Pawnbroker or pawnshop, a business that provides loans by taking personal property as collateral

Pawn or The Pawn may also refer to:

== Places ==
- Pawn, Oregon, an historic forest community
- Pawn River, Burma
- Noatak Airport, International Civil Aviation Organization code PAWN

== Arts, entertainment, and media ==
- Pawn (2013 film), an American film
- The Pawn (film), a 1978 French film
- Pawn (2020 film), a South Korean film
- The Pawn (video game), 1985 interactive fiction game
- "Pawns", a song on the 2017 Paloma Faith album The Architect

== Other uses ==
- Pawnship, debt bondage slavery
- Pawn, another name for a pledge in certain jurisdictions
- Pawn, a token or game piece in board and video games

== People with the surname ==
- Doris Pawn (1894–1988), an American actress of the silent film era

== See also ==
- Pawn Stars (disambiguation)
- Porn (disambiguation)
- Prawn (disambiguation)
