= Boone Speed =

American photographer and rock climber (born 1965)

Personal information
- Nationality: American
- Born: August 29, 1965 (age 60) Provo, Utah, U.S.
- Occupation: Photographer / climber
- Height: 6 ft 1 in (185 cm)
- Weight: 150 lb (68 kg)

Climbing career
- Highest grade: Onsight/Flash: 5.13b (8a); Bouldering: V12 (8A+)

Boone Speed (born August 29, 1965) is an American photographer and rock climber. The only son of Western sculptor Ulysess Grant Speed (January 6, 1930 – October 1, 2011), Boone was raised outside of Provo, Utah, and studied Graphic Design at Brigham Young University.

== Climbing career ==
Boone began climbing in the summer of 1985 near Salt Lake City, Utah. By the spring of 1987 Boone had climbed the most challenging routes in the region, and began traveling to explore new crags in other undeveloped areas, including the sandstone of Red Rocks, outside of Las Vegas, Nevada, American Fork Canyon, Virgin River Gorge and Logan Canyon, Utah, where Boone became the first American to climb the grade of 5.14b with his first ascent of "Super Tweak" in 1994.

Boone has been on the cover of Climbing Magazine twice and has had published writing and photography in climbing, lifestyle and travel magazines worldwide.

== Timeline ==
- 1988 Began developing American Fork's Hell Cave is home to many 1990's era test pieces including Speed's Power Junkie (5.14a) and his hardest route, "Ice Cream" (5.14c)
- 1989 began to develop the Virgin River Gorge, where Boone established the demanding classics "Fall Of Man" 5.13b (1990) and "Route of all Evil" 5.14a (1994)
- In August 1991, Boone was Climbing Magazine's cover feature and American Fork Canyon Climbing was its cover story, establishing Salt Lake City as a destination climbing area as well as an influence on the "limestone revolution" in America
- 1990 Boone was featured in the video "Masters Of Stone" on Dead Souls (5.13d) and Burning (5.13b) in American Fork's "Hell Cave"
- 1990 began to develop Logan Canyon, where Boone became the first American to successfully establish a consensus 5.14b route, "Super Tweak" in 1994
- 1991 began employment as designer at Black Diamond Equipment
- 1994 First ascent of Super Tweak featured in the video "Masters Of Stone 3"
- 1995 Discovered Joe's Valley for bouldering (on tip from Conrad Anker) and established first problems there
- 1995 Original partner of innovative climbing company Pusher where Boone became an influential handhold and training board shaper
- 1996 Pictured on cover of Climbing magazine (for second time) and feature article entitled "Boone Speed Tells All"
- 1997 met Chris Sharma at base of "Necessary Evil" and established ongoing friendship
- 1997 climbed first ascent of "Ice Cream" 5.14c becoming one of the first 10 climbers in the world to climb the grade
- 1997–1999 Employed by Fila as a climbing shoe designer and climbing market authenticator
- 1999–2001 Employed as creative director and photographer for Pusher
- 2001–2007 worked as freelance designer and photographer for Bluewater Ropes and Entre Prises Climbing Walls
- 2005 Featured Photographer at Taos Mountain Film Festival
- 2009 Photography show at Nau popup in New York
- 2011 PDN's "The Shot" Grand Prize winner
- 2013 Photographed Chris Sharma and Daila Ojeda for ESPN The Magazine "The Body Issue"
- 2014 Represented America as climbing Legend at The North Face's Kalymnos Climbing Festival
- 2015 "Frightening Nature" film accepted into Cannes Short Film Corner (Director of Photography)

== Filmography ==
- "Masters of Stone" (1990)
- "Masters of Stone 3" (1994)
- "Yank on This" (1995)
- "Three Weeks and a Day" (1996)
- "Best Forgotten Art" (1996)
- "Fast Twitch" (1997)
- "Movement" (1998)
- "Free Hueco" (1998)
- "Frequent Flyers" (2001)
- "Best of the West" (2004)
- "Big Game" (2004)
- "King Lines" (2007)
- "Perfecto" (2007)
- "Heraklia" (2008)
- "Running From Crazy" (2012)
- "Project American Fork" (2013)
