= Pornography (disambiguation) =

Pornography is the representation of the human body form or human sexual behavior with the goal of sexual arousal.

Pornography may also be:

== Books ==
- Pornografia, a 1960 novel by Witold Gombrowicz
- Pornography: Men Possessing Women, a 1981 book by Andrea Dworkin
- Pornography, a play by Simon Stephens about the 7/7 train bombings

== Film and television ==
- Pornografia, a 2003 adaptation of Gombrowicz's novel
- Pornographic film
- "Pornography", an episode of the British sitcom Men Behaving Badly

== Music ==
- Pornography (band), an American musical group
- Pornography (album), a 1982 album by the Cure

== Sport ==
- Pornographie, is a sport climbing route (9a (5.14d)) on the southern face of Céüse mountain, France, established by Alex Megos in 2020.

== See also ==
- Pornography in the United States
- Pawnography
- Porn (disambiguation)
