= Ramón Julián =

Spanish rock climber (born 1981)

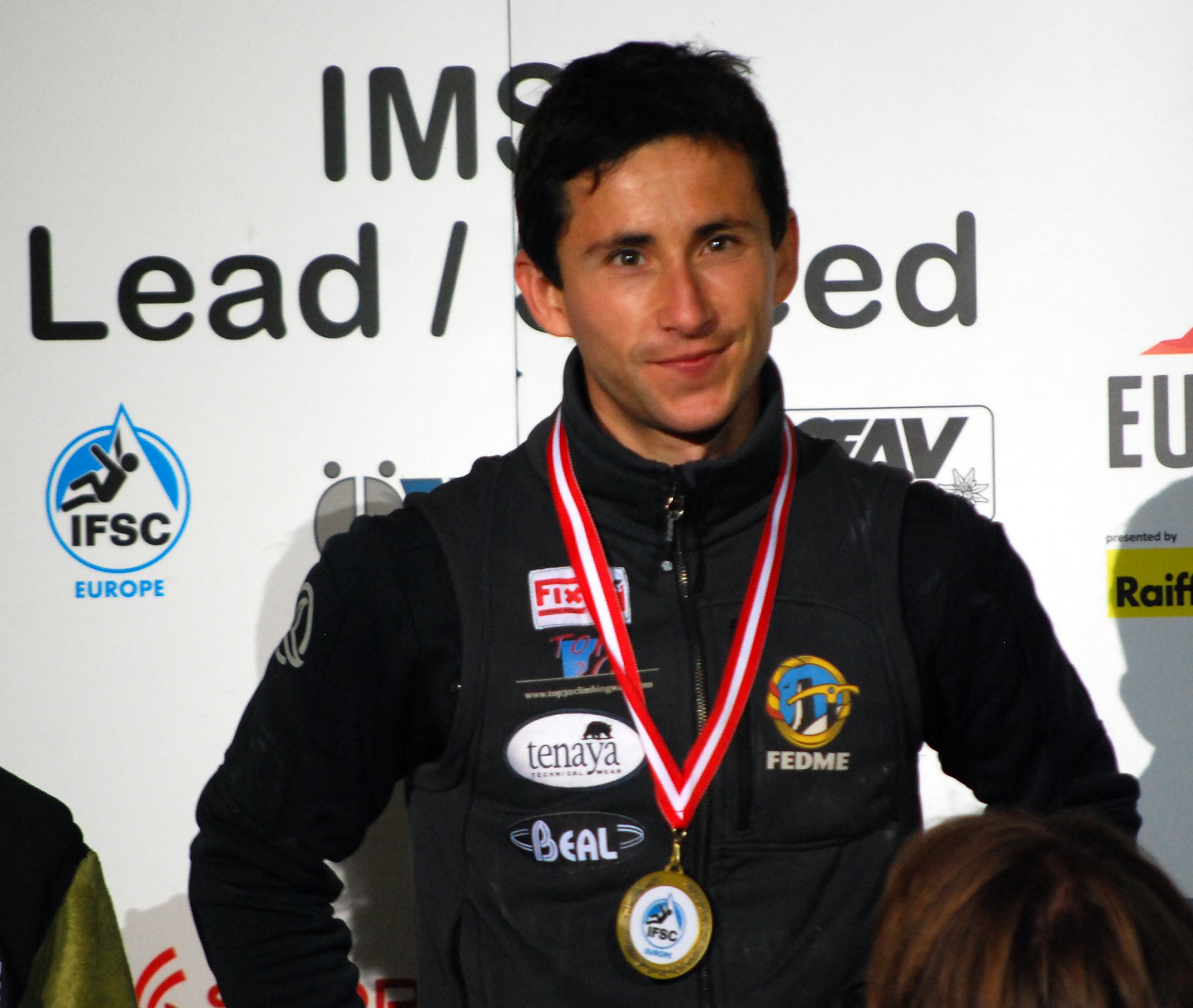
- Julián competing at Imst, 2010

Personal information
- Nationality: Spanish
- Born: Ramón Julián Puigblanque; November 9, 1981 (age 44) Vic (Barcelona, Spain)
- Height: 159 cm (5 ft 3 in)
- Weight: 48 kg (106 lb)

Climbing career
- Type of climber: Competition climbing; Sport climbing
- Highest grade: Redpoint: 9b (5.15b); Onsight/Flash: 8c+ (5.14c)
- Known for: Winning 2 World Championships and 21 World Cup stages
Medal record
Men's competition climbing
Representing Spain
World Games
Gold medal – first place	2013	Lead
World Championships
Gold medal – first place	2007 Avilés	Lead
Gold medal – first place	2011 Arco	Lead
Silver medal – second place	2014 Gijón	Lead
World Cup
Winner	2010	Lead
European Championships
Bronze medal – third place	2002	Lead
Gold medal – first place	2004	Lead
Gold medal – first place	2010	Lead
Silver medal – second place	2013	Lead
Gold medal – first place	2015	Lead
- Updated on November 13, 2017

Ramón Julián Puigblanque (also known as Ramonet, which means little Ramon in Catalan language; born November 9, 1981, in Vic) is a professional Spanish rock climber specializing in competition lead climbing and sport climbing. He won two World Championships, in 2007 and 2011, three European Championships, in 2004 2010 and 2015, and one Lead Climbing World Cup in 2010. From 2001 to 2016, he participated in 16 seasons of the World Cup, winning 21 World Cup stages. He has also redpointed several sport routes above 9a (5.14d), and made the first free ascent of La Rambla.

== Climbing career ==
=== Competition climbing ===
He started climbing when he was a child with his parents and competed in senior categories from 2001. On November 17, 2002, he took his first victory and first podium in the Lead World Cup, in Kranj, which was the last stage of the 2002 season.

In 2004, he won the gold medal at the European Championships in Lecco, Italy.

In 2007, he took his first gold medal at the World Championships in Avilés, Spain, and ended the Lead World Cup in second place.

In 2010, he won his first Lead World Cup title, with three wins and a second place and took his second gold medal at the European Championships in Imst, Austria.

In 2011, he won his second gold medal at the World Championships in Arco, Italy and ended the Lead World Cup in second place.

=== Rock climbing ===
On March 8, 2003, he came to wider attention with the first free ascent of La Rambla, in Siurana, one of the first 9a+ (5.15a) sport climbing routes in history, and the highest grade at that time. In the same year he ended the Lead World Cup in second place with three wins, two seconds and two podiums finishes. The Cup was won by Alexandre Chabot, with five wins and two seconds.

On May 29, 2006, he succeeded in onsighting the 8c (5.14b) sport route Suma O in Cuenca, Spain. Puigblanque became the fourth person ever to onsight at grade 8c after Yuji Hirayama, Tomáš Mrázek and Patxi Usobiaga.

On October 11, 2011, he became the third person ever to onsight a sport climbing route at grade 8c+ (5.14c), after Patxi Usobiaga and Adam Ondra, with the onsight of The Crew in Rifle, Colorado.

== Rankings ==
=== Climbing World Cup ===
Discipline	2001	2002	2003	2004	2005	2006	2007	2008	2009	2010	2011	2012	2013	2014	2015	2016	2017
Lead	8	10	2	10	4	5	2	3	5	1	2	2	3	6	6	16	30

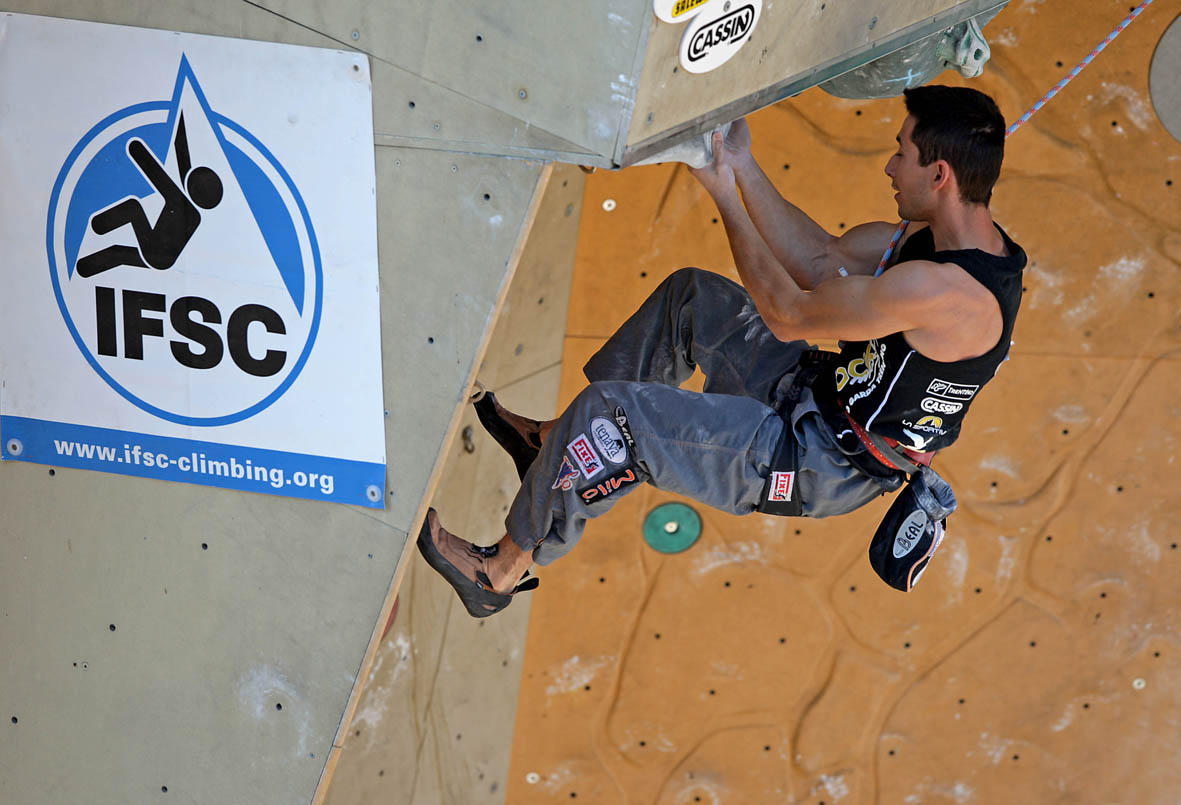
Julián competing at 2007 Rock Master

=== Climbing World Championships ===
Youth

Discipline	2000 Juniors
Lead	13

Adult

Discipline	2001	2003	2005	2007	2009	2011	2012	2014	2016
Lead	6	7	10	1	16	1	4	2	9

=== Climbing European Championships ===
Discipline	2002	2004	2006	2008	2010	2013	2015	2017
Lead	3	1	30	5	1	2	1	55

== Number of medals in the Climbing World Cup ==
=== Lead ===
Season	Gold	Silver	Bronze	Total
2002	1			1
2003	3	2	2	7
2004				0
2005	2	1	1	4
2006	2		1	3
2007	1	3		4
2008	1	1		2
2009		1		1
2010	3	1		4
2011	2	3	2	7
2012	3	1		4
2013	2		1	3
2014		1		1
2015	1		1	2
Total	21	14	8	43

== Notable ascents ==
The table below shows the impressively large number of routes graded 8a (5.13b) or more ascended by Puigblanque in about 16 years, from August 10, 2001 (when he redpointed his first 8a) to November 27, 2017. The total number is 1123, of which 13 were at 9a+ (5.15a) and 345 were onsights, including 1 onsight at 8c+ (5.14c).

Number of ascended routes
Grade	Redpoint	Flash	On-sight	Total
9a+ (5.15a)	13			13
9a (5.14d)	36			36
8c+ (5.14c)	85		1	86
8c/8c+	4			4
8c (5.14b)	134	2	6	142
8b+ (5.14a)	152	2	22	176
8b (5.13d)	134	2	55	191
8a+ (5.13c)	100	2	92	194
8a (5.13b)	105	7	169	281
Total	763	15	345	1123

=== Redpointed routes ===
9b (5.15b):

- Mejorando Imagen - Margalef (ESP) - July 26, 2013 - First ascent. Initially graded 9a, Alex Megos would upgrade the route to 9b after his ascent in April 2021.

9a+ (5.15a):

- Nit de bruixes - Margalef (ESP) - July 1, 2012 - Second ascent (first ascent by Iker Pou)
- Catxasa - Santa Linya (ESP) - June 26, 2012 - Second ascent (first ascent by Chris Sharma, 2011)
- Demencia Senil - Margalef (ESP) - October 11, 2010 - Third ascent (first ascent by Chris Sharma)
- Papichulo - Oliana (ESP) - March 21, 2009 - Third ascent (first ascent by Chris Sharma)
- Directa Open your mind - Santa Linya (ESP) - December 8, 2008 - First ascent
- Realization - Céüse (FRA) - July 28, 2008 - Sixth ascent
- La Rambla - Siurana (ESP) - March 8, 2003 - First ascent of the extended version of the route

9a (5.14d):

- San Ku Kaï - Entraygues (FRA) - August 4, 2011
- Le Cadre Nouvelle Version - Céüse (FRA) - August 3, 2011
- Duele la realidad - Oliana (ESP) - November 1, 2010 - First ascent
- Samfaina - Margalef (ESP) - July 4, 2010 - Second ascent (first ascent by Chris Sharma)
- Era Vella - Margalef (ESP) - June 5, 2010 - Second ascent (first ascent by Chris Sharma)
- Supernowa - Vadiello (ESP) - September 12, 2009
- El Gran Bellanco - Montanejos (ESP) - May 1, 2009 - First ascent by Pedro Pons, 2003
- La Novena enmienda - Santa Linya (ESP) - December 9, 2008
- Fabelita r2 - Santa Linya (ESP) - December 9, 2008
- Fuck The system - Santa Linya (ESP) - November 29, 2008
- Victimas Perez - Margalef (ESP) - October 26, 2008 - First ascent
- Gancho perfecto - Margalef (ESP) - July 5, 2008 - Second ascent (first ascent by Chris Sharma)
- El templo del cafe - Alquezar (ESP) - March 24, 2008
- M. ALBA - Savassona (ESP) - December 2, 2007
- Definicion de resistencia democrata - Terradets (ESP) - November 20, 2007
- Esclatamasters - Perles (ESP) - April 17, 2006 - First ascent
- Estado critico - Siurana (ESP) - March 15, 2004 - First ascent
- KinematiX - Gorges du Loup (FRA) - August 13, 2002

=== Onsighted routes ===
8c+ (5.14c):

- The Crew - Rifle (USA) - October 11, 2011

8c (5.14b):

- Amistad - Rodellar (ESP) - September 11, 2009
- Malsoñando - Gandía (ESP) - November 23, 2006
- iron man r2 - Rodellar (ESP) - September 10, 2006
- Suma O - Cuenca (ESP) - May 29, 2006

== See also ==
- List of grade milestones in rock climbing
- History of rock climbing
- Rankings of most career IFSC gold medals
