= Pron =

Pron may refer to:

== People ==
- Cristina Giai Pron (born 1974), Italian canoeist
- Maria Clara Giai Pron (born 1992), Italian canoeist
- Patricio Pron (born 1975), Argentinian writer
- Viktoria Pron (born 1965), Ukrainian badminton player

== Other uses ==
- Patriotic Movement for National Rebirth (Polish: Patriotyczny Ruch Odrodzenia Narodowego)
- PrON chemical formula for Praseodymium(V) oxide nitride

== Misspellings ==
- Porn, short for pornography
- Porn (disambiguation)
- Pr0n, leetspeak for pornography

== See also ==
- Prong (disambiguation)
- Louis DaPron (1913–1987), U.S. dancer and choreographer
- Timothy DuPron Hauser (1941–2014), U.S. singer
