= Porn (disambiguation) =

Porn is a common short form for pornography. It may also refer to:

== Media ==
- Alt porn, alternative pornography often produced by small and independent websites or filmmakers
- Bavarian porn, a campy subgenre of comic erotic cinema from Germany
- Food porn, a glamourized spectacular visual presentation of cooking or eating in advertisements, infomercials, cooking shows or other visual media
- Inspiration porn, the calling of people with disabilities inspirational
- Mobile porn, pornography transmitted over mobile telecommunications networks
- Pessimism porn, alleged eschatological and survivalist thrill some people derive from predicting, reading and fantasizing about the collapse of civil society through the destruction of the world's economic system
- Poverty porn, any type of media, be it written, photographed or filmed, which exploits the poor's condition in order to generate the necessary sympathy for selling newspapers or increasing charitable donations or support for a given cause
- Revenge porn, sexually explicit media that is publicly shared online without the consent of the pictured individual

== Other uses ==
- Progressive outer retinal necrosis (PORN), a disease of the retina of the eye
- Men of Porn, a San Francisco band consisting of founder Tim Moss, Dale Crover and Billy Anderson
- "Porn", a song by Hammerhead released by Amphetamine Reptile Records
- Þorn (thorn, dorn), a letter used in Germanic languages

== See also ==
- Pr0n in leetspeek
- Pornography (disambiguation)
- Pawn (disambiguation)
- Pron (disambiguation)
