= Big UP Productions =

American climbing film maker

- Company type: Private
- Genre: Adventure sports documentary films
- Founder: Josh Lowell
- Headquarters: New York, USA

Big UP Productions is an American film production company based in New York City who are particularly known for work in the area of rock climbing. The company is led by Josh Lowell, and films include titles such as: Free Hueco! (1998), Rampage (1999), Dosage Volume 1 (2001), Pilgrimage (2003), Dosage Volume 2 (2004), Dosage Volume 3 (2005), Dosage Volume 4 (2006), King Lines (2007) which was co-produced with Sender Films, Dosage Volume 5 (2008), and Progression (2009). From 2010, they have been actively producing series of Reel Rock films along with Sender Films. Rock climbers profiled in Big UP Production films included leading names such as: Chris Sharma, Tommy Caldwell, and Tim Emmett. In 2006, Big UP Productions and Sender Films received a Sports Emmy for "Outstanding Camera Work" for their work filming American climber Chris Sharma's first ascent of deep-water soloing route Es Pontàs, in Mallorca Spain; it was part of the climbing film King Lines.
