= Nau (clothing retailer) =

American clothing company

Nau International, Inc
- Traded as: Nau
- Industry: Clothing, Accessories, Sustainable clothing
- Founded: 2007
- Founder: Eric Reynolds, Chris van Dyke, Mark Galbraith, Jil Zilligen, and Ian Yolles
- Headquarters: Portland, Oregon, United States
- Area served: Worldwide
- Key people: Jun Kang (President); DH Lee (VP); Mark Galbraith (GM); Greg Keeling; Allison Ross; Nick Lawrence; Brent Damkroger; Kyle Duford
- Products: Jackets, Hard Shells, Soft Shells, Shirts, Pants, Dresses, Shorts, Skirts, Sunglasses,
- Number of employees: 20
- Parent: Black Yak
- Website: www.nau.com

Nau is a clothing company, founded in 2007 by Marmot founder Eric Reynolds and based in Portland, Oregon, United States.

== Sustainability ==
The company's business model includes the use of textiles developed from sustainable technical fibers and fabrics in line with the Global Organic Textile Standard (GOTS). Nau also makes use of ethical Merino and other wools within its products as well as other uniques such as recycled polyester, Tencel, Cocona synthetic down and ethically-sourced goose down All employees of Nau are provided free public transport and carbon offsetting tokens purchased for corporate travel and product to customer deliveries. Nau was named Outside magazine's Best Companies to Work for in 2010.

== Partners for Change program ==
Nau's core business plan involves a donation of 2% from each sale to selected community partners through their "Partners for Change" program, where the customer chooses one of the organizations after their purchase. As of 2014, these partners were People for BIkes, Ashoka, Breakthrough Institute, Mercy Corp and EcoTrust. Nau donates 100% of those collected to these organizations.

== Ownership ==
Nau opened numerous retail stores across the United States (Portland, San Francisco, Chicago and others), but on May 2, 2008, Nau announced that it was ceasing operations, primarily due to an inability to raise further capital. In 2008, Nau was purchased by Horny Toad, Inc. and reopened for trade in October of that year.

In October 2013, Horny Toad sold the Nau brand to Korean-based Black Yak for an undisclosed amount with plans to continue the growth of the business through online, wholesale and eventually its own retail channels.

== Retail operations ==
Nau's original stores, called Webfronts, combined a small selection of clothing for customers to examine and try on with in-store online ordering. Customers could buy items in the store or receive a 10 percent discount by ordering them for home delivery from Nau's warehouse.

Nau opened four Webfronts in 2007, in Boulder, Colorado; Tualatin, Oregon, in the Portland area; Bellevue, Washington; and Chicago. A fifth opened in Los Angeles in April 2008. The company also announced plans for stores in northwest Portland, Seattle, San Francisco and Boston, but those locations had not opened when the original business closed in May 2008.

After Horny Toad purchased Nau's assets and relaunched the brand in 2008, Nau did not reopen its Webfronts. Instead, it sold clothing online and through other retailers. Nau opened a new store in Portland's Pearl District in 2015.
