= Movement (company) =

American climbing gym chain

Movement Climbing, Yoga, and Fitness
- Predecessors: Earth Treks; El Cap; Movement (Note: Legacy Movement facilities were branded Movement Climbing + Fitness from 2009 to 2021); Planet Granite; The Cliffs; Summit
- Headquarters: Englewood, Colorado, United States
- Website: movementgyms.com

Movement Climbing, Yoga, and Fitness is an American chain of climbing gyms. The company is composed of several smaller chains via mergers and acquisitions; its earliest businesses opened in the early 1990s. After consolidating its three chains under the Movement brand in 2021, it acquired two other chains in 2023. It operates 32 locations across the United States as of 2026. The company has had disputes with its labor unions since 2022.

== History ==
=== 1990s–2017: Early history, Earth Treks, and Planet Granite ===
Earth Treks was established in the early 1990s (Note: Jason Blevins of The Colorado Sun reported that Earth Treks was seven years old at the time its first location opened in 1997.) as a guiding company for bicycling, mountaineering, and rock climbing. It opened its first climbing gym in 1997, in Columbia, Maryland, and decided to expand after making $1 million in annual revenue by 2001. It opened a facility in Timonium in 2002, and another in Rockville in 2006. By 2017, Earth Treks had expanded to five locations, including one in Golden, Colorado.

Planet Granite opened its first location in 1994 in Santa Clara, California, with 14,000 square feet (1,300 m^{2}) of climbing walls and 76 ropes. In addition to climbing, the gym also contained areas for weight training and aerobics. It opened a second location in Belmont in 2002, on the site of an abandoned theater, and had a third location in Sunnyvale within the next four years. Planet Granite opened a 30,000-square-foot (2,800 m^{2}) location in Portland, Oregon, in 2014.

=== 2017–2022: Mergers and rebranding ===
Planet Granite and Earth Treks merged in 2017, and El Cap (named after El Capitan in Yosemite National Park) was created as their parent organization in 2018, making it the largest indoor climbing company in the United States. It served 2 million visitors and employed over 1,000 people that year. Earth Treks also opened a 53,000-square-foot (4,900 m^{2}) location in Englewood, Colorado, the largest facility of its kind at the time.

In 2019, El Cap acquired the Colorado-based Movement and its locations in Denver and Boulder. Movement had been founded in 2009. Planet Granite also opened two bouldering-only locations in 2019: one in Santa Clara, and a 30,000-square-foot (2,800 m^{2}) one in Fountain Valley, California. All El Cap locations rebranded to Movement Climbing, Yoga, and Fitness in 2021. The company opened two new locations in Chicago, Illinois, in 2021, and two in Dallas, Texas, in 2021 and 2022.

=== 2022–present: More acquisitions and labor unions ===
The staff of the Crystal City, Virginia, location became the first climbing gym in the United States to unionize and be certified by the National Labor Relations Board (NLRB) in 2022, with support from Workers United. After initially advising employees to vote against the labor union, the company filed objections with the NLRB around procedural aspects of the election, which were dismissed. Union organizers also resigned from their full-time positions, reporting increased pressure and scrutiny from managers.

Movement leadership began the collective bargaining process fourteen months after the election results, and spent at least a year negotiating without agreement on an employment contract. Anti-union messaging distributed at other Movement locations has emphasized the Crystal City union's lack of a contract. The NLRB began investigations at this location on unfair labor practice charges in August 2023. Five other locations began unionization campaigns in 2023 and 2024.

In 2023, Movement acquired the Texas-based company Summit with four locations, including in Fort Worth and Plano. The company also acquired The Cliffs chain that year, with five locations in New York and Pennsylvania. It built a new location in Centennial, Colorado, which opened in 2024.

Workers United brought more unfair labor practice charges against the company in 2026. By this time, nine Movement locations – including Crystal City – had unionized but had yet to negotiate a contract. A representative for Workers United claimed this was indicative of Movement executives bargaining in bad faith, a view which the company contested.

Movement operates 32 locations across the United States as of 2026. The company announced plans to open a new location in Clackamas, Oregon, by 2027, close to its existing location in Portland.

== Accolades ==
A newly opened location in the Lincoln Park area of Chicago won the Climbing Business Journal award in 2021 for the tallest climbing gym, and the Design District, Dallas, location won for the largest climbing gym in 2022. The location in Centennial took the Journal's largest gym award in 2024. In 2025, Movement's Englewood location won Westword's Readers' Choice award for Best Climbing Gym.
