= Pawn Stars (disambiguation) =

Pawn Stars is an American reality television series.

Pawn Stars may also refer to:

- Pawn Stars Australia, Australian TV series
- Pawn Stars UK, UK TV series

== See also ==
- Cajun Pawn Stars, American TV series
- Hardcore Pawn, American TV series
