= Shrimp (disambiguation) =

Shrimp are stalk-eyed swimming crustaceans. Shrimp may also refer to:

== Food ==
- Shrimp (food), a shellfish used as food
- Barratts Shrimps, a British candy in the shape of a shrimp

== People ==
- Lloyd Andrews (ice hockey) (1894-1974), a Canadian National Hockey League player nicknamed "Shrimp"
- Albert Burns (motorcyclist) (1898-1921), American dirt and board track motorcycle racer nicknamed "Shrimp"
- Michael Chambers (born 1967) American dancer and actor nicknamed "Boogaloo Shrimp"
- Henry Thomas Davies (1914–2002), English lifeboatman nicknamed "Shrimp"
- H. D. G. Leveson Gower (1873-1954), English cricketer nicknamed "Shrimp"
- Jean Shrimpton (born 1942), English former supermodel nicknamed "The Shrimp"

== Military ==
- SHRIMP, the device detonated in the 1954 Castle Bravo American nuclear test
- Saro Shrimp, a 1930s British experimental flying boat
- Operation Shrimp, a 1977 attempted coup led by mercenary Bob Denard in Benin
- USS Shrimp (SP-645), a United States Navy patrol vessel in commission from 1917 to 1918

== Sports ==
- Shrimp, term for an escape in grappling wherein one mimics the locomotion of the crustacean
- Morecambe FC, English football club nicknamed The Shrimps
- Jacksonville Jumbo Shrimp, a Minor League Baseball team

== Other uses ==
- Sensitive high-resolution ion microprobe (SHRIMP), a material analysis instrument primarily used for geological and geochemical applications
- Shrimp (dinghy), a Canadian boat design
- Shrimps (brand), British fashion brand founded by Hannah Weiland
- The Shrimp, a children's novel by Emily Smith
