= Les Avellanes i Santa Linya =

- Municipality
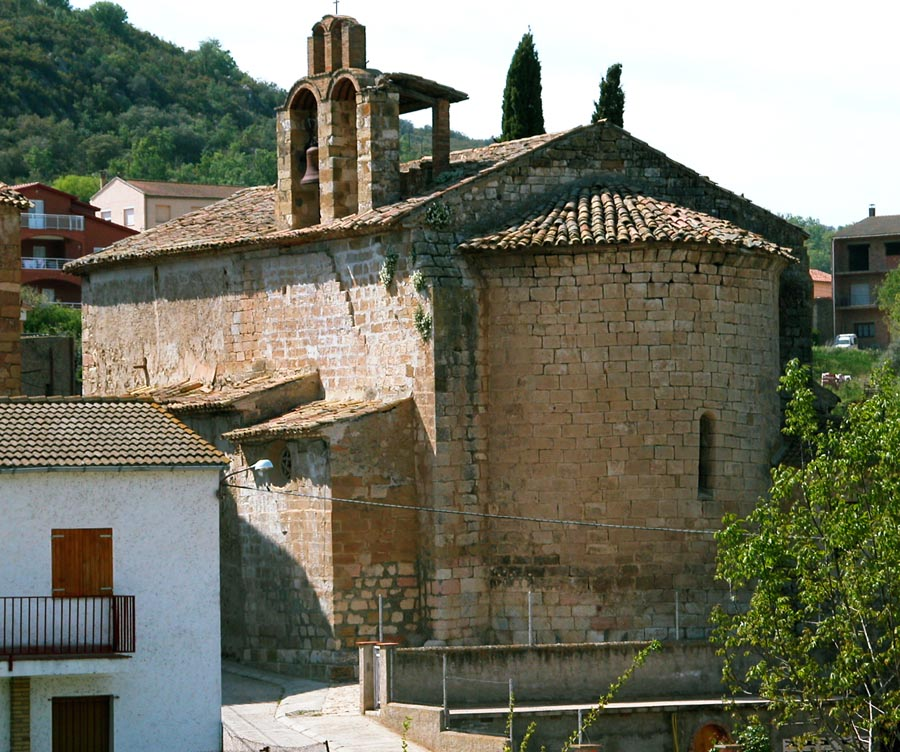
- St. Mary's church, les Avellanes

- Coat of arms

- Location in Catalonia
- Coordinates: 41°54′33″N 0°45′57″E
- Country: Spain
- Community: Catalonia
- Province: Lleida
- Comarca: Noguera

Government
  - Mayor: Lidia Ber Salmons (2015)

Area
  - Total: 103.0 km^{2} (39.8 sq mi)
- Elevation: 567 m (1,860 ft)

Population (2025-01-01)
  - Total: 434
  - Density: 4.21/km^{2} (10.9/sq mi)
- Postal code: 25612
- Website: www.ccnoguera.cat/avellanes

Les Avellanes i Santa Linya (Catalan pronunciation: [lez aβeˈʎanez i ˈsanta ˈliɲa]) is a municipality in the comarca of Noguera, in the province of Lleida, Catalonia, Spain. It has a population of 434 (register office, 2025).

The municipality was formed in 1970 after the merger of Les Avellanes, Santa Linya, Tartareu and Vilanova de la Sal. Sights include the 16th-century church and the medieval alleys in Santa Linya.
