= Oliana =

- Municipality
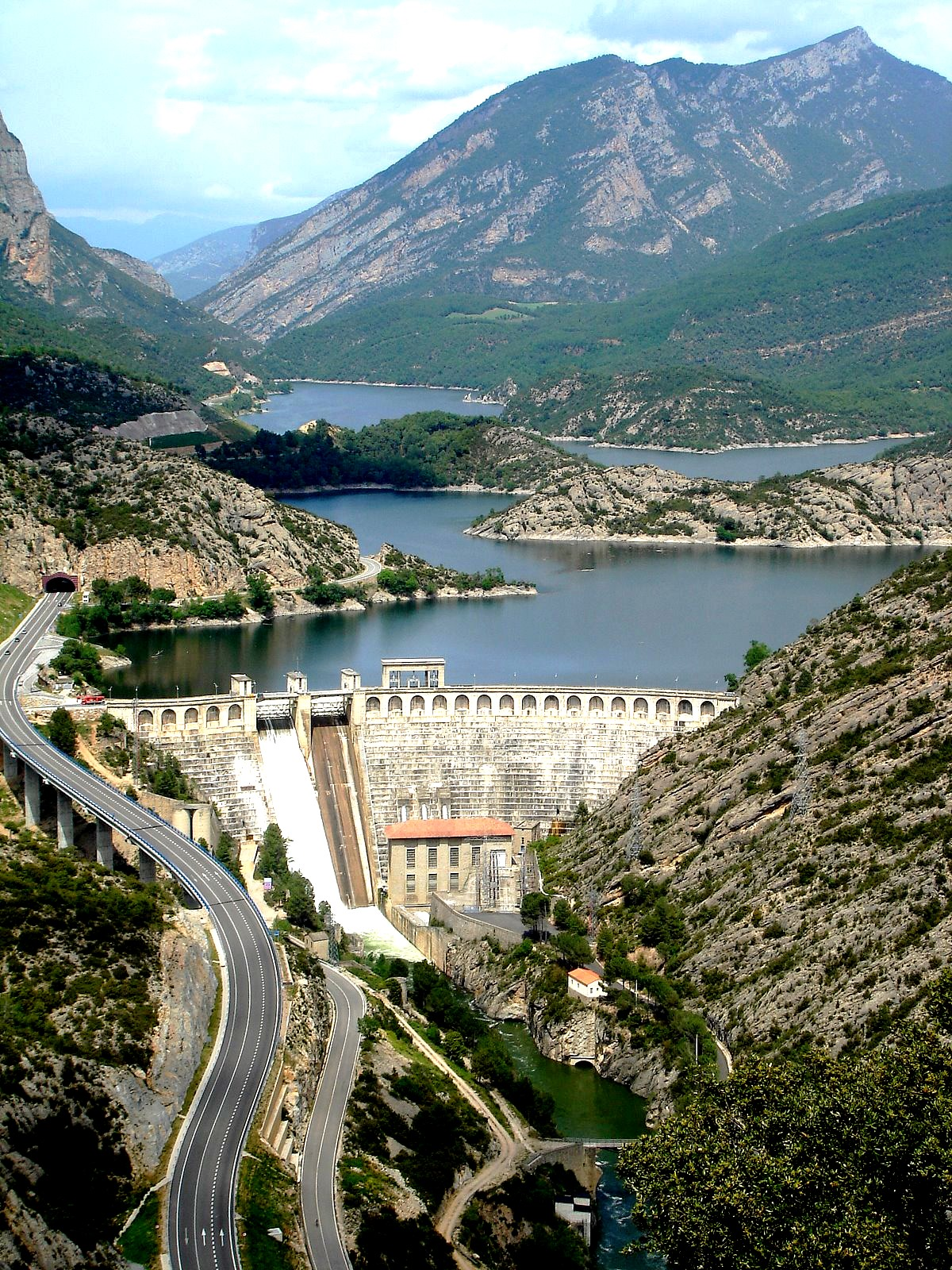

- Coat of arms

- Location in Catalonia
- Coordinates: 42°04′N 1°19′E
- Country: Spain
- Community: Catalonia
- Province: Lleida
- Comarca: Alt Urgell

Government
  - Mayor: Carme Lostao Otero (2019)

Area
  - Total: 32.4 km^{2} (12.5 sq mi)
- Elevation: 469 m (1,539 ft)

Population (2025-01-01)
  - Total: 1,874
  - Density: 57.8/km^{2} (150/sq mi)
- Website: oliana.cat

Oliana (Catalan pronunciation: [oliˈanɛ]) is a municipality in the comarca of the Alt Urgell in Catalonia, Spain. It is situated in the Segre valley immediately below the Oliana reservoir. There is a factory of domestic electrical appliances in the town, and the presence of non-farming employment has meant that Oliana has escaped the depopulation experienced by most municipalities in north-west Catalonia. It is currently the second-largest town (by population) in the Alt Urgell, behind the comarcal capital La Seu d'Urgell. The town is served by the C-14 road between Ponts and La Seu d'Urgell. It has a population of 1,874 (register office, 2025).

== Demography ==
1900	1930	1950	1970	1986	2005
986	1127	1793	1793	2075	1932

== Subdivisions ==
The municipality of Oliana includes two outlying villages. Populations are given as of 2001:

- Les Anoves (27)
- El Castell (73)

== Climbing ==
The region is well known among rock climbers for its extremely difficult limestone cliffs, including La Dura Dura ("the hardest of the hard"), which is one of the hardest climbs successfully undertaken in the world.
