= Siurana (Tarragona) =

Village in Spain

Coordinates: 41°15′N 0°56′E

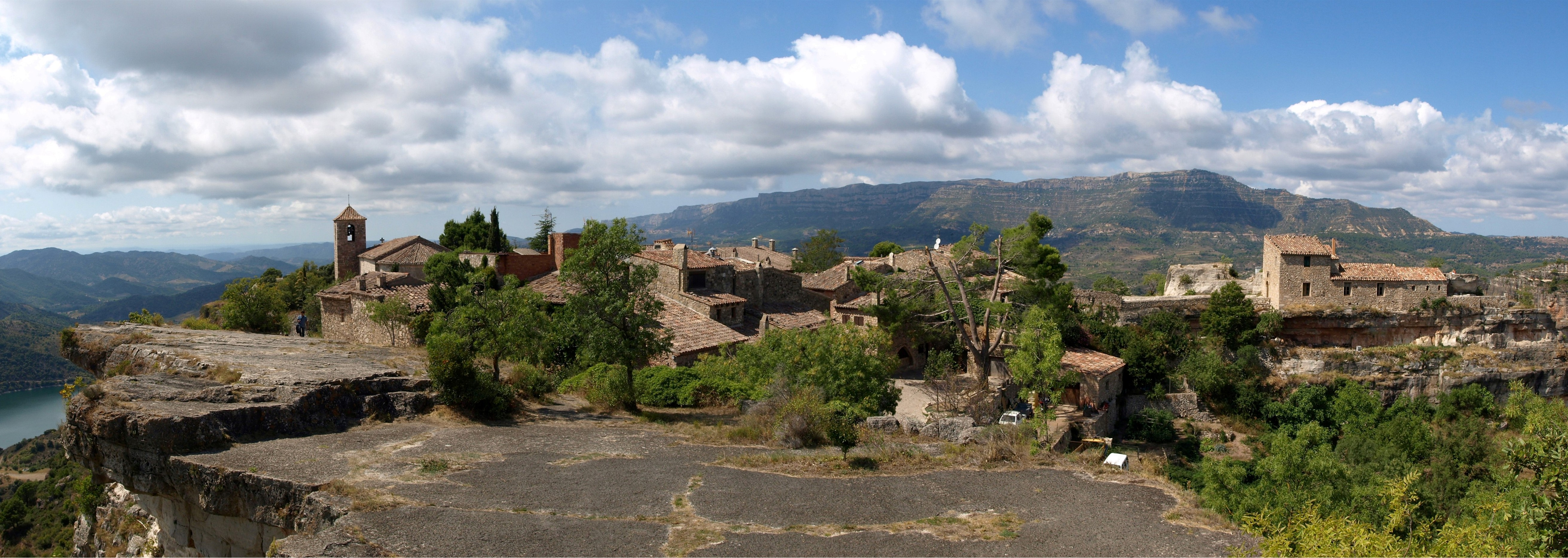
Panoramic view of Siurana

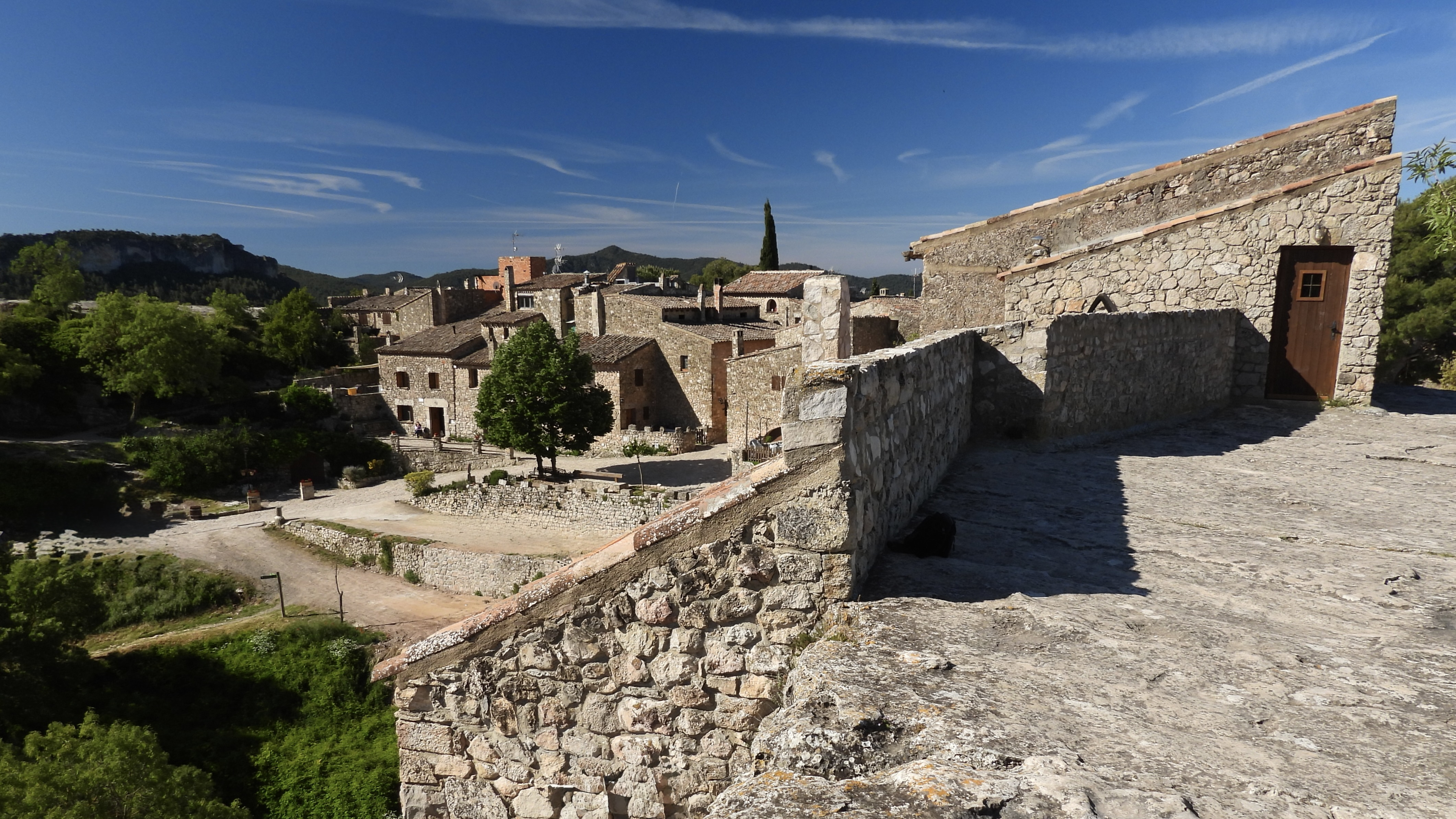
A rooftop view of the village of Siurana, Spain.

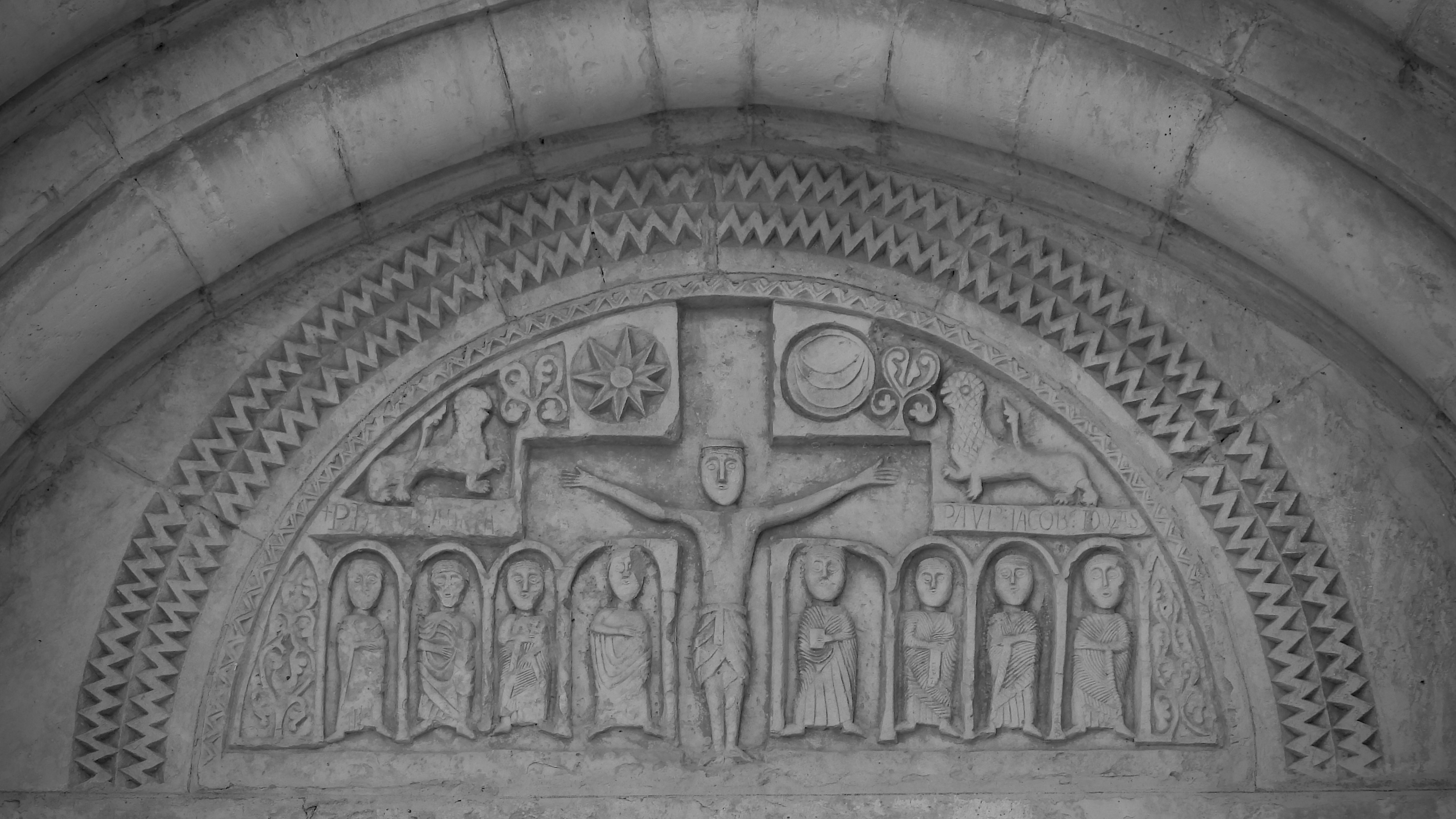
A close-up view of the tympanum over the southern portal of the Church of Santa Maria of Siurana. (Black & white)

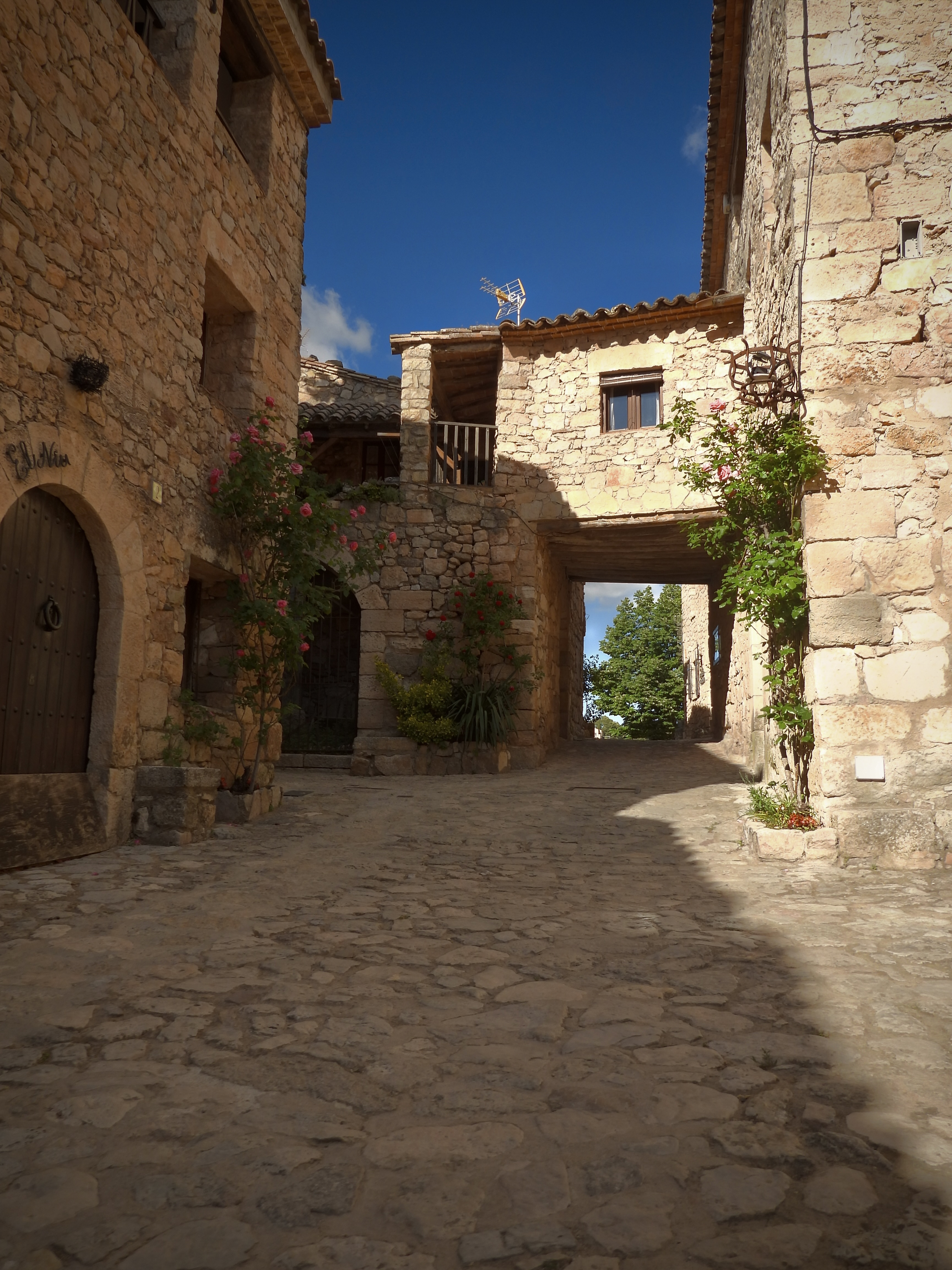
Walking down a cobbled footpath within the town of Siurana, Spain.

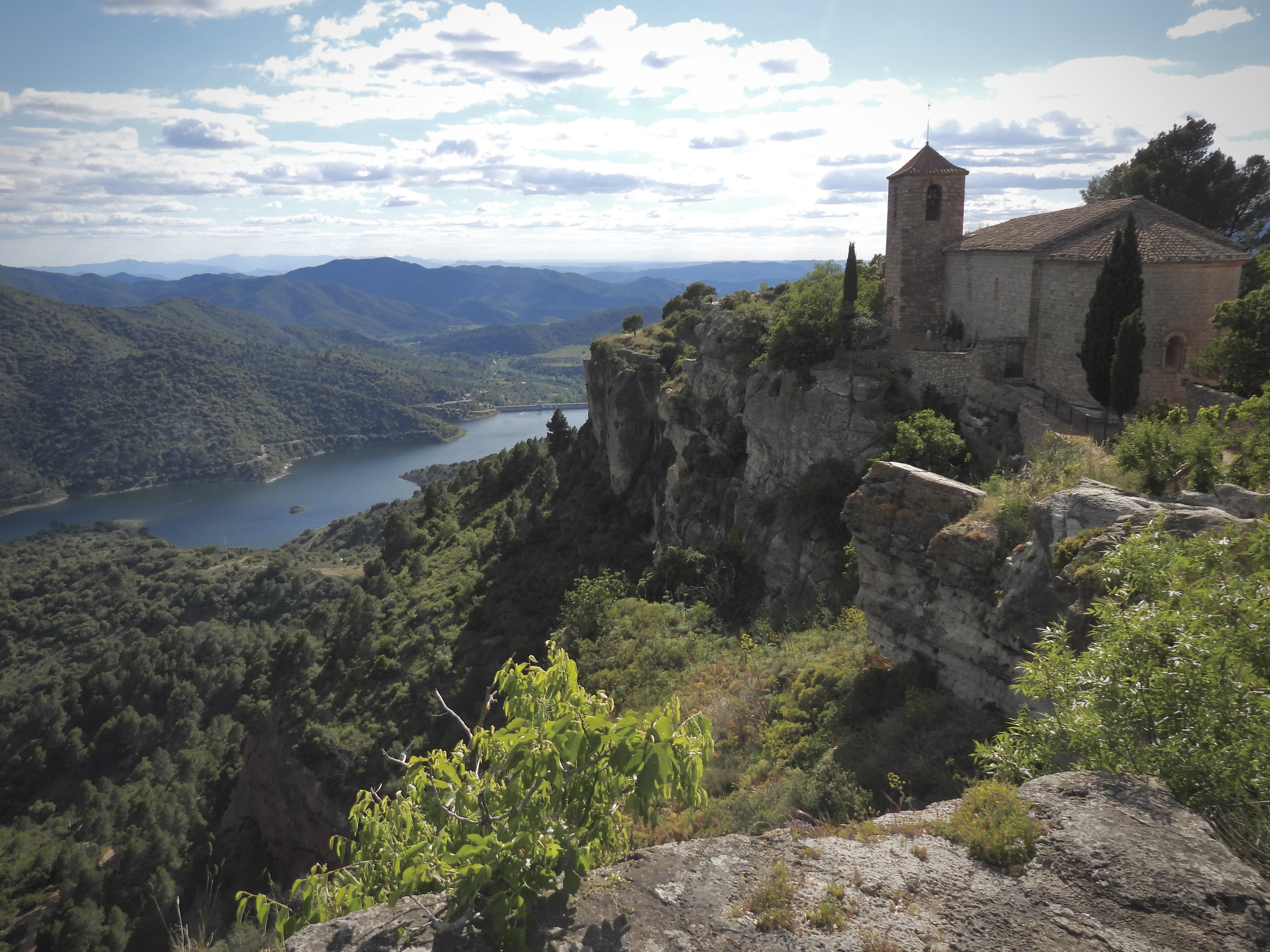
The Església de Santa Maria de Siurana o Mare de Déu de l'Aigua overlooking the Siurana Reservoir.

Siurana is a village of the municipality of the Cornudella de Montsant in the comarca of Priorat, Tarragona, Catalonia, Spain.

Located just outside the Montsant region, it is just east of the main town of the municipality Cornudella de Montsant and consists of a small village at the top of an escarpment in the Prades Mountains overlooking the Siurana Reservoir and is often visited by tourists to the area for its historical relevance, rock climbing conditions, and excellent views of the reservoir and surrounding valley.

== History ==
La Siurana is the Christian name for the town. Originally, it was known by the Latin name of La Seviriana but was changed to Xibrana after being conquered by the Umayyads. A memorial cross was erected in 1953 to commemorate the reconquest of Siurana 800 years before in 1153, the last Muslim enclave to fall to the Christians in Catalonia.

== Climbing ==
The limestone cliffs around the village are popular among sport climbers from around the world due to the wide range of climbs up to grade 9b+ (5.15c), including internationally renowned sport climbs such as La Rambla. The development of Siurana as one of the world's leading climbing destinations has been attributed to Toni Arbones.
