= Margalef =

- Municipality
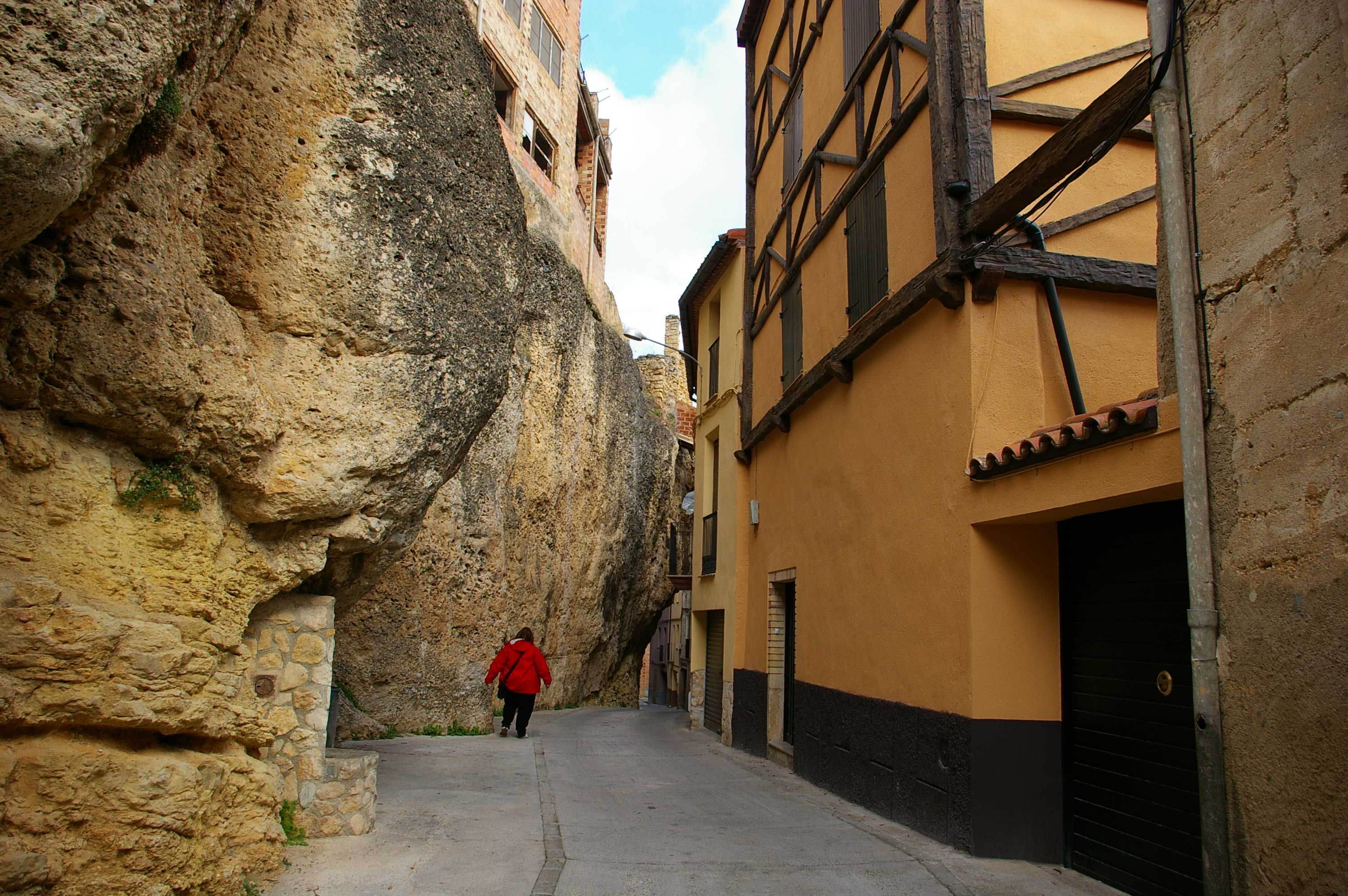

- Seal

- Location in Catalonia
- Coordinates: 41°17′7″N 0°45′15″E
- Country: Spain
- Autonomous community: Catalonia
- Province: Tarragona
- Comarca: Priorat

Government
  - mayor: Joaquim Vila Gibert (2015)

Area
  - Total: 34.7 km^{2} (13.4 sq mi)
- Elevation: 379 m (1,243 ft)

Population (2025-01-01)
  - Total: 106
  - Density: 3.05/km^{2} (7.91/sq mi)
- Demonym(s): Margalefà, margalefana
- Website: margalef.org

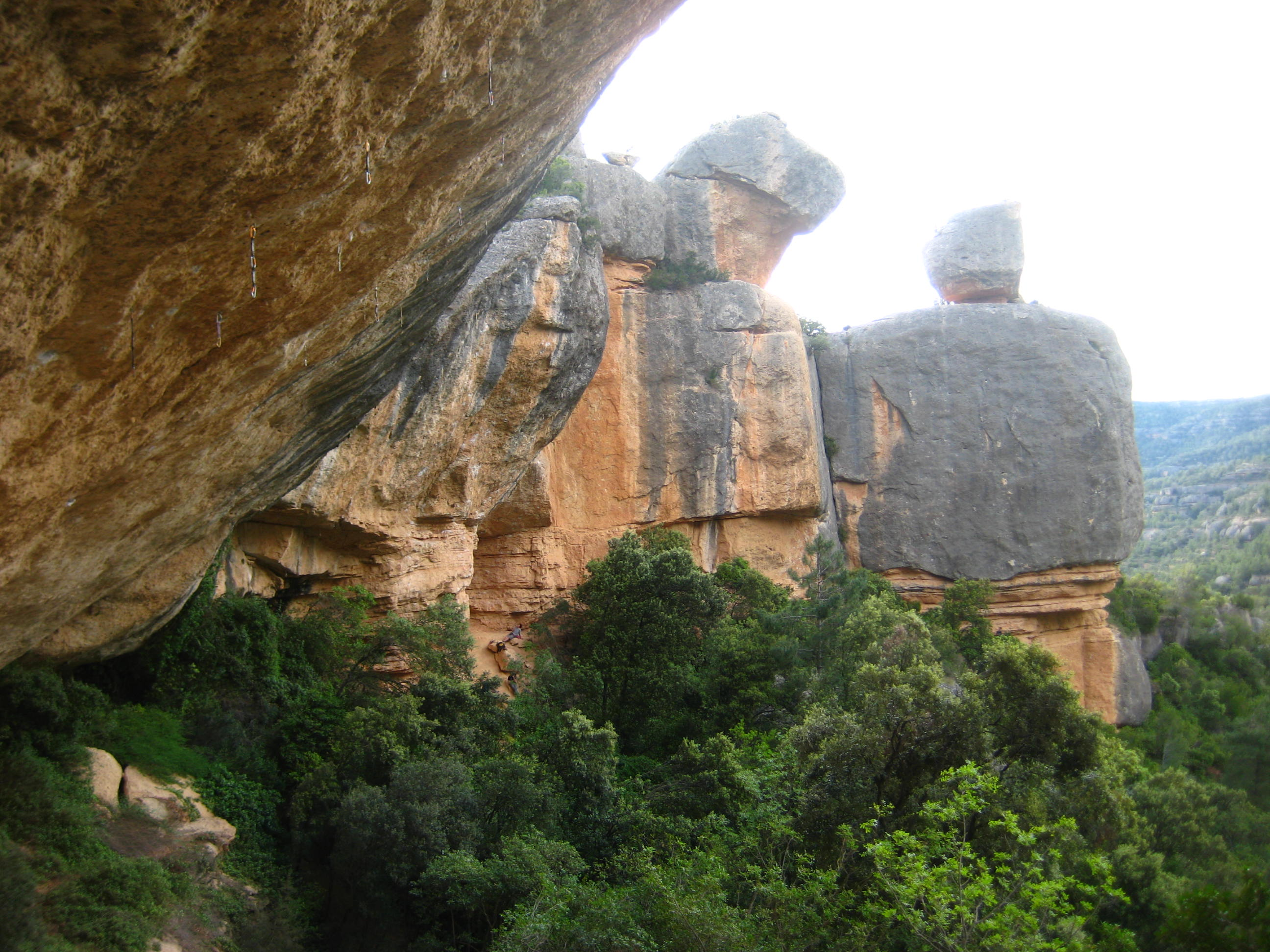
Rocks and climbing routes in Margalef

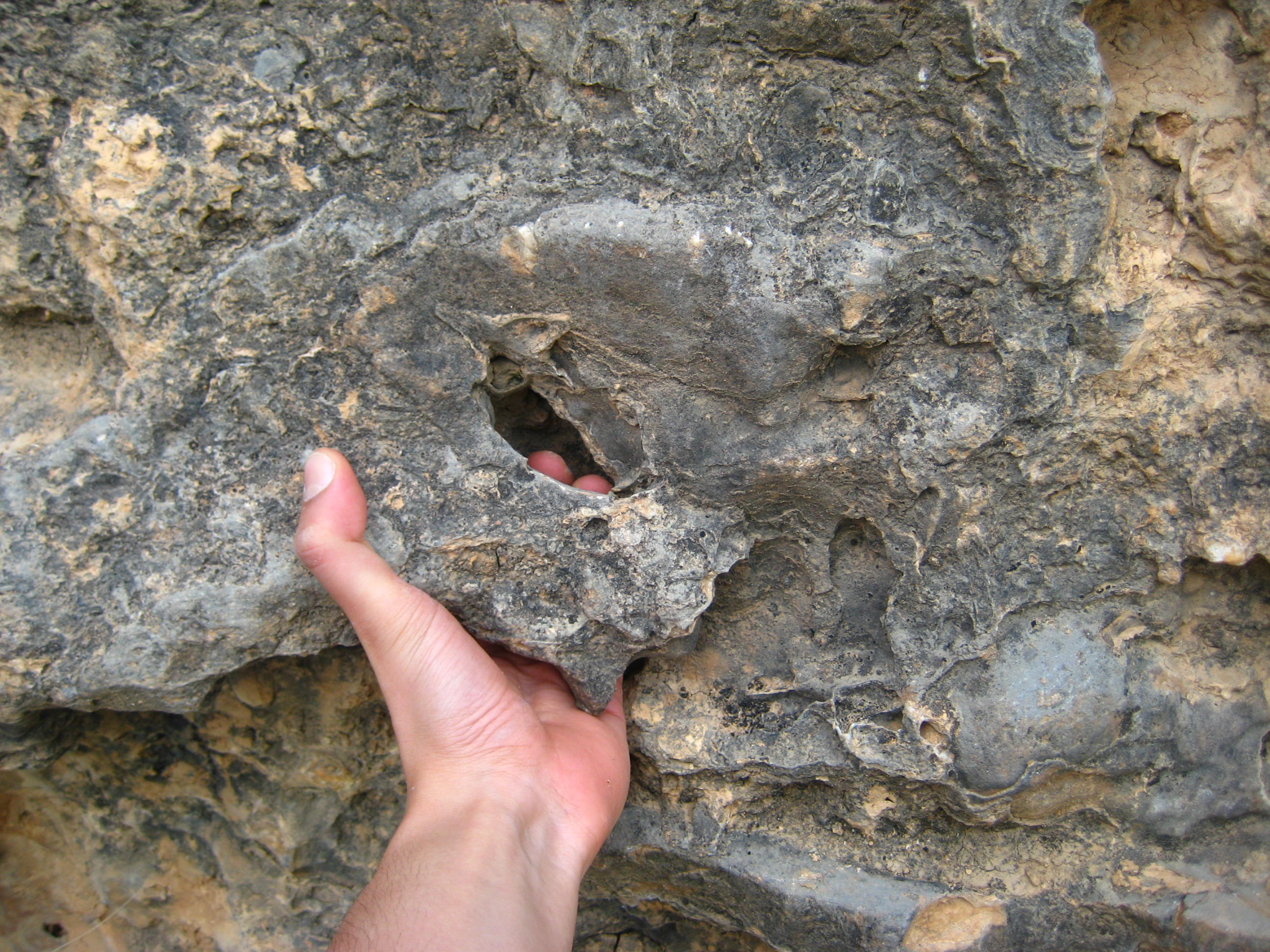
Forat hold on a Conglomerate rock in Margalef

Margalef (Catalan pronunciation: [maɾɣaˈlɛf]) is a village in Catalonia, Spain. It is situated on the edge of Montsant and is a popular ecotourism destination, especially among rock climbers. It has a population of 106 (register office, 2025).

The rock type is conglomerate and it has more than 1500 climbing routes of different grades, from 4 to 9b+. Many of the buildings in the village are also built on conglomerate formations.

Margalef's important economic activity is agriculture, mainly producing olives, almonds, and fruits.
