= 1997 UIAA Climbing World Championships =

- Location: Paris, France
- Date: 31 January – 1 February 1997
- Competitors: 153 from 26 nations

The 1997 UIAA Climbing World Championships, the 4th edition, were held in Paris, France, from 31 January to 1 February 1997. It was organized by the Union Internationale des Associations d'Alpinisme (UIAA). The championships consisted of lead and speed events.

== Medalists ==
Event	Gold	Silver	Bronze
Men's Lead	François Petit; France	Chris Sharma; United States	François Legrand; France
Men's Speed	Daniel Andrada; Spain	Yevgen Kryvosheytsev; Ukraine	Dmitry Bychkov; Russia
Women's Lead	Liv Sansoz; France	Muriel Sarkany; Belgium	Marietta Uhden; Germany
Women's Speed	Tatiana Ruyga; Russia	Irina Zaytseva; Russia	Olga Bibik; Russia

== Lead ==
In men's lead, François Petit claimed the title. The 15-year-old Chris Sharma took silver, while the defending champion François Legrand took bronze.

In women's lead, Liv Sansoz took the win. Muriel Sarkany took second place, while Marietta Uhden took third.

Men				Women			
Rank	Name	Nation	Result	Rank	Name	Nation	Result
1st place, gold medalist(s)	François Petit	France	8000	1st place, gold medalist(s)	Liv Sansoz	France	6700
2nd place, silver medalist(s)	Chris Sharma	United States	6400	2nd place, silver medalist(s)	Muriel Sarkany	Belgium	5360
3rd place, bronze medalist(s)	François Legrand	France	5200	3rd place, bronze medalist(s)	Marietta Uhden	Germany	4355
4	Jean-Baptiste Tribout	France	4400	4	Venera Chereshneva	Russia	3685
5	Elie Chevieux	Switzerland	4080	5	Stéphanie Bodet	France	3417
6	Yuji Hirayama	Japan	3760	6	Laurence Guyon	France	3149
7	Christian Core	Italy	3440	7	Cecile Avezou	France	2881
8	Arnaud Petit	France	3200	8	Luisa Iovane	Italy	2680
9	Daniel Andrada Jimenez	Spain	2960	9	Elena Choumilova	Russia	2479
10	Frederic Sarkany	Belgium	2720	10	Marie Guillet	France	2278

== Speed ==
Daniel Andrada Jimenez and Tatiana Ruyga were the 1997 Speed World Champions.

Men			Women		
Rank	Name	Nation	Rank	Name	Nation
1st place, gold medalist(s)	Daniel Andrada Jimenez	Spain	1st place, gold medalist(s)	Tatiana Ruyga	Russia
2nd place, silver medalist(s)	Yevgen Kryvosheytsev	Ukraine	2nd place, silver medalist(s)	Irina Zaytseva	Russia
3rd place, bronze medalist(s)	Dmitrii Bychkov	Russia	3rd place, bronze medalist(s)	Olga Bibik	Russia
4	Hans Florine	United States	4	Marie Dutray	France
5	Tomasz Oleksy	Poland	5	Kim Anthoni	Belgium
5	Alexandr Paukaev	Ukraine	5	Jitka Kuhngaberova	Czech Republic
5	Kairat Rakhmetov	Kazakhstan	5	Mayya Piratinskaya	Russia
8	Gareth Parry	Great Britain	5	Renata Piszczek	Poland
9	Andrey Vedenmeer	Ukraine	9	Zosia Podgorbounskikh	Russia
10	Salavat Rakhmetov	Russia	10	Olena Ryepko	Ukraine
