= 2004 IFSC Climbing World Cup =

International sport climbing competition

- Location: Birmingham, England Erlangen, Germany; Puurs, Belgium; Imst, Austria; Fiera di Primiero, Italy; Chamonix, France; Val Daone, Italy; L'Argentière-la-Bessée, France; Bardonecchia, Italy; Marbella, Spain; Huzhou, China; Shanghai, China; Aprica, Italy; Valence, France; Brno, Czech Republic Kranj, Slovenia
- Date: 2 April – 20 November 2004

Champions
- Men: (B) (France) Daniel Du Lac (L) (Czech Republic) Tomáš Mrázek (S) (Russia) Sergei Sinitcyn
- Women: (B) (France) Sandrine Levet (L) (Austria) Angela Eiter (S) (Russia) Tatiana Ruyga

The 2004 IFSC Climbing World Cup was held in 16 locations. Bouldering competitions were held in 6 locations, lead in 9 locations, and speed in 3 locations. The season began on 2 April in Birmingham, England and concluded on 20 November in Kranj, Slovenia.

The top 3 in each competition received medals, and the overall winners were awarded trophies. At the end of the season an overall ranking was determined based upon points, which athletes were awarded for finishing in the top 30 of each individual event.

The winners for bouldering were Daniel Du Lac and Sandrine Levet, for lead Tomáš Mrázek and Angela Eiter, for speed Sergei Sinitcyn and Tatiana Ruyga, men and women respectively. The National Team for bouldering was France, for lead France, and for speed Russian Federation.

== Overview ==
No.	Location	D	G	Gold	Silver	Bronze
1	(United Kingdom) Birmingham; 2–4 April	B	M	(France) Daniel Du Lac	(Austria) Kilian Fischhuber	(United Kingdom) Gareth Parry
1	(United Kingdom) Birmingham; 2–4 April	B	W	(France) Sandrine Levet	(Russia) Olga Bibik	(Italy) Jenny Lavarda
2	(Germany) Erlangen; 15–16 April	B	M	(Austria) Kilian Fischhuber	(France) Jérôme Meyer	(France) Ludovic Laurence
2	(Germany) Erlangen; 15–16 April	B	W	(France) Sandrine Levet	(Russia) Yulia Abramchuk	(Italy) Jenny Lavarda
3	(Belgium) Puurs; 23–25 April	L	M	(Czech Republic) Tomáš Mrázek	(Switzerland) Cédric Lachat	(France) François Auclair
3	(Belgium) Puurs; 23–25 April	L	W	(Slovenia) Natalija Gros	(Belgium) Muriel Sarkany	(Italy) Jenny Lavarda
4	(Austria) Imst; 28–29 May	L	M	(France) Alexandre Chabot	(Czech Republic) Tomáš Mrázek	(Switzerland) Cédric Lachat
4	(Austria) Imst; 28–29 May	L	W	(Austria) Angela Eiter	(Austria) Bettina Schöpf	(Belgium) Muriel Sarkany
5	(Italy) Fiera di Primiero; 18–20 June	B	M	(Austria) Kilian Fischhuber	(France) Daniel Du Lac	(France) Julien Meral
5	(Italy) Fiera di Primiero; 18–20 June	B	W	(France) Sandrine Levet	(Russia) Olga Bibik	(France) Emilie Abgrall
6	(France) Chamonix; 11–12 July	L	M	(France) Alexandre Chabot	(Czech Republic) Tomáš Mrázek	(France) Sylvain Millet
6	(France) Chamonix; 11–12 July	L	W	(Belgium) Muriel Sarkany	(Austria) Angela Eiter	(Switzerland) Alexandra Eyer
6	(France) Chamonix; 11–12 July	S	M	(Russia) Evgenii Vaitsekhovskii	(Russia) Alexander Peshekhonov	(Russia) Sergei Sinitcyn
6	(France) Chamonix; 11–12 July	S	W	(Russia) Tatiana Ruyga	(Russia) Anna Stenkovaya	(Russia) Valentina Yurina
7	(Italy) Val Daone; 16–17 July	S	M	(Russia) Sergei Sinitcyn	(Russia) Alexander Peshekhonov	(Ukraine) Maksym Styenkovyy
7	(Italy) Val Daone; 16–17 July	S	W	(Russia) Tatiana Ruyga	(Indonesia) Agung Ethi Hendrawati	(Russia) Valentina Yurina
8	(France) L'Argentière-la-Bessée; 28–29 July	B	M	(France) Stephane Julien	(Italy) Christian Core	(France) Daniel Du Lac
8	(France) L'Argentière-la-Bessée; 28–29 July	B	W	(Russia) Olga Bibik	(France) Juliette Danion	(France) Sandrine Levet
9	(Italy) Bardonecchia; 19–21 August	B	M	(France) Daniel Du Lac	(Switzerland) Matthias Müller	(France) Loïc Gaidioz
9	(Italy) Bardonecchia; 19–21 August	B	W	(France) Sandrine Levet	(Italy) Giulia Giammarco	(Russia) Yulia Abramchuk
10	(Spain) Marbella; 17–18 September	L	M	(Czech Republic) Tomáš Mrázek	(France) Gérome Pouvreau	(Spain) Patxi Usobiaga
10	(Spain) Marbella; 17–18 September	L	W	(Belgium) Muriel Sarkany	(Slovenia) Martina Cufar	(Austria) Barabra Bacher
11	(China) Huzhou; 24–26 September	B	M	(France) Jérôme Meyer	(Russia) Salavat Rakhmetov	(Poland) Tomasz Oleksy
11	(China) Huzhou; 24–26 September	B	W	(France) Sandrine Levet	(Russia) Yulia Abramchuk	(Russia) Olga Bibik
12	(China) Shanghai; 1–2 October	L	M	(Czech Republic) Tomáš Mrázek	(Ukraine) Maksym Petrenko	(Spain) Patxi Usobiaga
12	(China) Shanghai; 1–2 October	L	W	(Austria) Angela Eiter	(France) Caroline Ciavaldini	(Belgium) Muriel Sarkany
12	(China) Shanghai; 1–2 October	S	M	(China) Xiaojie Chen	(Russia) Sergei Sinitcyn	(Russia) Evgenii Vaitsekhovskii
12	(China) Shanghai; 1–2 October	S	W	(Russia) Anna Stenkovaya	(Indonesia) Evi Neliwati	(Indonesia) Agung Ethi Hendrawati
13	(Italy) Aprica; 21–22 October	L	M	(France) Alexandre Chabot	(Czech Republic) Tomáš Mrázek	(Ukraine) Maksym Petrenko
13	(Italy) Aprica; 21–22 October	L	W	(Austria) Angela Eiter	(Austria) Bettina Schöpf	(Switzerland) Alexandra Eyer
14	(France) Valence; 28–29 October	L	M	(France) Alexandre Chabot	(Germany) Christian Bindhammer	(Czech Republic) Tomáš Mrázek
14	(France) Valence; 28–29 October	L	W	(Belgium) Muriel Sarkany	(France) Caroline Ciavaldini	(Slovenia) Martina Cufar
15	(Czech Republic) Brno; 11–12 November	L	M	(Italy) Flavio Crespi	(Czech Republic) Tomáš Mrázek	(France) Alexandre Chabot
15	(Czech Republic) Brno; 11–12 November	L	W	(Switzerland) Alexandra Eyer	(Ukraine) Olga Shalagina	(Slovenia) Maja Stremfelj
16	(Slovenia) Kranj; 19–20 November	L	M	(Czech Republic) Tomáš Mrázek	(Russia) Evgeny Ovchinnikov	(Netherlands) Jorg Verhoeven
16	(Slovenia) Kranj; 19–20 November	L	W	(Austria) Angela Eiter	(Slovenia) Natalija Gros	(France) Sandrine Levet
OVERALL		B	M	(France) Daniel Du Lac; 388	(Austria) Kilian Fischhuber; 331	(France) Jérôme Meyer; 305
OVERALL		B	W	(France) Sandrine Levet; 500	(Russia) Olga Bibik; 359	(Russia) Yulia Abramchuk; 331
OVERALL		L	M	(Czech Republic) Tomáš Mrázek; 800	(France) Alexandre Chabot; 656	(Italy) Flavio Crespi; 499
OVERALL		L	W	(Austria) Angela Eiter; 800	(Belgium) Muriel Sarkany; 557	(Switzerland) Alexandra Eyer; 458
OVERALL		S	M	(Russia) Sergei Sinitcyn; 245	(Russia) Evgenii Vaitsekhovskii; 202	(Russia) Alexander Peshekhonov; 197
OVERALL		S	W	(Russia) Tatiana Ruyga; 255	(Russia) Anna Stenkovaya; 235	(Indonesia) Agung Ethi Hendrawati; 182
NATIONAL TEAMS		B	A	France; 2014	Italy; 816.65	(Russia) Russian Federation; 814.5
NATIONAL TEAMS		L	A	France; 2437.5	Austria; 1652.92	Slovenia; 1545.67
NATIONAL TEAMS		S	A	(Russia) Russian Federation; 1327.25	Ukraine; 484.75	Poland; 412.25
