= 2003 UIAA Climbing World Championships =

- Location: Chamonix, France
- Date: 9 – 13 July 2003
- Competitors: 241 from 34 nations

The 2003 UIAA Climbing World Championships, the 7th edition, were held in Chamonix, France from 9 to 13 July 2003. It was organized by the Union Internationale des Associations d'Alpinisme (UIAA). The championships consisted of lead, speed, and bouldering events.

== Medalists ==
Event	Gold	Silver	Bronze
Men's Lead	Tomas Mrazek; Czech Republic	Patxi Usobiaga Lakunza; Spain	David Caude; France
Men's Bouldering	Christian Core; Italy	Jerome Meyer; France	Tomasz Oleksy; Poland
Men's Speed	Maksym Styenkovyy; Ukraine	Tomasz Oleksy; Poland	Alexander Peshekhonov; Russia
Women's Lead	Muriel Sarkany; Belgium	Emilie Pouget; France	Sandrine Levet; France
Women's Bouldering	Sandrine Levet; France	Nataliya Perlova; Ukraine	Fanny Rogeaux; France
Women's Speed	Olena Ryepko; Ukraine	Tatiana Ruyga; Russia	Valentina Yurina; Russia

== Lead ==
=== Men ===
Tomáš Mrázek clinched gold medal after climbing 2 meters higher than the rest of the field. Patxi Usobiaga Lakunza won silver medal by edging out David Caude who took bronze. Alexandre Chabot placed 5th.

Rank	Name	Nation	1/4 Final		1/2 Final	Final	Result
Rank	Name	Nation	R1	R2	1/2 Final	Final	Result
1st place, gold medalist(s)	Tomáš Mrázek	Czech Republic	Top		22.50-	23.55-	9500
2nd place, silver medalist(s)	Patxi Usobiaga Lakunza	Spain		Top	20.64-	21.29+	7600
3rd place, bronze medalist(s)	David Caude	France	Top		24.24+	21.29	6175
4	Christian Bindhammer	Germany	Top		20.64	15.40-	5225
5	Alexandre Chabot	France		Top	25.00-	14.48-	4845
6	Sylvain Millet	France	Top		23.76-	12.31-	4465
7	Ramón Julián Puigblanqué	Spain	Top		22.87-	10.81	4085
8	Evgeny Ovchinnikov	Russia		Top	20.64	10.81	3800

=== Women ===
Muriel Sarkany took the win by climbing 2 meter higher than her closest competition. Six climbers struggled on the same hold: touching, holding, or moving off it. In the end, Emilie Pouget claimed silver medal, ahead of her teammate Sandrine Levet who claimed bronze.

Rank	Name	Nation	1/4 Final	1/2 Final	Final	Result
1st place, gold medalist(s)	Muriel Sarkany	Belgium	Top	Top	24.60-	8400
2nd place, silver medalist(s)	Emilie Pouget	France	Top	18.15-	22.27+	6720
3rd place, bronze medalist(s)	Sandrine Levet	France	Top	Top	22.27	5460
4	Jenny Lavarda	Italy	Top	18.15	22.27-	4620
5	Alexandra Eyer	Switzerland	Top	18.15-	22.27-	4284
6	Caroline Ciavaldini	France	Top	16.94	22.27-	3948
7	Angela Eiter	Austria	Top	16.94-	22.27-	3612
8	Barbara Bacher	Austria	Top	17.42+	20.12	3360
9	Emily Harrington	United States	Top	16.94-	17.72-	3108
10	Olga Shalagina	Ukraine	Top	16.94-	7.26-	2856

== Bouldering ==
Bouldering scores were decided by number of tops, number of attempts to tops, number of zones, and number of attempts to zones in decreasing order of importance.

=== Men ===
Christian Core sent four boulder problems in the final round and won gold medal after edging out Jérôme Meyer by one less attempt. Tomasz Oleksy placed 3rd.

Rank	Name	Nation	Qualification					Final				Result
Rank	Name	Nation	Top	TA	Zone	ZA	Rank	Top	TA	Zone	ZA	Result
1st place, gold medalist(s)	Christian Core	Italy	1	1	6	9	11	4	7	5	7	7900
2nd place, silver medalist(s)	Jérôme Meyer	France	2	2	6	14	6	4	8	6	7	6320
3rd place, bronze medalist(s)	Tomasz Oleksy	Poland	3	3	6	7	4	3	3	5	8	5135
4	Mauro Calibani	Italy	4	9	5	10	3	3	4	5	7	4345
5	Kilian Fischhuber	Austria	2	5	4	8	10	3	4	4	5	4029
6	Serik Kazbekov	Ukraine	4	8	6	8	2	3	5	4	6	3713
7	Salavat Rakhmetov	Russia	4	6	6	8	1	3	6	6	11	3397
8	Akito Matsushima	Japan	3	4	5	8	5	3	7	4	8	3160
9	Stephane Julien	France	2	4	4	10	9	2	2	4	8	2923
10	Andrew Earl	Great Britain	2	2	3	4	7	2	3	4	9	2686
11	Alexander Meikl	Austria	1	1	4	9	12	2	8	4	14	2449
12	Georgos Progulakis	Italy	2	4	6	11	8	0	0	2	8	2212

=== Women ===
Sandrine Levet topped 5 boulder problems in the final round, securing a gold medal. Nataliya Perlova sent 3 problems and placed second, while Fanny Rogeaux sent 2 problems in two attempts claiming third place.

Rank	Name	Nation	Qualification					Final				Result
Rank	Name	Nation	Top	TA	Zone	ZA	Rank	Top	TA	Zone	ZA	Result
1st place, gold medalist(s)	Sandrine Levet	France	6	6	6	6	1	5	14	6	13	7600
2nd place, silver medalist(s)	Nataliya Perlova	Ukraine	5	8	6	8	12	3	6	4	4	6080
3rd place, bronze medalist(s)	Fanny Rogeaux	France	6	7	6	6	3	2	2	3	3	4940
4	Olga Bibik	Russia	5	6	6	6	10	2	3	5	6	4180
5	Juliette Danion	France	5	7	6	6	11	2	4	5	16	3876
6	Vera Kotasova-Kostruhova	Czech Republic	6	9	6	7	4	1	1	3	3	3572
7	Venera Chereshneva	Russia	6	6	6	6	1	1	1	3	4	3268
8	Olga Shalagina	Ukraine	6	9	6	7	4	1	2	4	7	3040
9	Myriam Motteau	France	6	9	6	8	7	1	2	3	5	2812
10	Yulia Abramchuk	Russia	6	9	6	7	4	1	2	2	4	2584
11	Stella Marchisio	Italy	5	5	6	6	9	1	3	2	7	2356
12	Corinne Theroux	France	6	10	6	9	8	1	6	4	11	2128

== Speed ==
=== Men ===
Maksym Styenkovvy took the win. Tomasz Oleksy placed second and Alexander Peshekhonov placed third.

Rank	Name	Nation	Qual.	1/2-Final	small Final	Final	Result
1st place, gold medalist(s)	Maksym Styenkovyy	Ukraine	28.81	25.97	21.55	21.31	5500
2nd place, silver medalist(s)	Tomasz Oleksy	Poland	32.15	25.96	24.31	25.71	4400
3rd place, bronze medalist(s)	Alexander Peshekhonov	Russia	32.74	26.96	22.11		3575
4	Oleksandr Salimov	Ukraine	35.20	28.74	27.43		3025
5	Alexei Gadeev	Russia	31.05	29.66			2805
6	Dmytro Konovalov	Ukraine	34.53	26.72			2585
7	Sergei Sinitcyn	Russia	28.29	31.74			2365
8	Iakov Soubbotine	Russia	26.64	27.01			2200
9	Yevgen Kryvosheytsev	Ukraine	29.01	27.19			2035
10	Csaba Komondi	Hungary	32.53	30.03			1870
11	Alexandre Chaoulsky	Russia	28.46	30.87			1705
12	Ivan Shyshkovskyy	Ukraine	40.25	34.18			1540
13	Salah Boulbahaiem	Belgium	48.95	42.32			1430
14	Mathieu Dutray	France	34.80	elim.			1320
14	Nicolas Januel	France	33.84	elim.			1320
14	Andrzej Mecherzynski-Wiktor	Poland	33.45	elim.			1320
17	C. M. Praveen	India	49.98				1008
18	Kyrylo Shevchenko	Ukraine	elim.				896

=== Women ===
Olena Ryepko took the win. Tatiana Ruyga placed second and Yurina Valentina third.

Rank	Name	Nation	Qual.	small Final	Final	Result
1st place, gold medalist(s)	Olena Ryepko	Ukraine	43.57	37.15	35.76	3300
2nd place, silver medalist(s)	Tatiana Ruyga	Russia	44.38	37.86	37.68	2640
3rd place, bronze medalist(s)	Valentina Yurina	Russia	43.72	42.25		2145
4	Olga Zakharova	Ukraine	43.09	38.86		1815
5	Mayya Piratinskaya	Russia	45.38			1683
6	Olga Bezhko	Ukraine	53.68			1551
7	Edyta Ropek	Poland	48.96			1419
8	Olena Ostapenko	Ukraine	51.14			1320
9	Svetlana Sutkina	Russia	53.83			1776
10	Agung Ethi Hendrawati	Indonesia	57.45			1632
11	Sabine Knabl	Austria	59.22			1488
12	Nataliya Perlova	Ukraine	60.54			1344
13	M. N. Vathsala	India	86.02			1248
14	Bangalore Subbarao Archana	India	elim.			1152
14	Anna Stenkovaya	Russia	elim.			1152
