= 2006 IFSC Climbing World Cup =

International sport climbing competition

- Location: Birmingham, England Veliko Tarnovo, Bulgaria; Puurs, Belgium; Rovereto, Italy; Dresden, Germany; Grindelwald, Switzerland; Fiera di Primiero, Italy; Hall, Austria; Chamonix, France; Qinghai, China; Val Daone, Italy; Singapore, Singapore; Kuala Lumpur, Malaysia; Marbella, Spain; Shanghai, China; Moscow, Russia; Penne, Italy Kranj, Slovenia
- Date: 17 March – 19 November 2006

Champions
- Men: (B) (France) Jérôme Meyer (L) (Spain) Patxi Usobiaga Lakunza (S) (Russia) Evgenii Vaitsekhovskii
- Women: (B) (Russia) Olga Bibik (L) (Austria) Angela Eiter (S) (Russia) Tatiana Ruyga

The 2006 IFSC Climbing World Cup was held in 18 locations. Bouldering competitions were held in 7 locations, lead in 10 locations, and speed in 8 locations. The season began on 17 March in Birmingham, England and concluded on 19 November in Kranj, Slovenia.

The top 3 in each competition received medals, and the overall winners were awarded trophies. At the end of the season an overall ranking was determined based upon points, which athletes were awarded for finishing in the top 30 of each individual event.

The winners for bouldering were Jérôme Meyer and Olga Bibik, for lead Patxi Usobiaga Lakunza and Angela Eiter, for speed Evgenii Vaitsekhovskii and Tatiana Ruyga, men and women respectively. The National Team for bouldering was France, for lead France, and for speed Russian Federation.

== Overview ==
No.	Location	D	G	Gold	Silver	Bronze
1	(United Kingdom) Birmingham; 17-19 March	B	M	(France) Jérôme Meyer	(Austria) Kilian Fischhuber	(Italy) Christian Core
1	(United Kingdom) Birmingham; 17-19 March	B	W	(Russia) Olga Bibik	(France) Emilie Abgrall	(France) Juliette Danion
2	(Bulgaria) Veliko Tarnovo; 21-22 April	B	M	(Austria) Kilian Fischhuber	(Switzerland) Matthias Müller	(France) Jérôme Meyer
2	(Bulgaria) Veliko Tarnovo; 21-22 April	B	W	(Russia) Olga Bibik	(Ukraine) Olga Shalagina	(Austria) Anna Stöhr
2	(Bulgaria) Veliko Tarnovo; 21-22 April	S	M	(Russia) Sergei Sinitcyn	(Russia) Alexander Peshkhonov	(Russia) Evgenii Vaitsekhovskii
2	(Bulgaria) Veliko Tarnovo; 21-22 April	S	W	(Russia) Anna Stenkovaya	(Russia) Tatiana Ruyga	(Ukraine) Olena Ryepko
3	(Belgium) Puurs; 28-29 April	L	M	(Italy) Flavio Crespi	(Austria) David Lama	(Czech Republic) Tomáš Mrázek
3	(Belgium) Puurs; 28-29 April	L	W	(Austria) Angela Eiter	(France) Caroline Ciavaldini	(France) Sandrine Levet
4	(Italy) Rovereto; 12-14 May	B	M	(France) Gérome Pouvreau	(France) Jérôme Meyer	(Czech Republic) Tomáš Mrázek
4	(Italy) Rovereto; 12-14 May	B	W	(France) Juliette Danion	(Russia) Olga Bibik	(Austria) Angela Eiter
5	(Germany) Dresden; 19-20 May	L	M	(Austria) David Lama	(France) Sylvain Millet	(Netherlands) Jorg Verhoeven
5	(Germany) Dresden; 19-20 May	L	W	(Austria) Angela Eiter	(France) Sandrine Levet	(Belgium) Muriel Sarkany
5	(Germany) Dresden; 19-20 May	S	M	(Russia) Evgenii Vaitsekhovskii	(Russia) Sergei Sinitcyn	(Russia) Alexander Peshekhonov
5	(Germany) Dresden; 19-20 May	S	W	(Ukraine) Olena Ryepko	(Russia) Tatiana Ruyga	(Russia) Anna Stenkovaya
6	(Switzerland) Grindelwald; 9-10 June	B	M	(France) Jérôme Meyer	(France) Loïc Gaidioz	(Austria) Kilian Fischhuber
6	(Switzerland) Grindelwald; 9-10 June	B	W	(Austria) Anna Stöhr	(France) Emilie Abgrall	(Sweden) Anja Hodann
7	(Italy) Fiera di Primiero; 16-17 June	B	M	(France) Jérôme Meyer	(Austria) Kilian Fischhuber	(Czech Republic) Tomáš Mrázek
7	(Italy) Fiera di Primiero; 16-17 June	B	W	(France) Juliette Danion	(Austria) Anna Stöhr	(Russia) Yulia Abramchuk
8	(Austria) Hall; 22-23 June	B	M	(Austria) David Lama	(France) Jérôme Meyer	(Austria) Kilian Fischhuber
8	(Austria) Hall; 22-23 June	B	W	(Russia) Olga Bibik	(Russia) Yulia Abramchuk	(France) Juliette Danion
9	(France) Chamonix; 12-13 July	L	M	(Spain) Eduard Marin Garcia	(Spain) Patxi Usobiaga Lakunza	(Switzerland) Cédric Lachat
9	(France) Chamonix; 12-13 July	L	W	(Austria) Angela Eiter	(France) Caroline Ciavaldini	(Slovenia) Natalija Gros
9	(France) Chamonix; 12-13 July	S	M	(Russia) Evgenii Vaitsekhovskii	(Russia) Alexander Peshekhonov	(Russia) Alexander Kosterin
9	(France) Chamonix; 12-13 July	S	W	(Russia) Tatiana Ruyga	(Russia) Kseniia Alekseeva	(Russia) Valentina Yurina
10	(China) Qinghai; 29-30 July	L	M	(Spain) Ramón Julián	(Netherlands) Jorg Verhoeven	(Czech Republic) Tomáš Mrázek
10	(China) Qinghai; 29-30 July	L	W	(Austria) Angela Eiter	(Slovenia) Mina Markovič	(Slovenia) Natalija Gros
11	(Italy) Val Daone; 29-30 July	S	M	(Russia) Sergei Sinitcyn	(Russia) Evgenii Vaitsekhovskii	(Russia) Alexander Peshekhonov
11	(Italy) Val Daone; 29-30 July	S	W	(Russia) Valentina Yurina	(Ukraine) Olena Ryepko	(Russia) Tatiana Ruyga
12	Singapore; 5-6 August	L	M	(Spain) Ramón Julián	(Spain) Patxi Usobiaga Lakunza	(Spain) Eduard Marin Garcia
12	Singapore; 5-6 August	L	W	(Austria) Angela Eiter	(Slovenia) Maja Stremfelj	(France) Caroline Ciavaldini
12	Singapore; 5-6 August	S	M	(Russia) Evgenii Vaitsekhovskii	(Indonesia) Erianto Rozak	(Indonesia) Galar Pandu Asmoro
12	Singapore; 5-6 August	S	W	(Indonesia) Evi Neliwati	(Venezuela) Francis Rodriguez	(Russia) Valentina Yurina
13	(Malaysia) Kuala Lumpur; 12-13 August	L	M	(Germany) Timo Preussler	(Switzerland) Daniel Winkler	(Spain) Patxi Usobiaga Lakunza
13	(Malaysia) Kuala Lumpur; 12-13 August	L	W	(Austria) Sandrine Levet	(Slovenia) Natalija Gros	(Austria) Angela Eiter
13	(Malaysia) Kuala Lumpur; 12-13 August	S	M	(Russia) Evgenii Vaitsekhovskii	(Indonesia) Erianto Rozak	(Singapore) Zaki Bin Ramli Muhd
13	(Malaysia) Kuala Lumpur; 12-13 August	S	W	(Russia) Valentina Yurina	(Russia) Tatiana Ruyga	(Indonesia) Evi Neliwati
14	(Spain) Marbella; 16-17 September	L	M	(Spain) Patxi Usobiaga Lakunza	(Italy) Flavio Crespi	(Netherlands) Jorg Verhoeven
14	(Spain) Marbella; 16-17 September	L	W	(Austria) Angela Eiter	(Slovenia) Natalija Gros	(Slovenia) Maja Stremfelj
15	(China) Shanghai; 2-3 October	L	M	(Czech Republic) Tomáš Mrázek	(Spain) Patxi Usobiaga Lakunza	(Spain) Eduard Marin Garcia
15	(China) Shanghai; 2-3 October	L	W	(France) Sandrine Levet	(France) Caroline Ciavaldini	(Slovenia) Mina Markovič
15	(China) Shanghai; 2-3 October	S	M	(Russia) Sergei Sinitcyn	(China) Hetai Ma	(China) Xiaojie Chen
15	(China) Shanghai; 2-3 October	S	W	(Hong Kong) Lai-sho Cheng	(Russia) Anna Stenkovaya	(Russia) Yana Malkova
16	(Russia) Moscow; 2-4 November	B	M	(Austria) Kilian Fischhuber	(Russia) Salavat Rakhmetov	(Poland) Tomasz Oleksy
16	(Russia) Moscow; 2-4 November	B	W	(Russia) Yulia Abramchuk	(Ukraine) Olga Shalagina	(Slovenia) Natalija Gros
16	(Russia) Moscow; 2-4 November	S	M	(Venezuela) Manuel Escobar	(Russia) Sergei Sinitcyn	(Ukraine) Oleksandr Salimov
16	(Russia) Moscow; 2-4 November	S	W	(Russia) Tatiana Ruyga	(Russia) Yana Malkova	(Russia) Valentina Yurina
17	(Italy) Penne; 11-12 November	L	M	(Austria) David Lama	(Spain) Patxi Usobiaga Lakunza	(Italy) Flavio Crespi
17	(Italy) Penne; 11-12 November	L	W	(Austria) Angela Eiter	(France) Caroline Ciavaldini	(France) Sandrine Levet
18	(Slovenia) Kranj; 18-19 November	L	M	(Austria) David Lama	(Switzerland) Cédric Lachat	(Netherlands) Jorg Verhoeven
18	(Slovenia) Kranj; 18-19 November	L	W	(Slovenia) Maja Stremfelj	(Austria) Angela Eiter	(Slovenia) Natalija Gros
OVERALL		B	M	(France) Jérôme Meyer; 525	(Austria) Kilian Fischhuber; 490	(France) Gérome Pouvreau; 306
OVERALL		B	W	(Russia) Olga Bibik; 472	(France) Juliette Danion; 409	(Austria) Anna Stöhr; 386
OVERALL		L	M	(Spain) Patxi Usobiaga Lakunza; 619	(Austria) David Lama; 548	(Italy) Flavio Crespi; 525
OVERALL		L	W	(Austria) Angela Eiter; 845	(France) Sandrine Levet; 639	(France) Caroline Ciavaldini; 565
OVERALL		S	M	(Russia) Evgenii Vaitsekhovskii; 585	(Russia) Sergei Sinitcyn; 515	(Russia) Alexander Peshekhonov; 424
OVERALL		S	W	(Russia) Tatiana Ruyga; 560	(Russia) Valentina Yurina; 501	(Russia) Anna Stenkovaya; 351
NATIONAL TEAMS		B	A	France; 2186	Austria; 1405	(Russia) Russian Federation; 1251
NATIONAL TEAMS		L	A	France; 2380	Austria; 1995	Slovenia; 1685
NATIONAL TEAMS		S	A	(Russia) Russian Federation; 2994	Venezuela; 1046	Ukraine; 710
