= Janja Garnbret in the Climbing World Cup =

Janja Garnbret first competed in the Climbing World Cup in 2015 in lead discipline at Chamonix, France where she won a silver medal. In 2016, she started competing in bouldering and then won her first gold medal in the World Cup in Chamonix lead event. In 2018, she started competing in speed. In 2019, she became the first person to clean sweep a bouldering season, winning six out of six events.

In lead, she missed finals twice in 2019 Chamonix and 2019 Kranj. She missed the podium four times in 2016 Imst, 2019 Chamonix, 2019 Kranj, and 2019 Xiamen.

In bouldering, she missed finals once in 2017 Vail. She missed the podium three times in 2016 Meiringen, 2017 Meiringen, and 2017 Vail.

In speed, she has advanced into finals twice in Salt Lake City and Villars, both in 2021.

== Climbing World Cup ==
Year	Date	Location	Rank	Discipline
2015	July 10	Chamonix, France	2nd	Lead
2015	July 31	Imst, Austria	2nd	Lead
2015	November 14	Kranj, Slovenia	3rd	Lead
2016	April 15	Meiringen, Switzerland	5th	Boulder
2016	May 20	Innsbruck, Austria	2nd	Boulder
2016	July 11	Chamonix, France	1st	Lead
2016	July 15	Villars, Switzerland	1st	Lead
2016	July 22	Briançon, France	1st	Lead
2016	August 19	Imst, Austria	5th	Lead
2016	August 26	Arco, Italy	3rd	Lead
2016	October 22	Xiamen, China	1st	Lead
2016	November 26	Kranj, Slovenia	3rd	Lead
2017	April 7	Meiringen, Switzerland	6th	Boulder
2017	April 22	Chongqing, China	1st	Boulder
2017	April 29	Nanjing, China	2nd	Boulder
2017	May 6	Hachioji, Japan	1st	Boulder
2017	June 9	Vail, United States	7th	Boulder
2017	July 7	Villars, Switzerland	1st	Lead
2017	July 12	Chamonix, France	1st	Lead
2017	July 28	Briançon, France	1st	Lead
2017	August 18	Munich, Germany	1st	Boulder
2017	August 25	Arco, Italy	3rd	Lead
2017	September 23	Edinburgh, United Kingdom	1st	Lead
2017	October 7	Wujiang, China	1st	Lead
2017	October 14	Xiamen, China	3rd	Lead
2017	November 11	Kranj, Slovenia	1st	Lead
2018	April 13	Meiringen, Switzerland	2nd	Boulder
2018	April 21	Moscow, Russia	1st	Boulder
2018	July 6	Villars, Switzerland	36th	Speed
2018	July 6	Villars, Switzerland	1st	Lead
2018	July 11	Chamonix, France	2nd	Lead
2018	July 20	Briançon, France	1st	Lead
2018	July 27	Arco, Italy	1st	Lead
2018	August 17	Munich, Germany	1st	Boulder
2018	September 29	Kranj, Slovenia	2nd	Lead
2018	October 20	Wujiang, China	24th	Speed
2018	October 20	Wujiang, China	1st	Lead
2018	October 27	Xiamen, China	32th	Speed
2018	October 27	Xiamen, China	2nd	Lead
2019	April 5	Meiringen, Switzerland	1st	Boulder
2019	April 12	Moscow, Russia	40th	Speed
2019	April 12	Moscow, Russia	1st	Boulder
2019	April 26	Chongqing, China	27th	Speed
2019	April 26	Chongqing, China	1st	Boulder
2019	May 3	Wujiang, China	51th	Speed
2019	May 3	Wujiang, China	1st	Boulder
2019	May 18	Munich, Germany	1st	Boulder
2019	June 8	Vail, United States	1st	Boulder
2019	July 3	Villars, Switzerland	27th	Speed
2019	July 3	Villars, Switzerland	1st	Lead
2019	July 10	Chamonix, France	30th	Speed
2019	July 10	Chamonix, France	9th	Lead
2019	July 18	Briançon, France	2nd	Lead
2019	September 29	Kranj, Slovenia	13th	Lead
2019	October 20	Xiamen, China	4th	Lead
2019	October 27	Inzai, Japan	2nd	Lead
2020	August 22	Briançon, France	2nd	Lead
2021	April 17	Meiringen, Switzerland	1st	Boulder
2021	May 30	Salt Lake City, United States	15th	Speed
2021	May 30	Salt Lake City, United States	2nd	Boulder
2021	June 23	Innsbruck, Austria	1st	Lead
2021	June 23	Innsbruck, Austria	1st	Boulder
2021	July 3	Villars, Switzerland	13th	Speed
2021	July 3	Villars, Switzerland	1st	Lead
2021	September 4	Kranj, Slovenia	1st	Lead
2022	April 9	Meiringen, Switzerland	1st	Boulder
2022	June 26	Innsbruck, Austria	1st	Lead
2022	July 2	Villars, Switzerland	1st	Lead
2022	July 10	Chamonix, France	1st	Lead
2022	July 23	Briançon, France	1st	Lead
2022	September 3	Koper, Slovenia	2nd	Lead
2022	September 11	Edinburgh, United Kingdom	2nd	Lead
2022	September 26	Jakarta, Indonesia	1st	Lead
2023	June 3	Prague, Czech Republic	2nd	Boulder
2023	June 15	Innsbruck, Austria	1st	Boulder
2023	June 18	Innsbruck, Austria	1st	Lead
2023	July 1	Villars, Switzerland	1st	Lead
2023	September 8	Koper, Slovenia	1st	Lead
2024	April 9	Keqiao, China	1st	Boulder
2024	April 13	Wujiang, China	1st	Lead
2024	June 29	Innsbruck, Austria	1st	Lead
2024	June 29	Innsbruck, Austria	1st	Boulder
2024	September 7	Koper, Slovenia	1st	Lead
2025	June 29	Innsbruck, Austria	1st	Lead
2025	June 29	Innsbruck, Austria	1st	Boulder
2025	September 6	Koper, Slovenia	1st	Lead
2026	May 3	Keqiao, China	2nd	Boulder
2026	May 10	Wujiang, China	2nd	Lead
2026	June 21	Innsbruck, Austria	1st	Lead
2026	September 5	Koper, Slovenia	1st	Lead
