= Bouldering at the 2017 IFSC Climbing World Cup =

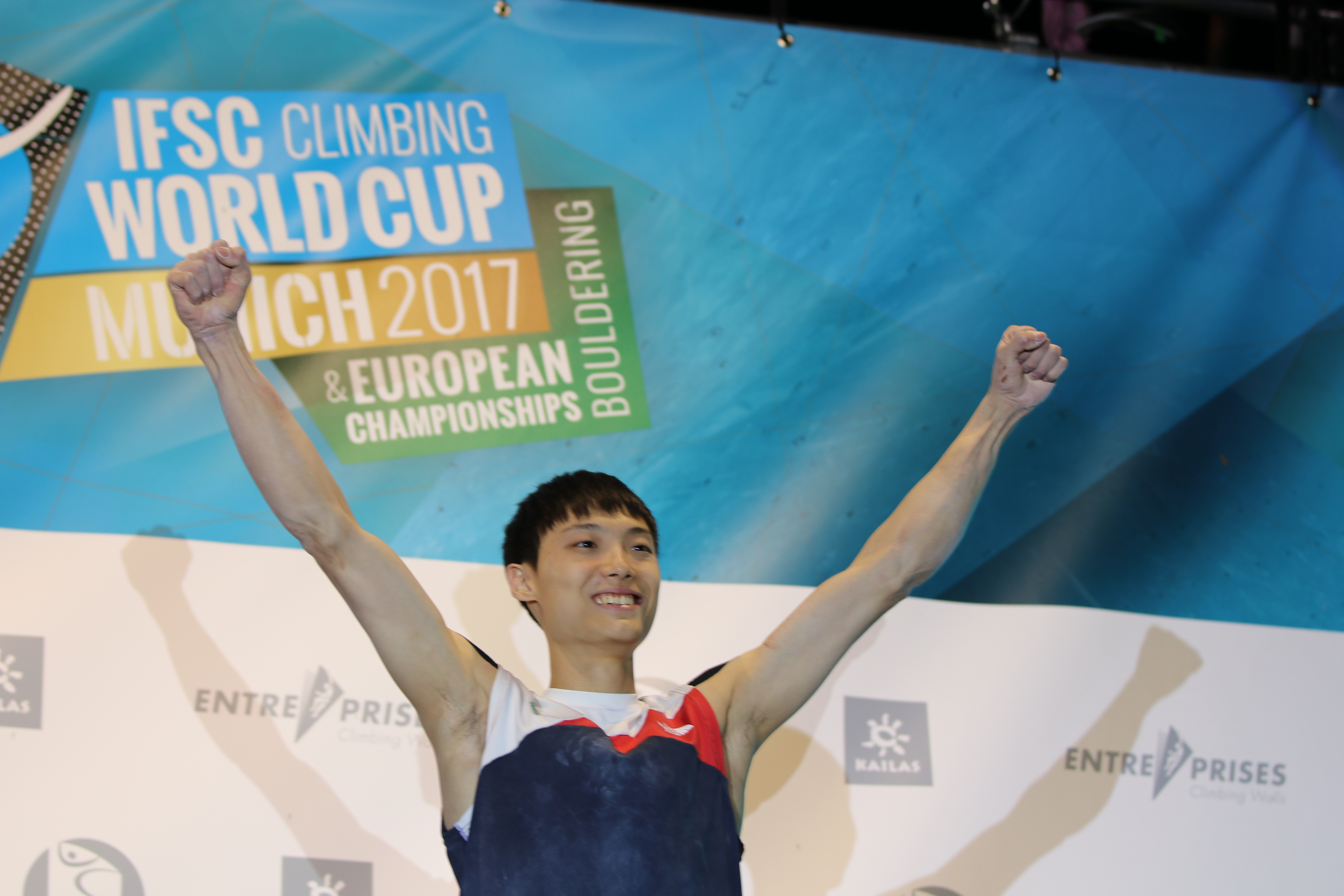
- Jongwon Chon KOR, winner of the World Cup 2017
- Location: Meiringen, Switzerland Chongqing, China; Nanjing, China; Hachioji, Japan; Vail, United States; Navi Mumbai, India Munich, Germany
- Dates: 7 April – 19 August 2017

Champions
- Men: (South Korea) Jongwon Chon
- Women: (United Kingdom) Shauna Coxsey

The 2017 season of the IFSC Climbing World Cup was the 19th season of the competition. Bouldering competitions were being held at seven stops of the IFSC Climbing World Cup. The bouldering season began on April 7 at the World Cup in Meiringen, and concluded on 19 August at the World Cup in Munich. At each stop a qualifying was held on the first day, and the semi-final and final rounds were conducted on the second day of the competition. The winners were awarded trophies, and the best three finishers received medals. At the end of the season an overall ranking was determined based upon points, which athletes were awarded for finishing in the top 30 of each individual event. Shauna Coxsey won the women's World Cup and Jongwon Chon won the men's World Cup.

== Changes from the previous season ==
For the 2017 season the IFSC changed the timing method for the finals of World Cup tournaments. Beginning in 2017 any attempt would only be considered successful if the athlete had reached the top and demonstrated control over it within the four minute time limit. (four minutes dead rule) Previously boulderers had four minutes per boulder, but a boulderer was allowed to finish their attempt if they had successfully started the boulder within the four minute limit. (four minutes plus rule)

== Streaming controversy ==
Before the start of the 2017 season the IFSC announced that they had signed a three-year contract with the streaming platform FloSports, which would have made the streams of climbing World Cups available only to paying customers instead of being freely accessible. This led to an online petition asking the IFSC to change their deal with FloSports, which was signed by more than 12,000 people, and an open letter by the Athletes' Commission. The Commission voiced their frustration over the way the IFSC had previously communicated with the community at large, and "asked the athletes to withdraw cooperation with the livestream media until changes are made". On the next day the IFSC apologized for having made a mistake, and announced that the deal with FloSports had not actually been signed yet despite the earlier press release, and would not be concluded.

== Overall ranking ==
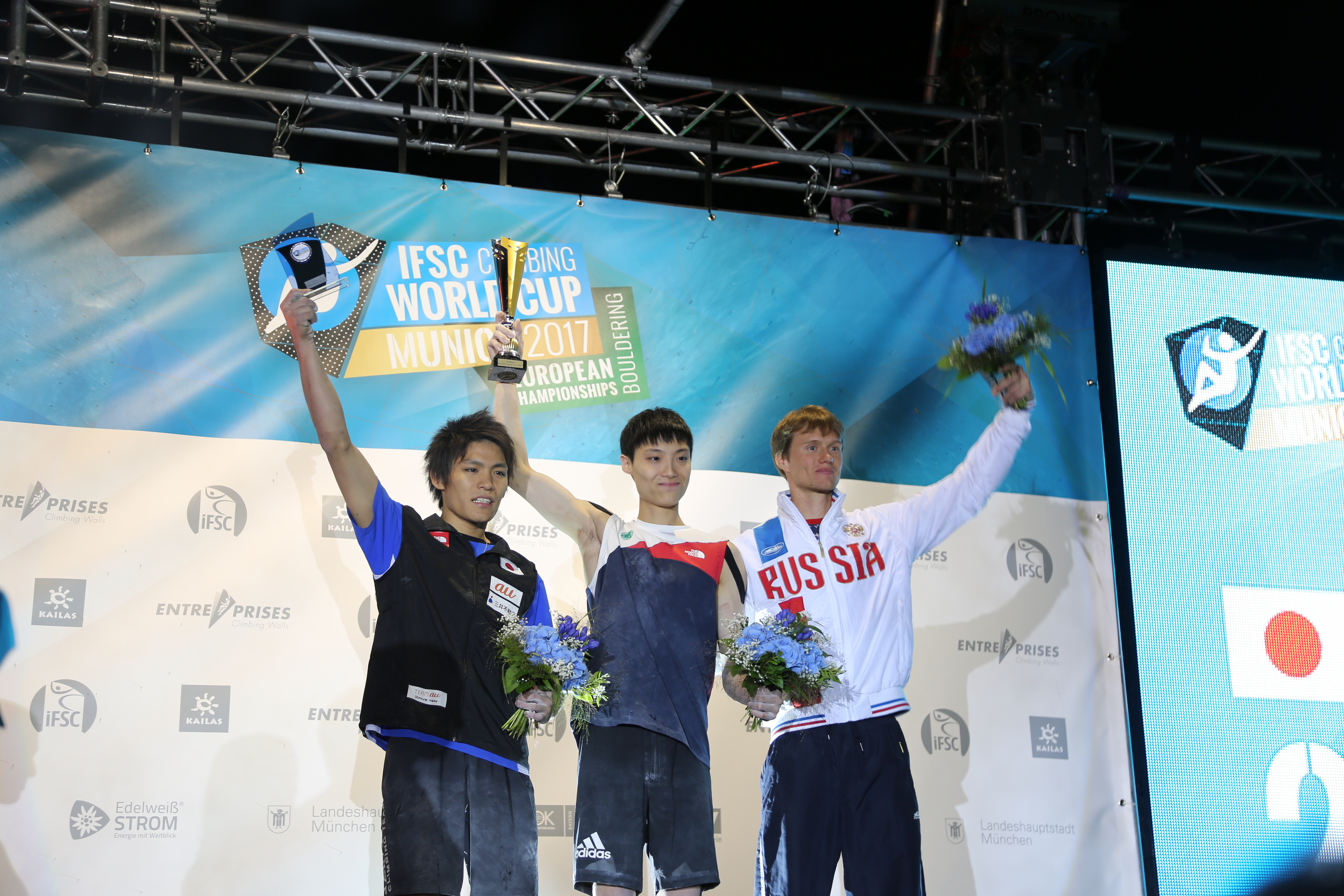
Winners 2017 Men: 1st Place: Jongwon Chon KOR, 2nd Place: Tomoa Narasaki JPN, 3rd Place: Alexey Rubtsov RUS

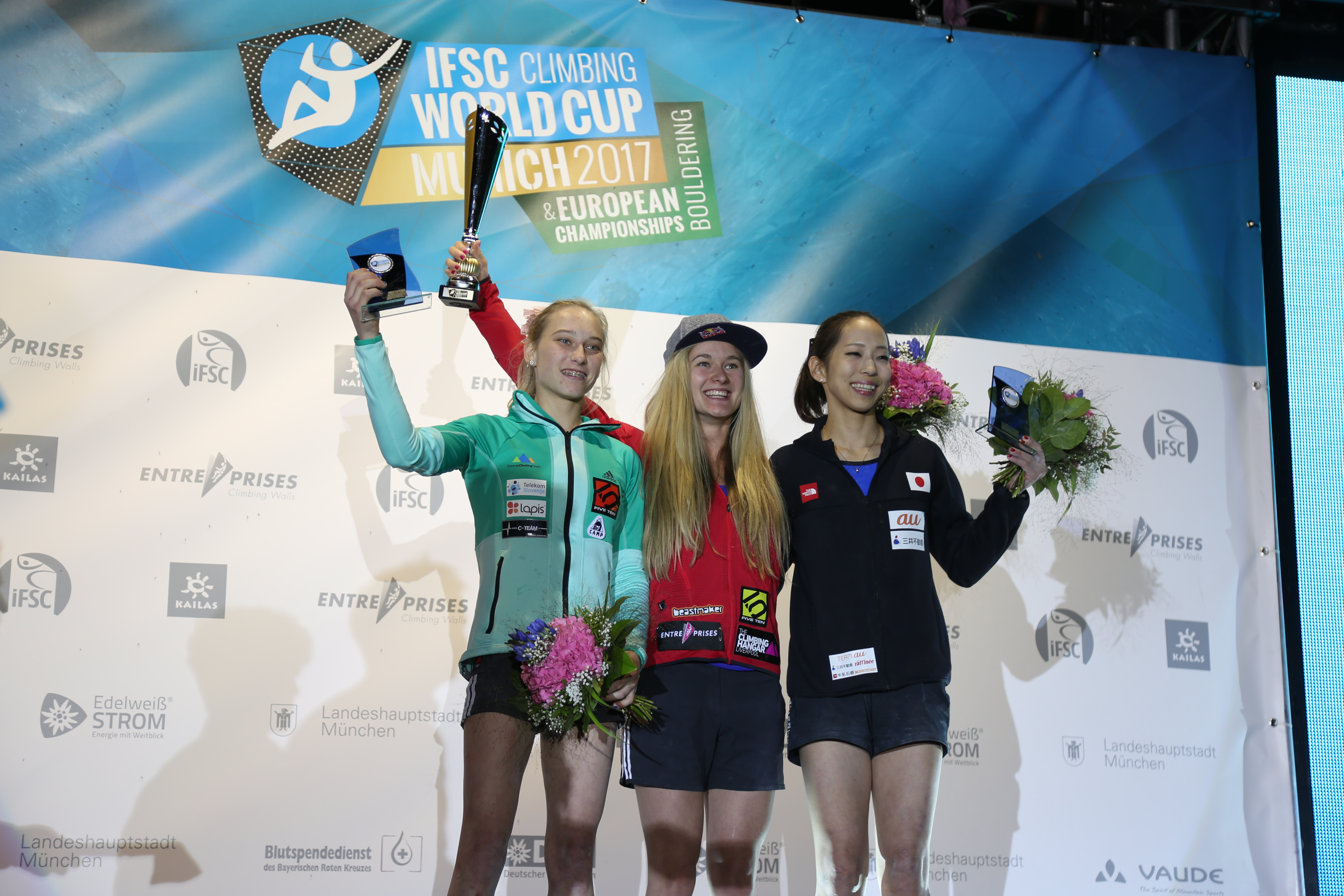
Winners 2017 Women: 1st Place: Shauna Coxsey GBR, 2nd Place: Janja Garnbret SLO, 3rd. Place: Akiyo Noguchi JPN

=== Men ===
Rank	Name	Points
1	(South Korea) Jongwon Chon	453
2	(Japan) Tomoa Narasaki	404
3	(Russia) Alexey Rubtsov	399
4	(Japan) Keita Watabe	372
5	(Japan) Kokoro Fujii	327
6	(Japan) Rei Sugimoto	278
7	(Germany) Jan Hojer	235
8	(Japan) Yoshiyuki Ogata	232
9	(Slovenia) Jernej Kruder	201
10	(Austria) Jakob Schubert	186

=== Women ===
Rank	Name	Points
1	(United Kingdom) Shauna Coxsey	560
2	(Slovenia) Janja Garnbret	470
3	(Japan) Akiyo Noguchi	381
4	(Japan) Miho Nonaka	377
5	(Switzerland) Petra Klingler	290
6	(Serbia) Staša Gejo	234
7	(Slovenia) Katja Kadic	227
8	(United Kingdom) Michaela Tracy	190
9	(France) Fanny Gibert	187
10	(Japan) Aya Onoe	165

=== National teams ===
Country names as used by the IFSC

Rank	Name	Points
1	Japan	2118
2	(United Kingdom) Great Britain	929
3	Slovenia	927
4	Germany	736
5	France	715
6	(South Korea) Republic of Korea	694
7	(Russia) Russian Federation	608
8	Austria	548
8	(Switzerland) Suisse	368
10	United States of America	340

== Meiringen, Switzerland (7–8 April) ==
=== Women ===
78 athletes attended the World Cup in Meiringen. Shauna Coxsey (4t10 4b8) won the competition in front of Katharina Saurwein (2t6 3b13).

Rank	Name	Score	Points
1	(United Kingdom) Shauna Coxsey	4t10 4b8	100
2	(Austria) Katharina Saurwein	2t6 3b13	80
3	(Japan) Miho Nonaka	1t2 3b6	65
4	(Serbia) Stasa Gejo	1t3 3b3	55
5	(Switzerland) Petra Klingler	1t3 2b3	51
6	(Slovenia) Janja Garnbret	0t 2b4	47

=== Men ===
115 athletes attended the World Cup in Meiringen. Kokoro Fujii (1t1 3b6) won the competition in front of Alexey Rubtsov (1t2 2b8).

Rank	Name	Score	Points
1	(Japan) Kokoro Fujii	1t1 3b6	100
2	(Russia) Alexey Rubtsov	1t2 2b8	80
3	(Japan) Keita Watabe	1t3 2b12	65
4	(Japan) Rei Sugimoto	1t5 3b7	55
5	(Slovenia) Jernej Kruder	0t 2b3	51
6	(Germany) David Firnenburg	0t 1b4	47

== Chongqing, China (22–23 April) ==
=== Women ===
42 athletes attended the World Cup in Chongqing. Janja Garnbret (4t11 4b7) won the competition in front of Shauna Coxsey (3t4 4b5).

Rank	Name	Score	Points
1	(Slovenia) Janja Garnbret	4t11 4b7	100
2	(United Kingdom) Shauna Coxsey	3t4 4b5	80
3	(Japan) Akiyo Noguchi	3t13 4b13	65
4	(Austria) Anna Stöhr	1t3 3b6	55
5	(Canada) Alannah Yip	1t3 3b8	51
6	(Serbia) Stasa Gejo	1t4 3b7	47

=== Men ===
77 athletes attended the World Cup in Chongqing. Jongwon Chon (4t6 4b5) won the competition in front of Tomoa Narasaki (2t2 3b3), who claimed the second place over Alexey Rubtsov by virtue of his better semi-final score.

Rank	Name	Score	Points
1	(South Korea) Jongwon Chon	4t6 4b5	100
2	(Japan) Tomoa Narasaki	2t2 3b3	80
3	(Russia) Alexey Rubtsov	2t2 3b3	65
4	(Japan) Keita Watabe	2t3 3b3	55
5	(Japan) Kai Harada	1t1 3b4	51
6	(France) Manuel Cornu	1t4 3b8	47

== Nanjing, China (29–30 April) ==
=== Women ===
50 athletes attended the World Cup in Nanjing. Shauna Coxsey (4t12 4b12) won her second World Cup competition of the season. At this point Coxsey and Nanjing runner-up Janja Garnbret (3t7 3b7) were the only two athletes to have made the final of all World Cups of the season.

Rank	Name	Score	Points
1	(United Kingdom) Shauna Coxsey	4t12 4b12	100
2	(Slovenia) Janja Garnbret	3t7 3b7	80
3	(Japan) Miho Nonaka	2t6 4b15	65
4	(South Korea) Jain Kim	1t5 2b11	55
5	(Japan) Aya Onoe	0t 3b8	51
6	(Japan) Mei Kotake	0t 1b3	47

=== Men ===
83 athletes attended the World Cup in Nanjing. Keita Watabe (4t9 4b8), the only athlete in all World Cup finals of the season at this point, won his first World Cup competition. Tomoa Narasaki (3t6 4b7) came in second.

Rank	Name	Score	Points
1	(Japan) Keita Watabe	4t9 4b8	100
2	(Japan) Tomoa Narasaki	3t6 4b7	80
3	(Slovenia) Jernej Kruder	2t5 3b5	65
4	(South Korea) Jongwon Chon	1t1 3b8	55
5	(France) Manuel Cornu	0t 3b3	51
6	(Japan) Rei Sugimoto	0t 3b4	47

== Hachioji, Japan (6–7 May) ==
=== Women ===
54 athletes attended the World Cup in Hachiōji, Tokyo. Janja Garnbret (4t5 4b4) won her second World Cup of the season. Akiyo Noguchi (4t9 4b9) won the silver medal.

Rank	Name	Score	Points
1	(Slovenia) Janja Garnbret	4t5 4b4	100
2	(Japan) Akiyo Noguchi	4t9 4b9	80
3	(Japan) Miho Nonaka	3t4 4b5	65
4	(United Kingdom) Shauna Coxsey	2t2 3b3	55
5	(France) Fanny Gibert	2t6 4b12	51
6	(Switzerland) Petra Klingler	1t1 3b5	47

=== Men ===
84 athletes attended the World Cup in Hachiōji. Alexey Rubtsov (3t8 4b13) won the World Cup in front of Tomoa Narasaki (3t9 4b19), who had his third consecutive silver medal finish.

Rank	Name	Score	Points
1	(Russia) Alexey Rubtsov	3t8 4b13	100
2	(Japan) Tomoa Narasaki	3t9 4b19	80
3	(Japan) Keita Watabe	2t5 3b6	65
4	(France) Mickael Mawem	1t1 4b8	55
5	(Austria) Jakob Schubert	1t2 3b5	51
6	(Japan) Taisei Ishimatsu	1t3 4b9	47

== Vail, United States (9–10 June) ==
=== Women ===
55 athletes attended the World Cup in Vail. Shauna Coxsey (4t5 4b4) won her third World Cup of the season. Akiyo Noguchi (4t9 4b9) won silver again. For the first and so far only time in her career Janja Garnbret did not reach the final.

Rank	Name	Score	Points
1	(United Kingdom) Shauna Coxsey	3t4 4b5	100
2	(Japan) Akiyo Noguchi	3t6 4b6	80
3	(Japan) Miho Nonaka	3t7 4b7	65
4	(United States) Alex Puccio	3t10 4b10	55
5	(Slovenia) Katja Kadic	1t3 2b4	51
6	(Switzerland) Petra Klingler	0t 1b2	47

=== Men ===
59 athletes attended the World Cup in Vail. Jongwon Chon (4t9 4b8) won the World Cup in front of Meichi Narasaki (3t6 3b5).

Rank	Name	Score	Points
1	(South Korea) Jongwon Chon	4t9 4b8	100
2	(Japan) Meichi Narasaki	3t6 3b5	80
3	(Japan) Yoshiyuki Ogata	3t11 4b7	65
4	(Russia) Alexey Rubtsov	2t5 3b8	55
5	(Japan) Kokoro Fujii	2t6 4b10	51
6	(Japan) Keita Watabe	1t3 1b3	47

== Navi Mumbai, India (24–25 June) ==
=== Women ===
41 athletes attended the World Cup in Navi Mumbai. Shauna Coxsey (4t11 4b8) won her fourth World Cup of the season, thereby securing the overall seasonal title. Miho Nonaka (3t7 4b11) came in second.

Rank	Name	Score	Points
1	(United Kingdom) Shauna Coxsey	4t11 4b8	100
2	(Japan) Miho Nonaka	3t7 4b11	80
3	(Japan) Akiyo Noguchi	2t3 3b7	65
4	(Switzerland) Petra Klingler	1t3 3b4	55
5	(Slovenia) Katja Kadic	0t 3b6	51
6	(Japan) Aya Onoe	0t 1b5	47

=== Men ===
58 athletes attended the World Cup in Navi Mumbai. Jongwon Chon (4t10 4b10) won the World Cup in front of Rei Sugimoto (3t6 3b4). This left Chon, Rubtsov, and Watabe with a chance to claim the overall title at the final World Cup of the season in Munich.

Rank	Name	Score	Points
1	(South Korea) Jongwon Chon	4t10 4b10	100
2	(Japan) Rei Sugimoto	3t6 3b4	80
3	(Russia) Alexey Rubtsov	3t9 3b8	65
4	(Japan) Kokoro Fujii	1t1 3b9	55
5	(Austria) Jakob Schubert	1t1 3b11	51
6	(Japan) Tomoa Narasaki	1t1 2b2	47

== Munich, Germany (18–19 August) ==
=== Women ===
114 athletes attended the World Cup in Munich. Janja Garnbret (3t10 3b6) won her third World Cup of the season, thereby securing the second place overall. Shauna Coxsey (2t2 2b2) won the Silver medal. She had locked up the overall title before the Munich competition already.

Rank	Name	Score	Points
1	(Slovenia) Janja Garnbret	3t10 3b6	100
2	(United Kingdom) Shauna Coxsey	2t2 2b2	80
3	(Japan) Akiyo Noguchi	1t1 2b4	65
4	(Serbia) Stasa Gejo	1t3 3b9	55
5	(United States) Alex Puccio	1t3 2b4	51
6	(Switzerland) Petra Klingler	0t 1b4	47

=== Men ===
166 athletes attended the World Cup in Munich. Germany's Jan Hojer (4t10 4b6) won the World Cup in front of Tomoa Narasaki (3t6 3b3). However, Narasaki's four second places over the course of the season were not enough to defend his overall title. The overall title went to Jongwon Chon, who had come in fourth in Munich.

Rank	Name	Score	Points
1	(Germany) Jan Hojer	4t10 4b6	100
2	(Japan) Tomoa Narasaki	3t6 3b3	80
3	(Japan) Taisei Ishimatsu	3t7 3b4	65
4	(South Korea) Jongwon Chon	2t3 3b4	55
5	(Japan) Yoshiyuki Ogata	2t4 3b4	51
6	(Japan) Kokoro Fujii	2t9 2b6	47
