= François Petit (climber) =

French rock climber

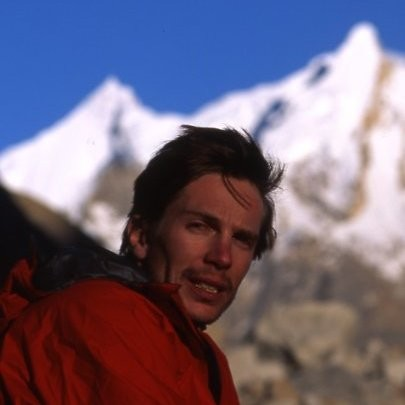

Personal information
- Nationality: French
- Born: March 27, 1975 (age 51) Albertville, France
- Occupation: Professional rock climber
- Height: 173 cm (5 ft 8 in)
- Weight: 58 kg (128 lb)

Climbing career
- Type of climber: Competition climbing; Sport climbing; Bouldering
- Retired from competition: 2004
- Known for: World Cup winner and World Champion
Medal record
IFSC Climbing World Cup
Silver medal – second place	1993	Lead
Winner	1995	Lead
Silver medal – second place	1996	Lead
Bronze medal – third place	1997	Lead
Winner	1999	Lead
Winner	1999	Combined
IFSC Climbing World Championships
Winner	1997	Lead
Bronze medal – third place	2001	Lead
- Updated on August 15, 2019

François Petit (French: [fʁɑ̃swa pəti]; born March 27, 1975) is a French professional rock climber who specialized in competition climbing, and who is known for winning the Lead Climbing World Championship in 1997 and the Lead Climbing World Cup in 1995 and 1999.

== Career ==
Born in Albertville, near the Vanoise National Park, Petit started climbing when he was a child, encouraged by his passionate parents. He shared his passion with his older brother and also the 1996 Lead Climbing World Cup winner, Arnaud Petit.

He sport climbed on routes up to 8c+ (5.14c), but primarily focused on indoor climbing. He retired from international competitions in 2004. Since 2010 he has been the trainer of the French bouldering team. He is also the director of Le Mur de Lyon, one of the largest indoor climbing gyms in France, located in Lyon.

== Rankings ==
=== Climbing World Cup ===
Discipline	1991	1992	1993	1994	1995	1996	1997	1998	1999	2000	2001	2002	2003	2004
Lead	25	7	2	5	1	2	3	6	1	-	13	5	33	39
Bouldering									5	23				

=== Climbing World Championships ===
Discipline	1993	1995	1997	1999	2001	2003
Lead	4	10	1	14	3	14

== Number of medals in the Climbing World Cup ==
=== Lead ===
Season	Gold	Silver	Bronze	Total
1992		1		1
1993	1	1	2	4
1994			1	1
1995	2		1	3
1996	1	1	1	3
1997			2	2
1999		1		1
2002		1		1
Total	4	5	7	16

== Rock climbing ==
=== Single-pitch routes ===
8c+/5.14c:

- Superplafond - Volx (FRA) - 1995 - bolted by Jean-Baptiste Tribout in 1994
- Le Bronx - Orgon (FRA) - 1994 - first ascent

=== Multi-pitch routes ===
- Bonington - Torres del Paine (PAT - January 2007
- Eternal Flame - Trango Towers (PAK) - July 20–22, 2005

== See also ==
- List of grade milestones in rock climbing
- History of rock climbing
- Rankings of most career IFSC gold medals
