= World Climbing Series =

Annual series of competitions

- Competition logo

Seasons
- 1989; 1990; 1991; 1992; 1993; 1994; 1995; 1996; 1997; 1998; 1999; 2000; 2001; 2002; 2003; 2004; 2005; 2006; 2007; 2008; 2009; 2010; 2011; 2012; 2013; 2014; 2015; 2016; 2017; 2018; 2019; 2020; 2021; 2022; 2023; 2024; 2025; 2026

Disciplines
- Lead; Bouldering; Speed

Most gold medals
- (Slovenia) Janja Garnbret (50)

Most titles
- (France) Sandrine Levet (10) (Slovenia) Janja Garnbret (10)

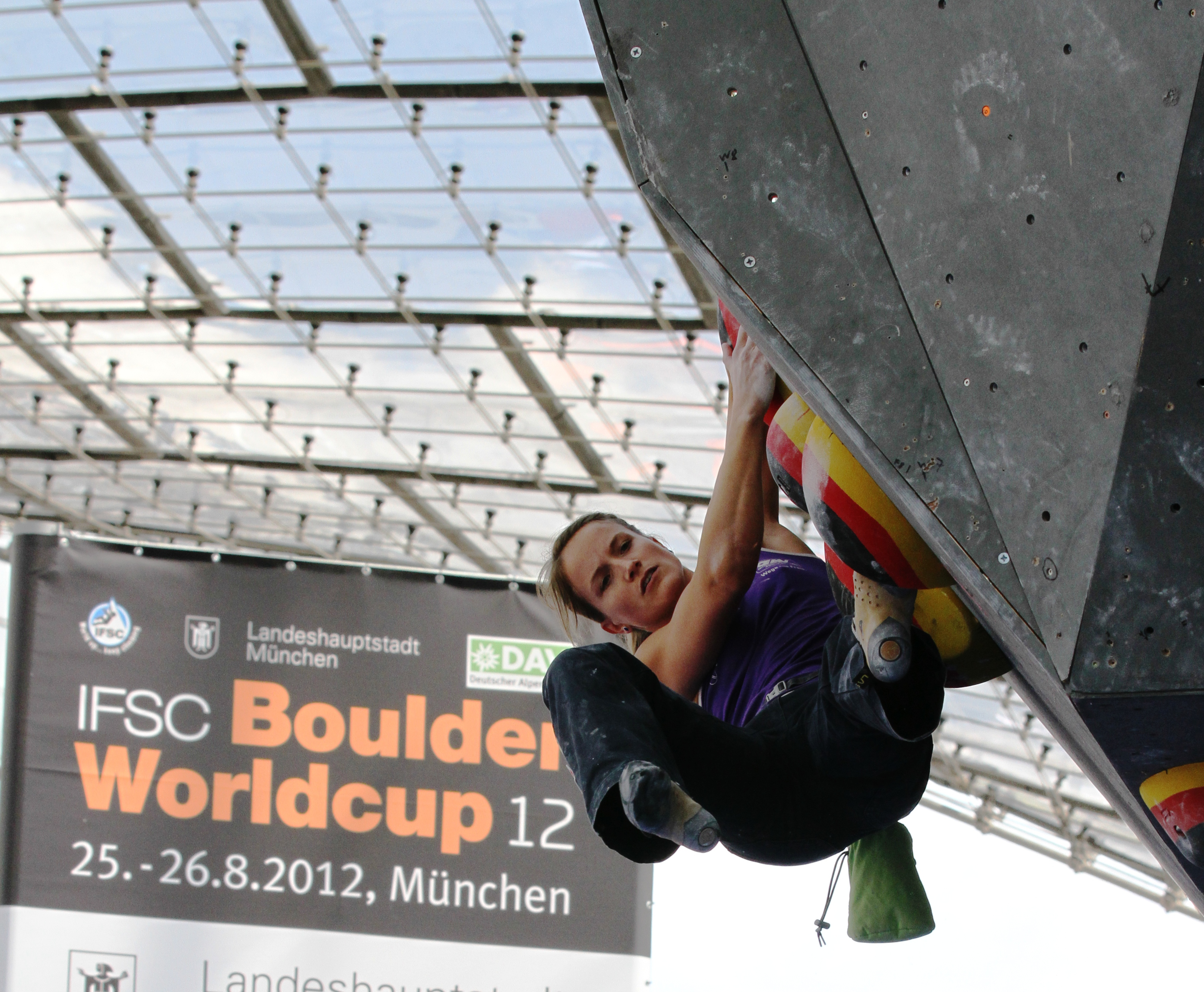
Anna Stöhr at the Boulder Worldcup 2012

World Climbing Series is a series of competition climbing events held during the year at various locations around the world, organized and regulated by World Climbing. At each event, the athletes compete in three disciplines: lead, bouldering, and speed. The number of events varies from year to year, and the winners for each discipline are decided by the points accumulated in the year.

Previously called the IFSC Climbing World Cup, the first season was held in 1989 and included only lead competition climbing events. Speed climbing was introduced in 1998, and bouldering in 1999. For 18 seasons, from 1989 to 2006, World Cups were held under the auspices of the International Council for Competition Climbing which was part of the UIAA; they were called UIAA Climbing World Cups. Since 2007, they have been held under the auspices of World Climbing, known as the International Federation of Sport Climbing (IFSC) until 2025.

The competition was renamed from IFSC World Cup to World Climbing Series in December 2025, as part of IFSC's rebranding to World Climbing.

== Athlete eligibility ==
Each country has a base quota of two athletes per gender per discipline for each event, plus a variable quota of up to four athletes based on the number of athletes ranked in the top 40 in a category. There is also a host country quota, with a maximum of six athletes per gender per discipline for each event. Before 2015, any athlete ranked in the top 10 was guaranteed a spot and did not count toward the quota.

== Scoring system ==
=== Individual disciplines ===
At the end of each World Climbing Series competition, a trophy is awarded to the winner, the top three athletes are awarded gold, bronze, and silver medals, and the top six athletes are awarded prize money. The top 80 competitors of individual World Cup competitions are eligible to accrue points. Tied competitors are awarded the average of the points allocated for the tied rank positions, rounded down to two decimal places.

| Ranking | 1 | 2 | 3 | 4 | 5 | 6 | 7 | 8 | 9 | 10 | 11 | 12 | 13 | 14 | 15 |
| Points | 1000 | 805 | 690 | 610 | 545 | 495 | 455 | 415 | 380 | 350 | 325 | 300 | 280 | 260 | 240 |

| Ranking | 16 | 17 | 18 | 19 | 20 | 21 | 22 | 23 | 24 | 25 | 26 | 27 | 28 | 29 | 30 |
| Points | 220 | 205 | 185 | 170 | 155 | 145 | 130 | 120 | 105 | 95 | 84 | 73 | 63 | 56 | 48 |

| Ranking | 31 | 32 | 33 | 34 | 35 | 36 | 37 | 38 | 39 | 40 | 41 | 42 | 43 | 44-45 | 46 |
| Points | 42 | 37 | 33 | 30 | 27 | 24 | 21 | 19 | 17 | 15 | 14 | 13 | 12 | 11 | 10 |

| Ranking | 47-48 | 49-50 | 51-53 | 54-56 | 57-59 | 60-63 | 64-68 | 69-74 | 75-80 |
| Points | 9 | 8 | 7 | 6 | 5 | 4 | 3 | 2 | 1 |

For each discipline (lead, bouldering and speed), the points awarded to each athlete are added together throughout the World Cup series in order to determine an overall World Climbing Series ranking. If an athlete participates in all competitions in a discipline, their worst result is discarded (provided that World Climbing organizes at least 6 competitions for that season). At the end of the season, the athlete with highest ranking in each discipline will be considered to be the overall winner of the World Climbing Series, and will be awarded a trophy. The athletes ranking second and third will be awarded a plate.

=== National team ranking ===
At the end of each competition, a national team ranking is determined, for each discipline, by adding the ranking points of the three highest ranked individual team members. For each discipline (lead, bouldering and speed), the points awarded to each team are added together throughout the World Climbing Series in order to determine the overall team ranking. If a team participates in all competitions in a discipline, its worst result is discarded (provided that World Climbing organizes at least six competitions for that season). At the end of the season, the team with highest overall ranking is awarded a trophy.

=== Combined ranking ===
Janja Garnbret's results in 2017
| Discipline | Overall score | Overall ranking |
|---|---|---|
| Lead | 665 | 1 |
| Bouldering | 470 | 2 |
| Speed | 0 | — |
| Combined | 1135 | 1 |

For each season, results obtained by each athlete across events and across disciplines (Lead, Bouldering and Speed) are considered to determine a combined ranking. At the end of the season, prizes are awarded to the top three athletes. The combined title was first introduced in 1998, together with the first speed event. Bouldering was introduced in the following year.

From 1998 to 2017, the combined score for each athlete was obtained by adding together the overall World Cup scores obtained by that athlete in at least two different disciplines. For instance, in 2017 Janja Garnbret won the combined title with a combined score of 1135 points, which was the sum of the overall scores she obtained in Lead and Bouldering. Since she competed in no Speed event, her score in that discipline was zero.

Jakob Schubert's results in 2018
| Discipline | Selected event | Rankings | |
| Discipline | Selected event | General | Relative |
|---|---|---|---|
| Lead | Villars | 1 | 1 |
| Lead | Arco | 1 | 1 |
| Bouldering | Meringen | 4 | 3 |
| Bouldering | Munich | 3 | 2 |
| Speed | Wujiang | 27 | 2 |
| Speed | Xiamen | 26 | 4 |
| Product of relative rankings | | | 48 |

Since 2018, more complex rules were applied to determine the combined score. Only athletes participating in at least two competitions in each discipline (i.e. 2 in Bouldering, 2 in Lead, and 2 in Speed) were eligible for the combined title. For each World Cup event, rankings were adjusted by discarding non-eligible athletes. Since they were relative to a selected subset of athletes (the eligible ones), these adjusted rankings were called relative rankings, as opposed to the general rankings applied to the whole set of participants. If an eligible athlete participated in more than two competitions in a discipline, only the best two results in that discipline were considered. For each eligible athlete, the relative rankings obtained in the selected six events were multiplied together to determine a combined score. Athletes were ranked according to their combined score in ascending order. Namely, the athlete with the lowest score was awarded the combined title. For instance, in 2018 Jakob Schubert won the Combined World Cup with a score of 48 points, determined as shown in the table.

In 2019, individual combined events were introduced in the World Cup series, where participants are required to compete in all disciplines (Bouldering, Lead and Speed) and medals are awarded based on their combined results. Nevertheless, at the end of the season, combined World Cup rankings will be determined as well, with the same method applied in 2018, based on results across disciplines obtained by each athlete in six selected events.

== Men's results ==
Complete rankings starting from the 1991 season are available on the IFSC web site.

=== Lead ===
| Year | Winner | Second | Third |
|---|---|---|---|
| 1989 | (United Kingdom) Simon Nadin | (France) Didier Raboutou | (United Kingdom) Jerry Moffatt |
| 1990 | (France) François Legrand | (France) Jacky Godoffe | (United States) Jim Karn |
| 1991 | (France) François Legrand (2) | (France) François Lombard | (Japan) Yuji Hirayama |
| 1992 | (France) François Legrand (3) | (Italy) Luca Zardini | (France) Jean-Baptiste Tribout |
| 1993 | (France) François Legrand (4) | (France) François Petit | (Japan) Yuji Hirayama |
| 1994 | (France) François Lombard | (France) François Legrand | (France) Jean-Baptiste Tribout |
| 1995 | (France) François Petit | (France) François Legrand | (France) Arnaud Petit |
| 1996 | (France) Arnaud Petit | (France) François Petit | (Italy) Cristian Brenna |
| 1997 | (France) François Legrand (5) | (France) Arnaud Petit | (France) François Petit |
| 1998 | (Japan) Yuji Hirayama | (Italy) Cristian Brenna | (Ukraine) Yevgen Kryvosheytsev |
| 1999 | (France) François Petit (2) | (France) François Legrand | (Germany) Andreas Bindhammer |
| 2000 | (Japan) Yuji Hirayama (2) | (France) Alexandre Chabot | (Italy) Cristian Brenna |
| 2001 | (France) Alexandre Chabot | (France) Gérôme Pouvreau | (Czech Republic) Tomáš Mrázek |
| 2002 | (France) Alexandre Chabot (2) | (Czech Republic) Tomáš Mrázek | (France) Gérôme Pouvreau |
| 2003 | (France) Alexandre Chabot (3) | (Spain) Ramón Julián | (France) François Auclair |
| 2004 | (Czech Republic) Tomáš Mrázek | (France) Alexandre Chabot | (Italy) Flavio Crespi |
| 2005 | (Italy) Flavio Crespi | (Netherlands) Jorg Verhoeven | (Switzerland) Cédric Lachat |
| 2006 | (Spain) Patxi Usobiaga | (Austria) David Lama | (Italy) Flavio Crespi (Czech Republic) Tomáš Mrázek |
| 2007 | (Spain) Patxi Usobiaga (2) | (Spain) Ramón Julián | (Czech Republic) Tomáš Mrázek |
| 2008 | (Netherlands) Jorg Verhoeven | (Czech Republic) Tomáš Mrázek | (Spain) Ramón Julián |
| 2009 | (Czech Republic) Adam Ondra | (Spain) Patxi Usobiaga | (Japan) Sachi Amma |
| 2010 | (Spain) Ramón Julián | (Austria) Jakob Schubert | (Czech Republic) Adam Ondra |
| 2011 | (Austria) Jakob Schubert | (Spain) Ramón Julián | (Japan) Sachi Amma |
| 2012 | (Japan) Sachi Amma | (Spain) Ramón Julián | (Austria) Jakob Schubert |
| 2013 | (Japan) Sachi Amma (2) | (Austria) Jakob Schubert | (Spain) Ramón Julián |
| 2014 | (Austria) Jakob Schubert (2) | (Canada) Sean McColl | (Czech Republic) Adam Ondra |
| 2015 | (Czech Republic) Adam Ondra (2) | (France) Gautier Supper | (Austria) Jakob Schubert |
| 2016 | (Slovenia) Domen Škofic | (Austria) Jakob Schubert | (France) Romain Desgranges |
| 2017 | (France) Romain Desgranges | (Italy) Stefano Ghisolfi | (Japan) Keiichiro Korenaga |
| 2018 | (Austria) Jakob Schubert (3) | (Italy) Stefano Ghisolfi | (France) Romain Desgranges (Slovenia) Domen Škofic |
| 2019 | (Czech Republic) Adam Ondra (3) | (Spain) Alberto Ginés López | (Canada) Sean McColl |
| 2021 | (Italy) Stefano Ghisolfi | (United States) Sean Bailey | (Japan) Masahiro Higuchi |
| 2022 | (Slovenia) Luka Potočar | (Japan) Taisei Homma | (United States) Jesse Grupper |
| 2023 | (Japan) Sorato Anraku | (Germany) Alexander Megos | (Japan) Taisei Homma |
| 2024 | (United Kingdom) Toby Roberts | (Japan) Shion Omata | (Japan) Sorato Anraku |
| 2025 | (Spain) Alberto Ginés López | (Japan) Sorato Anraku | (Japan) Satone Yoshida |
| 2026 | (Japan) Neo Suzuki | (Indonesia) Putra Tri Ramadani | (Spain) Alberto Ginés López |

=== Bouldering ===
| Year | Winner | Second | Third |
|---|---|---|---|
| 1999 | (Italy) Christian Core | (Ukraine) Serik Kazbekov | (France) Jérôme Meyer |
| 2000 | (Spain) Pedro Pons | (Russia) Salavat Rakhmetov | (France) Daniel Du Lac |
| 2001 | (France) Jérôme Meyer | (Italy) Mauro Calibani | (Spain) Daniel Andrada |
| 2002 | (Italy) Christian Core (2) (France) Jérôme Meyer (2) (United Kingdom) Malcolm Smith | — | — |
| 2003 | (France) Jérôme Meyer (3) | (Russia) Salavat Rakhmetov | (France) Daniel Du Lac |
| 2004 | (France) Daniel Du Lac | (Austria) Kilian Fischhuber | (France) Jérôme Meyer |
| 2005 | (Austria) Kilian Fischhuber | (France) Jérôme Meyer | (France) Daniel Du Lac |
| 2006 | (France) Jérôme Meyer (4) | (Austria) Kilian Fischhuber | (France) Gérôme Pouvreau |
| 2007 | (Austria) Kilian Fischhuber (2) | (Russia) Dmitri Sarafutdinov | (France) Stéphane Julien |
| 2008 | (Austria) Kilian Fischhuber (3) | (Austria) David Lama | (Russia) Dmitri Sarafutdinov |
| 2009 | (Austria) Kilian Fischhuber (4) | (Russia) Rustam Gelmanov | (Italy) Gabriele Moroni |
| 2010 | (Czech Republic) Adam Ondra | (Austria) Kilian Fischhuber | (Japan) Tsukuru Hori |
| 2011 | (Austria) Kilian Fischhuber (5) | (Russia) Dmitri Sarafutdinov | (France) Guillaume Glairon Mondet |
| 2012 | (Russia) Rustam Gelmanov | (Austria) Kilian Fischhuber | (Austria) Jakob Schubert |
| 2013 | (Russia) Dmitri Sarafutdinov | (Austria) Jakob Schubert | (Canada) Sean McColl |
| 2014 | (Germany) Jan Hojer | (Russia) Dmitri Sarafutdinov | (France) Guillaume Glairon Mondet |
| 2015 | (South Korea) Chon Jong-won | (Germany) Jan Hojer | (Czech Republic) Adam Ondra |
| 2016 | (Japan) Tomoa Narasaki | (Japan) Kokoro Fujii | (Russia) Alexey Rubtsov |
| 2017 | (South Korea) Chon Jong-won (2) | (Japan) Tomoa Narasaki | (Russia) Alexey Rubtsov |
| 2018 | (Slovenia) Jernej Kruder | (Japan) Tomoa Narasaki | (Japan) Rei Sugimoto |
| 2019 | (Japan) Tomoa Narasaki (2) | (Czech Republic) Adam Ondra | (Japan) Yoshiyuki Ogata |
| 2021 | (Japan) Yoshiyuki Ogata | (Japan) Kokoro Fujii | (Czech Republic) Adam Ondra |
| 2022 | (Japan) Yoshiyuki Ogata (2) | (Japan) Tomoa Narasaki | (Japan) Kokoro Fujii |
| 2023 | (Japan) Sorato Anraku | (South Korea) Lee Do-hyun | (Japan) Tomoa Narasaki |
| 2024 | (Japan) Sorato Anraku (2) | (Japan) Meichi Narasaki | (Japan) Tomoa Narasaki |
| 2025 | (Japan) Sorato Anraku (3) | (France) Mejdi Schalck | (Japan) Sohta Amagasa |
| 2026 | (Japan) Sorato Anraku (4) | (South Korea) Lee Do-hyun | (France) Mejdi Schalck |

=== Speed ===
| Year | Winner | Second | Third |
|---|---|---|---|
| 1998 | (Ukraine) Andrey Vedenmeer | (Russia) Vladimir Netsvetaev | (Russia) Alexey Kozlov |
| 1999 | (Poland) Tomasz Oleksy | (Russia) Vladislav Baranov | (Ukraine) Vladimir Zakharov |
| 2000 | (Ukraine) Andrey Vedenmeer (2) | (Russia) Iakov Soubbotine | (Ukraine) Vladimir Zakharov |
| 2001 | (Ukraine) Maksym Styenkovyy | (Russia) Alexander Chaoulsky | (Russia) Alexander Peshekhonov |
| 2002 | (Russia) Alexander Peshekhonov | (Ukraine) Maksym Styenkovyy | (Russia) Sergey Sinitsyn |
| 2003 | (Poland) Tomasz Oleksy (2) | (Russia) Alexander Peshekhonov | (Russia) Iakov Soubbotine |
| 2004 | (Russia) Sergey Sinitsyn | (Russia) Evgeny Vaitcekhovsky | (Russia) Alexander Peshekhonov |
| 2005 | (Russia) Evgeny Vaitcekhovsky | (Russia) Sergey Sinitsyn | (Poland) Tomasz Oleksy |
| 2006 | (Russia) Evgeny Vaitcekhovsky (2) | (Russia) Sergey Sinitsyn | (Russia) Alexander Peshekhonov |
| 2007 | (Russia) Sergey Sinitsyn (2) | (Russia) Evgeny Vaitcekhovsky | (Russia) Alexander Kosterin |
| 2008 | (Russia) Evgeny Vaitcekhovsky (3) | (Russia) Sergey Sinitsyn | (China) Zhong Qixin |
| 2009 | (Russia) Sergey Sinitsyn (3) | (Russia) Sergey Abdrakhmanov | (Russia) Evgeny Vaitcekhovsky |
| 2010 | (Russia) Stanislav Kokorin | (Russia) Evgeny Vaitcekhovsky | (Czech Republic) Libor Hroza |
| 2011 | (Poland) Łukasz Świrk | (Russia) Sergey Sinitsyn | (Russia) Sergey Abdrakhmanov |
| 2012 | (Russia) Stanislav Kokorin (2) | (Ukraine) Danyil Boldyrev | (Ukraine) Yaroslav Gontaryk |
| 2013 | (Russia) Stanislav Kokorin (3) | (Czech Republic) Libor Hroza | (China) Zhong Qixin |
| 2014 | (Ukraine) Danyil Boldyrev | (Czech Republic) Libor Hroza | (Poland) Marcin Dzieński |
| 2015 | (China) Zhong Qixin | (Czech Republic) Libor Hroza | (Ukraine) Danyil Boldyrev |
| 2016 | (Poland) Marcin Dzieński | (Iran) Reza Alipour | (Russia) Aleksander Shikov |
| 2017 | (Russia) Vladislav Deulin | (Iran) Reza Alipour | (Italy) Ludovico Fossali |
| 2018 | (France) Bassa Mawem | (Ukraine) Danyil Boldyrev | (Russia) Dmitry Timofeev |
| 2019 | (France) Bassa Mawem (2) | (Russia) Vladislav Deulin | (Indonesia) Alfian Muhammad |
| 2021 | (Indonesia) Veddriq Leonardo | (Indonesia) Kiromal Katibin | (Poland) Marcin Dzieński |
| 2022 | (Indonesia) Veddriq Leonardo (2) | (Indonesia) Kiromal Katibin | (China) Long Jinbao |
| 2023 | (Indonesia) Veddriq Leonardo (3) | (China) Wu Peng | (United States) Samuel Watson |
| 2024 | (United States) Samuel Watson | (Italy) Matteo Zurloni | (China) Xinshang Wang |
| 2025 | (Indonesia) Kiromal Katibin | (United States) Samuel Watson | (Japan) Ryo Omasa |
| 2026 | (China) Zhao Yicheng | (Japan) Ryo Omasa | (Indonesia) Raharjati Nursamsa |

=== Combined ===
| Year | Winner | Second | Third |
|---|---|---|---|
| 1998 | (Ukraine) Yevgen Kryvosheytsev | (Poland) Tomasz Oleksy | — |
| 1999 | (France) François Petit | (Spain) Daniel Andrada | (Poland) Tomasz Oleksy |
| 2000 | (France) Alexandre Chabot | (Russia) Salavat Rakhmetov | (Ukraine) Serik Kazbekov |
| 2001 | (France) Alexandre Chabot (2) | (Ukraine) Serik Kazbekov | (Austria) Kilian Fischhuber |
| 2002 | (Ukraine) Maksym Styenkovyy | (Ukraine) Serik Kazbekov | (Austria) Kilian Fischhuber |
| 2003 | (Poland) Tomasz Oleksy | (Russia) Evgeny Ovchinnikov | (Ukraine) Serik Kazbekov (Switzerland) Cédric Lachat |
| 2004 | (Austria) Kilian Fischhuber | (Italy) Flavio Crespi | (France) Gérôme Pouvreau |
| 2005 | (Poland) Tomasz Oleksy (2) | (Austria) Kilian Fischhuber | (Russia) Dmitri Sarafutdinov |
| 2006 | (Czech Republic) Tomáš Mrázek | (Austria) David Lama | (Austria) Kilian Fischhuber |
| 2007 | (Netherlands) Jorg Verhoeven | (Czech Republic) Tomáš Mrázek | (Austria) Kilian Fischhuber |
| 2008 | (Austria) David Lama | (Netherlands) Jorg Verhoeven | (Czech Republic) Tomáš Mrázek |
| 2009 | (Czech Republic) Adam Ondra | (Japan) Sachi Amma | (Slovenia) Klemen Bečan |
| 2010 | (Czech Republic) Adam Ondra (2) | (Austria) Jakob Schubert | (Japan) Sachi Amma |
| 2011 | (Austria) Jakob Schubert | (Canada) Sean McColl | (Slovenia) Klemen Bečan |
| 2012 | (Austria) Jakob Schubert (2) | (Canada) Sean McColl | (Japan) Sachi Amma |
| 2013 | (Austria) Jakob Schubert (3) | (Canada) Sean McColl | (Japan) Sachi Amma |
| 2014 | (Canada) Sean McColl | (Czech Republic) Adam Ondra | (Slovenia) Domen Škofic |
| 2015 | (Czech Republic) Adam Ondra (3) | (Canada) Sean McColl | (Slovenia) Domen Škofic |
| 2016 | (Canada) Sean McColl (2) | (Austria) Jakob Schubert | (Japan) Kokoro Fujii |
| 2017 | (Japan) Tomoa Narasaki | (South Korea) Chon Jong-won | (Japan) Kokoro Fujii |
| 2018 | (Austria) Jakob Schubert (4) | (Japan) Tomoa Narasaki | (Japan) Kokoro Fujii |
| 2019 | (Japan) Tomoa Narasaki (2) | (Czech Republic) Adam Ondra | (Austria) Jakob Schubert |

== Women's results ==
Complete rankings starting from the 1991 season are available on the IFSC web site.

=== Lead ===
| Year | Winner | Second | Third |
|---|---|---|---|
| 1989 | (France) Nanette Raybaud | (Italy) Luisa Iovane | (United States) Robyn Erbesfield |
| 1990 | (France) Isabelle Patissier (United States) Lynn Hill | — | (France) Nanette Raybaud |
| 1991 | (France) Isabelle Patissier (2) | (Switzerland) Susi Good | (United States) Robyn Erbesfield |
| 1992 | (United States) Robyn Erbesfield | (France) Isabelle Patissier | (United States) Lynn Hill |
| 1993 | (United States) Robyn Erbesfield (2) | (Switzerland) Susi Good | (United States) Elena Ovtchinnikova |
| 1994 | (United States) Robyn Erbesfield (3) | (France) Isabelle Patissier | (France) Natalie Richer |
| 1995 | (United States) Robyn Erbesfield (4) | (France) Laurence Guyon | (France) Liv Sansoz |
| 1996 | (France) Liv Sansoz | (France) Laurence Guyon | (France) Stéphanie Bodet |
| 1997 | (Belgium) Muriel Sarkany | (France) Liv Sansoz | (France) Stéphanie Bodet |
| 1998 | (France) Liv Sansoz (2) | (Belgium) Muriel Sarkany | (France) Stéphanie Bodet |
| 1999 | (Belgium) Muriel Sarkany (2) | (France) Liv Sansoz | (Slovenia) Martina Čufar |
| 2000 | (France) Liv Sansoz (3) | (Belgium) Muriel Sarkany | (France) Stéphanie Bodet |
| 2001 | (Belgium) Muriel Sarkany (3) | (Slovenia) Martina Čufar | (France) Sandrine Levet |
| 2002 | (Belgium) Muriel Sarkany (4) | (France) Sandrine Levet | (Slovenia) Martina Čufar |
| 2003 | (Belgium) Muriel Sarkany (5) | (France) Sandrine Levet | (Austria) Angela Eiter |
| 2004 | (Austria) Angela Eiter | (Belgium) Muriel Sarkany | (Switzerland) Alexandra Eyer (Slovenia) Natalija Gros |
| 2005 | (Austria) Angela Eiter (2) | (Slovenia) Maja Vidmar | (France) Caroline Ciavaldini |
| 2006 | (Austria) Angela Eiter (3) | (France) Sandrine Levet | (France) Caroline Ciavaldini |
| 2007 | (Slovenia) Maja Vidmar | (Austria) Angela Eiter | (Belgium) Muriel Sarkany |
| 2008 | (Austria) Johanna Ernst | (Slovenia) Maja Vidmar | (Slovenia) Mina Markovič |
| 2009 | (Austria) Johanna Ernst (2) | (South Korea) Jain Kim | (Slovenia) Maja Vidmar |
| 2010 | (South Korea) Jain Kim | (Slovenia) Mina Markovič | (Austria) Angela Eiter |
| 2011 | (Slovenia) Mina Markovič | (South Korea) Jain Kim | (Slovenia) Maja Vidmar |
| 2012 | (Slovenia) Mina Markovič (2) | (South Korea) Jain Kim | (Austria) Johanna Ernst |
| 2013 | (South Korea) Jain Kim (2) | (Slovenia) Mina Markovič | (Japan) Momoka Oda |
| 2014 | (South Korea) Jain Kim (3) | (Slovenia) Mina Markovič | (Austria) Magdalena Röck |
| 2015 | (Slovenia) Mina Markovič (3) | (South Korea) Jain Kim | (Austria) Jessica Pilz |
| 2016 | (Slovenia) Janja Garnbret | (Belgium) Anak Verhoeven | (South Korea) Jain Kim |
| 2017 | (Slovenia) Janja Garnbret (2) | (South Korea) Jain Kim | (Belgium) Anak Verhoeven |
| 2018 | (Slovenia) Janja Garnbret (3) | (Austria) Jessica Pilz | (South Korea) Jain Kim |
| 2019 | (South Korea) Seo Chae-hyun | (Slovenia) Janja Garnbret | (Japan) Natsuki Tanii |
| 2021 | (Slovenia) Janja Garnbret (4) | (United States) Natalia Grossman | (Italy) Laura Rogora |
| 2022 | (Slovenia) Janja Garnbret (5) | (South Korea) Seo Chae-hyun | (United States) Natalia Grossman |
| 2023 | (Austria) Jessica Pilz | (Slovenia) Janja Garnbret | (Slovenia) Vita Lukan |
| 2024 | (Austria) Jessica Pilz (2) | (Slovenia) Janja Garnbret | (Japan) Ai Mori |
| 2025 | (United Kingdom) Erin McNeice | (South Korea) Seo Chae-hyun | (Italy) Laura Rogora |
| 2026 | (United States) Annie Sanders | (Slovenia) Janja Garnbret | (South Korea) Seo Chae-hyun |

=== Bouldering ===
| Year | Winner | Second | Third |
|---|---|---|---|
| 1999 | (France) Stéphanie Bodet | (Russia) Elena Choumilova | (France) Sandrine Levet |
| 2000 | (France) Sandrine Levet | (Russia) Elena Choumilova | (France) Delphine Martin |
| 2001 | (France) Sandrine Levet (2) | (France) Myriam Motteau | (France) Corinne Théroux |
| 2002 | (France) Myriam Motteau (Ukraine) Nataliya Perlova (United States) Lisa Rands | — | — |
| 2003 | (France) Sandrine Levet (3) | (Russia) Olga Bibik | (Ukraine) Nataliya Perlova |
| 2004 | (France) Sandrine Levet (4) | (Russia) Olga Bibik | (Russia) Yulia Abramchuk |
| 2005 | (France) Sandrine Levet (5) | (Russia) Olga Bibik | (Russia) Yulia Abramchuk |
| 2006 | (Russia) Olga Bibik | (France) Juliette Danion | (Austria) Anna Stöhr |
| 2007 | (France) Juliette Danion | (Ukraine) Olga Shalagina | (Slovenia) Natalija Gros |
| 2008 | (Austria) Anna Stöhr | (Japan) Akiyo Noguchi | (Russia) Yulia Abramchuk |
| 2009 | (Japan) Akiyo Noguchi | (Austria) Anna Stöhr | (Slovenia) Natalija Gros |
| 2010 | (Japan) Akiyo Noguchi (2) | (Austria) Anna Stöhr | (Belgium) Chloé Graftiaux |
| 2011 | (Austria) Anna Stöhr (2) | (Japan) Akiyo Noguchi | (United States) Alex Puccio |
| 2012 | (Austria) Anna Stöhr (3) | (Japan) Akiyo Noguchi | (United Kingdom) Shauna Coxsey |
| 2013 | (Austria) Anna Stöhr (4) | (Japan) Akiyo Noguchi | (United States) Alex Puccio |
| 2014 | (Japan) Akiyo Noguchi (3) | (United Kingdom) Shauna Coxsey | (Austria) Anna Stöhr |
| 2015 | (Japan) Akiyo Noguchi (4) | (United Kingdom) Shauna Coxsey | (Japan) Miho Nonaka |
| 2016 | (United Kingdom) Shauna Coxsey | (Japan) Miho Nonaka | (France) Mélissa Le Nevé |
| 2017 | (United Kingdom) Shauna Coxsey (2) | (Slovenia) Janja Garnbret | (Japan) Akiyo Noguchi |
| 2018 | (Japan) Miho Nonaka | (Japan) Akiyo Noguchi | (France) Fanny Gibert |
| 2019 | (Slovenia) Janja Garnbret | (Japan) Akiyo Noguchi | (France) Fanny Gibert |
| 2021 | (United States) Natalia Grossman | (Slovenia) Janja Garnbret | (France) Oriane Bertone |
| 2022 | (United States) Natalia Grossman (2) | (Japan) Miho Nonaka | (United States) Brooke Raboutou |
| 2023 | (United States) Natalia Grossman (3) | (Japan) Miho Nonaka | (United States) Brooke Raboutou |
| 2024 | (United States) Natalia Grossman (4) | (Australia) Oceania Mackenzie | (Japan) Mao Nakamura |
| 2025 | (France) Oriane Bertone | (Japan) Mao Nakamura | (United States) Annie Sanders |
| 2026 | (United Kingdom) Erin McNeice | (Australia) Oceania Mackenzie | (United States) Annie Sanders |

=== Speed ===
| Year | Winner | Second | Third |
|---|---|---|---|
| 1998 | (Ukraine) Olga Zakharova | (Ukraine) Alena Ostapenko | (Ukraine) Nataliya Perlova |
| 1999 | (Ukraine) Olga Zakharova (2) | (Ukraine) Alena Ostapenko | (Russia) Zosia Podgorbounskikh |
| 2000 | (Ukraine) Olena Ryepko | (Ukraine) Olga Zakharova | (Russia) Zosia Podgorbounskikh |
| 2001 | (Ukraine) Olga Zakharova (3) | (Indonesia) Agung Ethi Hendrawati | (Russia) Zosia Podgorbounskikh |
| 2002 | (Ukraine) Olena Ryepko (2) | (Russia) Maya Piratinskaya | (Russia) Valentina Yurina |
| 2003 | (Russia) Valentina Yurina | (Russia) Anna Stenkovaya | (Ukraine) Olena Ryepko |
| 2004 | (Russia) Tatiana Ruyga | (Russia) Anna Stenkovaya | (Indonesia) Agung Ethi Hendrawati |
| 2005 | (Russia) Anna Stenkovaya | (Russia) Valentina Yurina | (Russia) Olga Evstigneeva |
| 2006 | (Russia) Tatiana Ruyga (2) | (Russia) Valentina Yurina | (Russia) Anna Stenkovaya |
| 2007 | (Russia) Tatiana Ruyga (3) | (Ukraine) Svitlana Tuzhylina | (Russia) Anna Stenkovaya |
| 2008 | (Poland) Edyta Ropek | (Ukraine) Olena Ryepko | (Ukraine) Svitlana Tuzhylina |
| 2009 | (Poland) Edyta Ropek (2) | (Russia) Anna Stenkovaya | (Russia) Valentina Yurina |
| 2010 | (Russia) Yulia Levochkina | (Russia) Ksenia Alekseeva | (Poland) Edyta Ropek |
| 2011 | (Poland) Edyta Ropek (3) | (Russia) Maria Krasavina | (Russia) Alina Gaydamakina |
| 2012 | (Russia) Alina Gaydamakina | (Russia) Yulia Levochkina | (Russia) Maria Krasavina |
| 2013 | (Russia) Alina Gaydamakina (2) | (Russia) Yulia Kaplina | (Poland) Aleksandra Rudzinska |
| 2014 | (Russia) Maria Krasavina | (Russia) Yulia Kaplina | (France) Anouck Jaubert |
| 2015 | (Russia) Maria Krasavina (2) | (France) Anouck Jaubert | (Russia) Yulia Kaplina |
| 2016 | (Russia) Yulia Kaplina | (France) Anouck Jaubert | (Poland) Klaudia Buczek |
| 2017 | (France) Anouck Jaubert | (Russia) Yulia Kaplina | (Russia) Maria Krasavina |
| 2018 | (France) Anouck Jaubert (2) | (Indonesia) Aries Susanti Rahayu | (Russia) Yulia Kaplina |
| 2019 | (China) Song Yiling | (France) Anouck Jaubert | (Indonesia) Aries Susanti Rahayu |
| 2021 | (United States) Emma Hunt | (Poland) Patrycja Chudziak | (Poland) Aleksandra Miroslaw (Russia) Ekaterina Barashchuk |
| 2022 | (Poland) Aleksandra Kałucka | (United States) Emma Hunt | (Poland) Natalia Kałucka |
| 2023 | (Poland) Natalia Kałucka | (Poland) Aleksandra Mirosław | (China) Deng Lijuan |
| 2024 | (China) Deng Lijuan | (Poland) Natalia Kałucka | (South Korea) Jimin Jeong |
| 2025 | (United States) Emma Hunt | (China) Zhou Yafei | (Indonesia) Desak Made Rita Kusuma Dewi |
| 2026 | (United States) Emma Hunt | (Ukraine) Polina Khalkevych | (Indonesia) Desak Made Rita Kusuma Dewi |

=== Combined ===
| Year | Winner | Second | Third |
|---|---|---|---|
| 1998 | (Ukraine) Nataliya Perlova | (Poland) Renata Piszczek | (Ukraine) Olena Ostapenko |
| 1999 | (Russia) Elena Choumilova | (France) Stéphanie Bodet | (France) Isabelle Bihr |
| 2000 | (France) Liv Sansoz | (France) Sandrine Levet | (Russia) Elena Choumilova |
| 2001 | (France) Sandrine Levet | (Slovenia) Martina Čufar | (Russia) Elena Choumilova (Switzerland) Annatina Schultz |
| 2002 | (France) Sandrine Levet (2) | (Ukraine) Olga Zakharova | (Italy) Jenny Lavarda |
| 2003 | (France) Sandrine Levet (3) | (Russia) Olga Bibik | (Austria) Barbara Bacher |
| 2004 | (France) Sandrine Levet (4) | (Italy) Jenny Lavarda | (Switzerland) Alexandra Eyer |
| 2005 | (France) Sandrine Levet (5) | (Russia) Anna Stenkovaya | (Italy) Jenny Lavarda |
| 2006 | (Austria) Angela Eiter | (Slovenia) Natalija Gros | (Slovenia) Maja Vidmar |
| 2007 | (Slovenia) Natalija Gros | (Austria) Angela Eiter | (Ukraine) Svitlana Tuzhylina |
| 2008 | (Japan) Akiyo Noguchi | (Austria) Johanna Ernst | (Slovenia) Natalija Gros |
| 2009 | (Japan) Akiyo Noguchi (2) | (South Korea) Jain Kim | (Austria) Johanna Ernst |
| 2010 | (South Korea) Jain Kim | (Japan) Akiyo Noguchi | (Slovenia) Natalija Gros |
| 2011 | (Slovenia) Mina Markovič | (South Korea) Jain Kim | (Japan) Akiyo Noguchi |
| 2012 | (Slovenia) Mina Markovič (2) | (South Korea) Jain Kim | (Japan) Akiyo Noguchi |
| 2013 | (Slovenia) Mina Markovič (3) | (Japan) Akiyo Noguchi | (Japan) Momoka Oda |
| 2014 | (Japan) Akiyo Noguchi (3) | (Slovenia) Mina Markovič | (Japan) Momoka Oda |
| 2015 | (South Korea) Jain Kim (2) | (Japan) Akiyo Noguchi | (Japan) Yuka Kobayashi |
| 2016 | (Slovenia) Janja Garnbret | (Japan) Akiyo Noguchi | (Austria) Jessica Pilz |
| 2017 | (Slovenia) Janja Garnbret (2) | (South Korea) Jain Kim | (United Kingdom) Shauna Coxsey |
| 2018 | (Slovenia) Janja Garnbret (3) | (Japan) Akiyo Noguchi | (Japan) Miho Nonaka |
| 2019 | (Slovenia) Janja Garnbret (4) | (Japan) Akiyo Noguchi | (Austria) Jessica Pilz |

== Season podium table ==
Updated after season 2026

=== Men's Category ===
| Rank | Nation | Gold | Silver | Bronze | Total |
|---|---|---|---|---|---|
| 1 | France (FRA) | 23 | 15 | 19 | 57 |
| 2 | Japan (JPN) | 16 | 12 | 23 | 51 |
| 3 | Austria (AUT) | 14 | 14 | 8 | 36 |
| 4 | Russia (RUS) | 13 | 22 | 15 | 50 |
| 5 | Czech Republic (CZE) | 9 | 9 | 9 | 27 |
| 6 | Ukraine (UKR) | 6 | 6 | 7 | 19 |
| 7 | Poland (POL) | 6 | 1 | 4 | 11 |
| 8 | Spain (ESP) | 5 | 7 | 4 | 16 |
| 9 | Italy (ITA) | 4 | 7 | 6 | 17 |
| 10 | Indonesia (INA) | 4 | 3 | 2 | 9 |
| 11 | Slovenia (SLO) | 3 | 0 | 5 | 8 |
| 12 | Great Britain (GBR) | 3 | 0 | 1 | 4 |
| 13 | Canada (CAN) | 2 | 5 | 2 | 9 |
| 14 | South Korea (KOR) | 2 | 3 | 0 | 5 |
| 15 | Netherlands (NED) | 2 | 2 | 0 | 4 |
| 16 | China (CHN) | 2 | 1 | 4 | 7 |
| 17 | United States (USA) | 1 | 2 | 3 | 6 |
| 18 | Germany (GER) | 1 | 2 | 1 | 4 |
| 19 | Iran (IRN) | 0 | 2 | 0 | 2 |
| 20 | Switzerland (SUI) | 0 | 0 | 2 | 2 |
| Totals (20 entries) | | 116 | 113 | 115 | 344 |

=== Women's Category ===
| Rank | Nation | Gold | Silver | Bronze | Total |
|---|---|---|---|---|---|
| 1 | France (FRA) | 23 | 16 | 19 | 58 |
| 2 | Slovenia (SLO) | 18 | 15 | 12 | 45 |
| 3 | United States (USA) | 14 | 2 | 11 | 27 |
| 4 | Russia (RUS) | 13 | 19 | 19 | 51 |
| 5 | Austria (AUT) | 12 | 6 | 11 | 29 |
| 6 | Japan (JPN) | 8 | 16 | 12 | 36 |
| 7 | Ukraine (UKR) | 7 | 8 | 6 | 21 |
| 8 | South Korea (KOR) | 6 | 11 | 4 | 21 |
| 9 | Poland (POL) | 5 | 4 | 5 | 14 |
| 10 | Belgium (BEL) | 5 | 4 | 3 | 12 |
| 11 | Great Britain (GBR) | 4 | 2 | 2 | 8 |
| 12 | China (CHN) | 2 | 1 | 1 | 4 |
| 13 | Indonesia (INA) | 0 | 2 | 4 | 6 |
| 13 | Italy (ITA) | 0 | 2 | 4 | 6 |
| 15 | Switzerland (SUI) | 0 | 2 | 3 | 5 |
| 16 | Australia (AUS) | 0 | 2 | 0 | 2 |
| Totals (16 entries) | | 117 | 112 | 116 | 345 |

== Medal table ==
Updated after Guiyang 2025

| Rank | Nation | Gold | Silver | Bronze | Total |
|---|---|---|---|---|---|
| 1 | France (FRA) | 181 | 176 | 184 | 541 |
| 2 | Russia (RUS) | 158 | 173 | 163 | 494 |
| 3 | Austria (AUT) | 115 | 85 | 78 | 278 |
| 4 | Slovenia (SLO) | 99 | 75 | 58 | 232 |
| 5 | Japan (JPN) | 89 | 117 | 113 | 319 |
| 6 | United States (USA) | 58 | 59 | 55 | 172 |
| 7 | Czech Republic (CZE) | 39 | 38 | 28 | 105 |
| 8 | Poland (POL) | 38 | 33 | 30 | 101 |
| 9 | China (CHN) | 38 | 25 | 32 | 95 |
| 10 | South Korea (KOR) | 37 | 32 | 34 | 103 |
| 11 | Spain (ESP) | 36 | 40 | 26 | 102 |
| 12 | Ukraine (UKR) | 35 | 33 | 47 | 115 |
| 13 | Great Britain (GBR) | 28 | 24 | 27 | 79 |
| 14 | Italy (ITA) | 27 | 44 | 38 | 109 |
| 15 | Belgium (BEL) | 25 | 29 | 19 | 73 |
| 16 | Indonesia (INA) | 21 | 24 | 26 | 71 |
| 17 | Germany (GER) | 17 | 22 | 27 | 66 |
| 18 | Switzerland (SUI) | 12 | 14 | 27 | 53 |
| 19 | Iran (IRI) | 6 | 2 | 6 | 14 |
| 20 | Canada (CAN) | 5 | 15 | 14 | 34 |
| 21 | Venezuela (VEN) | 5 | 2 | 3 | 10 |
| 22 | Netherlands (NED) | 4 | 9 | 16 | 29 |
| 23 | Singapore (SGP) | 1 | 0 | 2 | 3 |
| 24 | Israel (ISR) | 1 | 0 | 0 | 1 |
| 25 | Hungary (HUN) | 0 | 4 | 0 | 4 |
| 26 | Kazakhstan (KAZ) | 0 | 3 | 0 | 3 |
| 27 | Soviet Union (URS) | 0 | 1 | 0 | 1 |
| 28 | Serbia (SRB) | 0 | 0 | 3 | 3 |
| 29 | Norway (NOR) | 0 | 0 | 2 | 2 |
| 29 | Sweden (SWE) | 0 | 0 | 2 | 2 |
| 31 | Australia (AUS) | 0 | 0 | 1 | 1 |
| 31 | Bulgaria (BUL) | 0 | 0 | 1 | 1 |
| 31 | Finland (FIN) | 0 | 0 | 1 | 1 |
| 31 | Hong Kong (HKG) | 0 | 0 | 1 | 1 |
| Totals (34 entries) | | 1,075 | 1,079 | 1,064 | 3,218 |

== See also ==
- World Climbing
- World Climbing Championship
- World Climbing European Championships
- World Climbing Asia Championship
- List of best IFSC results
