= 2020 IFSC Climbing World Cup =

International sport climbing competition

- Organiser: IFSC
- Edition: 32nd
- Event: Lead
- Location: Briançon, France
- Dates: 20–22 August 2020

The 2020 IFSC Climbing World Cup was the 32nd edition of the World Cup held by the International Federation of Sport Climbing. It was scheduled to be held in 12 locations across three climbing disciplines, bouldering, lead and speed, due to the COVID-19 pandemic concerns, only one event was held, the Lead World Cup at Briançon in August, while all other World Cups were canceled.

== Original schedule ==
The 2020 IFSC Climbing World Cup was initially scheduled to be held in 12 locations, with six events each for the three climbing disciplines, bouldering, lead and speed, starting on 3 April and concluding on 11 October, with a break in August for the 2020 Summer Olympic Games.

| No. | Location | Date | Discipline | | |
| No. | Location | Date | Boulder | Lead | Speed |
|---|---|---|---|---|---|
| 1 | (Switzerland) Meiringen | 3–4 April | X | | |
| 2 | (China) Wujiang | 18–19 April | X | | |
| 3 | (China) Chongqing | 22 April | | | X |
| 4 | (South Korea) Seoul | 8–10 May | X | | X |
| 5 | (Germany) Munich | 23–24 May | X | | |
| 6 | (United States) Salt Lake City | 13–15 June | X | | X |
| 7 | (Austria) Innsbruck | 23–27 June | X | X | |
| 8 | (Switzerland) Villars | 2–4 July | | X | X |
| 9 | (France) Chamonix | 11–13 July | | X | X |
| 10 | (France) Briançon | 18–19 July | | X | |
| | (Japan) 2020 Summer Olympics — August 4–7 | | | | |
| 11 | (Slovenia) Ljubljana | 25–26 September | | X | |
| 12 | (China) Xiamen | 9–11 October | | X | X |

== Revised schedule ==
Following cancellations of events due to the COVID-19 pandemic, the IFSC announced a revised schedule of events. The modified schedule reduced the number of events to six, starting with a lead competition Briançon, France in August and ending with a speed and boulder competition in Xiamen, China in December. The IFSC further announced that it would not award official champions for the 2020 season.

Adam Ondra and Laura Rogora won the gold at Briançon for the men and women, respectively. Alex Megos, who finished fifth in the men's category, wrote a social media post criticised holding the event in the face of travel restrictions, meaning only European athletes could attend, and what he described as inconsistent masking and social distancing requirements.

However, three of the events scheduled in China were canceled in July after the Government of China ordered all international sporting events to be halted for the remainder of the year. In September 2020, following the Lead World Cup in Briançon in August, the IFSC announced the cancellation of the two remaining events, the Speed and Bouldering World Cups in Seoul, South Korea and Salt Lake City, United States, making Briançon World Cup the only world climbing event of the 2020 season.

| No. | Location | Date | D | G | Gold | | Silver | | Bronze | |
|---|---|---|---|---|---|---|---|---|---|---|
| 1 | (France) Briançon | 21–22 August | L | M | (Czech Republic) Adam Ondra | Top | (Slovenia) Domen Škofic | 41 | (Austria) Jakob Schubert | 38+ |
| 1 | (France) Briançon | 21–22 August | L | W | (Italy) Laura Rogora | Top | (Slovenia) Janja Garnbret | Top | (France) Fanny Gibert | 42 |
| 2 | (United States) Salt Lake City | 11–13 September | S | Canceled | | | | | | |
| 2 | (United States) Salt Lake City | 11–13 September | B | Canceled | | | | | | |
| 3 | (South Korea) Seoul | 7–11 October | S | Canceled | | | | | | |
| 3 | (South Korea) Seoul | 7–11 October | B | Canceled | | | | | | |
| 3 | (South Korea) Seoul | 7–11 October | L | Canceled | | | | | | |
| 4 | (China) Chongqing | 23–25 October | S | Canceled | | | | | | |
| 4 | (China) Chongqing | 23–25 October | B | Canceled | | | | | | |
| 5 | (China) Wujiang | 30 October–1 November | S | Canceled | | | | | | |
| 5 | (China) Wujiang | 30 October–1 November | B | Canceled | | | | | | |
| 6 | (China) Xiamen | 4–6 December | S | Canceled | | | | | | |
| 6 | (China) Xiamen | 4–6 December | L | Canceled | | | | | | |

== Results ==
=== Lead World Cup Briançon ===
==== Women ====
| Rank | Name | Score |
|---|---|---|
| 1 | (Italy) Laura Rogora | TOP |
| 2 | (Slovenia) Janja Garnbret | TOP |
| 3 | (France) Fanny Gibert | 42 |
| 4 | (Austria) Jessica Pilz | 41+ |
| 5 | (Slovenia) Vita Lukan | 39+ |
| 6 | (Slovenia) Tjasa Kalan | 39+ |
| 7 | (France) Nina Arthaud | 34+ |
| 8 | (Italy) Giorgia Tesio | 30+ |
| 9 | (Slovenia) Lucija Tarkus | 24+ |

==== Men ====
| Rank | Name | Score |
|---|---|---|
| 1 | (Czech Republic) Adam Ondra | TOP |
| 2 | (Slovenia) Domen Škofic | 41 |
| 3 | (Austria) Jakob Schubert | 38+ |
| 4 | (Slovenia) Luka Potočar | 30 |
| 5 | (Germany) Alex Megos | 27 |
| 6 | (Austria) Mathias Posch | 26 |
| 7 | (France) Mejdi Schalck | 25+ |
| 8 | (France) Nao Monchois | 25+ |

== Medal table ==
| Rank | Nation | Gold | Silver | Bronze | Total |
|---|---|---|---|---|---|
| 1 | Czech Republic (CZE) | 1 | 0 | 0 | 1 |
| 1 | Italy (ITA) | 1 | 0 | 0 | 1 |
| 3 | Slovenia (SLO) | 0 | 2 | 0 | 2 |
| 4 | Austria (AUT) | 0 | 0 | 1 | 1 |
| 4 | France (FRA) | 0 | 0 | 1 | 1 |
| Totals (5 entries) | | 2 | 2 | 2 | 6 |

== See also ==
- Impact of the COVID-19 pandemic on sports
- 2020 IFSC Climbing European Championships
