= Stéphanie Bodet =

French rock climber, writer and blogger (born 1976)

- Born: 1976 (age 49–50)
- Occupations: French rock climber, writer and blogger

Stéphanie Bodet (born 14 March 1976) is a French rock climber, competition climber, writer and blogger.

Bodet was born on 14 March 1976 in Limoges, and grew up in Gap, Hautes-Alpes. She was asthmatic as a child, but started rock climbing aged 14 on the cliffs of Céüse.

She climbed competitively between 1993 and 2002, winning the overall first-ever IFSC Climbing World Cup women's competition bouldering event in 1999.

She has made first ascents of climbing routes in countries including China, Madagascar, Morocco and Spain.

Bernard Delapierre made the 20-minute film J'ai demandé la lune au rocher (Of the rock I asked for the moon) in which Bodet describes her ascent of the 8a+ (5.13c) graded sport climbing route Octogénèse, in Corsica.

She is married to French climber Arnaud Petit, with whom she has climbed and written books. They live with their cat, Pinpoune, in Cucuron, near Buoux. She has a master's degree in French literature, and as of 2024 was training as a yoga teacher.

== Selected publications ==
- Bodet, Stéphanie (2008). Salto Angel. Chamonix: Guérin. ISBN 978-2352210269.
- Petit, Arnaud; Bodet, Stéphanie (2011). Parois de légende. Grenoble: Glénat. ISBN 9782723483285.
- Bodet, Stéphanie (2018). Habiter le monde: roman. Paris: Gallimard. ISBN 9782072821226.
- Bodet, Stéphanie (2021). À la verticale de soi. Paris: Gallimard. ISBN 9782072857652.
- Petit, Arnaud; Bodet, Stéphanie (2023). Nouvelles parois de légende. Grenoble: Glénat. ISBN 9782344054574.
- Bodet, Stephanie (2024). Tre Cime: Classic & Modern Routes. Versante Sud S.R.L. ISBN 978-8887890976. Translated by A. Foli
