= Liv Sansoz =

French rock climber

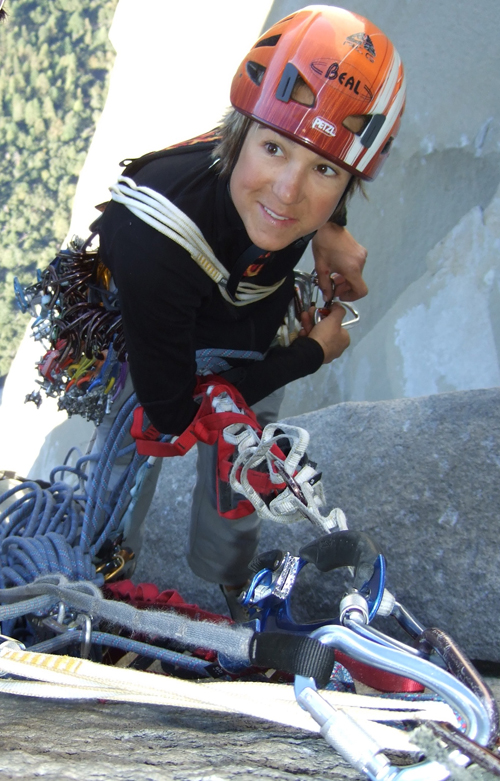

Personal information
- Nationality: French
- Born: February 12, 1977 (age 49) Bourg-Saint-Maurice
- Occupation: Professional rock climber
- Height: 162 cm (5 ft 4 in)
- Weight: 45 kg (99 lb)
- Website: livsansoz.net

Climbing career
- Type of climber: Competition climbing; Sport climbing; Ice climbing; Alpine climbing
- Highest grade: Redpoint: 8c+ (5.14c); Onsight/Flash: 7c (5.12d)
- Retired from competition: 2003
- Known for: Three times World Cup winner and twice World Champion in Lead climbing
- Updated on April 30, 2019

Liv Sansoz (born 12 February 1977) is a French professional rock climber, ice climber, and base jumper. She is known for being three times World Cup winner and twice World Champion in Lead climbing. She had a year off after a fall but returned and climbed every Alp over 4,000 metres.

== Climbing career ==
Sansoz was born in Bourg-Saint-Maurice in 1977 and grew up in the alps where she discovered climbing. Her parents built her a climbing wall and by 16 she was in the French National team.

She has twice been the world champion and she has won the World Cup three times. She lost her confidence for a year after she cracked a vertebra in her neck after a 10-metre fall. This ended her competitive career but she regained her confidence to climb.

In 2017 she set out to climb every Alpine summit over 4,000 metres in a year. By July she was suffering from sleep deprivation but she had climbed 48 peaks combining the descent with skiing and paragliding when it was possible. Sometimes she was waking at three in the morning and then climbing for over 12 hours in a day.

== Rankings ==
=== Climbing World Cup ===
Discipline	1993	1994	1995	1996	1997	1998	1999	2000	2001	2002	2003
Lead	6	4	3	1	2	1	2	1	-	-	36

=== Climbing World Championships ===
Discipline	1995	1997	1999	2001	2003
Lead	3	1	1	-	26

== Number of medals in the Climbing World Cup ==
=== Lead ===
Season	Gold	Silver	Bronze	Total
1993		1		1
1994			1	1
1995		1	2	3
1996	2		1	3
1997	2	2		4
1998	2	1		3
1999	2	1		3
2000	3	1	1	5
Total	11	7	5	23

== Notable climbs ==
=== Redpointed ===
8c+ (5.14c):

- Hasta La Vista - Mount Charleston (USA) - 1 August 2000 - Second female ascent of an 8c+ route

8b+ (5.14a):

- Route of all evil - Virgin River Gorge (USA) - 8 April 2001
- Soul of train - Mount Charleston (USA) - 20 August 2000

8b (5.13d):

- White Wedding - Smith Rock (USA) - 6 May 2008
- Fox et Mathews - Orgon (FRA) - 9 April 1999
- Rio de janvier - Calanques (FRA) - 1 March 1998
- Sortilège - Cimaï (FRA) - 1 May 1996

=== Onsighted ===
7c (5.12d):

- Berlin - Céüse (FRA)
- War Lords - Mount Charleston (USA) - 1 August 2000
- Le Danti - Calanques (FRA)

=== Big wall ===
- Super Cirill - Ticino (SUI) - 2010
- The Nose - El Capitan (USA) - 2008
