= Jean-Baptiste Tribout =

French rock climber

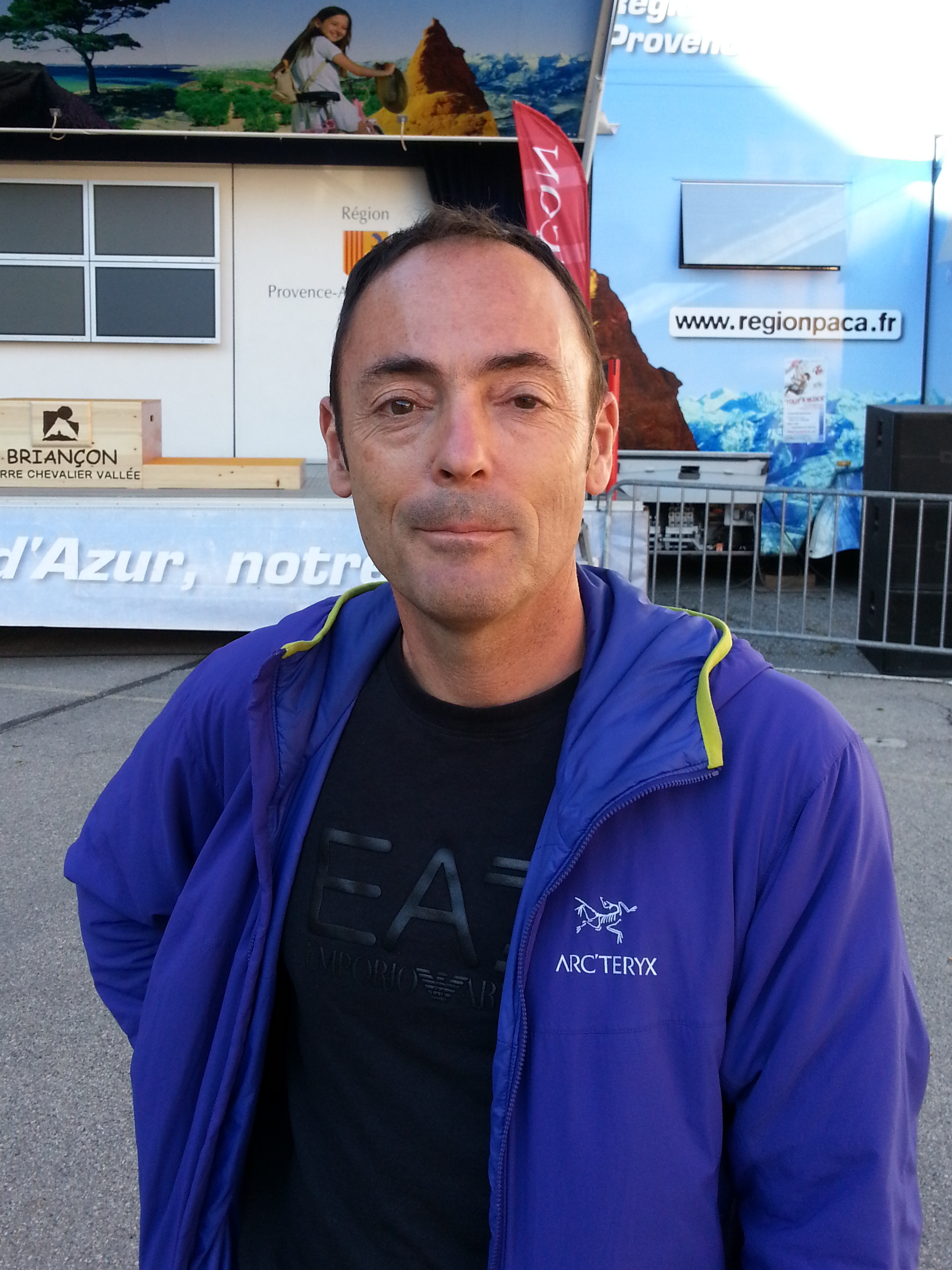

Personal information
- Nationality: French
- Born: December 14, 1961 (age 64) Paris
- Height: 1.73 m (5 ft 8 in)
- Weight: 63 kg (139 lb)

Climbing career
- Type of climber: Competition climbing; Sport climbing
- Highest grade: 8c+ (5.14c)
- Retired from competition: 1998
Medal record
IFSC Climbing World Cup
Bronze medal – third place	1992	Lead
Bronze medal – third place	1994	Lead

Jean-Baptiste Tribout, or J.B. Tribout (born 14 December 1961) is a French rock climber and competition climber.

== Climbing history ==
Tribout started climbing at age seven in Fontainebleau, France with his grandfather, a mountaineer, and also joined the youth section of the French Alpine Club. There he met other young climbers such as Catherine Destivelle. In 1982, he climbed his first 8a (5.13b)-graded sport climbing route, Fritz the Cat, at Saussois, and in 1985 climbed his first 8b (5.13d)-graded route, Les braves gens, in the Verdon Gorge.

Between 1986 and 1998, he participated in international competition climbing events, finishing third twice and fourth twice in the final standings of the World Cup. In 2008, aged 47, twelve years after he had last climbed an 8c (5.14b)-graded climb, he climbed two 8c routes.

== Competition Record ==
=== World Cup ===
1989	1990	1991	1992	1993	1994	1995	1996
4	?	4	3	16	3	6	19

=== World Championship ===
1991	1993	1995	1997
35	32	-	4

=== European Championship ===
1992	1996
17	16

=== Rock Master ===
1987	1988	1989	1990	1991	1992
3	?	2	2	?	9

== Notable Ascents ==
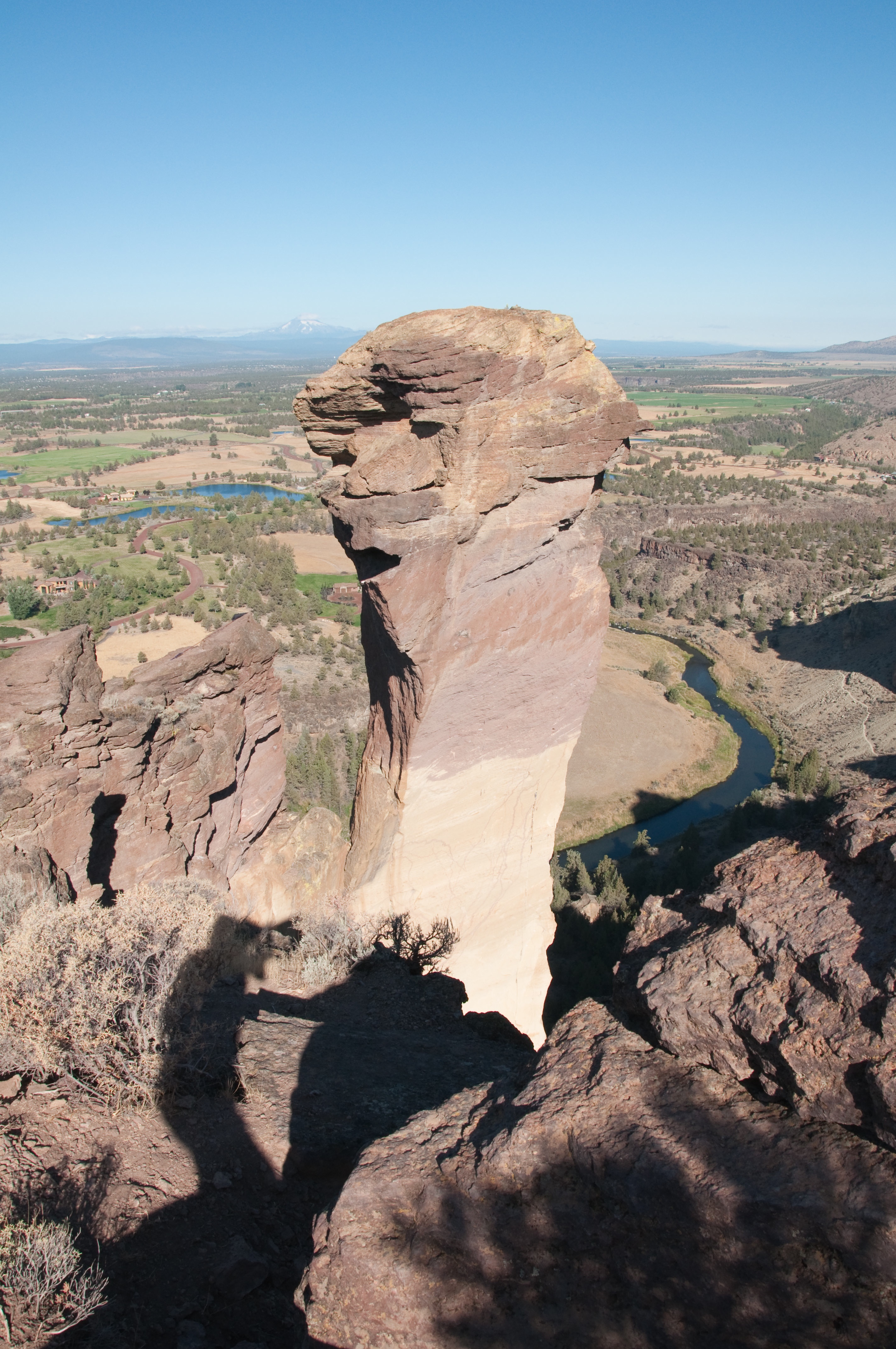
The East Face of Monkey Face at Smith Rock containing Just do it, 8c+ / 5.14c, established by Tribout in 1992 and at the time considered the hardest route in the USA.

This ascent is the subject of controversy as Tribout sent it after American climber Alan Watts had bolted it. Climber Tommy Caldwell later recounted this controversy in his book, The Push. Furthermore, Tribout's use of a chisel to create better holds inflamed local climbing ethics at the time and to this day.

=== 8c+/5.14c ===
- The Connexion - Orgon - 1994 - First ascent (combination of Macumba Club and The Bronx)
- Superplafond - Volx - 1994 - First ascent (combination of the Maginot Line, called by the French Le plafond, and Terminator)
- Just do it - Smith Rock - 1992 - First ascent

=== 8c/5.14b ===
- Intime étrangère - Tournoux - August 4, 2008
- Guerre d'usure - Claret - 24 February 2008 - aged 47
- Macumba Club - Orgon - 1992 - First ascent
- Huevos Rancheros - Gache - 1991 - First ascent
- Maginot Line - Volx - 1990 - after Ben Moon in 1989

=== 8b+/5.14a ===
- Les intermutants du spectacle - St Leger - May 16, 2009
- Deux cones - Orgon - August 9, 2008
- Rollito Sharma - Santa Linya - April 19, 2008
- Draconian Devil - Kalymnos - 2006
- I am a bad man - Smith Rock - 1991
- Cannibal - American Forks - 1990
- Cry Freedom - Malham Cove - 1989 - Second ascent
- Magie Noire - Traverses - 1989
- Masse Critique - Cimaï - 1989 - First ascent
- Revanche - Saussois - 1988 - First ascent
- White wedding - Smith Rock - 1988 - First ascent
- La rage de vivre - Buoux - 1987 - Second ascent
- Le Spectre du surmutant - Buoux - 1987 - First ascent
- Les spécialistes - Verdon Gorge - 1987 - First ascent
- To Bolt or not to be - Smith Rock - 1986 - First ascent and first 5.14 in the United States

== See also ==
- List of grade milestones in rock climbing
- History of rock climbing
