= Alexandre Chabot =

French rock climber

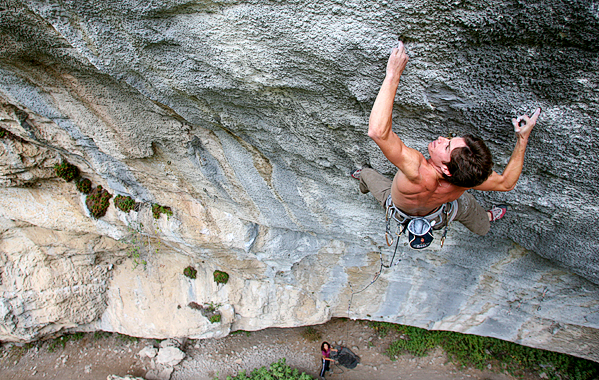
- Chabot climbing PuntX (9a) at Gorges du Loup (France)

Personal information
- Born: 27 December 1981 (age 44) Reims, France
- Occupation: Professional rock climber
- Height: 170 cm (5 ft 7 in)
- Weight: 58 kg (128 lb)

Climbing career
- Type of climber: Lead climbing
- Highest grade: Redpoint: 9a (5.14d); Onsight/Flash: 8b+ (5.14a)
- Retired from competition: 2007
- Known for: Winning three Lead Climbing World Cups
Medal record
World Cup
Second place	2000	Lead
Winner	2001	Lead
Winner	2002	Lead
Winner	2003	Lead
Second place	2004	Lead
World Championships
Bronze medal – third place	2005	Lead
European Championships
Winner	2000	Lead
Winner	2002	Lead
Second place	2004	Lead
- Updated on 12 January 2021

Alexandre Chabot (French: [alɛksɑ̃dʁ ʃabo]; born 27 December 1981) is a French professional rock climber, specialising in lead climbing. He won three consecutive Lead Climbing World Cups and three consecutive Rock Masters. In France, he was awarded seven times the national Lead Climbing Champion title.

== Biographic notes ==
He discovered climbing when he was six years old, during a vacation with his parents at Col des Grand Montets, near Chamonix. When he was 13 he joined a local climbing club.

In 1997 (age 16) he redpointed his first 8a route, Rêve de Papillon (Buoux, France).

In 2000 (age 18) he won his first World Cup medal.

== Rankings ==
=== Climbing World Cup ===
Discipline	1999	2000	2001	2002	2003	2004	2005
Lead	23	2	1	1	1	2	5

=== Climbing World Championships ===
Discipline	1999	2001	2003	2005	2007
Lead	6	4	5	3	16

== Number of medals in the Climbing World Cup ==
=== Lead ===
Season	Gold	Silver	Bronze	Total
2000	1	2		3
2001	3		1	4
2002	6	1		7
2003	5	2		7
2004	4		1	5
2005	2		1	3
Total	21	5	3	29

== Notable ascents ==
=== Redpointed routes ===
9a (5.14d):

- PuntX - Gorges du Loup (FRA) - 12 August 2007 - First ascent
- Abysse - Gorges du Loup (FRA) - 28 July 2006 - First ascent
- Kinematix - Gorges du Loup (FRA) - 5 September 2003

8c+ (5.14c):

- Trip-Tik To-Nik - Gorges du Loup (FRA)
- Reaccion indirecta - Argentina
- Ultimate Sacrifice - Gorges du Loup (FRA) - 25 August 2003

== See also ==
- List of grade milestones in rock climbing
- History of rock climbing
- Rankings of most career IFSC gold medals
