= Jérôme Meyer =

French rock climber

Personal information
- Born: May 31, 1979 (age 47) Lons-le-Saunier, France
- Occupation: Professional rock climber
- Height: 180 cm (5 ft 11 in)
- Weight: kg

Climbing career
- Type of climber: Competition climbing
- Retired from competition: 2008
- Known for: Winning 4 Bouldering World Cups
- Updated on April 30, 2019

Jérôme Meyer (born May 31, 1979) is a French professional rock climber, specializing in competition bouldering. He is known for winning four Bouldering World Cups (2001, 2002, 2003, 2006).

== Biographic notes ==
Son of mountaineers, Meyer engaged in skiing, mountain trekking, and mountain biking since he was a child. When he was 12 years old, he joined the climbing gym in Chambéry.

He started competing in 1999 and throughout his career, he won four Bouldering World Cups (2001, 2002, 2003, 2006).

He retired from international competitions in 2008, after the European Climbing Championship. Since then, he served as a director in the International Federation of Sport Climbing.

== Rankings ==
=== Climbing World Cup ===
Discipline	1999	2000	2001	2002	2003	2004	2005	2006	2007	2008
Bouldering	3	7	1	1	1	3	2	1	10	23

=== Climbing World Championships ===
Discipline	2001	2003	2005
Bouldering	3	2	10

== Number of medals in the Climbing World Cup ==
=== Bouldering ===
Season	Gold	Silver	Bronze	Total
1999		1	1	2
2000			1	1
2001	2		3	5
2002	1			1
2003	3		2	5
2004	1	1		2
2005	1		1	2
2006	3	2	1	6
2007		1		1
2008				0
Totale	11	5	9	25

== See also ==
- List of grade milestones in rock climbing
- History of rock climbing
- Rankings of most career IFSC gold medals
