= Sandrine Levet =

French rock climber

Personal information
- Nationality: French
- Born: 22 July 1982 (age 44) Haute Savoie, France
- Occupation: Professional rock climber
- Height: 170 cm (5 ft 7 in)
- Weight: 52 kg (115 lb)

Climbing career
- Type of climber: Competition climbing; Sport climbing; Bouldering
- Highest grade: Redpoint: 9a (5.14d)
- Known for: Won 5 Bouldering World Cups; Won 5 Combined World Cups; Won a Bouldering World Championship
Medal record
Women's competition climbing
Representing France
IFSC Climbing World Cup
Bronze medal – third place	1999	Bouldering
Winner	2000	Bouldering
Silver medal – second place	2000	Combined
Bronze medal – third place	2001	Lead
Winner	2001	Bouldering
Winner	2001	Combined
Silver medal – second place	2002	Lead
Winner	2002	Combined
Silver medal – second place	2003	Lead
Winner	2003	Bouldering
Winner	2003	Combined
Winner	2004	Bouldering
Winner	2004	Combined
Winner	2005	Bouldering
Winner	2005	Combined
Silver medal – second place	2006	Lead
IFSC Climbing World Championships
Silver medal – second place	2001	Bouldering
Winner	2003	Bouldering
Rock Master
Winner	2002	Lead
Winner	2006	Lead
- Updated on 1 May 2019

Sandrine Levet (born 22 July 1982) is a French professional rock climber, specializing in competition climbing and competition bouldering and competition lead climbing in particular. Levet is one of the most successful female competition climbers in history. Levet dominated competition bouldering in the early to mid-2000s, winning five IFSC Bouldering World Cups, and one IFSC Bouldering World Championship. Levet was also a strong competition lead climber, finishing second three times in the IFSC Lead Climbing World Cup, which also helped her to win the overall IFSC Combined Climbing World Cup five times. As of the end of 2022, Levet had won the second-most IFSC gold medals of any female competition climber in history.

== Biographic notes ==
Daughter of mountaineers, she started climbing when she was five years old. In the following ten years, she also practiced cross-country skiing, ski mountaineering, gymnastics and swimming.

== Rankings ==
=== Climbing World Cup ===
Discipline	1999	2000	2001	2002	2003	2004	2005	2006	2007	2008
Lead	24	9	3	2	2	13	12	2	17	
Bouldering	3	1	1	15	1	1	1		33	22
Combined		2	1	1	1	1	1			

=== Climbing World Championships ===
Discipline	2001	2003	2005	2007
Bouldering	2	1	16	8

== Number of medals in the Climbing World Cup ==
=== Lead ===
Season	Gold	Silver	Bronze	Total
2001	1	2		3
2002		2	2	4
2003	2	3	3	8
2004			1	1
2005		2	1	3
2006	2	2	2	6
Total	5	11	9	25

=== Bouldering ===
Season	Gold	Silver	Bronze	Total
1999		1	1	2
2000	1	1	1	3
2001	4	1		5
2002			1	1
2003	5			5
2004	5		1	6
2005	2	2		4
Total	17	5	4	26

== See also ==
- List of grade milestones in rock climbing
- History of rock climbing
- Rankings of most career IFSC gold medals
