= Tomáš Mrázek =

Czech rock climber

Personal information
- Nationality: Czech
- Born: August 24, 1982 (age 44) Brno
- Height: 178 cm (5 ft 10 in)
- Weight: 62 kg (137 lb)
- Website: www.tomasmrazek.cz

Climbing career
- Type of climber: Sport climbing
- Highest grade: Redpoint: 9a+ (5.15a); Onsight/Flash: 8c (5.14b)
- Retired from competition: 2010
Medal record
World Cup
Winner	2004	Lead
Winner	2006	Combined
World Championships
Gold medal – first place	2003	Lead
Gold medal – first place	2005	Lead
Silver medal – second place	2001	Lead
Bronze medal – third place	2007	Lead
European Championships
Silver medal – second place	2002	Lead
Silver medal – second place	2008	Lead
Bronze medal – third place	2007	Bouldering
World Games
Silver medal – second place	2005	Lead
- Updated on 13 May 2013

Tomáš Mrázek (born August 24, 1982, in Brno) is a professional Czech rock climber specializing in lead climbing competitions. He won two World Championships, in 2003 and 2005, and one Lead World Cup, in 2004.

== Biography ==
Tomáš started climbing on the rocks of Stránská skála near Brno in 1997. Only two years later, he could climb his first 8a and in the subsequent year managed to win the Czech Championship in lead climbing.

- In 2001 he became Junior World Champion in Imst, Austria, Vice World Champion in Winterthur, Suisse, and he won the prestigious Rock Master competition in Arco, Italy.
- In 2002 he reached the overall 2nd place of the Lead World Cup and succeeded to repeat the legendary route Underground 9a redpoint in Massone near Arco.
- In 2003 he won the World Championship in lead in Chamonix, France, and climbed Sanjski Par Extension 9a in Mišja Peč, Slovenia.
- In 2004 he became overall winner of the Lead World Cup.
- In 2005 he repeated to win the World Championships in Munich, Germany and placed 2nd at the World Games in Duisburg, Germany. Moreover he succeeded to onsight Pata Negra in Rodellar, the second 8c onsight ever, and Martin Krpan 9a in Mišja Peč.

Tomáš has been keeping to win the Czech Championships annually.

== Rankings ==
=== Climbing World Cup ===
Discipline	2000	2001	2002	2003	2004	2005	2006	2007	2008	2009
Lead	23	3	2	6	1	8	3	3	2	16
Bouldering	73						6	9	42	
Speed								52		
Combined	13						1	2	3	

=== Climbing World Championships ===
Discipline	2001	2003	2005	2007	2009
Lead	2	1	1	3	18

== Number of medals in the World Cup ==
=== Lead ===
Season	Gold	Silver	Bronze	Total
2000				
2001	2			2
2002		3	1	4
2003		2		2
2004	4	4	1	9
2005				
2006	1		3	4
2007	2	1	1	4
2008	1	1	1	3
2009			1	1
Total	10	11	8	29

== Rock climbing ==
=== Redpointed routes ===
9a+ (5.15a):

- Xaxid Hostel - Mišja Peč (SLO) - 5 November 2009 - First ascent
- Open Your Mind Direct - Santa Linya (ESP) - 2009

9a (5.14d):

- Halupca 1978 - Mišja Peč (SLO)
- Fuck the system - Santa Linya (ESP) - 20 March 2009
- Seleció natural extensión - Santa Linya (ESP) - 10 March 2009
- Analogica - Santa Linya (ESP) - 16 December 2008
- Martin Krpan - Mišja Peč (SLO) - 5 April 2005
- Sanjski Par Extension - Mišja Peč (SLO) - 4 April 2003
- Underground - Massone (ITA) - 2002 - Bolted by Manfred Stuffer in 1998

=== Onsighted routes ===
8c (5.14b):

- Humildes pa´casa – Oliana (ESP) – 17 March 2009
- Pata Negra - Rodellar (ESP) – 10 August 2005 – Second-ever 8c onsight in history after Yuji Hirayama.

== See also ==
- List of grade milestones in rock climbing
- History of rock climbing
- Rankings of most career IFSC gold medals
