= Christian Core =

Italian rock climber

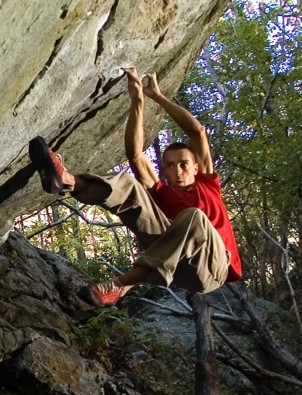
- Christian Core on Gioia (8C+), Varazze

Personal information
- Nationality: Italian
- Born: 5 October 1974 (age 51) Savona, Italy
- Occupation: Professional rock climber
- Height: 177 cm (5 ft 10 in)
- Weight: 61 kg (134 lb)

Climbing career
- Type of climber: Competition climbing; Bouldering; Sport climbing
- Highest grade: Redpoint: 8c (5.14b); Onsight/Flash: 8a (5.13b); Bouldering: 8C+ (V16)
- First ascents: Gioia (V16, 2008)
- Known for: first-ever person to climb an 8C+ (V16) boulder
Medal record
Men's competition climbing
Representing Italy
World Cup
| Winner | 1999 | Bouldering |
| Winner | 2002 | Bouldering |
World Championships
| Bronze medal – third place | 2001 | Bouldering |
| Gold medal – first place | 2003 | Bouldering |
European Championships
| Gold medal – first place | 2002 | Bouldering |
- Updated on 31 October 2017

Christian Core (born 5 October 1974) is an Italian professional rock climber who specialises in bouldering and competition bouldering. He is known for being the first-ever person in the world to climb an 8C+ (V16) boulder, Gioia, in 2008. As a competition climber, Core won the Bouldering World Cup twice in 1999 and 2002, and also won the Bouldering World Championship in 2003.

== Climbing career ==
=== Competition climbing ===
In 1999 Core stopped competing in the Lead Climbing World Cup and started participating in the Bouldering World Cup, organized by UIAA in that year for the first time in history. He immediately won the Cup, and again in 2002. In 2003, he earned the title of World Champion in bouldering.

=== Bouldering ===
He has ascended several very hard boulders in Italy near Bobbio Pellice, Varazze, and Triora. In 2008, he climbed Gioia, the first-ever boulder graded 8C+ (V16) in history, and was for 8 years, the most difficult boulder in the world. In 2011, Adam Ondra repeated the ascent and confirmed the grade, however, in 2015, Core announced that a hold broke on Gioia, which he could only partially repair, and which slightly lowered the grade.

== Personal life ==
In 2009, he married the climber Stella Marchisio.

== Rankings ==
Climbing World Cup

| | 1995 | 1996 | 1997 | 1998 |
|---|---|---|---|---|
| Lead | 10 | 11 | 9 | 17 |

| | 1999 | 2000 | 2001 | 2002 | 2003 | 2004 | 2005 | 2006 | 2007 | 2008 | 2009 | 2010 | 2011 | 2012 |
|---|---|---|---|---|---|---|---|---|---|---|---|---|---|---|
| Bouldering | 1 | 8 | 7 | 1 | 8 | 16 | 4 | 4 | 13 | 16 | 54 | 26 | 54 | 32 |

Climbing World Championships

| | 1997 | 1999 | 2001 | 2003 | 2005 | 2007 | 2009 | 2011 |
|---|---|---|---|---|---|---|---|---|
| Lead | 7 | - | - | - | - | - | - | - |
| Bouldering | - | - | 3 | 1 | 18 | 10 | 10 | 33 |

Climbing European Championships

| | 1998 | 2000 | 2002 | 2004 | 2007 | 2008 | 2010 |
|---|---|---|---|---|---|---|---|
| Lead | 10 | - | - | - | - | - | - |
| Bouldering | - | - | 1 | - | 16 | 10 | 7 |

== Number of medals in the Climbing World Cup ==
Bouldering

| Season | Gold | Silver | Bronze | Total |
|---|---|---|---|---|
| 1999 | 2 | 1 | | 3 |
| 2000 | | 1 | 1 | 2 |
| 2001 | | 1 | | 1 |
| 2002 | 1 | 1 | | 2 |
| 2003 | | | 1 | 1 |
| 2004 | | 1 | | 1 |
| 2005 | | 1 | | 1 |
| 2006 | | | 1 | 1 |
| 2010 | | | 1 | 1 |
| Total | 3 | 6 | 4 | 13 |

== Rock climbing ==
=== Redpointed routes ===
Core redpointed 8c (5.14b) and onsighted 8a (5.13b) routes.

=== Boulder problems ===
Core redpointed 8C+ (V16) and flashed 8A (V11) boulder problems.

8C+/V16:

- Gioia – Varazze (ITA) – 2008 – First ascent. Adam Ondra repeated it on 6 December 2011 and confirmed the 8C+ grade. Third ascent by Nalle Hukkataival

8C/V15:

- Kimera – Rifugio Barbara (Bobbio Pellice, ITA) – 2006 – First ascent

8B+/V14:

- Toky – Val Ellero (ITA) – 2009 – First ascent
- New Base Line – Magic Wood (CHE) – 2006
- Beautiful mind – Albarracin (ESP) – 2006 – First ascent
- Ajna – Varazze (ITA) – 2004 – First ascent
- Toguro – Varazze (ITA) – 2003 – First ascent
- Dreamtime – Cresciano (CHE) – 2003 – Fifth ascent (first ascent by Fred Nicole)
- Taklimakam plus – Varazze (ITA) – 2002 – First ascent
- Shadowfax – Chironico (CHE) – 2002 – Third ascent (first ascent by Dave Graham)

== Film ==
- i Core, my climbing family – 2012 – Regia di Angelo Poli – 45'

== See also ==
- List of grade milestones in rock climbing
- History of rock climbing
- Rankings of most career IFSC gold medals

== Bibliografia ==
- Andrea Gennari Daneri, Christian Core (2000). Pareti e Montagne edizioni (ed.). Train!.
