= 2008 IFSC Climbing World Cup =

International sport climbing competition

- Location: Hall, Austria Trento, Italy; Réunion, France; Grindelwald, Switzerland; Vail, United States; Fiera di Primiero, Italy; Qinghai, China; Montauban, France; Chamonix, France; Val Daone, Italy; Bern, Switzerland; Imst, Austria; Puurs, Belgium; Moscow, Russia Kranj, Slovenia
- Date: 18 April – 16 November 2008

Champions
- Men: (B) (Austria) Kilian Fischhuber (L) (Netherlands) Jorg Verhoeven (S) (Russia) Evgenii Vaitsekhovskii (C) (Austria) David Lama
- Women: (B) (Austria) Anna Stöhr (L) (Austria) Johanna Ernst (S) (Poland) Edyta Ropek (C) (Japan) Akiyo Noguchi

The 2008 IFSC Climbing World Cup was held in 15 locations. Bouldering competitions were held in 7 locations, lead in 6 locations, and speed in 6 locations. The season began on 18 April in Hall, Austria and concluded on 16 November in Kranj, Slovenia.

The top 3 in each competition received medals, and the overall winners were awarded trophies. At the end of the season an overall ranking was determined based upon points, which athletes were awarded for finishing in the top 30 of each individual event.

The winners for bouldering were Kilian Fischhuber and Anna Stöhr, for lead Jorg Verhoeven and Johanna Ernst, for speed Evgenii Vaitsekhovskii and Edyta Ropek, and for combined David Lama and Akiyo Noguchi, men and women respectively. The National Team for bouldering was Austria, for lead Austria, and for speed Russian Federation.

== Highlights of the season ==
In bouldering, at the World Cup in Moscow, in the women's final, there were three athletes who flashed all 4 boulders (Katharina Saurwein of Austria, Natalija Gros and Katja Vidmar both of Slovenia), however Katharina Saurwein of Austria was the only one who flashed all boulders in the competition (qualification, semifinal, final) and thus taking the win. At the end of the season, Austrian athletes, Kilian Fischhuber and Anna Stöhr clinched the overall titles of the season for men and women respectively, making it double bouldering titles for Austria.

In lead climbing, Johanna Ernst of Austria, in her first year of eligibility to compete in the World Cup circuit, made her debut in bouldering in Hall, Austria. Then she competed in lead climbing and won 3 out of 6 Lead World Cups and became the overall women's lead climbing winner of the season.

== Overview ==
No.	Location	D	G	Gold	Silver	Bronze
1	(Austria) Hall; 18–19 April 2008	B	M	(Austria) Kilian Fischhuber; 3t5 3b5	(Russia) Dmitrii Sharafutdinov; 2t2 2b2	(United States) Daniel Woods; 2t4 3b4
1	(Austria) Hall; 18–19 April 2008	B	W	(Austria) Anna Stöhr; 3t3 4b8	(Russia) Yulia Abramchuk; 3t8 4b9	(Sweden) Angelica Lind; 2t2 4b5
2	(Italy) Trento; 27 April 2008	S	M	(Russia) Evgenii Vaitsekhovskii; 12.580	(Russia) Sergei Sinitcyn; 13.590	(Venezuela) Manuel Escobar; 13.130
2	(Italy) Trento; 27 April 2008	S	W	(Venezuela) Lucelia Blanco; 21.570	(Poland) Edyta Ropek; 23.320	(Ukraine) Olena Ryepko; 20.850
3	(France) Réunion; 2–3 May 2008	B	M	(Austria) David Lama; 4t9 4b5	(Austria) Kilian Fischhuber; 4t9 4b9	(Netherlands) Jorg Verhoeven; 4t9 4b9
3	(France) Réunion; 2–3 May 2008	B	W	(Austria) Anna Stöhr; 4t6 4b5	(Japan) Akiyo Noguchi; 4t10 4b8	(Russia) Yulia Abramchuk; 3t5 4b8
4	(Switzerland) Grindelwald; 30–31 May 2008	B	M	(Russia) Dmitrii Sharafutdinov; 2t5 4b9	(Austria) Kilian Fischhuber; 2t6 3b6	(Austria) David Lama; 1t1 3b3
4	(Switzerland) Grindelwald; 30–31 May 2008	B	W	(Austria) Anna Stöhr; 3t11 4b8	(France) Charlotte Durif; 1t1 4b8	(Japan) Akiyo Noguchi; 1t2 4b14
5	(United States) Vail; 6–7 June 2008	B	M	(Austria) Kilian Fischhuber; 2t2 4b4	(Italy) Gabriele Moroni; 2t2 4b5	(United States) Paul Robinson; 1t1 4b5
5	(United States) Vail; 6–7 June 2008	B	W	(United States) Alex Johnson; 2t5 4b7	(Austria) Katharina Saurwein; 2t7 4b8	(Austria) Anna Stöhr; 2t7 4b10
6	(Italy) Fiera di Primiero; 13–14 June 2008	B	M	(Austria) David Lama; 3t3 4b6	(Austria) Kilian Fischhuber; 3t5 3b3	(Canada) Sean McColl; 3t7 4b6
6	(Italy) Fiera di Primiero; 13–14 June 2008	B	W	(Austria) Anna Stöhr; 4t5 4b4	(Slovenia) Katja Vidmar; 3t4 4b5	(Russia) Yulia Abramchuk; 2t3 3b3
7	(China) Qinghai; 27–28 June 2008	L	M	(Czech Republic) Tomáš Mrázek; 47	(Austria) Jakob Schubert; 41-	(Japan) Sachi Amma; 38-
7	(China) Qinghai; 27–28 June 2008	L	W	(Austria) Johanna Ernst; Top	(Slovenia) Natalija Gros; 43+	(France) Charlotte Durif; 42-
7	(China) Qinghai; 27–28 June 2008	S	M	(China) QiXin Zhong; 7.350	(China) Xiaojie Chen; 8.480	(China) Guangpu Li; 8.220
7	(China) Qinghai; 27–28 June 2008	S	W	(China) Chunhua Li; 10.630	(China) Cuifang He; 13.060	(China) CuiLian He; 11.750
8	(France) Montauban; 4–5 July 2008	B	M	(Russia) Dmitrii Sharafutdinov; 3t4 4b5	(Russia) Rustam Gelmanov; 2t2 4b4	(Austria) David Lama; 2t4 4b7
8	(France) Montauban; 4–5 July 2008	B	W	(Japan) Akiyo Noguchi; 4t5 4b5	(Russia) Yulia Abramchuk; 4t6 4b5	(Slovenia) Natalija Gros; 3t4 3b4
9	(France) Chamonix; 12–13 July 2008	L	M	(Netherlands) Jorg Verhoeven; 42-	(Japan) Sachi Amma; 37	(Slovenia) Klemen Becan; 35
9	(France) Chamonix; 12–13 July 2008	L	W	(Austria) Johanna Ernst; 53	(Austria) Angela Eiter; 43-	(Slovenia) Mina Markovič; 40
9	(France) Chamonix; 12–13 July 2008	S	M	(China) QiXin Zhong; 7.470	(China) Ning ZHANG; 10.440	(Ukraine) Maksym Osipov; 8.750
9	(France) Chamonix; 12–13 July 2008	S	W	(China) Cuifang He; 11.290	(China) Chunhua Li; 11.870	(China) CuiLian He; 12.340
10	(Italy) Val Daone; 19–20 July 2008	S	M	(Poland) Lukasz Swirk; 17.040	(Russia) Evgenii Vaitsekhovskii fall	(Ukraine) Maksym Styenkovyy; 17.110
10	(Italy) Val Daone; 19–20 July 2008	S	W	(Poland) Edyta Ropek; 25.190	(Ukraine) Svitlana Tuzhylina; 27.300	(Russia) Valentina Yurina; 31.360
11	(Switzerland) Bern; 12–13 September 2008	L	M	(Spain) Patxi Usobiaga Lakunza; 32-	(Netherlands) Jorg Verhoeven; 31+	(Czech Republic) Tomáš Mrázek; 31
11	(Switzerland) Bern; 12–13 September 2008	L	W	(Slovenia) Maja Vidmar; 37-	(Austria) Johanna Ernst; 37-	(Ukraine) Olga Shalagina; 35-
12	(Austria) Imst; 19–20 September 2008	L	M	(Austria) David Lama; 50+	(Spain) Ramón Julián Puigblanqué; 50	(Canada) Sean McColl; 41+
12	(Austria) Imst; 19–20 September 2008	L	W	(Slovenia) Mina Markovič; 60	(Austria) Johanna Ernst; 60-	(Slovenia) Maja Vidmar; 59+
13	(Belgium) Puurs; 26–27 September 2008	L	M	(Spain) Ramón Julián Puigblanqué; 48-	(Czech Republic) Tomáš Mrázek; 46-	(Netherlands) Jorg Verhoeven; 41-
13	(Belgium) Puurs; 26–27 September 2008	L	W	(Slovenia) Maja Vidmar; 52+	(Slovenia) Mina Markovič; 52+	(Austria) Johanna Ernst; 52
13	(Belgium) Puurs; 26–27 September 2008	S	M	(Venezuela) Leonel De Las Salas; 16.170	(Russia) Evgenii Vaitsekhovskii; 16.250	(Ukraine) Maksym Styenkovyy; 17.980
13	(Belgium) Puurs; 26–27 September 2008	S	W	(Ukraine) Svitlana Tuzhylina; 25.650	(Russia) Anna Stenkovaya; 29.360	(Ukraine) Olena Ryepko; 27.400
14	(Russia) Moscow; 31 October – 2 November 2008	B	M	(Russia) Rustam Gelmanov; 4t5 4b4	(Austria) Kilian Fischhuber; 3t3 3b3	(Ukraine) Stanislav Kleshnov; 2t2 4b4
14	(Russia) Moscow; 31 October – 2 November 2008	B	W	(Austria) Katharina Saurwein; 4t4 4b4	(Slovenia) Natalija Gros (Slovenia) Katja Vidmar; 4t4 4b4	–
14	(Russia) Moscow; 31 October – 2 November 2008	S	M	(Russia) Evgenii Vaitsekhovskii; 16.600	(Venezuela) Manuel Escobar; 18.540	(Russia) Valeriy Vorobyev; 18.170
14	(Russia) Moscow; 31 October – 2 November 2008	S	W	(Ukraine) Olena Ryepko; 27.030	(Poland) Edyta Ropek; 28.870	(Venezuela) Lucelia Blanco; 27.270
15	(Slovenia) Kranj; 15–16 November 2008	L	M	(Slovenia) Klemen Becan; 29	(Netherlands) Jorg Verhoeven; 29-	(Spain) Patxi Usobiaga Lakunza; 26-
15	(Slovenia) Kranj; 15–16 November 2008	L	W	(Austria) Johanna Ernst; Top	(Slovenia) Maja Vidmar; 43-	(Japan) Akiyo Noguchi; 36+
OVERALL		B	M	(Austria) Kilian Fischhuber; 520.00	(Austria) David Lama; 375.00	(Russia) Dmitrii Sharafutdinov; 335.00
OVERALL		B	W	(Austria) Anna Stöhr; 508.00	(Japan) Akiyo Noguchi; 381.00	(Russia) Yulia Abramchuk; 378.00
OVERALL		L	M	(Netherlands) Jorg Verhoeven; 380.00	(Czech Republic) Tomáš Mrázek; 355.00	(Spain) Ramón Julián Puigblanqué; 321.00
OVERALL		L	W	(Austria) Johanna Ernst; 460.00	(Slovenia) Maja Vidmar; 345.00	(Slovenia) Mina Markovič; 325.00
OVERALL		S	M	(Russia) Evgenii Vaitsekhovskii; 411.00	(Russia) Sergei Sinitcyn; 280.00	(China) QiXin Zhong; 273.00
OVERALL		S	W	(Poland) Edyta Ropek; 366.00	(Ukraine) Olena Ryepko; 332.00	(Ukraine) Svitlana Tuzhylina; 327.00
OVERALL		C	M	(Austria) David Lama; 522.00	(Netherlands) Jorg Verhoeven; 489.00	(Czech Republic) Tomáš Mrázek; 383.00
OVERALL		C	W	(Japan) Akiyo Noguchi; 587.00	(Austria) Johanna Ernst; 507.00	(Slovenia) Natalija Gros; 506.00
NATIONAL TEAMS		B	A	Austria; 1775	(Russia) Russian Federation; 1452	France; 1329
NATIONAL TEAMS		L	A	Austria; 1264	Slovenia; 1125	France; 1089
NATIONAL TEAMS		S	A	(Russia) Russian Federation; 1627	Ukraine; 1488	People's Republic of China; 1294
