= 2009 IFSC Climbing World Cup =

International sport climbing competition

- Location: Kazo, Japan Tarnów, Poland; Trento, Italy; Hall, Austria; Wien, Austria; Vail, United States; Eindhoven, Netherlands; Chamonix, France; Daone, Italy; Barcelona, Spain; Imst, Austria; Puurs, Belgium; Brno, Czech Republic Kranj, Slovenia
- Date: 11 April – 15 November 2009

Champions
- Men: (B) (Austria) Kilian Fischhuber (L) (Czech Republic) Adam Ondra (S) (Russia) Sergei Sinitcyn (C) (Czech Republic) Adam Ondra
- Women: (B) (Japan) Akiyo Noguchi (L) (Austria) Johanna Ernst (S) (Poland) Edyta Ropek (C) (Japan) Akiyo Noguchi

The 2009 IFSC Climbing World Cup was held in 14 locations. Bouldering competitions were held in 5 locations, lead in 6 locations, and speed in 4 locations. The season began on 11 April in Kazo, Japan and concluded on 15 November in Kranj, Slovenia.

The top 3 in each competition received medals, and the overall winners were awarded trophies. At the end of the season an overall ranking was determined based upon points, which athletes were awarded for finishing in the top 30 of each individual event.

The winners for bouldering were Kilian Fischhuber and Akiyo Noguchi, for lead Adam Ondra and Johanna Ernst, for speed Sergei Sinitcyn and Edyta Ropek, and for combined Adam Ondra and Akiyo Noguchi, men and women respectively. The National Team for bouldering was France, for lead Austria, and for speed Russian Federation.

== Highlights of the season ==
In bouldering, at the World Cup in Hall, Austria, Akiyo Noguchi of Japan and Anna Stöhr of Austria flashed all boulders in the final round, and because they were tied on countbacks too, they did a super final round where they both also flashed the boulder problem, eventually making them both joint winners.

In lead climbing, at the World Cup in Puurs, Belgium, Johanna Ernst of Austria, Jain Kim of South Korea, and Maja Vidmar of Slovenia were tied in the final round and tied on countbacks too, so they did a super final round where Johanna Ernst took the win.

Adam Ondra of Czech Republic, at age sixteen, made his debut in the World Cup circuit in bouldering competition in Hall, Austria, placing third. He then competed in lead climbing, won 4 out of 6 Lead World Cups and the overall men's lead title of the season. He also won the men's combined title of the season.

== Overview ==
No.	Location	D	G	Gold	Silver	Bronze
1	(Japan) Kazo; 11–12 April 2009	B	M	(France) Stephane Julien; 2t2 3b3	(Japan) Tatsuya Muraoka; 1t1 2b6	(Russia) Rustam Gelmanov; 1t2 2b2
1	(Japan) Kazo; 11–12 April 2009	B	W	(Japan) Akiyo Noguchi; 2t4 3b6	(South Korea) Jain Kim; 2t5 3b6	(Austria) Anna Stöhr; 2t6 2b4
2	(Poland) Tarnów; 18–19 April 2009	S	M	(Russia) Sergei Sinitcyn; 18.560	(Russia) Evgenii Vaitsekhovskii; 20.660	(Ukraine) Maksym Styenkovyy; 2.000
2	(Poland) Tarnów; 18–19 April 2009	S	W	(Russia) Anna Stenkovaya; 32.800	(Poland) Edyta Ropek fall	(Ukraine) Svitlana Tuzhylina; 29.170
3	(Italy) Trento; 25–26 April 2009	S	M	(Russia) Sergey Abdrakhmanov; 7.670	(Hungary) Csaba Komondi; 9.340	(China) QiXin Zhong; 7.410
3	(Italy) Trento; 25–26 April 2009	S	W	(Russia) Anna Stenkovaya; 11.300	(Poland) Edyta Ropek; 13.210	(China) Chunhua Li; 10.920
4	(Austria) Hall; 1–2 May 2009	B	M	(Austria) Kilian Fischhuber; 2t2 3b3	(Italy) Gabriele Moroni; 2t3 3b6	(Czech Republic) Adam Ondra; 2t6 4b8
4	(Austria) Hall; 1–2 May 2009	B	W	(Japan) Akiyo Noguchi (Austria) Anna Stöhr; 1t1 1b1 (super final); 4t4 4b4 (final)	–	(Russia) Yulia Abramchuk; 4t8 4b7
5	(Austria) Wien; 29–30 May 2009	B	M	(Russia) Rustam Gelmanov; 4t5 4b5	(Canada) Sean McColl; 3t4 4b6	(Austria) Kilian Fischhuber; 3t4 3b4
5	(Austria) Wien; 29–30 May 2009	B	W	(Russia) Alexandra Balakireva; 3t4 4b4	(Japan) Akiyo Noguchi; 3t6 4b5	(Austria) Anna Stöhr; 3t7 4b8
6	(United States) Vail; 5–6 June 2009	B	M	(Germany) Jonas Baumann; 4t5 4b4	(United States) Daniel Woods; 4t6 4b5	(Austria) Kilian Fischhuber; 3t4 4b5
6	(United States) Vail; 5–6 June 2009	B	W	(United States) Alex Puccio; 4t6 4b6	(United States) Alex Johnson; 3t3 4b4	(Japan) Akiyo Noguchi; 2t2 4b7
7	(Netherlands) Eindhoven; 12–13 June 2009	B	M	(Austria) Kilian Fischhuber; 4t8 4b7	(Italy) Gabriele Moroni; 2t2 2b2	(France) Stephane Julien; 2t2 2b2
7	(Netherlands) Eindhoven; 12–13 June 2009	B	W	(Japan) Akiyo Noguchi; 3t4 4b6	(Slovenia) Natalija Gros; 3t5 4b8	(Ukraine) Olga Shalagina; 2t2 4b6
8	(France) Chamonix; 12–13 July 2009	L	M	(Spain) Patxi Usobiaga Lakunza; 48-	(Japan) Sachi Amma; 42+	(Austria) David Lama; 41
8	(France) Chamonix; 12–13 July 2009	L	W	(Austria) Johanna Ernst; 26-	(Slovenia) Natalija Gros; 26-	(Russia) Yana Chereshneva; 26-
8	(France) Chamonix; 12–13 July 2009	S	M	(Russia) Evgenii Vaitsekhovskii; 7.350	(Russia) Sergei Sinitcyn; 7.750	(Czech Republic) Libor Hroza; 7.940
8	(France) Chamonix; 12–13 July 2009	S	W	(Poland) Edyta Ropek; 11.000	(Russia) Valentina Yurina; 11.350	(Russia) Kseniia Alekseeva; 10.580
9	(Italy) Daone; 1–2 August 2009	S	M	(Czech Republic) Libor Hroza; 14.940	(Ukraine) Maksym Osipov; 18.510	(Poland) Lukasz Swirk; 15.390
9	(Italy) Daone; 1–2 August 2009	S	W	(Poland) Edyta Ropek; 22.370	(Russia) Anna Stenkovaya; 24.060	(Russia) Valentina Yurina; 24.000
10	(Spain) Barcelona; 8–9 August 2009	L	M	(Czech Republic) Adam Ondra; 47+	(Spain) Ramón Julián Puigblanqué; 47+	(Japan) Sachi Amma; 43.5-
10	(Spain) Barcelona; 8–9 August 2009	L	W	(Slovenia) Maja Vidmar; 71-	(Austria) Angela Eiter (South Korea) Jain Kim; 69	-
11	(Austria) Imst; 21–22 August 2009	L	M	(Czech Republic) Adam Ondra; Top	(Spain) Patxi Usobiaga Lakunza; Top	(Canada) Sean McColl; 48
11	(Austria) Imst; 21–22 August 2009	L	W	(Austria) Johanna Ernst; Top	(Austria) Angela Eiter; Top	(France) Alizée Dufraisse; 40-
12	(Belgium) Puurs; 25–26 September 2009	L	M	(Czech Republic) Adam Ondra; Top	(Spain) Patxi Usobiaga Lakunza; 56-	(France) Manuel Romain; 52+
12	(Belgium) Puurs; 25–26 September 2009	L	W	(Austria) Johanna Ernst; 57+ (super final)	(South Korea) Jain Kim; 51-	(Slovenia) Maja Vidmar; 25-
13	(Czech Republic) Brno; 6–7 November 2009	L	M	(Austria) Jakob Schubert; 42	(Spain) Patxi Usobiaga Lakunza; 34-	(Czech Republic) Tomáš Mrázek; 31
13	(Czech Republic) Brno; 6–7 November 2009	L	W	(South Korea) Jain Kim; 47+	(Slovenia) Maja Vidmar; 47+	(Slovenia) Mina Markovič; 46-
14	(Slovenia) Kranj; 14–15 November 2009	L	M	(Czech Republic) Adam Ondra; 47-	(Japan) Sachi Amma; 44	(Austria) Jakob Schubert; 44-
14	(Slovenia) Kranj; 14–15 November 2009	L	W	(Slovenia) Mina Markovič; 38+	(Japan) Akiyo Noguchi; 37	(Austria) Johanna Ernst; 35-
OVERALL		B	M	(Austria) Kilian Fischhuber; 337.00	(Russia) Rustam Gelmanov; 296.00	(Italy) Gabriele Moroni; 230.00
OVERALL		B	W	(Japan) Akiyo Noguchi; 435.00	(Austria) Anna Stöhr; 309.00	(Slovenia) Natalija Gros; 238.00
OVERALL		L	M	(Czech Republic) Adam Ondra; 451.00	(Spain) Patxi Usobiaga Lakunza; 391.00	(Japan) Sachi Amma; 327.00
OVERALL		L	W	(Austria) Johanna Ernst; 416.00	(South Korea) Jain Kim; 354.00	(Slovenia) Maja Vidmar; 336.00
OVERALL		S	M	(Russia) Sergei Sinitcyn; 270.00	(Russia) Sergey Abdrakhmanov; 245.00	(Russia) Evgenii Vaitsekhovskii; 217.00
OVERALL		S	W	(Poland) Edyta Ropek; 360.00	(Russia) Anna Stenkovaya; 335.00	(Russia) Valentina Yurina; 219.00
OVERALL		C	M	(Czech Republic) Adam Ondra; 547.00	(Japan) Sachi Amma; 343.00	(Slovenia) Klemen Becan; 320.00
OVERALL		C	W	(Japan) Akiyo Noguchi; 615.00	(South Korea) Jain Kim; 523.00	(Austria) Johanna Ernst; 490.00
NATIONAL TEAMS		B	A	France; 1113	Austria; 1022	(Russia) Russian Federation; 860
NATIONAL TEAMS		L	A	Austria; 1332	France; 1184	Slovenia; 1013
NATIONAL TEAMS		S	A	(Russia) Russian Federation; 1565	Poland; 1129	Ukraine; 749
