= 2010 IFSC Climbing World Cup =

International sport climbing competition

- Location: Trento, Italy Greifensee, Switzerland; Wien, Austria; Vail, United States; Moscow, Russia; Eindhoven, Netherlands; Sheffield, United Kingdom; Chamonix, France; Daone, Italy; Munich, Germany; Xining, China; Chuncheon, South Korea; Puurs, Belgium; Huaiji, China Kranj, Slovenia
- Date: 30 April – 14 November 2010

Champions
- Men: (B) (Czech Republic) Adam Ondra (L) (Spain) Ramón Julián Puigblanqué (S) (Russia) Stanislav Kokorin (C) (Czech Republic) Adam Ondra
- Women: (B) (Japan) Akiyo Noguchi (L) (South Korea) Jain Kim (S) (Russia) Yuliya Levochkina (C) (South Korea) Jain Kim

The 2010 IFSC Climbing World Cup was held in 15 locations. Bouldering competitions were held in 7 locations, lead in 6 locations, and speed in 7 locations. The season began on 30 April in Trento, Italy and concluded on 14 November in Kranj, Slovenia.

The top 3 in each competition received medals, and the overall winners were awarded trophies. At the end of the season an overall ranking was determined based upon points, which athletes were awarded for finishing in the top 30 of each individual event.

The winners for bouldering were Adam Ondra and Akiyo Noguchi, for lead Ramón Julián Puigblanqué and Jain Kim, for speed Stanislav Kokorin and Yuliya Levochkina, and for combined Adam Ondra and Jain Kim, men and women respectively.

== Highlights of the season ==
In bouldering, Adam Ondra of Czech Republic won 3 out of 7 bouldering World Cups and then the overall men's bouldering title of the season, making him the first climber to ever win the overall World Cup titles in lead (2009) and bouldering (2010).

In speed climbing, at the end of the season, Russian athletes, Stanislav Kokorin and Yuliya Levochkina clinched the overall titles of the season for men and women respectively, making it double speed titles for Russia.

== Overview ==
No.	Location	D	G	Gold	Silver	Bronze
1	(Italy) Trento; 30 April – 1 May 2010	S	M	(Russia) Evgenii Vaitsekhovskii; 6.930	(Russia) Stanislav Kokorin; 7.200	(Czech Republic) Libor Hroza; 7.370
1	(Italy) Trento; 30 April – 1 May 2010	S	W	(Russia) Yuliya Levochkina; 10.430	(Russia) Kseniia Alekseeva; 12.640	(Poland) Edyta Ropek; 10.930
2	(Switzerland) Greifensee; 14–15 May 2010	B	M	(Austria) Kilian Fischhuber; 4t6 4b6	(Czech Republic) Adam Ondra; 4t6 4b6	(Italy) Christian Core; 1t1 2b4
2	(Switzerland) Greifensee; 14–15 May 2010	B	W	(United States) Alex Johnson; 1t1 4b6	(Japan) Akiyo Noguchi; 1t1 4b7	(Belgium) Chloé Graftiaux; 1t2 4b5
3	(Austria) Wien; 28–30 May 2010	B	M	(Austria) Kilian Fischhuber; 2t2 3b3	(Czech Republic) Adam Ondra; 1t1 3b3	(Russia) Alexey Rubtsov; 1t5 3b8
3	(Austria) Wien; 28–30 May 2010	B	W	(Japan) Akiyo Noguchi; 2t2 3b5	(Japan) Momoka Oda; 2t3 2b3	(South Korea) Jain Kim; 2t4 2b2
4	(United States) Vail; 4–5 June 2010	B	M	(United States) Daniel Woods; 2t4 4b11	(Japan) Tsukuru Hori; 1t1 3b5	(Austria) Kilian Fischhuber; 1t1 3b6
4	(United States) Vail; 4–5 June 2010	B	W	(Belgium) Chloé Graftiaux; 3t3 4b4	(Austria) Anna Stöhr; 3t4 4b5	(Germany) Juliane Wurm; 3t5 4b5
5	(Russia) Moscow; 17–21 June 2010	B	M	(Czech Republic) Adam Ondra; 2t4 4b5	(Japan) Tsukuru Hori; 1t1 4b4	(Austria) Kilian Fischhuber; 1t2 4b4
5	(Russia) Moscow; 17–21 June 2010	B	W	(Austria) Anna Stöhr; 2t2 3b3	(Belgium) Chloé Graftiaux; 2t2 2b2	(South Korea) Jain Kim; 2t4 3b6
5	(Russia) Moscow; 17–21 June 2010	S	M	(Russia) Stanislav Kokorin; 14.030	(Russia) Evgenii Vaitsekhovskii; 14.570	(Ukraine) Maksym Osipov; 16.490
5	(Russia) Moscow; 17–21 June 2010	S	W	(Russia) Yuliya Levochkina; 27.110	(Russia) Olga Evstigneeva fall	(Russia) Mariia Krasavina; 23.260
6	(Netherlands) Eindhoven; 25–26 June 2010	B	M	(Russia) Dmitrii Sharafutdinov; 3t4 4b4	(Canada) Sean McColl; 3t5 4b4	(Austria) Kilian Fischhuber; 3t7 4b4
6	(Netherlands) Eindhoven; 25–26 June 2010	B	W	(Austria) Anna Stöhr; 2t2 3b3	(Germany) Juliane Wurm; 2t5 3b8	(France) Mélissa Le Nevé; 2t6 3b7
7	(United Kingdom) Sheffield; 3–4 July 2010	B	M	(Czech Republic) Adam Ondra; 4t6 4b6	(Switzerland) Cédric Lachat; 4t12 4b9	(Ukraine) Mykhaylo Shalagin; 2t2 3b3
7	(United Kingdom) Sheffield; 3–4 July 2010	B	W	(Belgium) Chloé Graftiaux; 4t7 4b7	(United States) Alex Johnson; 4t8 4b8	(Japan) Akiyo Noguchi; 4t9 4b9
8	(France) Chamonix; 12–13 July 2010	L	M	(Spain) Ramón Julián Puigblanqué; Top	(Spain) Patxi Usobiaga Lakunza; 42-	(Netherlands) Jorg Verhoeven; 41+
8	(France) Chamonix; 12–13 July 2010	L	W	(France) Charlotte Durif; Top	(France) Hélène Janicot; Top	(Slovenia) Maja Vidmar; Top
8	(France) Chamonix; 12–13 July 2010	S	M	(Czech Republic) Libor Hroza; 11.260	(Russia) Sergei Sinitcyn fall	(Russia) Stanislav Kokorin; 7.270
8	(France) Chamonix; 12–13 July 2010	S	W	(Russia) Kseniia Alekseeva; 10.740	(Poland) Edyta Ropek; 11.200	(China) CuiLian He; 10.510
9	(Italy) Daone; 24–25 July 2010	S	M	(Russia) Stanislav Kokorin; 13.920	(Poland) Lukasz Swirk; 14.160	(Russia) Sergei Sinitcyn; 14.580
9	(Italy) Daone; 24–25 July 2010	S	W	(Poland) Edyta Ropek; 25.340	(Italy) Sara Morandi fall	(Ukraine) Olena Ryepko; 26.940
10	(Germany) Munich; 30–31 July 2010	B	M	(Czech Republic) Adam Ondra; 3t3 4b4	(Russia) Dmitrii Sharafutdinov; 2t3 4b5	(Russia) Victor Kozlov; 2t3 3b4
10	(Germany) Munich; 30–31 July 2010	B	W	(Japan) Akiyo Noguchi; 1t1 4b8	(Austria) Anna Stöhr; 1t2 4b7	(Russia) Anna Gallyamova; 0t 3b3
11	(China) Xining; 20–21 August 2010	L	M	(Czech Republic) Adam Ondra; 32-	(Austria) Jakob Schubert; 32-	(France) Gautier Supper; 23-
11	(China) Xining; 20–21 August 2010	L	W	(South Korea) Jain Kim; 53+	(Japan) Yuka Kobayashi; 51+	(Japan) Akiyo Noguchi; 49-
11	(China) Xining; 20–21 August 2010	S	M	(Russia) Sergey Abdrakhmanov; 7.170	(China) Yuhang Zhang; 7.820	(Russia) Evgenii Vaitsekhovskii; 6.640
11	(China) Xining; 20–21 August 2010	S	W	(Russia) Yuliya Levochkina; 10.360	(Russia) Kseniia Alekseeva; 10.540	(China) CuiLian He; 9.800
12	(South Korea) Chuncheon; 28–30 August 2010	L	M	(Spain) Patxi Usobiaga Lakunza; 44+	(Spain) Ramón Julián Puigblanqué; 40-	(Japan) Sachi Amma; 40-
12	(South Korea) Chuncheon; 28–30 August 2010	L	W	(South Korea) Jain Kim; 47-	(France) Caroline Ciavaldini; 38-	(Austria) Angela Eiter; 34-
12	(South Korea) Chuncheon; 28–30 August 2010	S	M	(China) QiXin Zhong; 6.520	(Russia) Evgenii Vaitsekhovskii; 7.520	(Czech Republic) Libor Hroza; 6.750
12	(South Korea) Chuncheon; 28–30 August 2010	S	W	(China) CuiLian He; 10.060	(Russia) Kseniia Alekseeva; 10.500	(China) Xuhua PAN; 10.490
13	(Belgium) Puurs; 24–25 September 2010	L	M	(Spain) Ramón Julián Puigblanqué; 52-	(Austria) Jakob Schubert; 52-	(Czech Republic) Adam Ondra; 49
13	(Belgium) Puurs; 24–25 September 2010	L	W	(South Korea) Jain Kim; 46-	(Belgium) Mathilde Brumagne; 43-	(Austria) Angela Eiter; 40+
14	(China) Huaiji; 29–30 October 2010	L	M	(Austria) Jakob Schubert; 34+	(France) Manuel Romain; 32-	(Germany) Thomas Tauporn; 26
14	(China) Huaiji; 29–30 October 2010	L	W	(South Korea) Jain Kim; 41	(Slovenia) Mina Markovič; 36+	(Slovenia) Natalija Gros; 36
14	(China) Huaiji; 29–30 October 2010	S	M	(China) QiXin Zhong; 6.400	(Czech Republic) Libor Hroza; 6.570	(Russia) Evgenii Vaitsekhovskii; 7.080
14	(China) Huaiji; 29–30 October 2010	S	W	(Poland) Edyta Ropek; 9.760	(China) CuiLian He; 9.810	(Russia) Kseniia Alekseeva; 10.450
15	(Slovenia) Kranj; 13–14 November 2010	L	M	(Spain) Ramón Julián Puigblanqué; Top	(Czech Republic) Adam Ondra; 32	(Austria) Jakob Schubert; 31-
15	(Slovenia) Kranj; 13–14 November 2010	L	W	(South Korea) Jain Kim; 33+	(Slovenia) Mina Markovič; 29-	(Japan) Akiyo Noguchi; 27.5+
OVERALL		B	M	(Czech Republic) Adam Ondra; 515.00	(Austria) Kilian Fischhuber; 450.00	(Japan) Tsukuru Hori; 346.00
OVERALL		B	W	(Japan) Akiyo Noguchi; 455.00	(Austria) Anna Stöhr; 448.00	(Belgium) Chloé Graftiaux; 426.00
OVERALL		L	M	(Spain) Ramón Julián Puigblanqué; 435.00	(Austria) Jakob Schubert; 372.00	(Czech Republic) Adam Ondra; 340.00
OVERALL		L	W	(South Korea) Jain Kim; 500.00	(Slovenia) Mina Markovič; 301.00	(Austria) Angela Eiter; 291.00
OVERALL		S	M	(Russia) Stanislav Kokorin; 455.00	(Russia) Evgenii Vaitsekhovskii; 437.00	(Czech Republic) Libor Hroza; 416.00
OVERALL		S	W	(Russia) Yuliya Levochkina; 461.00	(Russia) Kseniia Alekseeva; 460.00	(Poland) Edyta Ropek; 451.00
OVERALL		C	M	(Czech Republic) Adam Ondra; 800.00	(Austria) Jakob Schubert; 379.00	(Japan) Sachi Amma; 264.00
OVERALL		C	W	(South Korea) Jain Kim; 670.00	(Japan) Akiyo Noguchi; 602.00	(Slovenia) Natalija Gros; 488.00
