= 2009 IFSC Climbing World Championships =

Competition climbing event

- Location: Xining, Qinghai, China
- Date: 30 June – 5 July 2009
- Competitors: 219 from 44 nations

The 2009 IFSC Climbing World Championships, the 10th edition, were held in Xining, Qinghai, China from 30 June to 5 July 2009.

The competitions were held for lead, bouldering, and speed (10m and 15m).

== Medal winners overview ==
| Event | Gold | Silver | Bronze |
|---|---|---|---|
| Men's Lead | (Spain) Patxi Usobiaga Lakunza | (Czech Republic) Adam Ondra | (Austria) David Lama |
| Men's Bouldering | (Russia) Alexey Rubtsov | (Russia) Rustam Gelmanov | (United Kingdom) David Barrans |
| Men's Speed 10m | (China) Zhong Qixin | (Kazakhstan) Alexandr Nigmatulin | (Russia) Ivan Novikov |
| Men's Speed 15m | (China) Zhong Qixin | (Russia) Sergey Abdrakhmanov | (China) Zhang Ning |
| Women's Lead | (Austria) Johanna Ernst | (South Korea) Kim Ja-in | (Slovenia) Maja Vidmar |
| Women's Bouldering | (Russia) Yulia Abramchuk | (Ukraine) Olga Shalagina | (Austria) Anna Stöhr |
| Women's Speed 10m | (China) He Cuilian | (China) He Cuifang | (China) Li Chunhua |
| Women's Speed 15m | (China) He Cuilian | (China) He Cuifang | (China) Li Chunhua |

== Lead ==
=== Men ===
78 athletes attended the men's lead competition.

| Rank | Name | Score |
|---|---|---|
| 1 | (Spain) Patxi Usobiaga Lakunza | Top |
| 2 | (Czech Republic) Adam Ondra | 45- |
| 3 | (Austria) David Lama | 42- |
| 4 | (Japan) Sachi Amma | 41+ |
| 5 | (Canada) Sean McColl | 37+ |
| 6 | (Ukraine) Valeriy Kryukov | 34- |
| 7 | (Switzerland) Cédric Lachat | 32 |
| 8 | (Japan) Tatsumi Nitta | 27- |

=== Women ===
50 athletes attended the women's lead competition.

| Rank | Name | Score |
|---|---|---|
| 1 | (Austria) Johanna Ernst | Top |
| 2 | (South Korea) Jain Kim | Top |
| 3 | (Slovenia) Maja Vidmar | 35- |
| 4 | (Japan) Yuka Kobayashi | 34+ |
| 5 | (Austria) Angela Eiter | 33- |
| 6 | (France) Caroline Ciavaldini | 32 |
| 7 | (Austria) Barbara Bacher | 30+ |
| 8 | (Japan) Akiyo Noguchi | 30 |

== Bouldering ==
=== Men ===
69 athletes attended the men's bouldering competition.

| Rank | Name | Score |
|---|---|---|
| 1 | (Russia) Alexey Rubtsov | 4t5 4b4 |
| 2 | (Russia) Rustam Gelmanov | 4t6 4b4 |
| 3 | (United Kingdom) David Barrans | 4t8 4b6 |
| 4 | (France) Guillaume Glairon Mondet | 3t3 4b5 |
| 5 | (Austria) Kilian Fischhuber | 3t4 4b5 |
| 6 | (Canada) Sean McColl | 3t4 4b5 |

=== Women ===
51 athletes attended the women's bouldering competition.

| Rank | Name | Score |
|---|---|---|
| 1 | (Russia) Yulia Abramchuk | 2t2 4b4 |
| 2 | (Ukraine) Olga Shalagina | 1t1 4b7 |
| 3 | (Austria) Anna Stöhr | 1t1 3b4 |
| 4 | (Slovenia) Mina Markovič | 1t1 3b4 |
| 5 | (Japan) Akiyo Noguchi | 0t 3b3 |
| 6 | (Russia) Anna Gallyamova | 0t 1b1 |

== Speed 10m ==
=== Men ===
52 athletes competed in the men's speed climbing event.

Round of 16
1 | (China) QiXin Zhong
16 | (China) Yuhang Zhang
8 | (Czech Republic) Libor Hroza
9 | (Ukraine) Maksym Styenkovyy
4 | (Russia) Sergey Abdrakhmanov
13 | (China) Guangpu Li
5 | (China) Ning ZHANG
12 | (Poland) Jedrzej Komosinski
2 | (Kazakhstan) Alexandr Nigmatulin
15 | (Russia) Stanislav Kokorin
7 | (Russia) Evgenii Vaitsekhovskii
10 | (Hungary) Csaba Komondi
3 | (Russia) Ivan Novikov
14 | (Russia) Alexander Kosterin
6 | (Russia) Sergei Sinitcyn
11 | (Chinese Taipei) Yeu-Shiang Chang

Quarterfinals
1 | (China) QiXin Zhong
8 | (Czech Republic) Libor Hroza
4 | (Russia) Sergey Abdrakhmanov
5 | (China) Ning ZHANG
2 | (Kazakhstan) Alexandr Nigmatulin
7 | (Russia) Evgenii Vaitsekhovskii
3 | (Russia) Ivan Novikov
6 | (Russia) Sergei Sinitcyn

Semifinals
1 | (China) QiXin Zhong
4 | (Russia) Sergey Abdrakhmanov
2 | (Kazakhstan) Alexandr Nigmatulin
3 | (Russia) Ivan Novikov

Final
1 | (China) QiXin Zhong
2 | (Kazakhstan) Alexandr Nigmatulin
Small final
4 | (Russia) Sergey Abdrakhmanov
3 | (Russia) Ivan Novikov

=== Women ===
34 athletes competed in the women's speed climbing event.

Round of 16
1 | (China) CuiLian He
16 | (Czech Republic) Lucie Hrozova
8 | (Ukraine) Olena Ryepko
9 | (Russia) Olga Morozkina
4 | (Poland) Edyta Ropek
13 | (Russia) Kseniia Alekseeva
5 | (China) Xuhua PAN
12 | (Russia) Natalia Titova
2 | (China) Cuifang He
15 | (Russia) Tatiana Ruyga
7 | (Russia) Valentina Yurina
10 | (Russia) Anna Stenkovaya
3 | (China) Chunhua Li
14 | (Ukraine) Svitlana Tuzhylina
6 | (Russia) Yuliya Levochkina
11 | (Chinese Taipei) Hung Ying Lee

Quarterfinals
1 | (China) CuiLian He
8 | (Ukraine) Olena Ryepko
4 | (Poland) Edyta Ropek
5 | (China) Xuhua PAN
2 | (China) Cuifang He
7 | (Russia) Valentina Yurina
3 | (China) Chunhua Li
6 | (Russia) Yuliya Levochkina

Semifinals
1 | (China) CuiLian He
4 | (Poland) Edyta Ropek
2 | (China) Cuifang He
3 | (China) Chunhua Li

Final
1 | (China) CuiLian He
2 | (China) Cuifang He
Small final
4 | (Poland) Edyta Ropek
3 | (China) Chunhua Li

== Speed 15m ==
=== Men ===
36 athletes competed in the men's speed climbing event.

Round of 16
1 | (China) QiXin Zhong
16 | (Kazakhstan) Mikhail Yekimenko | 8.660
8 | (Russia) Stanislav Kokorin
9 | (China) Xiaojie Chen | 9.160
4 | (Russia) Sergei Sinitcyn
13 | (Ukraine) Maksym Osipov | 8.040
5 | (Russia) Evgenii Vaitsekhovskii
12 | (Hungary) Csaba Komondi | 7.950
2 | (Czech Republic) Libor Hroza
15 | (Chinese Taipei) Jiun-Jie Tzeng | fall
7 | (Poland) Lukasz Swirk | 8.160
10 | (Russia) Sergey Abdrakhmanov
3 | (China) Ning ZHANG
14 | (Poland) Tomasz Oleksy | 7.710
6 | (Poland) Jedrzej Komosinski | 7.800
11 | (Kazakhstan) Alexandr Nigmatulin

Quarterfinals
1 | (China) QiXin Zhong
8 | (Russia) Stanislav Kokorin | 8.170
4 | (Russia) Sergei Sinitcyn
5 | (Russia) Evgenii Vaitsekhovskii | fall
2 | (Czech Republic) Libor Hroza | 7.460
10 | (Russia) Sergey Abdrakhmanov
3 | (China) Ning ZHANG
11 | (Kazakhstan) Alexandr Nigmatulin | 7.410

Semifinals
1 | (China) QiXin Zhong
4 | (Russia) Sergei Sinitcyn
10 | (Russia) Sergey Abdrakhmanov
3 | (China) Ning ZHANG

Final
1 | (China) QiXin Zhong | 6.640
10 | (Russia) Sergey Abdrakhmanov | 7.480
Small final
4 | (Russia) Sergei Sinitcyn | 9.140
3 | (China) Ning ZHANG | 7.520

=== Women ===
23 athletes competed in the women's speed climbing event.

Round of 16
1 | (China) CuiLian He
16 | (Ukraine) Olena Ryepko | fall
8 | (Russia) Olga Morozkina
9 | (Russia) Valentina Yurina | 11.670
4 | (Russia) Kseniia Alekseeva
13 | (Chinese Taipei) Hung Ying Lee | 13.680
5 | (Russia) Yuliya Levochkina
12 | (Ukraine) Svitlana Tuzhylina | 13.500
2 | (China) Cuifang He
15 | (Poland) Edyta Ropek | fall
7 | (Kazakhstan) Dinara Irsaliyeva
10 | (Russia) Natalia Titova | 12.270
3 | (China) Chunhua Li
14 | (Czech Republic) Lucie Hrozova | 13.890
6 | (Russia) Anna Stenkovaya
11 | (Kazakhstan) Tamara Ulzhabayeva | 13.200

Quarterfinals
1 | (China) CuiLian He
8 | (Russia) Olga Morozkina | 12.300
4 | (Russia) Kseniia Alekseeva
5 | (Russia) Yuliya Levochkina | 10.830
2 | (China) Cuifang He
7 | (Kazakhstan) Dinara Irsaliyeva | 11.900
3 | (China) Chunhua Li
6 | (Russia) Anna Stenkovaya | 10.900

Semifinals
1 | (China) CuiLian He
4 | (Russia) Kseniia Alekseeva
2 | (China) Cuifang He
3 | (China) Chunhua Li

Final
1 | (China) CuiLian He | 9.040
2 | (China) Cuifang He | 9.300
Small final
4 | (Russia) Kseniia Alekseeva | fall
3 | (China) Chunhua Li | 9.380
