= 2007 IFSC Climbing World Cup =

International sport climbing competition

- Location: Erlangen, Germany; Tarnów, Poland; Sofia, Bulgaria; Hall, Austria; Trento, Italy; Réunion, France; Imst, Austria; Grindelwald, Switzerland; Zürich, Switzerland; Fiera di Primiero, Italy; Chamonix, France; Val Daone, Italy; Qinghai, China; Puurs, Belgium; Kazo, Japan; Valence, France; Brno, Czech Republic; Kranj, Slovenia
- Date: 30 March – 18 November 2007

Champions
- Men: (B) (Austria) Kilian Fischhuber; (L) (Spain) Patxi Usobiaga Lakunza; (S) (Russia) Sergei Sinitcyn; (C) (Netherlands) Jorg Verhoeven
- Women: (B) (France) Juliette Danion; (L) (Slovenia) Maja Vidmar; (S) (Russia) Tatiana Ruyga; (C) (Slovenia) Natalija Gros

The 2007 IFSC Climbing World Cup was held in 18 locations. Bouldering competitions were held in seven locations, lead in eight locations, and speed in six locations. The season began on 30 March in Erlangen, Germany and concluded on 18 November in Kranj, Slovenia.

The top three in each competition received medals, and the overall winners were awarded trophies. At the end of the season an overall ranking was determined based upon points, which athletes were awarded for finishing in the top 30 of each individual event.

The winners for bouldering were Kilian Fischhuber and Juliette Danion, for lead Patxi Usobiaga Lakunza and Maja Vidmar, for speed Sergei Sinitcyn and Tatiana Ruyga, and for combined Jorg Verhoeven and Natalija Gros, men and women respectively. The National Team for bouldering was France, for lead France, and for speed Russian Federation.

== Highlights of the season ==
In bouldering, at the World Cup in Réunion, Juliette Danion of France flashed all boulders in the final round to take the win.

In speed climbing, Russian athletes, Sergei Sinitcyn and Tatiana Ruyga clinched the overall titles of the season for men and women respectively, making it double speed titles for Russia.

== Overview ==
No.	Location	D	G	Gold	Silver	Bronze
1	(Germany) Erlangen; 30–31 March 2007	B	M	(Ukraine) Mykhaylo Shalagin; 4t5 4b5	(Austria) Kilian Fischhuber; 3t4 3b4	(Germany) Jonas Baumann; 3t5 4b4
1	(Germany) Erlangen; 30–31 March 2007	B	W	(Ukraine) Olga Shalagina; 4t6 4b6	(France) Juliette Danion; 4t11 4b11	(Belgium) Chloé Graftiaux; 2t2 3b3
2	(Poland) Tarnów; 13–14 April 2007	S	M	(Russia) Evgenii Vaitsekhovskii; 1.010 (quali)	(Hungary) Csaba Komondi; 2.000	(Russia) Sergei Sinitcyn; 3.000
2	(Poland) Tarnów; 13–14 April 2007	S	W	(Poland) Edyta Ropek; 1.010 (quali)	(Russia) Anna Stenkovaya; 2.000	(Ukraine) Svitlana Tuzhylina; 3.000
3	(Bulgaria) Sofia; 20–22 April 2007	B	M	(Czech Republic) Tomáš Mrázek; 4t7 4b6	(Russia) Dmitrii Sharafutdinov; 3t4 4b7	(Austria) Kilian Fischhuber; 3t5 4b9
3	(Bulgaria) Sofia; 20–22 April 2007	B	W	(Russia) Yulia Abramchuk; 2t4 4b9	(Japan) Akiyo Noguchi; 2t4 3b4	(Russia) Tatiana Shemulinkina; 2t4 3b5
4	(Austria) Hall; 27–28 April 2007	B	M	(Austria) Kilian Fischhuber; 4t8 4b5	(Netherlands) Jorg Verhoeven; 4t9 4b5	(Japan) Akito Matsushima; 2t7 2b4
4	(Austria) Hall; 27–28 April 2007	B	W	(Ukraine) Olga Shalagina; 3t4 3b3	(Slovenia) Natalija Gros; 3t4 3b3	(Switzerland) Alexandra Eyer; 3t6 4b8
5	(Italy) Trento; 1 May 2007	S	M	(Russia) Anatoly Skripov; 15.400	(Russia) Sergei Sinitcyn; 15.420	(Venezuela) Manuel Escobar; 16.890
5	(Italy) Trento; 1 May 2007	S	W	(Venezuela) Rosmery Da Silva; 23.010	(Russia) Tatiana Ruyga; 23.840	(Russia) Anna Stenkovaya; 23.260
6	(France) Réunion; 4–5 May 2007	B	M	(United Kingdom) Andrew Earl; 4t8 4b8	(France) Jérôme Meyer; 3t3 3b3	(France) Daniel DU LAC; 3t4 4b4
6	(France) Réunion; 4–5 May 2007	B	W	(France) Juliette Danion; 4t4 4b4	(Belgium) Chloé Graftiaux; 2t2 3b3	(Czech Republic) Silvie Rajfova; 1t1 3b6
7	(Austria) Imst; 11–12 May 2007	L	M	(Austria) David Lama; 57-	(Czech Republic) Tomáš Mrázek; 50-	(Spain) Patxi Usobiaga Lakunza; 49+
7	(Austria) Imst; 11–12 May 2007	L	W	(Austria) Angela Eiter; 56+	(Belgium) Muriel Sarkany; 43-	(Austria) Katharina Saurwein; 42-
8	(Switzerland) Grindelwald; 8–9 June 2007	B	M	(Austria) Kilian Fischhuber; 4t6 4b5	(Japan) Akito Matsushima; 3t6 4b6	(Finland) Nalle Hukkataival; 3t6 4b7
8	(Switzerland) Grindelwald; 8–9 June 2007	B	W	(Slovenia) Natalija Gros; 2t2 4b5	(Japan) Akiyo Noguchi; 2t5 4b5	(Austria) Katharina Saurwein; 2t8 4b9
9	(Switzerland) Zürich; 15–16 June 2007	L	M	(Netherlands) Jorg Verhoeven; 52	(Spain) Patxi Usobiaga Lakunza; 45-	(Switzerland) Cédric Lachat; 42-
9	(Switzerland) Zürich; 15–16 June 2007	L	W	(Austria) Angela Eiter; Top	(Slovenia) Mina Markovič; 47-	(United States) Emily Harrington; 47-
10	(Italy) Fiera di Primiero; 22–23 June 2007	B	M	(Russia) Dmitrii Sharafutdinov; 3t11 4b8	(Italy) Gabriele Moroni; 2t6 4b5	(Japan) Akito Matsushima; 2t9 2b2
10	(Italy) Fiera di Primiero; 22–23 June 2007	B	W	(Slovenia) Natalija Gros; 2t7 3b3	(Ukraine) Olga Shalagina; 1t1 2b2	(Japan) Akiyo Noguchi; 1t2 3b3
11	(France) Chamonix; 11–13 July 2007	L	M	(Italy) Flavio Crespi; 47-	(Spain) Ramón Julián Puigblanqué; 43	(Netherlands) Jorg Verhoeven; 28-
11	(France) Chamonix; 11–13 July 2007	L	W	(Slovenia) Maja Vidmar; Top	(Belgium) Muriel Sarkany; 51-	(Russia) Yana Chereshneva; 49-
11	(France) Chamonix; 11–13 July 2007	S	M	(Russia) Sergei Sinitcyn; 23.410	(Russia) Evgenii Vaitsekhovskii; 27.650	(Russia) Alexander Kosterin; 24.830
11	(France) Chamonix; 11–13 July 2007	S	W	(Ukraine) Svitlana Tuzhylina; 43.230	(Russia) Tatiana Ruyga; 48.190	(Russia) Galina Terenteva; 52.520
12	(Italy) Val Daone; 21–22 July 2007	S	M	(Russia) Sergei Sinitcyn; 39.090	(Russia) Evgenii Vaitsekhovskii fall	(Russia) Alexander Kosterin; 40.130
12	(Italy) Val Daone; 21–22 July 2007	S	W	(Russia) Valentina Yurina; 55.610	(Russia) Tatiana Ruyga; 59.180	(Poland) Edyta Ropek; 83.950
13	(China) Qinghai; 11–12 August 2007	L	M	(Czech Republic) Tomáš Mrázek; 56-	(Italy) Flavio Crespi; 54+	(Netherlands) Jorg Verhoeven; 48+
13	(China) Qinghai; 11–12 August 2007	L	W	(Slovenia) Maja Vidmar; 34	(Austria) Angela Eiter; 34-	(Japan) Yuka Kobayashi; 34-
13	(China) Qinghai; 11–12 August 2007	S	M	(Russia) Evgenii Vaitsekhovskii; 17.890	(Russia) Sergei Sinitcyn fall	(Russia) Alexander Kosterin; 18.630
13	(China) Qinghai; 11–12 August 2007	S	W	(Russia) Tatiana Ruyga; 30.370	(Russia) Anna Stenkovaya fall	(Russia) Valentina Yurina; 32.450
14	(Belgium) Puurs; 28–29 September 2007	L	M	(Spain) Ramón Julián Puigblanqué; 68+	(Spain) Patxi Usobiaga Lakunza; 60+	(Netherlands) Jorg Verhoeven; 47-
14	(Belgium) Puurs; 28–29 September 2007	L	W	(Slovenia) Maja Vidmar; 69+	(Austria) Angela Eiter; 67-	(South Korea) Jain Kim; 60-
14	(Belgium) Puurs; 28–29 September 2007	S	M	(Venezuela) Manuel Escobar; 16.700	(Russia) Alexander Kosterin; 17.600	(Russia) Sergei Sinitcyn; 17.060
14	(Belgium) Puurs; 28–29 September 2007	S	W	(Ukraine) Svitlana Tuzhylina; 29.570	(Russia) Anna Stenkovaya; 30.170	(Russia) Tatiana Ruyga; 31.130
15	(Japan) Kazo; 13–14 October 2007	L	M	(Czech Republic) Tomáš Mrázek; 53	(Spain) Ramón Julián Puigblanqué (Spain) Patxi Usobiaga Lakunza; 40	-
15	(Japan) Kazo; 13–14 October 2007	L	W	(Slovenia) Maja Vidmar; 64-	(Spain) Irati Anda Villanueva; 55+	(Slovenia) Natalija Gros; 50-
16	(France) Valence; 2–3 November 2007	L	M	(Spain) Patxi Usobiaga Lakunza; 53-	(Spain) Ramón Julián Puigblanqué; 52-	(Netherlands) Jorg Verhoeven; 47
16	(France) Valence; 2–3 November 2007	L	W	(Slovenia) Maja Vidmar; 47+	(Austria) Angela Eiter; 47	(Slovenia) Natalija Gros; 45+
17	(Czech Republic) Brno; 9–10 November 2007	B	M	(Russia) Dmitrii Sharafutdinov; 3t9 3b5	(Austria) Kilian Fischhuber; 2t4 2b2	(France) Stephane Julien; 1t1 2b2
17	(Czech Republic) Brno; 9–10 November 2007	B	W	(France) Juliette Danion; 4t6 4b4	(Austria) Anna Stöhr; 4t7 4b4	(Ukraine) Olga Shalagina; 1t3 4b4
18	(Slovenia) Kranj; 17–18 November 2007	L	M	(Switzerland) Cédric Lachat; 50	(Italy) Flavio Crespi; 46+	(Czech Republic) Tomáš Mrázek; 40-
18	(Slovenia) Kranj; 17–18 November 2007	L	W	(Slovenia) Maja Vidmar; 42-	(Spain) Irati Anda Villanueva; 36-	(Slovenia) Lucka Franko; 36-
OVERALL		B	M	(Austria) Kilian Fischhuber; 480.00	(Russia) Dmitrii Sharafutdinov; 374.00	(France) Stephane Julien; 267.00
OVERALL		B	W	(France) Juliette Danion; 426.00	(Ukraine) Olga Shalagina; 420.00	(Slovenia) Natalija Gros; 392.00
OVERALL		L	M	(Spain) Patxi Usobiaga Lakunza; 499.00	(Spain) Ramón Julián Puigblanqué; 486.00	(Czech Republic) Tomáš Mrázek; 462.00
OVERALL		L	W	(Slovenia) Maja Vidmar; 634.00	(Austria) Angela Eiter; 513.00	(Belgium) Muriel Sarkany; 401.00
OVERALL		S	M	(Russia) Sergei Sinitcyn; 425.00	(Russia) Evgenii Vaitsekhovskii; 415.00	(Russia) Alexander Kosterin; 322.00
OVERALL		S	W	(Russia) Tatiana Ruyga; 405.00	(Ukraine) Svitlana Tuzhylina; 363.00	(Russia) Anna Stenkovaya; 360.00
OVERALL		C	M	(Netherlands) Jorg Verhoeven; 614.00	(Czech Republic) Tomáš Mrázek; 573.00	(Austria) Kilian Fischhuber; 537.00
OVERALL		C	W	(Slovenia) Natalija Gros; 657.00	(Austria) Angela Eiter; 480.00	(Ukraine) Svitlana Tuzhylina; 391.00
NATIONAL TEAMS		B	A	France; 1571	(Russia) Russian Federation; 1179	Austria; 1084
NATIONAL TEAMS		L	A	France; 1533	Austria; 1421	Slovenia; 1386
NATIONAL TEAMS		S	A	(Russia) Russian Federation; 2215	Venezuela; 1222	Ukraine; 924
