= 2005 UIAA Climbing World Championships =

- Location: Munich, Germany
- Date: 1 – 5 July 2005
- Competitors: 318 from 51 nations

The 2005 UIAA Climbing World Championships, the 8th edition, were held in Munich, Germany from 1 to 5 July 2005. It was organized by the Union Internationale des Associations d'Alpinisme (UIAA). The championships consisted of lead, speed, and bouldering events.

The lead chief route-setter was Donato Lella.

== Medalists ==
Event	Gold	Silver	Bronze
Men's Lead	Tomas Mrazek; Czech Republic	Patxi Usobiaga Lakunza; Spain	Alexandre Chabot; France
Men's Bouldering	Salavat Rakhmetov; Russia	Kilian Fischhuber; Austria	Gerome Pouvreau; France
Men's Speed	Evgenii Vaitsekhovskii; Russia	Maksym Styenkovyy; Ukraine	Sergei Sinitcyn; Russia
Women's Lead	Angela Eiter; Austria	Emily Harrington; United States	Akiyo Noguchi; Japan
Women's Bouldering	Olga Shalagina; Ukraine	Yulia Abramchuk; Russia	Vera Kotasova-Kostruhova; Czech Republic
Women's Speed	Olena Ryepko; Ukraine	Valentina Yurina; Russia	Edyta Ropek; Poland

== Men ==
In men's lead, three climbers topped the route, and so their final standings were decided by their semifinal results.

In men's bouldering, the 38-year-old veteran Salavat Rakhmetov sent all six problems in his first attempts in the final round, claiming the gold. Second place Kilian Fischhuber also sent all six problems, but needed two attempts more than Rakhmetov, while third place Gerome Pouvreau needed 13 attempts to top and 11 attempts to zone all six boulder problems.

In men's speed, Evgenii Vaitsekhovskii won the gold medal, while Maksym Styenkovyy and Sergei Sinitcyn took second and third respectively.

Lead				Bouldering				Speed		
Rank	Name	Score	Result	Rank	Name	Score	Result	Rank	Name	Result
1st place, gold medalist(s)	(Czech Republic) Tomáš Mrázek	Top	8800	1st place, gold medalist(s)	(Russia) Salavat Rakhmetov	6t6 6z6	8400	1st place, gold medalist(s)	(Russia) Evgenii Vaitsekhovskii	5900
2nd place, silver medalist(s)	(Spain) Patxi Usobiaga Lakunza	Top	7040	2nd place, silver medalist(s)	(Austria) Kilian Fischhuber	6t8 6z8	6720	2nd place, silver medalist(s)	(Ukraine) Maksym Styenkovyy	4720
3rd place, bronze medalist(s)	(France) Alexandre Chabot	Top	5720	3rd place, bronze medalist(s)	(France) Gerome Pouvreau	6t13 6z11	5460	3rd place, bronze medalist(s)	(Russia) Sergei Sinitcyn	3835
4	(Switzerland) Cedric Lachat	30.22-	4840	4	(Ukraine) Serik Kazbekov	6t13 6z13	4620	4	(Poland) Tomasz Oleksy	3245
5	(Netherlands) Jorg Verhoeven	29.09+	4488	5	(Finland) Nalle Hukkataival	5t5 5z5	4284	5	(Venezuela) Manuel Escobar	3009
6	(Germany) Timo Preussler	29.09+	4136	6	(France) Daniel Du Lac	5t7 5z6	3948	6	(Russia) Evgueni Minatchev	2773
7	(Ukraine) Serik Kazbekov	27.51+	3784	7	(Russia) Dmitrii Sharafutdinov	5t7 5z7	3612	7	(Russia) Iakov Soubbotine	2537
8	(Ukraine) Maksym Petrenko	11.96-	3520	8	(Switzerland) Cedric Lachat	5t8 6z12	3360	8	(Russia) Alexander Peshekhonov	2360
9	(France) Sylvain Millet	11.24+	3256	9	(Czech Republic) Tomáš Mrázek	4t6 4z6	3108	9	(Ukraine) Kyrylo Shevchenko	2183
10	(Spain) Ramón Julián Puigblanqué	-	2992	10	(France) Jérôme Meyer	4t7 5z9	2856	10	(Ukraine) Vyacheslav Titov	2006
				11	(Japan) Keita Mogaki	3t3 5z10	2604			
				12	(Netherlands) Jorg Verhoeven	3t3 4z5	2352			

== Women ==
In women's lead, Angela Eiter dominated the competition by being the only climber topping the semifinal route and climbing six meters higher than the rest of the competition on the final route. Emily Harrington climbed to second place while 16-year-old Akiyo Noguchi claimed the bronze medal, her first medal in senior competition. The defending champion Muriel Sarkany placed 10th.

In women's bouldering, Olga Shalagina had a clean run by topping all six boulder problems in her first attempts in the final round. Yulia Abramchuk and Vera Kotasova-Kostruhova sent five problems, separated by attempts. The 35-year-old Renata Piszczek from Poland finished 4th, ahead of Anna Stöhr.

In women's speed, Olena Ryepko took the win, and Valentina Yurina and Edyta Ropek claimed second and third place respectively.

Lead				Bouldering				Speed		
Rank	Name	Score	Result	Rank	Name	Score	Result	Rank	Name	Result
1st place, gold medalist(s)	(Austria) Angela Eiter	29.34-	8700	1st place, gold medalist(s)	(Ukraine) Olga Shalagina	6t6 6z6	8800	1st place, gold medalist(s)	(Ukraine) Olena Ryepko	4200
2nd place, silver medalist(s)	(United States) Emily Harrington	23.68-	6960	2nd place, silver medalist(s)	(Russia) Yulia Abramchuk	5t5 6z6	7040	2nd place, silver medalist(s)	(Russia) Valentina Yurina	3360
3rd place, bronze medalist(s)	(Japan) Akiyo Noguchi	23.25+	5655	3rd place, bronze medalist(s)	(Czech Republic) Vera Kotasova-Kostruhova	5t9 6z9	5720	3rd place, bronze medalist(s)	(Poland) Edyta Ropek	2730
4	(Ukraine) Olga Shalagina	22.61	4785	4	(Poland) Renata Piszczek	5t9 5z8	4840	4	(China) Cuifang He	2310
5	(France) Caroline Ciavaldini	21.35	4437	5	(Austria) Anna Stöhr	5t10 6z9	4488	5	(Russia) Anna Stenkovaya	2142
6	(France) Sandrine Levet	18.13-	4089	6	(Russia) Olga Bibik	4t4 6z6	4136	6	(Russia) Olesya Saulevich	1974
7	(Slovenia) Natalija Gros	17.73	3741	7	(Russia) Tatiana Shemulinkina	4t6 6z7	3784	7	(Germany) Lisa Knoche	1806
8	(Austria) Katharina Saurwein	17.73-	3480	8	(Russia) Venera Chereshneva	4t6 5z10	3520	8	(Hungary) Lenke Kucsera	1680
9	(Russia) Yana Chereshneva	17.05+	3219	9	(Spain) Esther Cruz Montalban	4t8 6z18	3256	9	(Ukraine) Olga Zakharova	1554
10	(Belgium) Muriel Sarkany	16.51-	2958	10	(France) Corinne Theroux	4t8 4z7	2992	10	(Venezuela) Lucelia Blanco	1428
				11	(United States) Elizabeth Asher	4t8 4z8	2728			
				12	(South Korea) Jain Kim	3t3 6z9	2464			
				13	(Russia) Yana Chereshneva	3t4 5z	2288			
