= Sport climbing at the 2005 World Games – Men's lead =

Sport climbing - Men's lead at the 2005 World Games
- Venue: Landschaftspark Duisburg-Nord, Duisburg, Germany
- Dates: 23 July 2005
- Competitors: 8 from 7 nations

Medalists
gold medal	(Spain) Patxi Usobiaga
silver medal	(Czech Republic) Tomáš Mrázek (France) Alexandre Chabot

The men's lead competition in sport climbing at the 2005 World Games took place on 23 July 2005 at the Landschaftspark Duisburg-Nord in Duisburg, Germany.

== Competition format ==
A total of 8 athletes entered the competition. Best six athletes from preliminary advances to the final.

== Results ==
=== Preliminary round ===
Rank	Athlete	Nation	Result	Note
1	Tomáš Mrázek	Czech Republic	Top	Q
1	Alexandre Chabot	France	Top	Q
1	Ramón Julián Puigblanqué	Spain	Top	Q
1	Patxi Usobiaga	Spain	Top	Q
5	Vadim Vinokur	United States	31	Q
6	Daniel Jung	Germany	25+	Q
7	Son Sang-won	South Korea	25	
8	James Cassay	Australia	24+	

=== Final ===
Rank	Athlete	Nation	Result
1st place, gold medalist(s)	Patxi Usobiaga	Spain	33–
2nd place, silver medalist(s)	Tomáš Mrázek	Czech Republic	31+
2nd place, silver medalist(s)	Alexandre Chabot	France	31+
4	Vadim Vinokur	United States	29+
5	Daniel Jung	Germany	14–
6	Ramón Julián Puigblanqué	Spain	12–
