= Sport climbing at the 2005 World Games – Women's lead =

Sport climbing - Women's lead at the 2005 World Games
- Venue: Landschaftspark Duisburg-Nord, Duisburg, Germany
- Dates: 23 July 2005
- Competitors: 8 from 8 nations

Medalists
| gold medal | (Austria) Angela Eiter |
| silver medal | (Slovenia) Natalija Gros |
| bronze medal | (Germany) Marietta Uhden |

The women's lead competition in sport climbing at the 2005 World Games took place on 23 July 2005 at the Landschaftspark Duisburg-Nord in Duisburg, Germany.

== Competition format ==
A total of 8 athletes entered the competition. The best six athletes from the preliminary advanced to the finals.

== Results ==
=== Preliminary round ===
| Rank | Athlete | Nation | Result | Note |
|---|---|---|---|---|
| 1 | Angela Eiter | Austria | Top | Q |
| 2 | Kim Ja-in | South Korea | 39– | Q |
| 3 | Natalija Gros | Slovenia | 35 | Q |
| 4 | Marietta Uhden | Germany | 28 | Q |
| 5 | Muriel Sarkany | Belgium | 28– | Q |
| 6 | Francis Rodriguez | Venezuela | 27– | Q |
| 7 | Samantha Berry | Australia | 21 | |
| 8 | Emily Harrington | United States | 19– | |

=== Final ===
| Rank | Athlete | Nation | Result |
|---|---|---|---|
| 1st place, gold medalist(s) | Angela Eiter | Austria | 45+ |
| 2nd place, silver medalist(s) | Natalija Gros | Slovenia | 43– |
| 3rd place, bronze medalist(s) | Marietta Uhden | Germany | 36– |
| 4 | Kim Ja-in | South Korea | 28– |
| 5 | Muriel Sarkany | Belgium | 28– |
| 6 | Francis Rodrigues | Venezuela | 19 |
