= 2012 IFSC Climbing World Championships =

- Location: Paris, France
- Date: 12–16 September 2012
- Competitors: 331 from 56 nations

The 2012 IFSC Climbing World Championships, the 12th edition, were held in Paris, France, from 12 to 16 September 2012.

== Medal winners overview ==
Event	Gold	Silver	Bronze
Men's Lead	(Austria) Jakob Schubert	(Canada) Sean McColl	(Czech Republic) Adam Ondra
Men's Bouldering	(Russia) Dmitri Sarafutdinov	(Austria) Kilian Fischhuber	(Russia) Rustam Gelmanov
Men's Speed	(China) QiXin Zhong	(Czech Republic) Libor Hroza	(Russia) Dmitrii Timofeev
Men's Combined	(Canada) Sean McColl	(Germany) Thomas Tauporn	(Switzerland) Cédric Lachat
Women's Lead	(Austria) Angela Eiter	(South Korea) Jain Kim	(Austria) Johanna Ernst
Women's Bouldering	(France) Mélanie Sandoz	(Russia) Olga Iakovleva	(Austria) Anna Stöhr
Women's Speed	(Russia) Yuliya Levochkina	(Russia) Iuliia Kaplina	(Russia) Natalia Titova
Women's Combined	(South Korea) Jain Kim	(France) Cecile Avezou	(Switzerland) Petra Klingler

== Lead ==
=== Women ===
65 athletes attended the women's lead competition.

Rank	Name	Score
1	(Austria) Angela Eiter	48+
2	(South Korea) Jain Kim	44+
3	(Austria) Johanna Ernst	42+
4	(Japan) Momoka Oda	42+
5	(France) Charlotte Durif	42+
6	(Sweden) Matilda Söderlund	39+
7	(France) Hélène Janicot	30+
8	(Russia) Evgeniia Malamid	30+

=== Men ===
102 athletes attended the men's lead competition.

Rank	Name	Score
1	(Austria) Jakob Schubert	52+
2	(Canada) Sean McColl	47+
3	(Czech Republic) Adam Ondra	41+
4	(Spain) Ramón Julián Puigblanqué	39
5	(Netherlands) Jorg Verhoeven	38+
6	(France) Romain Desgranges	35+
7	(Japan) Sachi Amma	30+
8	(South Korea) Hyunbin Min	30+

== Bouldering ==
=== Women ===
66 athletes attended the women's bouldering competition.

Rank	Name	Score
1	(France) Mélanie Sandoz	3t4 3b4
2	(Russia) Olga Iakovleva	3t6 3b6
3	(Austria) Anna Stöhr	2t3 4b9
4	(France) Cecile Avezou	2t3 3b5
5	(South Korea) Jain Kim	2t3 2b3
6	(Japan) Akiyo Noguchi	2t4 3b5

=== Men ===
114 athletes attended the men's bouldering competition.

Rank	Name	Score
1	(Russia) Dmitrii Sharafutdinov	4t9 4b6
2	(Austria) Kilian Fischhuber	3t3 3b3
3	(Russia) Rustam Gelmanov	3t4 3b4
4	(Canada) Sean McColl	3t5 3b5
5	(Germany) Jan Hojer	2t2 3b3
6	(Japan) Rei Sugimoto	2t3 2b2

== Speed ==
=== Women ===
48 athletes competed in the women's speed climbing event.

Round of 16
1	(Russia) Yuliya Levochkina	9.070
16	(Austria) Alexandra Elmer	fall
8	(Russia) Alina Gaidamakina	9.020
9	(France) Anouck Jaubert	9.650
4	(Russia) Kseniya Polekhina	9.760
13	(Austria) Stefanie Pichler	10.150
5	(Poland) Aleksandra Rudzinska	9.870
12	(Poland) Monika Prokopiuk	10.100
2	(Russia) Iuliia Kaplina	9.300
15	(France) Margot Heitz	13.050
7	(Russia) Mariia Krasavina	10.630
10	(Poland) Edyta Ropek	9.770
3	(France) Esther Bruckner	8.980
14	(China) yang wang	fall
6	(Russia) Natalia Titova	9.470
11	(Poland) Klaudia Buczek	fall

Quarterfinals
1	(Russia) Yuliya Levochkina	8.670
8	(Russia) Alina Gaidamakina	8.920
4	(Russia) Kseniya Polekhina	9.320
5	(Poland) Aleksandra Rudzinska	11.670
2	(Russia) Iuliia Kaplina	8.800
10	(Poland) Edyta Ropek	8.900
3	(France) Esther Bruckner	10.330
6	(Russia) Natalia Titova	10.160

Semifinals
1	(Russia) Yuliya Levochkina	8.480
4	(Russia) Kseniya Polekhina	9.110
2	(Russia) Iuliia Kaplina	8.560
6	(Russia) Natalia Titova	8.980

Final
1	(Russia) Yuliya Levochkina	8.370
2	(Russia) Iuliia Kaplina	fall
Small final
4	(Russia) Kseniya Polekhina	9.240
6	(Russia) Natalia Titova	9.220

=== Men ===
55 athletes competed in the men's speed climbing event.

Round of 16
1	(Czech Republic) Libor Hroza	7.280
16	(Russia) Stanislav Kokorin	7.890
8	(Russia) Arsenii Shevchenko	7.270
9	(Singapore) Weng Khit, Adriel Choo	7.310
4	(Poland) Marcin Dzieński	7.960
13	(Ukraine) Yaroslav Gontaryk	7.060
5	(Italy) Leonardo Gontero	7.210
12	(Russia) Dmitrii Timofeev	7.170
2	(China) QiXin Zhong	6.690
15	(Poland) Lukasz Swirk	7.180
7	(Ukraine) Danyil Boldyrev	6.590
10	(Venezuela) Manuel Escobar	fall
3	(Russia) Sergey Abdrakhmanov	fall
14	(Russia) Sergei Sinitcyn	6.890
6	(Russia) Evgenii Vaitsekhovskii	6.710
11	(Ukraine) Oleksiy Yurko	8.200

Quarterfinals
1	(Czech Republic) Libor Hroza	8.870
8	(Russia) Arsenii Shevchenko	fall
13	(Ukraine) Yaroslav Gontaryk	6.770
12	(Russia) Dmitrii Timofeev	6.610
2	(China) QiXin Zhong	6.780
7	(Ukraine) Danyil Boldyrev	fall
14	(Russia) Sergei Sinitcyn	6.860
6	(Russia) Evgenii Vaitsekhovskii	7.370

Semifinals
1	(Czech Republic) Libor Hroza	6.800
12	(Russia) Dmitrii Timofeev	fall
2	(China) QiXin Zhong	6.490
14	(Russia) Sergei Sinitcyn	fall

Final
1	(Czech Republic) Libor Hroza	8.980
2	(China) QiXin Zhong	7.330
Small final
12	(Russia) Dmitrii Timofeev	7.680
14	(Russia) Sergei Sinitcyn	fall

== Combined ==
=== Women ===
Rank	Name	Lead		Boulder		Speed		Total points
Rank	Name	Rank	Points	Rank	Points	Rank	Points	Total points
1	(South Korea) Jain Kim	2	100	5	80	41	37	217
2	(France) Cecile Avezou	16	51	4	100	26	55	206
3	(Switzerland) Petra Klingler	27	47	7	65	23	80	192
4	(Kazakhstan) Tamara Ulzhabayeva	53	31	19	47	17	100	178
5	(Austria) Barbara Bacher	9	80	8	55	42	34	169
6	(Italy) Jenny Lavarda	12	65	17	51	43	31	147
7	(Chinese Taipei) Hung Ying Lee	43	35.5	33	37	24	65	137.5
8	(Switzerland) Rebekka Stotz	15	55	27	40	40	40	135
9	(United States) Delaney Miller	31	41.5	45	32.5	33	47	121
10	(Ecuador) Carolina Rosero	31	41.5	45	32.5	37	43	117
11	(Israel) Valeri Kremer	43	35.5	23	43	44	28	106.5
12	(Kazakhstan) Yelena Grunyashina	59	26	49	28	28	51	105
13	(Azerbaijan) Konul Huseynova	59	26	64	24	45	26	76
13	(Azerbaijan) Aysel Sultanova	59	26	57	26	46	24	76
15	(Azerbaijan) Sima Seferova	64	22	65	21	47	21	64
16	(Azerbaijan) Reyhan Mammadova	65	20	65	21	47	21	62

=== Men ===
Rank	Name	Lead		Boulder		Speed		Total points
Rank	Name	Rank	Points	Rank	Points	Rank	Points	Total points
1	(Canada) Sean McColl	2	100	4	100	43	40	240
2	(Germany) Thomas Tauporn	20	55	11	80	38	47	182
3	(Switzerland) Cédric Lachat	13	80	12	65	45	34	179
4	(Italy) Stefano Ghisolfi	16	65	16	51	33	55	171
5	(Kazakhstan) Artyom Devyaterikov	45	43	33	43	26	80	166
6	(Indonesia) Aspar Jaelolo	91	28	97	34	19	100	162
7	(Slovenia) Klemen Becan	23	51	13	55	48	27	133
8	(Ecuador) Andres Quinteros	77	34	99	31	30	65	130
9	(Spain) Marco Antonio Jubes Angarita	33	47	19	47	46	31	125
10	(South Korea) Seungwoon Cho	45	40	101	28	34	51	119
11	(South Korea) Hanwool KIM	55	37	76	40	44	37	114
12	(United States) Shane Puccio	77	31	87	37	40	43	111
13	(Azerbaijan) Cingiz Tagizade	97	24	113	24	48	27	75
14	(Azerbaijan) Ilham Israfilov	97	22	105	26	50	24	72
15	(Azerbaijan) Babek Ibadov	95	26	114	22	52	22	70
