= Sport climbing at the 2009 World Games – Men's speed =

Sport climbing - Men's Speed at the 2009 World Games
- Venue: Shoushan Junior High School, Kaohsiung, Taiwan
- Dates: 18 July 2009
- Competitors: 12 from 8 nations

Medalists
gold medal	(China) Zhong Qixin
silver medal	(Russia) Evgenii Vaitsekhovskii
bronze medal	(Ukraine) Maksym Styenkovyy

The men's speed competition in sport climbing at the 2009 World Games took place on 18 July 2009 at the Shoushan Junior High School in Kaohsiung, Taiwan.

== Competition format ==
A total of 12 athletes entered the competition. In qualification every athlete has 2 runs, best time counts. Top 8 climbers qualified to main competition.

== Results ==
=== Qualifications ===
Rank	Athlete	Nation	Time 1	Time 2	Best of	Note
1	Zhong Qixin	China	7.91	6.92	6.92	Q
2	Sergei Sinitsyn	Russia	7.79	7.66	7.66	Q
3	Evgenii Vaitcekhovskii	Russia	8.42	7.83	7.83	Q
4	Maksym Styenkovyy	Ukraine	9.13	7.95	7.95	Q
5	Łukasz Świrk	Poland	8.03	7.98	7.98	Q
6	Zhang Ning	China	8.07	8.07	8.07	Q
7	Maksym Osipov	Ukraine	8.57	8.25	8.25	Q
8	Lee En-chih	Chinese Taipei	8.48	8.48	8.48	Q
9	Aan Aviansyah	Indonesia	9.20	8.60	8.60	
10	Manuel Escobar	Venezuela	10.10	8.75	8.75	
11	Leonel de Las Salas	Venezuela	10.01	DNF	10.01	
	Campbell Taylor	New Zealand	DNF	DNF	DNF	

=== Competition bracket ===
Quarter-finals
1	(China) Zhong Qixin	7.62
8	(Chinese Taipei) Lee En-chih	8.66
4	(Ukraine) Maksym Styenkovyy	7.76
5	(Poland) Łukasz Świrk	8.27
2	(Russia) Sergei Sinitsyn	8.51
7	(Ukraine) Maksym Osipov	9.14
3	(Russia) Evgenii Vaitcekhovskii	7.32
6	(China) Zhang Ning	7.43

Semi-finals
1	(China) Zhong Qixin	6.94
4	(Ukraine) Maksym Styenkovyy	7.46
2	(Russia) Sergei Sinitsyn	7.88
3	(Russia) Evgenii Vaitcekhovskii	7.41

Finals
1	(China) Zhong Qixin	6.85
3	(Russia) Evgenii Vaitcekhovskii	7.31
Third place
4	(Ukraine) Maksym Styenkovyy	7.50
2	(Russia) Sergei Sinitsyn	7.73
