= Sport climbing at the 2005 World Games – Men's speed =

Sport climbing - Men's Speed at the 2005 World Games
- Venue: Landschaftspark Duisburg-Nord, Duisburg, Germany
- Dates: 22 July 2005
- Competitors: 8 from 5 nations

Medalists
gold medal	(Russia) Alexander Peshekhonov
silver medal	(Russia) Sergey Sinitsyn
bronze medal	(Russia) Evgenii Vaitsekhovskii

The men's speed competition in sport climbing at the 2005 World Games took place on 22 July 2005 at the Landschaftspark Duisburg-Nord in Duisburg, Germany.

== Competition format ==
A total of 8 athletes entered the competition. After preliminary round they compete in the elimination system, in which they had to go 2 routes and their times were cumulated.

== Results ==
=== Preliminary round ===
Rank	Athlete	Nation	Time
1	Alexander Peshekhonov	Russia	20.16
2	Sergei Sinitsyn	Russia	20.60
3	Evgenii Vaitcekhovskii	Russia	20.62
4	Manuel Escobar	Venezuela	23.47
5	Leonel de Las Salas	Venezuela	26.39
6	Patrick Cassiday	United States	26.56
7	Kim Ja-ha	South Korea	32.44
8	Sebastian Hartung	Germany	DNF

=== Competition bracket ===
Quarter-finals
1	(Russia) Alexander Peshekhonov	20.36
8	(Germany) Sebastian Hartung	DNF
4	(Venezuela) Manuel Escobar	21.76
5	(Venezuela) Leonel de Las Salas	DNF
2	(Russia) Sergei Sinitsyn	18.26
7	(South Korea) Kim Ja-ha	37.47
3	(Russia) Evgenii Vaitcekhovskii	18.80
6	(United States) Patrick Cassiday	35.22

Semi-finals
1	(Russia) Alexander Peshekhonov	18.85
4	(Venezuela) Manuel Escobar	DNF
2	(Russia) Sergei Sinitsyn	18.39
3	(Russia) Evgenii Vaitcekhovskii	20.47

Finals
1	(Russia) Alexander Peshekhonov	17.21
2	(Russia) Sergei Sinitsyn	17.32
Third place
4	(Venezuela) Manuel Escobar	20.78
2	(Russia) Evgenii Vaitcekhovskii	19.13
