= Emily Harrington =

American rock climber and mountaineer

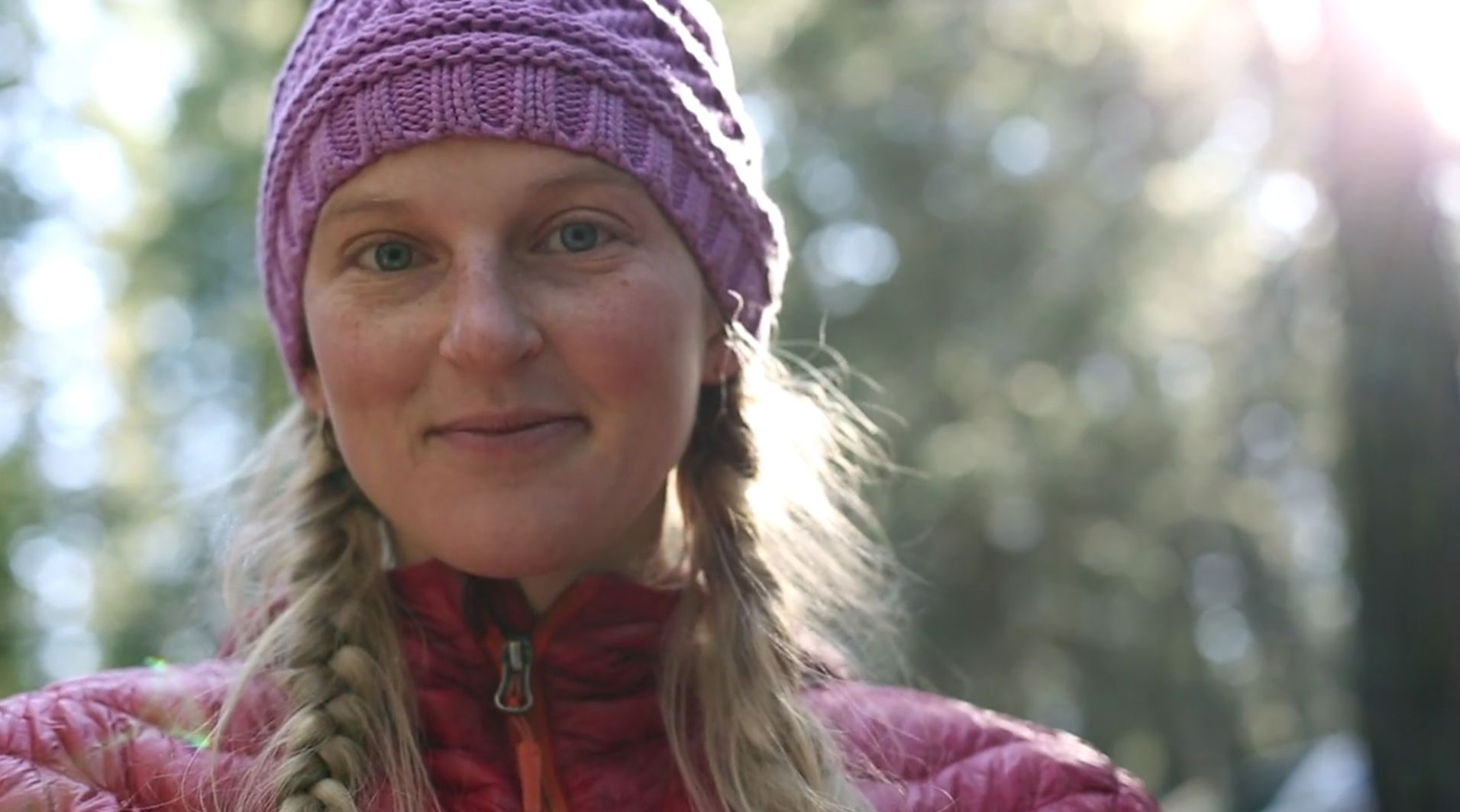
- Harrington in 2015

Personal information
- Born: August 17, 1986 (age 40) Boulder, Colorado, U.S.
- Occupation: Professional rock climber
- Spouse: Adrian Ballinger

Climbing career
- Type of climber: Competition climbing; Sport climbing; Big wall climbing
- Highest grade: Redpoint: 5.14 (8c/+)
Medal record
Women's competition climbing
Representing United States
World Championships
Silver medal – second place	2005 Munich	Lead
World Cup
Bronze medal – third place	2007 Zürich	Lead
US National Championships
Gold medal – first place	2004	Lead
Gold medal – first place	2005	Lead
Gold medal – first place	2006	Lead
Gold medal – first place	2008	Lead
Gold medal – first place	2009	Lead
- Updated on January 5, 2023

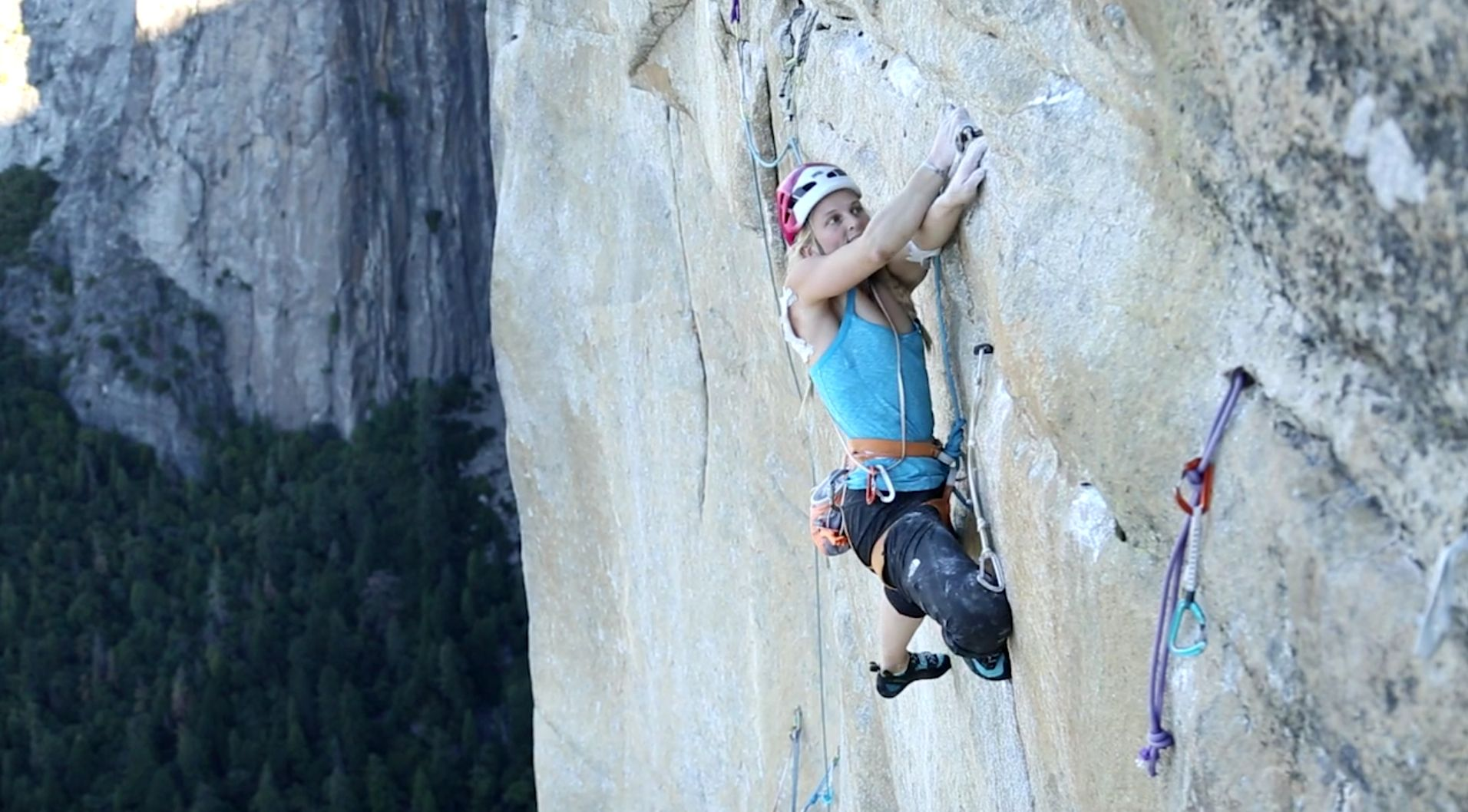
Emily Harrington climbing Golden Gate (5.13 VI) on El Capitan

Emily Harrington (born August 17, 1986) is an American professional rock climber and mountaineer. She is a five-time US National Champion in competition lead climbing, runner-up in the 2005 IFSC Climbing World Championships, and has made the first female free ascents of several 5.14 (8c/+) routes.

== Early life ==
Emily Harrington was born on August 17, 1986, in Boulder, Colorado. Her competitiveness pushed her to develop her climbing skills from an early age. She began climbing artificial walls and competed with her local gym's climbing team. From there, she became a professional competition climber and expanded into the worlds of outdoor rock and mountain climbing, and big wall climbing in particular.

Harrington studied international affairs with an emphasis on politics in Sub-Saharan Africa at the University of Colorado at Boulder. She graduated in 2007 and joined The North Face climbing team in 2008.

== Climbing career ==
Harrington has been the US National Champion in sport climbing five times (2004, 2005, 2006, 2008, 2009). She was also named the North American Sport Climbing Champion twice and placed second in the 2005 IFSC Climbing World Championships. In 2006, Harrington placed first at the Serre Chevalier Invitational. She won first place in 2012 at the Ouray Ice Festival.

In 2012, Harrington was asked to join a joint expedition with The North Face and National Geographic to climb Mount Everest. The expedition marked the beginning of her mountain career. Harrington summited Mount Everest in 2012, and Cho Oyu in 2016.

In 2014, Harrington attempted to climb Hkakabo Razi, the tallest peak in Southeast Asia. This peak had only been climbed once before and Harrington's team intended to create their own route rather than follow that of the previous expedition. Harrington made it to the final route that would reach the summit, a climb that she described as "extremely difficult" and "extremely scary." Ultimately Harrington chose to turn back.

In November 2020, Harrington became the fourth woman (after Lynn Hill, Steph Davis, and Mayan Smith-Gobat) to free-climb the 3,000 ft (910 m) granite wall of El Capitan (and the first woman to do it via the Golden Gate route), in a single day. She completed the mammoth task in 21 hours, 13 minutes and 51 seconds. She was assisted on the ascent by Alex Honnold. The year before, while practicing the El Capitan climb, an accidental 50 ft fall required her to be rescued. During the 2020 climb, Harrington slipped and fell, leaving her with a gash on her forehead. She was also the first woman to free climb Golden Gate on El Capitan in under 24 hours. The media mistakenly reported her achievement as the "first woman" to free climb the mountain in under 24 hours, ignoring the achievements of Lynn Hill, Steph Davis, and Mayan Smith-Gobat on other routes before her; it was later corrected.

In 2021, Harrington achieved the first individual free climb of The American Way route on Pik Slesova in Kyrgyzstan. In 2022 Harrington and Adrian Ballinger were featured as part of HBO's show Edge of the Earth, in which HBO initially claimed they were "Attempting the First Free Climb Ascent of a Route on Pik Slesova in Kyrgyzstan." However, they repeated a free route previously established by the team of Nik Berry, Eric Bissel, Brent Barghan and Dave Allfrey in August 2019. The route was subsequently repeated two weeks after the first ascent.

Harrington has been featured in National Geographic's Adventure blog, Women's Adventure Magazine, Rock & Ice Magazine, Urban Climber, The North Face, The Joe Rogan Experience podcast and Outside Magazine. Harrington has sponsorships with The North Face, La Sportiva, and Petzl.

== Ascents and expeditions ==
- 2012 – Summited Mount Everest with The North Face expedition led by Conrad Anker
- 2013 – Summited Mount Ama Dablam
- 2015 – Free climbed 'Golden Gate' on El Capitan, Yosemite (5.13b, 40 pitches) with support from Adrian Ballinger
- 2016 – Speed-climbed Cho Oyu with Adrian Ballinger
- 2017 – Free climbed Solar Flare (5.12d) with Alex Honnold
- 2020 – Free climbed El Capitan via Golden Gate in a day with Adrian Ballinger and Alex Honnold
- 2021 – First individual to free climb The American Way route on Pik Slesova

== Awards ==
- US National Sport Climbing Champion x5
- North American Sport Climbing Champion x2
- 2005 World Champion-Runner Up
- 2006 Serre Chavalier Invitational Champion
- 2012 Ouray Ice Festival Champion
- 2013 Ouray Ice Festival, 3rd place finisher

== Personal life ==
Emily has been in a relationship with Adrian Ballinger since 2012; they were married on December 11, 2021, in Ecuador. Emily and Adrian met on a climb of Mount Everest. They live in Olympic Valley, California. They have a child, Aaro Storm, born November 25, 2022.
