= Zhong Qixin =

Chinese speed climber (born 1989)

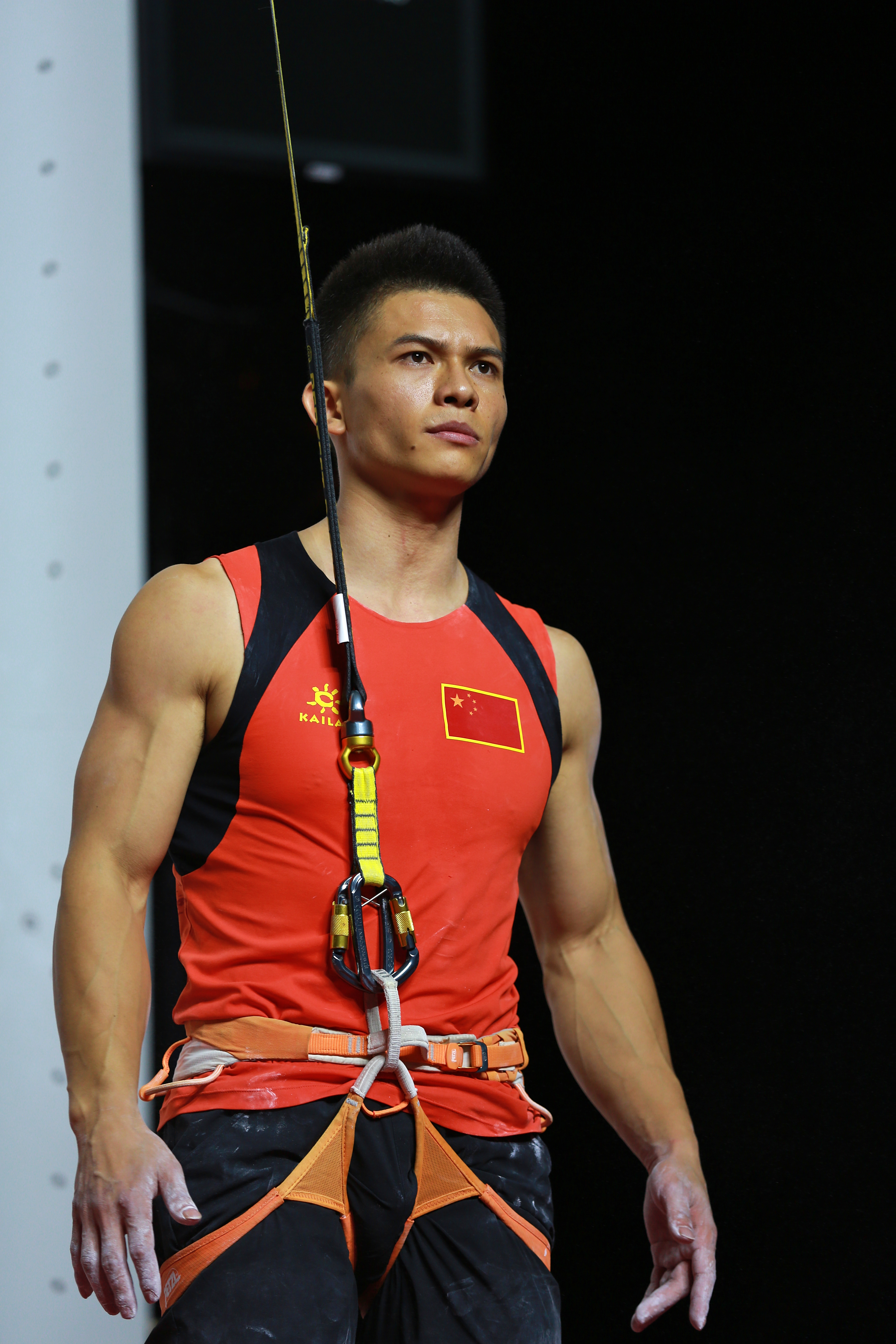
- Qixin in 2018

Personal information
- Nationality: Chinese
- Born: 7 April 1989 (age 37) Quannan County, China

Sport
- Sport: Competition climbing
- Event: Speed
Medal record
Men's competition climbing
Representing China
Event	1st	2nd	3rd
World Championship	4	–	–
World Games	1	–	1
Asian Games	–	1	–
World Cup	1	–	–
World Championships
Gold medal – first place	2007 Avilés	Speed
Gold medal – first place	2009 Xining	Speed
Gold medal – first place	2011 Arco	Speed
Gold medal – first place	2012 Paris	Speed
World Games
Gold medal – first place	2009 Kaohsiung	Speed
Bronze medal – third place	2013 Cali	Speed
Asian Games
Silver medal – second place	2018 Palembang	Speed
World Cup
Gold medal – first place	2015	Speed

Zhong Qixin (born 7 April 1989) is a Chinese former competition speed climber. He is a four-time winner of the IFSC World Championships, taking four consecutive wins between 2007 and 2012. He also won the overall title of the 2015 World Cup. In August 2011, he set the world speed climbing record in 6.26 seconds, which stood until October 2012, when it was broken by Evgenii Vaitcekhovskii.

His 13th and final World Cup victory came in October 2019 in Xiamen, where he missed the world record held by Reza Alipour by just one hundredth of a second with a time of 5.48 seconds. After retiring in 2021, Zhong took over the position as head coach of the Chinese national speed climbing team.

He is married and is the father of twin daughters.

== See also ==
- Rankings of most career IFSC gold medals
