= Maksym Styenkovyy =

Ukrainian speed climber (born 1982)

Personal information
- Native name: Максим Вікторович Стенковий
- Full name: Maksym Viktorovych Styenkovyy
- Nationality: Ukrainian
- Born: 16 August 1982 (age 44) Nikopol, Ukraine

Sport
- Country: Ukraine
- Sport: Competition climbing
- Event: Speed
Medal record
Men's competition climbing
Representing Ukraine
Event	1st	2nd	3rd
World Championship	2	1	-
World Games	-	-	1
World Cup	1	1	–
European Championships	2	1	1
World Championships
Gold medal – first place	2001 Winterthur	Speed
Gold medal – first place	2003 Chamonix	Speed
Silver medal – second place	2005 Munich	Speed
World Games
Bronze medal – third place	2009 Kaohsiung	Speed
World Cup
Gold medal – first place	2001	Speed
Silver medal – second place	2002	Speed
European Championships
Gold medal – first place	2000 Munich	Speed
Gold medal – first place	2002 Chamonix	Speed
Silver medal – second place	2004 Lecco	Speed
Bronze medal – third place	2008 Paris	Speed

Maksym Viktorovych Styenkovyy (Ukrainian: Максим Вікторович Стенковий; born 16 August 1982) is a Ukrainian former competition speed climber. He is a two-time winner of the IFSC World Championships, a two time European Champion. He also won the overall title of the 2001 IFSC Climbing World Cup, finishing runner-up the following year.

== See also ==
- Rankings of most career IFSC gold medals
