= Evgeny Vaitcekhovsky =

Russian speed climber (born 1986)

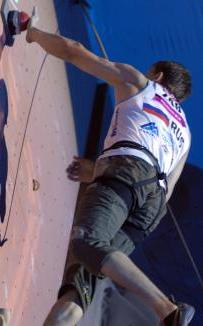

Personal information
- Native name: Евгений Владимирович Вайцеховский
- Full name: Evgeny Vladimirovich Vaitcekhovsky
- Nationality: Russia
- Born: 12 May 1986 (age 40) Kirovo-Chepetsk, Russia

Sport
- Sport: Competition climbing
- Event: Speed
Medal record
Men's competition climbing
Representing Russia
Event	1st	2nd	3rd
World Championship	1	–	–
World Games	–	1	1
World Cup	3	3	1
European Championships	2	–	–
World Championships
Gold medal – first place	2005 Munich	Speed
World Games
Silver medal – second place	2009 Kaohsiung	Speed
Bronze medal – third place	2005 Duisburg	Speed
European Championships
Gold medal – first place	2006 Yekaterinburg	Speed
Gold medal – first place	2008 Paris	Speed
World Cup
Gold medal – first place	2005	Speed
Gold medal – first place	2006	Speed
Gold medal – first place	2008	Speed
Silver medal – second place	2004	Speed
Silver medal – second place	2007	Speed
Silver medal – second place	2010	Speed
Bronze medal – third place	2009	Speed

Evgeny Vladimirovich Vaitcekhovsky (Russian: Евгений Владимирович Вайцеховский; born 12 May 1986) is a Russian former competition speed climber. He won the 2005 IFSC World Championships, the European Championships in 2006 and 2008 and the Rock Master in 2007. He also took three overall titles in the world cup, in addition to 14 individual victories and four other overall podium finishes. In October 2012, he set the world speed climbing record in 5.88 seconds, which stood until August 2014.

== See also ==
- Rankings of most career IFSC gold medals
