= Angela Eiter =

Austrian professional climber (born 1986)

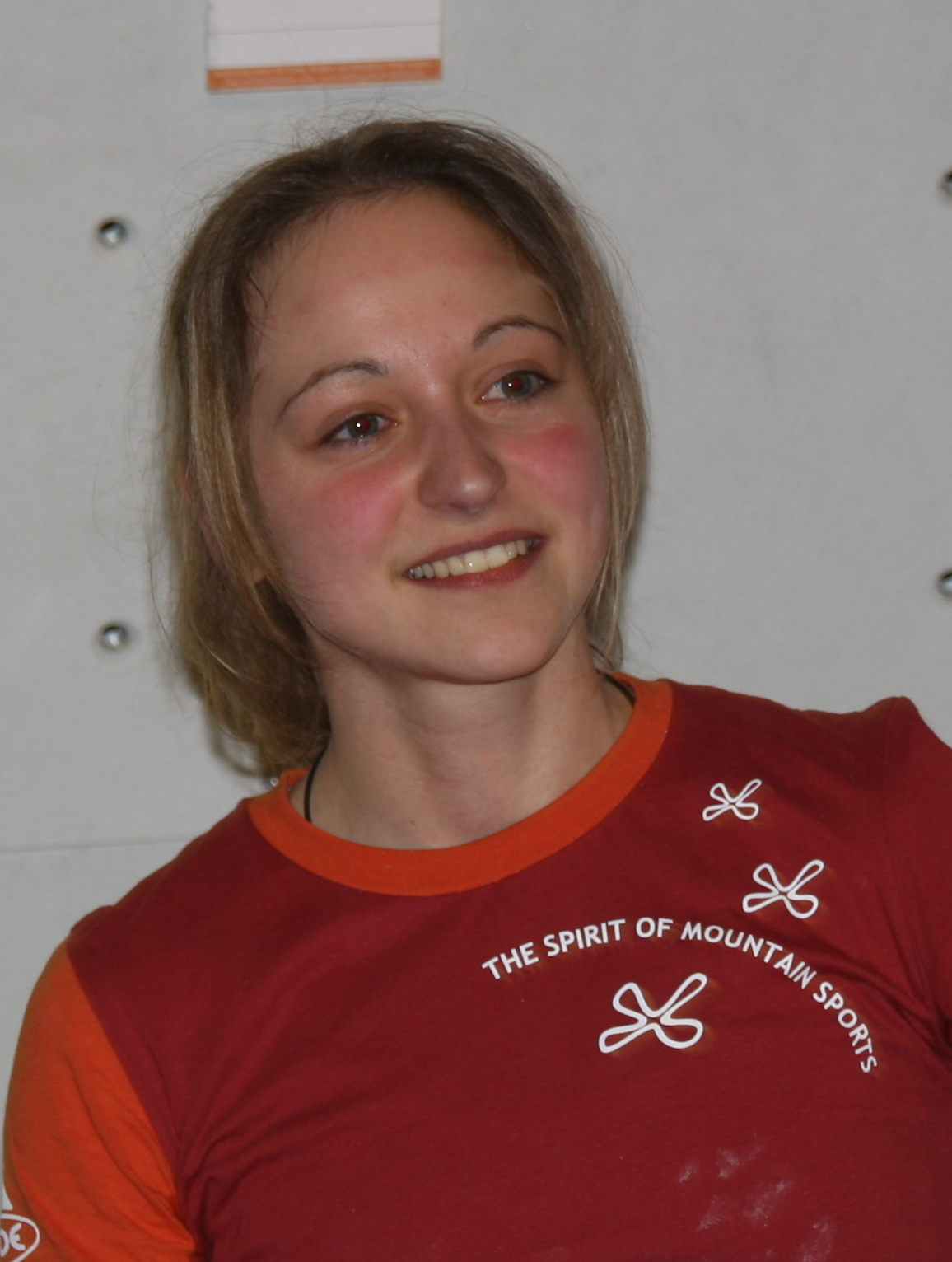

Personal information
- Nickname: Angy
- Nationality: Austrian
- Born: 27 January 1986 (age 40) Arzl im Pitztal, Austria
- Occupation: Professional rock climber
- Height: 154 cm (5 ft 1 in)
- Weight: 46 kg (101 lb)
- Website: angelaeiter.com

Climbing career
- Type of climber: Competition climbing; Sport climbing; Bouldering
- Highest grade: Redpoint: 9b (5.15b); Onsight/Flash: 8b (5.13d); Bouldering: 8B (V13)
- First ascents: Madame Ching (9b, 2020)
- Known for: Winning 3 World Cup, and 4 World Championships; First woman to climb 9b (5.15b); First woman to do an first free ascent at 9b (5.15b)
Medal record
Women's competition climbing
Representing Austria
World Games
Gold medal – first place	2005 Duisburg	Lead
World Championships
Gold medal – first place	2005 Munich	Lead
Gold medal – first place	2007 Avilés	Lead
Gold medal – first place	2011 Arco	Lead
Gold medal – first place	2012 Paris	Lead
World Cup
Winner	2004	Lead
Winner	2005	Lead
Winner	2006	Lead
Winner	2006	Combined
European Championships
Gold medal – first place	2010 Imst/Innsbruck	Lead
Rock Master
Winner	2003	Lead
Winner	2004	Lead
Winner	2005	Lead
Winner	2007	Lead
Winner	2009	Lead
Winner	2012	Lead
- Updated on 8 May 2013

Angela "Angy" Eiter (born 27 January 1986 in Arzl im Pitztal) is an Austrian professional rock climber who specialises in competition climbing and sport climbing. In competition lead climbing, she won three IFSC World Cups in a row (2004–2006), and four IFSC World Championships. In 2011, she achieved her 25th win in World Cup and her 42nd podium. She is also one of the strongest sport climbers in the world, and in 2017, became the first woman to climb a 9b (5.15b) route, La Planta de Shiva. In 2020, she became the first woman to complete the first free ascent (FFA) of a 9b (5.15b) route, Madame Ching.

== Climbing career ==
=== Competition climbing ===
Eiter started climbing at age eleven when her school offered her the chance to try the sport. Her parents accompanied her to the climbing gym in Imst. At fifteen, she climbed her first indoor 8a (5.13b). In 2002, having reached the age of sixteen, she began to participate in the World Cup lead climbing.

In 2003, she won her first Cup race at Aprica. Since then she has won three World Cups in a row: in 2004, in 2005, winning eight out of nine events and in 2006, winning seven out of ten events. She won four world championships in the competition lead climbing specialty: the 2005 edition in Munich, the 2007 edition in Avilés, the 2011 edition in Arco, and the 2012 edition in Paris.

For her achievements, she was awarded the La Sportiva Competition Award in 2006.

In September 2008, during the third round of the World Cup in Bern, she had a serious accident damaging her left shoulder, for which she underwent arthroscopic surgery. She had to prematurely end the season and deal with nine months' rehabilitation. She started to compete the following July at the Climbing World Championship 2009 in Qinghai.

=== Rock climbing ===
On September 6, 2014, Eiter climbed the 9a (5.14d) route Hades at Nassereith, Austria. She is the sixth woman to climb this grade or higher. On October 22, 2017, she climbed La Planta de Shiva (Villanueva del Rosario, Spain), widely considered to be a 9b (5.15b) route, becoming the first woman to climb at grade. In 2020, she did the first free ascent (FFA) of Madame Ching (which she named after Ching Shih) in Imst, Austria, and suggested the grade of 9b (5.15b) for it, which would make it the first female FFA at that grade.

== Rankings ==
=== Climbing World Cup ===
Discipline	2002	2003	2004	2005	2006	2007	2008	2009	2010	2011	2012
Lead	18	3	1	1	1	2	13	4	3	4	35
Bouldering	-	-	-	-	15	33	-	-	-	-	-
Combined	-	-	-	-	1	2	-	-	-	-	-

=== Climbing World Championships ===
Discipline	2003	2005	2007	2009	2011	2012
Lead	7	1	1	5	1	1
Bouldering	-	-	8	-	-	-

=== Climbing European Championships ===
Discipline	2004	2006	2010
Lead	6	5	1

== Number of medals in the Climbing World Cup ==
=== Lead ===
Season	Gold	Silver	Bronze	Total
2002				0
2003	2	3		5
2004	4	1		5
2005	8	1		9
2006	7	1	1	9
2007	2	3		5
2008		1		1
2009		2		2
2010			2	2
2011	2	1	1	4
Total	25	13	4	42

== Notable ascents ==
=== Redpointed routes ===
9b (5.15b):

- La Planta de Shiva - Villanueva del Rosario (ESP) - October 22, 2017 - first female ascent of a 9b route.
- Madame Ching - Tyrol (AUT) - December 2020 - first 9b route created by a woman.

9a (5.14d):

- Pure Dreaming - Arco (ITA) - June 2019
- Era Vella - Margalef (ESP) - April 2015
- Big Hammer - Pinswang (AUT) - November 2014
- Hades - Götterwandl (AUT) - September 6, 2014

8c+ (5.14c):

- Hercules - Götterwandl (AUT) - October 2014 - First ascent
- Ingravids Extension - Santa Linya (ESP) - November 2010
- Claudio Café - Terra Promessa (ITA) - 2007

8c (5.14b):

- White Zombie - Baltzola Cave (ESP) - 2009
- Strelovod - Misja Pec (SLO) - 2008
- Bodybuilding - Bürs (AUT) - 2007
- Nobody is Perfect - Bürs (AUT) - 2007

=== Onsighted routes ===
8b (5.13d):

- Skyline - Bürs (AUT) - 2006

=== Boulder problems ===
8B (V13):

- Fragile steps - Rocklands (ZAF) - August 2014

== See also ==
- List of grade milestones in rock climbing
- History of rock climbing
- Rankings of most career IFSC gold medals
