= Anna Stöhr =

Austrian rock climber (born 1988)

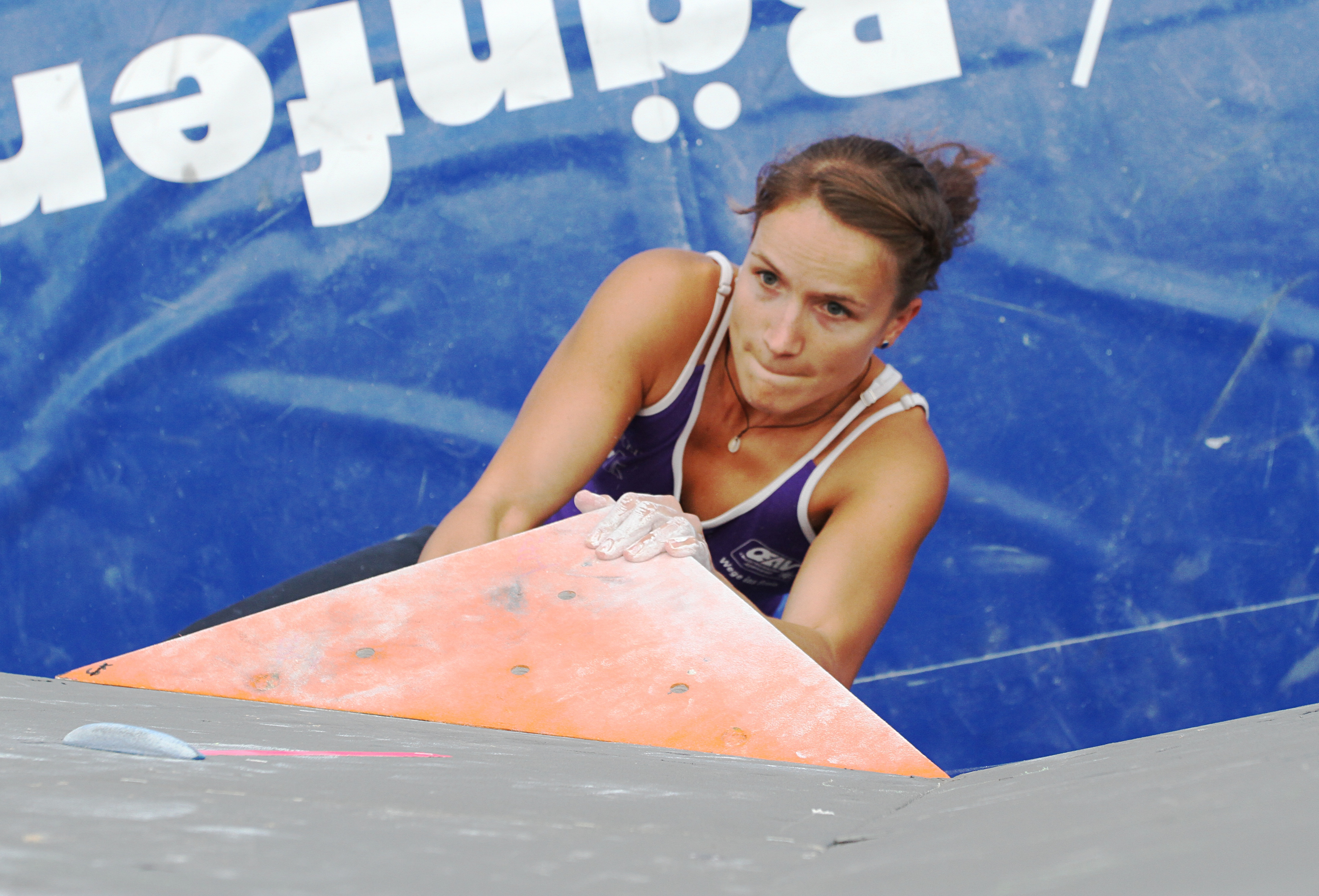
- Stöhr competing in the bouldering Worldcup 2012 in Munich

Personal information
- Born: 25 April 1988 (age 38) Reith im Alpbachtal, Austria
- Height: 163 cm (5 ft 4 in)
- Weight: 53 kg (117 lb)

Climbing career
- Type of climber: Boulderer
- Highest grade: Bouldering: 8B+ (V14)
- Known for: Winning 4 World Cups and 2 World Championships
Medal record
Women's competition climbing
Representing Austria
World Championships
Gold medal – first place	2007 Avilés	Bouldering
Gold medal – first place	2011 Arco	Bouldering
Bronze medal – third place	2009 Xining	Bouldering
Bronze medal – third place	2012 Paris	Bouldering
World Cup
Third place	2006	Bouldering
Winner	2008	Bouldering
Second place	2009	Bouldering
Second place	2010	Bouldering
Winner	2011	Bouldering
Winner	2012	Bouldering
Winner	2013	Bouldering
Third place	2014	Bouldering
European Championships
Gold medal – first place	2010	Bouldering
Gold medal – first place	2013	Bouldering
Silver medal – second place	2004	Bouldering
Silver medal – second place	2008	Bouldering
Silver medal – second place	2015	Bouldering
Rock Master
Gold medal – first place	2006	Bouldering
Gold medal – first place	2007	Bouldering
Gold medal – first place	2010	Bouldering
- Updated on 31 July 2017

Anna Stöhr (born 25 April 1988 in Reith im Alpbachtal, Austria) is a professional climber. She is a champion in bouldering climbing competitions. She won four Bouldering World Cups, in 2008, 2011, 2012 and 2013 and two World Championships, in 2007 and 2011. Notably, she dominated the 2013 Bouldering World Cup series, by winning seven events out of eight, losing one just by one attempt to Juliane Wurm.

== Climbing career ==
=== Competition climbing ===
Stöhr started climbing with her parents when she was a child.

In 2002, she started competing in the youth competition speed, competition lead, and competition bouldering disciplines. In 2002, she won the silver medal in speed Youth B at the IFSC Climbing World Youth Championships in Canteleu, France. From 2002 to 2005, she competed in the IFSC European Youth Cup in lead, taking the third place in 2002, the second place in 2003, the fourth place in 2004 and the first place in 2005.

In 2004, at age sixteen, she started to compete in the senior categories. In 2004 and 2005 she competed in both the lead and bouldering World Cup, and starting in 2006 she focused only on bouldering, where she achieved her greatest success. Her first podium came in 2005 in Moscow and her first victory in 2006 in Grindelwald. In 2007, she won her first World Championship title, in Avilés, Spain, and in 2008 her first Bouldering World Cup title.

In 2011, Stohr won both the World Championship in Arco, Italia, and the World Cup title. In 2012, she won her third World Cup Title and in 2013 her fourth title, winning seven events out of eight.

=== Rock climbing ===
In 2018, in Magic Wood in Switzerland, Stöhr achieved her highest grade on natural rock, with the ascent of New Base Line (V14/8B+). In 2010, she climbed The Riverbed, 8B (V13), the second-ever female ascent of an 8B (V13) boulder in history, after Angie Payne in August 2010.

== Rankings ==
=== Climbing World Cup ===
	2004	2005	2006	2007	2008	2009	2010	2011	2012	2013	2014	2015	2016	2017
Lead	18	46	-	-	-	-	-	-	-	-	-	-	-	-
Bouldering	22	5	3	20	1	2	2	1	1	1	3	8	12	15
Combined	11	6	-	-	-	-	-	-	-	-	-	-	-	45

=== Climbing World Championships ===
	2005	2007	2009	2011	2012	2014	2016
Lead	-	-	-	29	-	-	-
Bouldering	5	1	3	1	3	-	5
Speed	-	-	-	42	-	-	-

=== Climbing European Championships ===
	2004	2008	2010	2013	2015
Bouldering	2	2	1	1	2

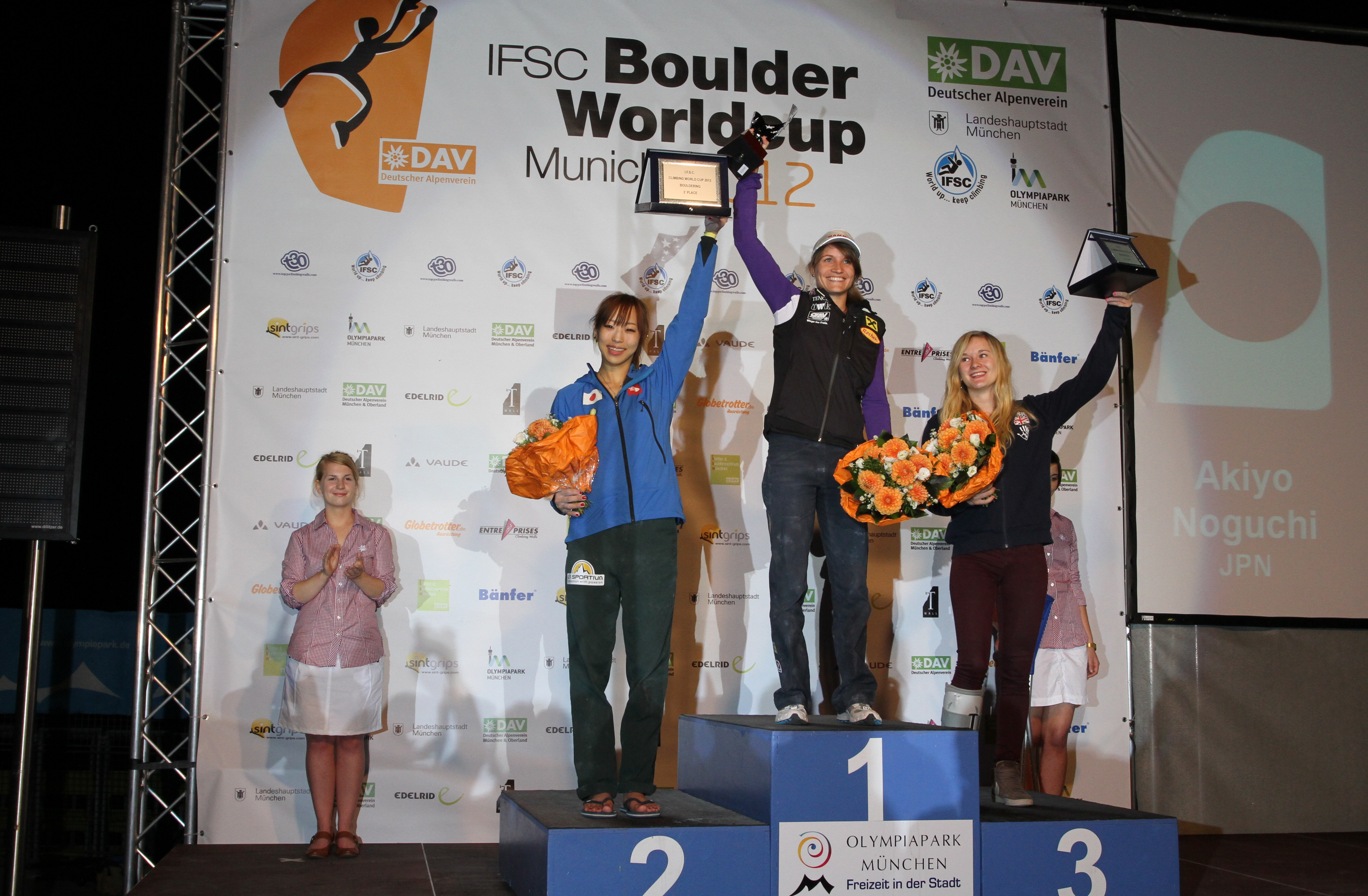
Anna Stöhr on the podium while raising her third Bouldering World Cup

== Number of medals in the Climbing World Cup ==
=== Bouldering ===
Season	Gold	Silver	Bronze	Total
2005		1	1	2
2006	1	1	1	3
2007		1		1
2008	4		1	5
2009	1		2	3
2010	2	2		4
2011	3	3	1	7
2012	2	2	1	5
2013	7	1		8
2014	1	2	2	5
2015	1			1
2016			1	1
Total	22	13	10	45

== See also ==
- List of grade milestones in rock climbing
- History of rock climbing
- Rankings of most career IFSC gold medals
