= Kilian Fischhuber =

Austrian rock climber

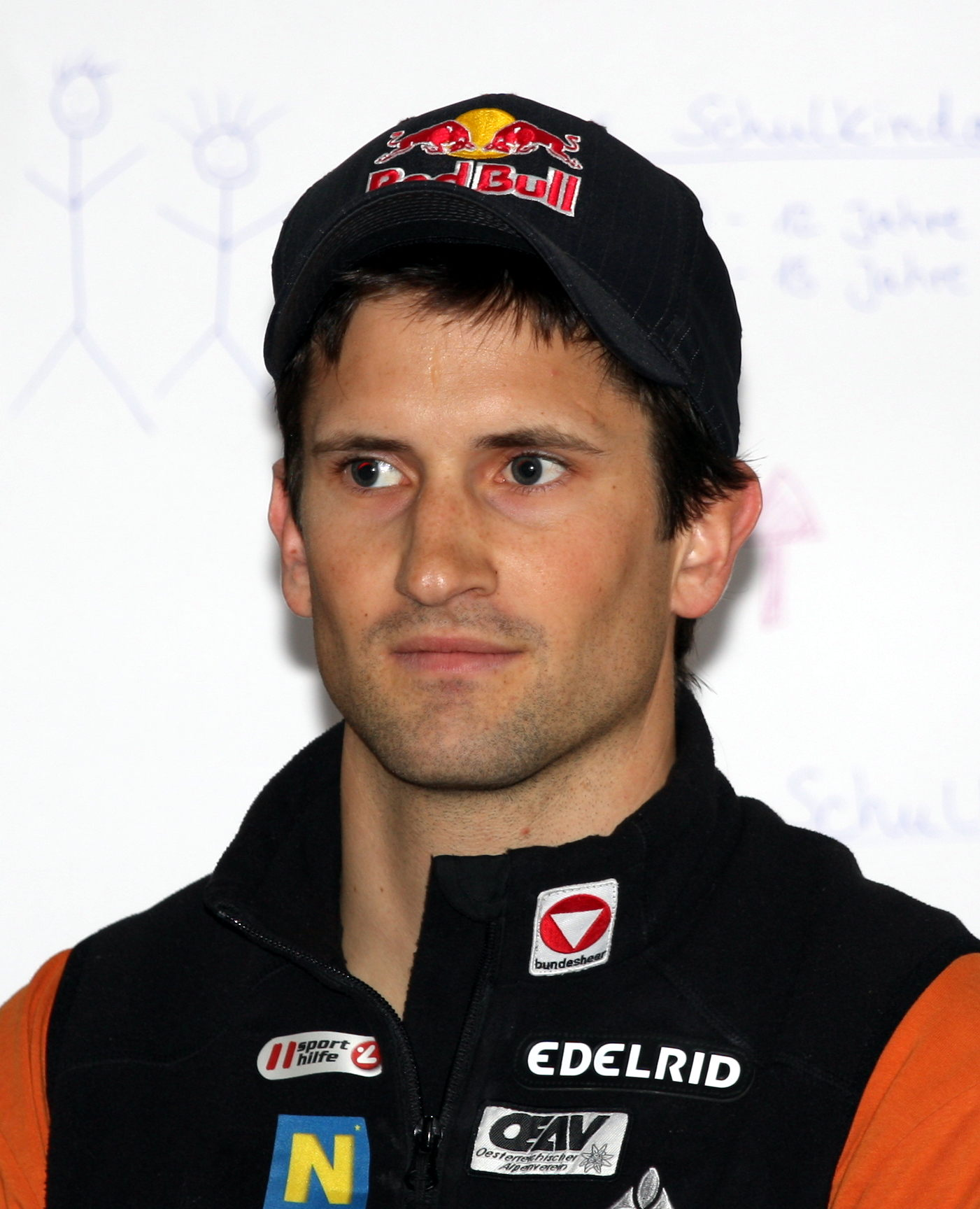

Personal information
- Nationality: Austrian
- Born: 1 August 1983 (age 43) Waidhofen an der Ybbs, Austria
- Occupation: Professional rock climber
- Height: 174 cm (5 ft 9 in)
- Weight: 63 kg (139 lb)
- Website: kilian-fischhuber.at

Climbing career
- Type of climber: Bouldering; Sport climbing; Competition climbing
- Highest grade: Redpoint: 9a (5.14d); Bouldering: 8C (V15)
- Known for: Winning the World Cup 5 times
Medal record
Men's sport climbing
Representing Austria
World Championships
Silver medal – second place	2005 Munich	Bouldering
Silver medal – second place	2012 Paris	Bouldering
World Cup
Second place	2004	Bouldering
Winner	2004	Combined
Winner	2005	Bouldering
Second place	2005	Combined
Second place	2006	Bouldering
Third place	2006	Combined
Winner	2007	Bouldering
Third place	2007	Combined
Winner	2008	Bouldering
Winner	2009	Bouldering
Second place	2010	Bouldering
Winner	2011	Bouldering
Second place	2012	Bouldering
European Championships
Silver medal – second place	2008	Bouldering
Bronze medal – third place	2010	Bouldering
Gold medal – first place	2013	Bouldering
- Updated on October 31, 2017

Kilian Fischhuber (born 1 August 1983) is a professional Austrian rock climber who specializes in bouldering, sport climbing and competition climbing, where competes in bouldering and lead climbing. From 2005 to 2011, he won five Bouldering World Cups. No other male climber was ever able to win it more than three times. Due to his outstanding career, he was awarded the La Sportiva Competition Award in 2009, together with Chris Sharma.

== Climbing career ==
=== Competition climbing ===
Fischhuber discovered indoor sport climbing in 1995.

From 1997 to 1999 he participated in Lead climbing international youth competitions.

In 1999, when he was 16 years old, he entered the Austrian bouldering team and started competing in the Bouldering World Cup, winning his first bronze medal in 2003 and his first gold in 2004.

He won the Bouldering World Cup five times, in 2005, 2007, 2008, 2009, and 2011. No other climber was ever able to win it more than three times, and no other climber was able to win it three times in a row (Jérôme Meyer won it in 2001, 2003, 2006).

At the end of 2014 he announced his retirement from competitions.

=== Rock climbing ===
Fischhuber has redpointed outdoor sport climbing routes up to grade 9a (5.14d), including making the ninth redpoint of Action Directe.

== Rankings ==
=== Climbing World Cup ===
	1999	2000	2001	2002	2003	2004	2005	2006	2007	2008	2009	2010	2011	2012	2013	2014
Lead			37	27	27	20	22	23	17							
Bouldering	49	18	11	8	8	2	1	2	1	1	1	2	1	2	5	5
Combined			3	3	5	1	2	3	3	-	-	-	-	-	-	-

=== Climbing World Championships ===
	2001	2003	2005	2007	2009	2011	2012	2014
Lead	26	50						
Bouldering	10	5	2	11	5	4	2	11

=== Climbing European Championships ===
	2002	2004	2007	2008	2010	2013
Lead	19	-	-	-	-	-
Bouldering	-	13	23	2	3	1

== Number of medals in the Climbing World Cup ==
=== Bouldering ===
Season	Gold	Silver	Bronze	Total
2003			1	1
2004	2	1		3
2005		1	2	3
2006	2	2	2	6
2007	2	2	1	5
2008	2	4		6
2009	2		2	4
2010	2		3	5
2011	4		1	5
2012	2	1	1	4
2013	2		1	3
2014	1		1	2
Total	21	11	15	47

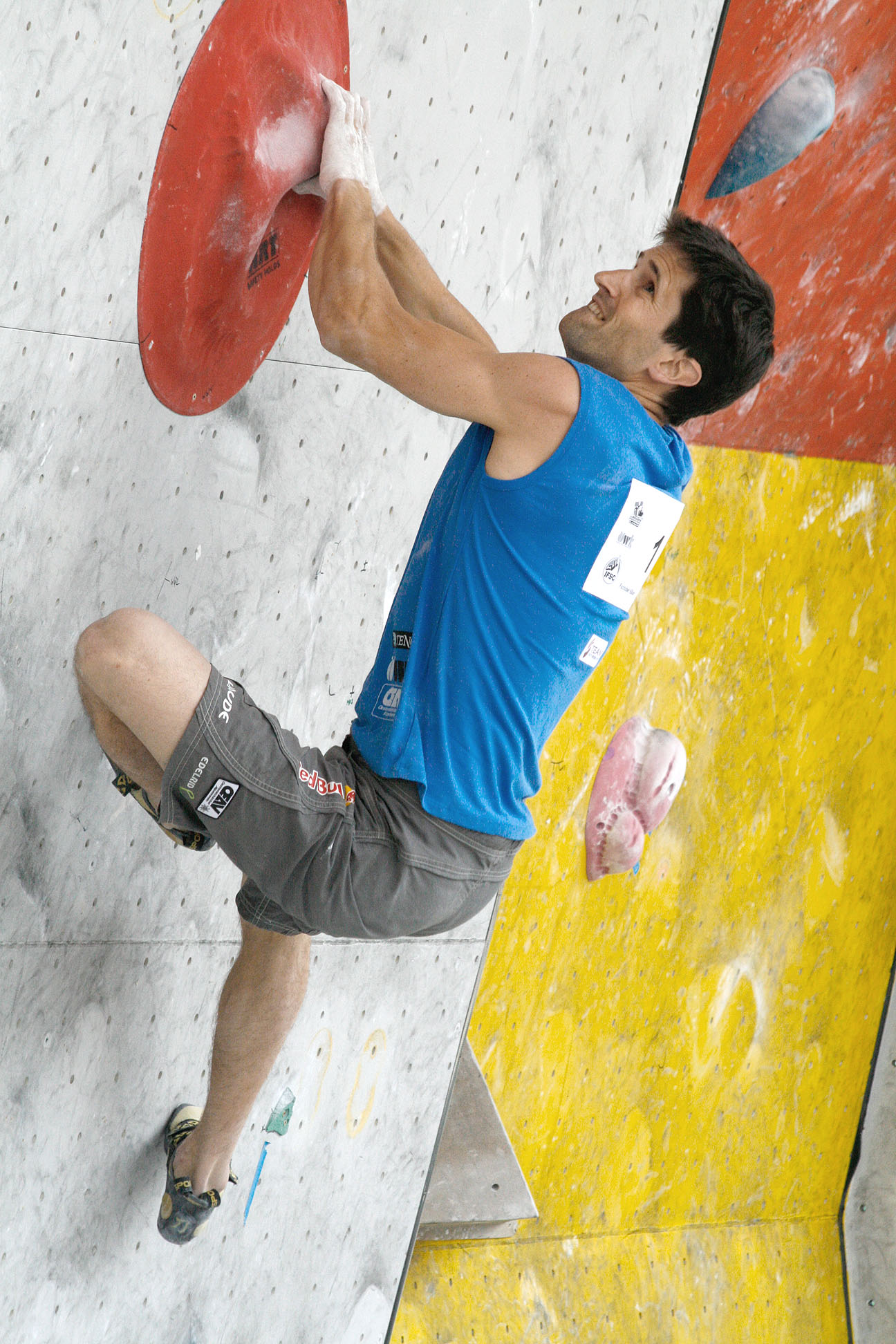
Kilian in Vienna in 2010, climbing the second problem of the Bouldering World Cup.

== Rock climbing ==
=== Boulder problems ===
Fischhuber climbed boulder problems graded up to 8C (V15).

=== Single-pitch routes ===
9a (5.14d):

- Action directe - Frankenjura (DEU) - 26 September 2006 - Ninth ascent
- Underground - Massone (Arco, ITA) - 2005 - First ascent by Manfred Stuffer, 1998

8c+ (5.14c):

- Bumaye - Margalef (ESP) - 2010
- Dolby Surround - Zillertal (AUT) - 2008
- Sanjski Par Extension - Misja Pec (SVN) - 2006
- Alien Carnage - Castillon, Alpes-Maritimes (FRA) - 2006
- Bah Bah Black Sheep - Céüse (FRA) - 2005
- Za stara kolo... - Misja Pec (SVN) - 2004
- Biographie - Céüse (FRA) - 2003

=== Multi-pitch routes ===
- Des Kaisers neue Kleider - Wilder Kaiser (AUT) - 28 September 2009 - First ascent by Stefan Glowacz, 1994

== See also ==
- List of grade milestones in rock climbing
- History of rock climbing
- Rankings of most career IFSC gold medals
