= Patxi Usobiaga =

Spanish rock climber (born 1980)

Patxi Usobiaga Lakunza
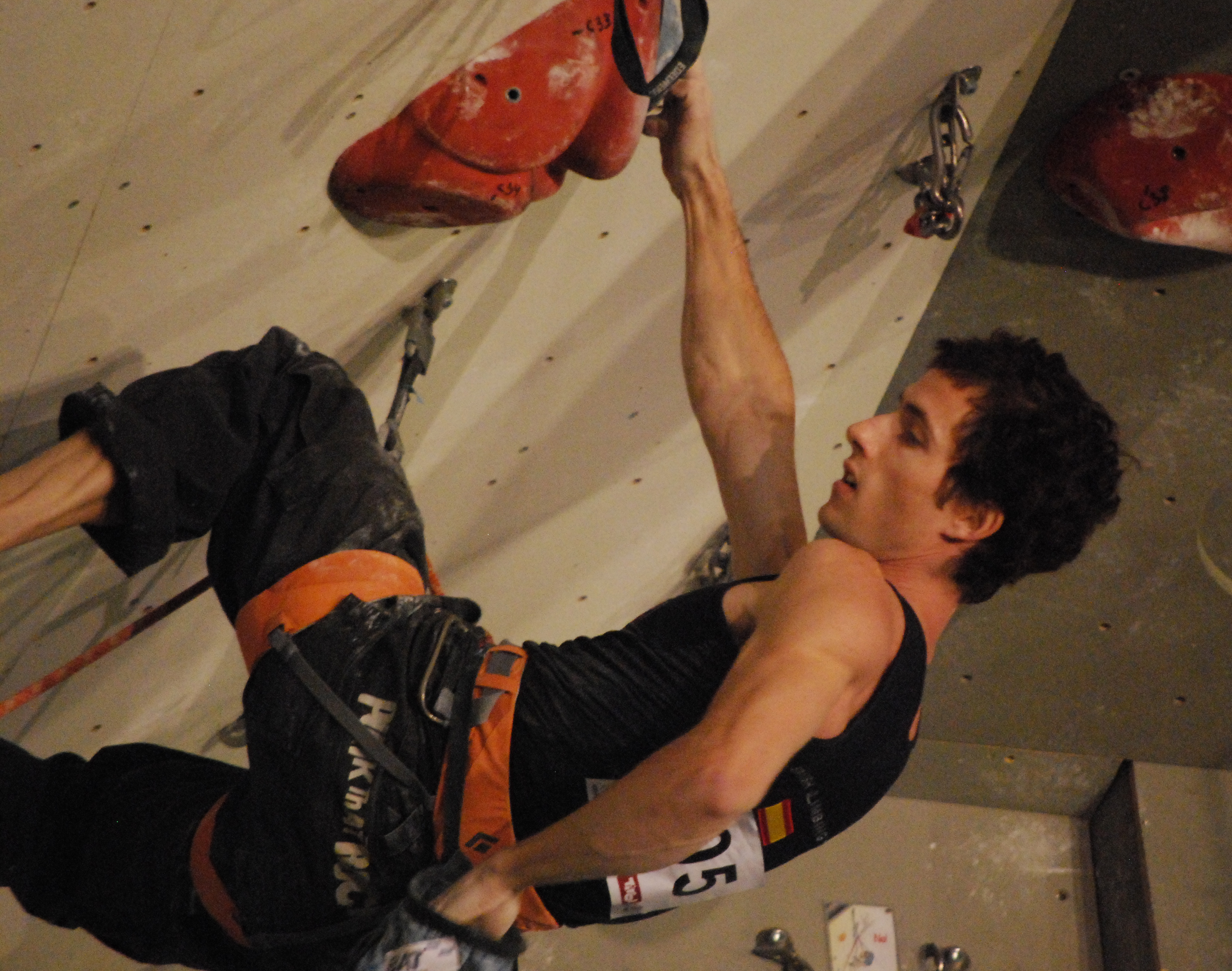
- Usobiaga in 2009

Personal information
- Born: September 7, 1980 (age 45) Eibar, Spain
- Occupation: Professional rock climber
- Height: 174 cm (5 ft 9 in)
- Weight: 62 kg (137 lb)
- Website: www.patxiusobiaga.com

Climbing career
- Type of climber: Competition climbing; Sport climbing; Bouldering
- Highest grade: Redpoint: 9a+ (5.15a); Onsight/Flash: 8c+ (5.14c)
- Known for: Winning 2 World Cups; First-ever to onsight at 8c+ (5.14c)
Medal record
Men's competition climbing
Representing Spain
World Cup
| Winner | 2006 | Lead |
| Winner | 2007 | Lead |
| Silver medal – second place | 2009 | Lead |
World Championships
| Silver medal – second place | 2003 | Lead |
| Silver medal – second place | 2005 | Lead |
| Silver medal – second place | 2007 | Lead |
| Gold medal – first place | 2009 | Lead |
European Championships
| Gold medal – first place | 2008 | Lead |
- Updated on October 31, 2017

Patxi Usobiaga Lakunza (born September 7, 1980), best known as Patxi Usobiaga, is a Basque Spanish professional rock climber, competition climber, sports climber and boulderer. He is known for winning two overall Lead Climbing World Cups in a row, and for being the first-ever climber in history to onsight an 8c+ (5.14c) route.

== Biography ==
Usobiaga started climbing in Atxarte when he was 10 years old. For four years he was belayed by his father. When he was 15, he climbed his first 8a (5.13b) graded route, ConanDax Librarian, in Araotz. When he was 18 he redpointed his first 8b (5.13d) graded route, Parva Naturalia, in Araotz.

From 1997 to 1999 he participated in youth competition climbing events. In 2000, he started competing at the Lead Climbing World Cup. In 2003 he earned his first gold medal in Edinburgh. When he was 26 he earned his first Lead climbing World Cup. Next year, he won his second one. Due to these outstanding achievements he was awarded the Salewa Rock Award in 2007.

In 2009 he won the Lead Climbing World Championships in Qinghai (CHN). At the end of 2009 he underwent a shoulder surgery and after three months of rehabilitative therapy he started training again.

In June 2010 a car accident caused a painful slipped disk. In 2011, he announced his retirement from competitions.

He climbed 267 routes graded between 8a and 9a+, 158 of which were onsighted. He was the first climber who onsighted a 8c+ route (Bizi Euskaraz, in Etxauri, 2007).

== Rankings ==
=== Climbing World Cup ===
| | 2002 | 2003 | 2004 | 2005 | 2006 | 2007 | 2008 | 2009 | 2010 |
|---|---|---|---|---|---|---|---|---|---|
| Lead | 67 | 4 | 5 | 6 | 1 | 1 | 4 | 2 | 4 |

=== Climbing World Championships ===
| | 1999 | 2001 | 2003 | 2005 | 2007 | 2009 |
|---|---|---|---|---|---|---|
| Lead | 61 | 49 | 2 | 2 | 2 | 1 |
| Bouldering | - | - | - | - | - | 21 |

=== Climbing European Championships ===
| | 2002 | 2004 | 2006 | 2008 | 2010 |
|---|---|---|---|---|---|
| Lead | 20 | 9 | 38 | 1 | 6 |

== Number of medals in the Climbing World Cup ==
=== Lead ===
| Season | Gold | Silver | Bronze | Total |
|---|---|---|---|---|
| 2003 | 1 | 1 | | 2 |
| 2004 | | | 2 | 2 |
| 2005 | | 1 | 1 | 2 |
| 2006 | 1 | 4 | 1 | 6 |
| 2007 | 1 | 3 | 1 | 5 |
| 2008 | 1 | | 1 | 2 |
| 2009 | 1 | 3 | | 4 |
| 2010 | 1 | 1 | | 2 |
| Total | 6 | 13 | 6 | 25 |

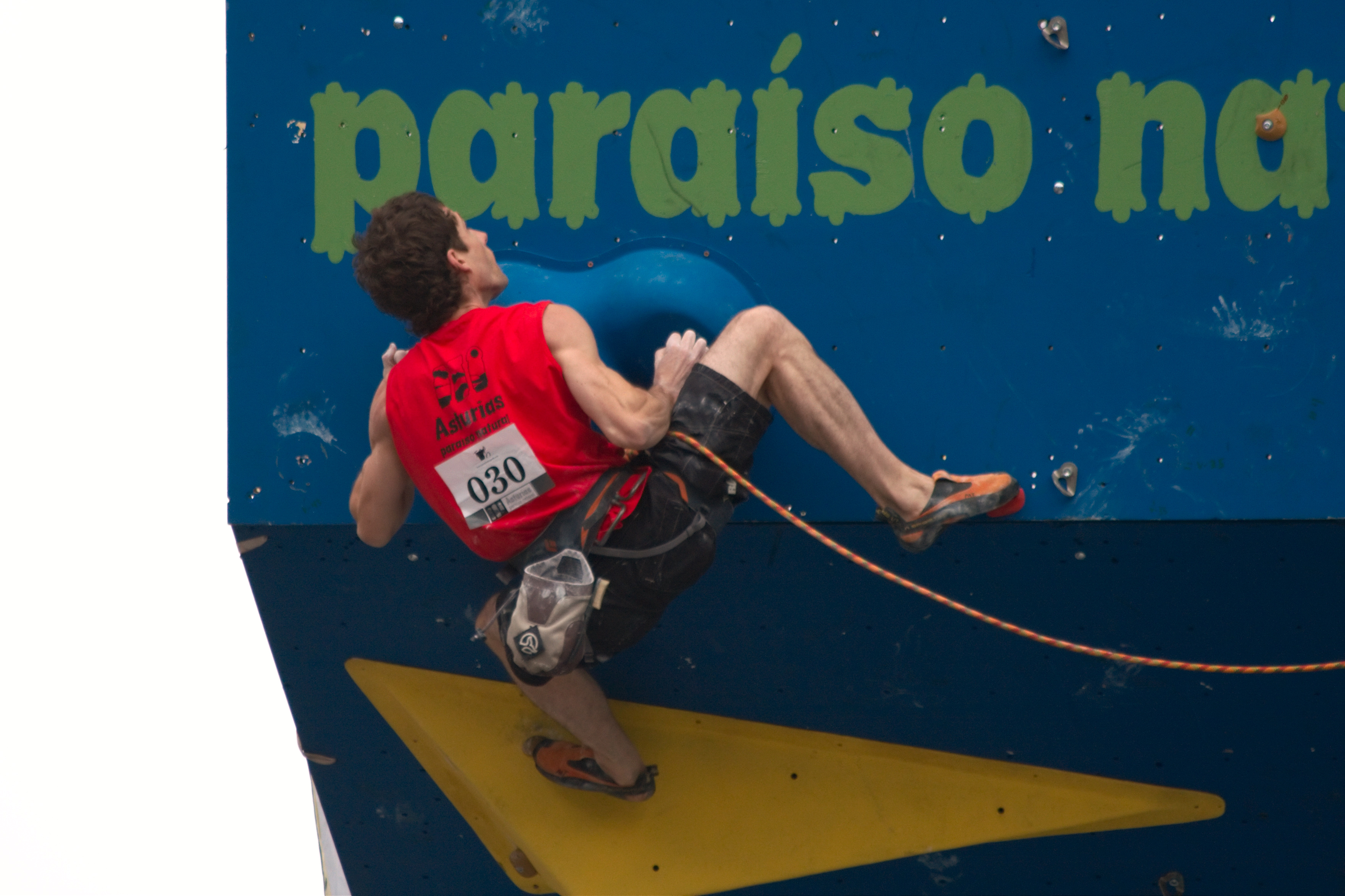
Usobiaga competing at the Spanish Lead Climbing Championship, 2010

== Rock climbing ==
Number of ascended routes:

- 4 9a+ (5.15a)
- 14 9a (5.14d)
- 31 8c+ (5.14c) (1 of which onsighted)
- 42 8c (5.14b) (7 of which onsighted)
- 87 8b (5.13d) and 8b+ (68 of which onsighted)

=== Redpointed routes ===
9a+ (5.15a):

- Pachamama – Oliana (ESP) – November 10, 2017
- La novena enmienda – Santa Linya (ESP) – December 3, 2007
- La Rambla – Siurana (ESP) – November 22, 2007 – Fifth ascent
- Realization – Céüse (FRA) – July 29, 2004 – Third ascent

9a (5.14d):

- PuntX – Gorges du Loup (FRA) – September 10, 2010
- Hades – Nassereith (AUT) – August 23, 2009 – Redpointed on second attempt. First ascent by Andreas Bindhammer, 2008
- Action directe – Frankenjura (DEU) – October 24, 2008 – Eleventh ascent
- Nice to eat you – Pierrot beach (FRA) – July 22, 2008 – Second ascent. First ascent by Mike Fussilier
- Fabela Pa La Enmienda – Santa Linya (ESP) – March 22, 2008
- Mendeku – Egino (ESP) – December 16, 2007 – Second ascent. First ascent by Iker Pou
- Fuck The system – Santa Linya (ESP) – December 9, 2007 – First ascent
- Esclatamasters – Perles (ESP) – December 7, 2007 – Third ascent. First ascent by Ramón Julián Puigblanqué
- Faxismoaren txontxogiloak – Etxauri (ESP) – December 22, 2007 – First ascent
- Begi Puntuan – Etxauri (ESP) – December 1, 2006 – First ascent
- Kinematix – Gorges du Loup (FRA) – June 14, 2006
- Psikoterapia – Valdegobia (ESP) – July 8, 2004 – First ascent
- Iñi Ameriketan – Baltzola (ESP) – April 1, 2003
- Il Domani – Baltzola (ESP) – March 21, 2003 – First ascent

=== Onsighted routes ===
8c+ (5.14c):

- Bizi Euskaraz – Etxauri (ESP) – December 11, 2007 – First ascent and first-ever 8c+ onsight in history. Project by Ekaitz Maiz.

8c (5.14b):

- Absinth – Sparchen (AUT) – July 25, 2010
- Nuska – Baltzola (ESP) – August 1, 2008
- Home sweet home – Pierrot Beach (FRA) – July 20, 2008
- Omerta – Urnersee (CHE) – July 15, 2008
- Mosca cullonera – Montsant (ESP) – November 30, 2007
- Pata negra – Rodellar (Bierge, (ESP) – October 7, 2006
- Gaua – Lezain (ESP) – October 10, 2005

== See also ==
- List of grade milestones in rock climbing
- History of rock climbing
- Rankings of most career IFSC gold medals
