= Sport climbing at the 2009 World Games – Women's lead =

Sport climbing - Women's lead at the 2009 World Games
- Venue: Shoushan Junior High School, Kaohsiung, Taiwan
- Dates: 19 July 2009
- Competitors: 11 from 9 nations

Medalists
gold medal	(Slovenia) Maja Vidmar
silver medal	(South Korea) Kim Ja-in
bronze medal	(France) Caroline Ciavaldini

The women's lead competition in sport climbing at the 2009 World Games took place on 19 July at the Shoushan Junior High School in Kaohsiung, Taiwan.

== Competition format ==
A total of 11 athletes entered the competition. Best eight athletes from preliminary advances to the semifinal. Best six athletes from the semifinal advance to the final.

== Results ==
=== Preliminary round ===
Rank	Athlete	Nation	Result	Note
1	Mina Markovič	Slovenia	Top	Q
1	Kim Ja-in	South Korea	Top	Q
1	Maja Vidmar	Slovenia	Top	Q
1	Caroline Ciavaldini	France	Top	Q
1	Yuka Kobayashi	Japan	Top	Q
1	Johanna Ernst	Austria	Top	Q
7	Akiyo Noguchi	Japan	44–	Q
8	Francis Rodriguez	Venezuela	23–	Q
9	Lee Hung-ying	Chinese Taipei	22	
9	Tiffany Hensley	United States	22	
9	Carlie Lebreton	Australia	22	

=== Semifinal ===
Rank	Athlete	Nation	Result	Note
1	Mina Markovič	Slovenia	Top	Q
1	Kim Ja-in	South Korea	Top	Q
1	Maja Vidmar	Slovenia	Top	Q
1	Caroline Ciavaldini	France	Top	Q
1	Yuka Kobayashi	Japan	Top	Q
1	Johanna Ernst	Austria	Top	Q
1	Akiyo Noguchi	Japan	Top	
8	Francis Rodriguez	Venezuela	22	

=== Final ===
Rank	Athlete	Nation	Result
1st place, gold medalist(s)	Maja Vidmar	Slovenia	44
2nd place, silver medalist(s)	Kim Ja-in	South Korea	37–
3rd place, bronze medalist(s)	Caroline Ciavaldini	France	27.2–
4	Yuka Kobayashi	Japan	27.1–
5	Johanna Ernst	Austria	26.2–
6	Mina Markovič	Slovenia	26.1–
