= Bouldering at the 2019 IFSC Climbing World Cup =

- Location: Meiringen, Switzerland Moscow, Russia; Chongqing, China; Wujiang, China; Munich, Germany Vail, United States
- Dates: 5 April – 8 June 2019

Champions
- Men: (Japan) Tomoa Narasaki
- Women: (Slovenia) Janja Garnbret

The 2019 season of the IFSC Climbing World Cup was the 21st season of the competition. Bouldering competitions were held at six stops of the IFSC Climbing World Cup. The bouldering season began on April 5 at the World Cup in Meiringen, and concluded on June 8 with the World Cup in Vail. At each stop a qualifying was held on the first day of the competition, and the semi-final and final rounds were conducted on the second day of the competition. The winners were awarded trophies, and the best three finishers received medals. At the end of the season an overall ranking was determined based upon points, which athletes were awarded for finishing in the top 30 of each individual event.

Janja Garnbret won the women's seasonal title, winning all six competitions of the season in the process, an achievement which had never been accomplished before. The men's seasonal title went to Tomoa Narasaki while Japan defended its title in the national teams competition.

== Olympic qualification ==
For the Tokyo 2020 Olympics athletes can qualify through either the IFSC Combined World Championships, the Olympic Qualifying Event or the Continental Championships. The Olympic Qualifying Event is an invitation only event open to the 20 highest ranked climbers on the World Cup circuit who haven't already qualified.

== Overall ranking ==
The overall ranking is determined based upon points, which athletes are awarded for finishing in the top 30 of each individual event. There are six competitions in the season, but only the best five attempts are counted. The national ranking is the sum of the points of that country's three best male and female athletes. Results displayed (in brackets) are not counted.

=== Men ===
The results of the twenty most successful athletes of the Bouldering World Cup 2019:

Rank	Name	Points	Meiringen	Moscow	Chongqing	Wujiang	Munich	Vail
1	(Japan) Tomoa Narasaki	340	2. 80	( — )	2. 80	1. 100	( — )	2. 80
2	(Czech Republic) Adam Ondra	335	1. 100	2. 80	( — )	14. 24	2. 80	5. 51
3	(Japan) Yoshiyuki Ogata	264	8. 40	3. 65	(29. 1)	9. 37	15. 22	1. 100
4	(South Korea) Jongwon Chon	228	5. 51	10. 34	(15. 22)	11. 31	6. 47	3. 65
5	(Japan) Kokoro Fujii	227	4. 55	9. 37	6. 47	5. 51	( — )	9. 37
6	(Germany) Jan Hojer	223	(21. 9 *)	12. 28	12. 28	6. 47	3. 65	4. 55
7	(Russia) Alexey Rubtsov	214	7. 43	11. 31	5. 51	10. 34	4. 55	( — )
8	(Slovenia) Anže Peharc	205	15. 22	4. 55	3. 65	20. 12	5. 51	( — )
9	(Slovenia) Jernej Kruder	191	11. 31	1. 100	(34. 0)	16. 20	11. 31	21. 9
10	(Austria) Jakob Schubert	184	47. 0	27. 3	18. 16	3. 65	1. 100	( — )
11	(Japan) Rei Sugimoto	174	3. 65	16. 20	7. 43	7. 43	( — )	27. 3
12	(Japan) Kai Harada	148	21. 9	( — )	11. 31	2. 80	( — )	12. 28
13	(France) Manuel Cornu	143	( — )	7. 43	1. 100	( — )	( — )	( — )
14	(Japan) Taisei Ishimatsu	136	9. 37	17. 18	13. 26	( 23. 7 )	20. 12	7. 43
15	(Slovenia) Gregor Vezonik	121	20. 12	23. 7	8. 40	15. 22	8. 40	( — )
16	(Japan) Tomoaki Takata	117	6. 47	19. 14	21. 9 *	( — )	18. 16	11. 31
17	(China) YuFei Pan	112	13. 26	21. 9	21. 9 *	8. 40	12. 28	( — )
18	(Japan) Keita Dohi	109	10. 34	( — )	( — )	4. 55	( — )	16. 20
18	(Germany) Alexander Megos	109	16. 20	15. 22	23. 7	( — )	10. 34	13. 26
20	(United States) Nathaniel Coleman	104	17. 18	( — )	17. 18	12. 28	( — )	8. 40

=== Women ===
The results of the twenty most successful athletes of the Bouldering World Cup 2019:

Rank	Name	Points	Meiringen	Moscow	Chongqing	Wujiang	Munich	Vail
1	(Slovenia) Janja Garnbret	500	1. 100	1. 100	1. 100	1. 100	1. 100	(1. 100)
2	(Japan) Akiyo Noguchi	320	2. 80	( — )	2. 80	2. 80	( — )	2. 80
3	(France) Fanny Gibert	308	4. 55	3. 65	7. 43	(13. 25) *	2. 80	3. 65
4	(Japan) Futaba Ito	206	9. 37	6. 47	5. 51	7. 43	( — )	12. 28
5	(Austria) Jessica Pilz	203	21. 9 *	5. 51	3. 65	5. 51	12. 27 *	( — )
6	(Switzerland) Petra Klingler	180	5. 51	8. 40	4. 55	10. 34	( — )	( — )
7	(Slovenia) Lučka Rakovec	163	16. 20	4. 55	12. 28	15. 22	8. 38 *	( — )
8	(Slovenia) Katja Kadic	161	12. 28	19. 14	6. 47	13. 25 *	6. 47	( — )
9	(France) Julia Chanourdie	157	17. 17 *	( 31. 0 )	14. 24	6. 47	4. 55	19. 14
10	(United Kingdom) Shauna Coxsey	145	3. 65	2. 80	( — )	( — )	( — )	( — )
10	(Ukraine) Ievgeniia Kazbekova	145	13. 26	10. 32 *	25. 5 *	11. 31	5. 51	( — )
12	(Canada) Alannah Yip	139	15. 22	9. 37	8. 40	17. 18	( — )	15. 22
13	(United States) Alex Johnson	125	7. 43	25. 5	17. 17 *	(29. 1)	10. 34	13. 26
14	(Germany) Afra Hönig	111	10. 34	14. 23	( — )	25. 5	17. 15 *	10. 34
15	(Japan) Miho Nonaka	110	( — )	( — )	( — )	4. 55	( — )	4. 55
16	(Japan) Mao Nakamura	102	( — )	23. 7	16. 20	12. 28	( — )	6. 47
17	(South Korea) Sol Sa	100	17. 17 *	7. 43	( — )	8. 40	( — )	( — )
18	(United States) Kyra Condie	93	8. 40	16. 20	( — )	( — )	21. 9	14. 24
19	(China) YueTong Zhang	80	27. 3	13. 26	11. 31	16. 20	( — )	( — )
20	(Japan) Ai Mori	77	27. 3	( — )	21. 9	3. 65	( — )	( — )

* = Joint place with another athlete

=== National Teams ===
The results of the ten most successful countries of the Bouldering World Cup 2019:

Country names as used by the IFSC

Rank	Name	Points	Meiringen	Moscow	Chongqing	Wujiang	Munich	Vail
1	Japan	1693	322	210	321	435	(86)	405
2	Slovenia	1359	213	331	280	201	334	(109)
3	France	766	(75)	151	205	104	149	157
4	Austria	591	75	99	84	137	196	(15)
5	Germany	534	63	80	74	(61)	131	186
6	United States of America	468	102	49	89	(38)	48	180
7	(Russia) Russian Federation	396	43	136	55	79	83	(—)
8	(South Korea) Republic of Korea	353	68	77	(34)	78	47	83
9	Czech Republic	336	100	81	(0)	24	80	51
10	(United Kingdom) Great Britain	330	101	119	34	9	67	(6)

== Meiringen, Switzerland (5–6 April) ==
=== Women ===
100 athletes attended the World Cup in Meiringen. Last year's winner and overall Bouldering World Cup winner Miho Nonaka had to sit out due to injury. Janja Garnbret (3T4z 6 6) won in front of Akiyo Noguchi (3T4z 9 12) as the only two athletes to top the final boulder. The 2016 and 2017 winner Shauna Coxsey came in third, after recovering from last years injuries.

Rank	Name	Score
1	(Slovenia) Janja Garnbret	3T4z 6 6
2	(Japan) Akiyo Noguchi	3T4z 9 12
3	(United Kingdom) Shauna Coxsey	2T3z 3 4
4	(France) Fanny Gibert	1T2z 4 2
5	(Switzerland) Petra Klingler	1T1z 1 1
6	(Australia) Oceania Mackenzie	1T1z 2 2

=== Men ===
115 athletes attended the World Cup in Meiringen. Last year's winner and overall Bouldering World Cup winner Jernej Kruder did not advance past the semi-final. Adam Ondra (4T4z 10 9) attended his first Bouldering World Cup since 2015 and won the competition, being the only athlete to top all routes in the final (and the previous rounds). The final route featured a handjam move which shut down most competitors. Jongwon Chon managed to dyno past it to the zone, but only Ondra, with recent trad experience, was able to use the hold as designed. The Japanese team finished with seven athletes in the Top 10 including Tomoa Narasaki (3T4z 3 4) and Rei Sugimoto (2T3z 6 7), who rounded out the podium.

Rank	Name	Score
1	(Czech Republic) Adam Ondra	4T4z 10 9
2	(Japan) Tomoa Narasaki	3T3z 7 6
3	(Japan) Rei Sugimoto	2T3z 6 7
4	(Japan) Kokoro Fujii	1T3z 3 5
5	(South Korea) Jongwon Chon	1T3z 3 8
6	(Japan) Tomoaki Takata	1T1z 1 1

== Moscow, Russia (13–14 April) ==
=== Women ===
92 athletes attended the World Cup in Moscow. Most of the Japanese team including Akiyo Noguchi and Miho Nonaka chose to not attend the World Cup. The semi-final round consisted of a tough set of boulders that saw very few tops. In contrast the final round problems were criticised for being a bit too easy, with every athlete topping at least three of the four boulders. Janja Garnbret (4T4z 4 4) won the competition, flashing each of the final boulders. Shauna Coxsey (4T4z 6 6) came in second by virtue of having had a better semi-final than Fanny Gibert (4T4z 6 6) who had an identical score in the final.

Rank	Name	Score
1	(Slovenia) Janja Garnbret	4T4z 4 4
2	(United Kingdom) Shauna Coxsey	4T4z 6 6
3	(France) Fanny Gibert	4T4z 6 6
4	(Slovenia) Lučka Rakovec	3T4z 3 5
5	(Austria) Jessica Pilz	3T4z 9 10
6	(Japan) Futaba Ito	3T3z 6 6

=== Men ===
110 athletes attended the World Cup in Moscow. Meiringen winner Adam Ondra just barely made it through the qualifying but dominated the semi-final, topping all four boulders whereas no other athlete topped more than two. In the final Adam Ondra (3T4z 5 7), Jernej Kruder (4T4z 8 6) and Yoshiyuki Ogata (3T3z 6 5) topped the first three boulders. Kruder was the only athlete to make it to the top of the final boulder, though, thus winning the competition.

Rank	Name	Score
1	(Slovenia) Jernej Kruder	4T4z 8 6
2	(Czech Republic) Adam Ondra	3T4z 5 7
3	(Japan) Yoshiyuki Ogata	3T3z 6 5
4	(Slovenia) Anže Peharc	2T3z 6 6
5	(Japan) Rei Kawamata	1T3z 2 6
6	(Russia) Vadim Timonov	1T3z 2 8

== Chongqing, China (27–28 April) ==
=== Women ===
85 athletes attended the World Cup in Chongqing. Shauna Coxsey, who had won medals at both previous World Cups this season, chose to not attend the World Cup. Janja Garnbret (4T4z 8 6) won her third straight World Cup. Akiyo Noguchi (4T4z 12 9) won Silver and Jessica Pilz (3T4z 8 11) took the Bronze medal.

Rank	Name	Score
1	(Slovenia) Janja Garnbret	4T4z 8 6
2	(Japan) Akiyo Noguchi	4T4z 12 9
3	(Austria) Jessica Pilz	3T4z 8 11
4	(Switzerland) Petra Klingler	1T3z 2 8
5	(Japan) Futaba Ito	1T2z 1 4
6	(Slovenia) Katja Kadic	0T4z 0 10

=== Men ===
101 athletes attended the World Cup in Chongqing. Meiringen winner Adam Ondra did not to attend due to respiratory infection and Moscow winner Jernej Kruder failed to advance past the qualifying round. In the final Manuel Cornu (3T4z 5 5) managed to win his first World Cup. Tomoa Narasaki (3T4z 5 6) came in second and Anže Peharc (3T4z 10 10) finished in third place.

Rank	Name	Score
1	(France) Manuel Cornu	3T4z 5 5
2	(Japan) Tomoa Narasaki	3T4z 5 6
3	(Slovenia) Anže Peharc	3T4z 10 10
4	(Switzerland) Sascha Lehmann	2T4z 3 10
5	(Russia) Alexey Rubtsov	2T4z 4 11
6	(Japan) Kokoro Fujii	2T4z 7 9

== Wujiang, China (4–5 May) ==
=== Women ===
83 athletes attended the World Cup in Wujiang. 2018 overall Bouldering World Cup winner Miho Nonaka attended her first World Cup of the season, returning from a shoulder injury. Nonaka (2T4z 4 7) finished in fourth place. Janja Garnbret (4T4z 5 4) won her fourth straight World Cup while Akiyo Noguchi (3T4z 4 5) won Silver and 15-year old Ai Mori (3T4z 11 9) took the Bronze medal in her first World Cup final appearance.

Rank	Name	Score
1	(Slovenia) Janja Garnbret	4T4z 8 6
2	(Japan) Akiyo Noguchi	4T4z 12 9
3	(Japan) Ai Mori	3T4z 11 9
4	(Japan) Miho Nonaka	2T4z 4 7
5	(Austria) Jessica Pilz	2T4z 6 7
6	(France) Julia Chanourdie	0T2z 0 2

=== Men ===
97 athletes attended the World Cup in Wujiang. None of the previous World Cup winners of the season managed to advance to the final round. Chongqing runner-up Tomoa Narasaki (3T4z 7 8) won the competition in front of Kai Harada (3T4z 7 13). Jakob Schubert (1T4z 2 9) and Keita Dohi (1T4z 2 9) had identical final scores. Schubert was awarded the bronze medal by virtue of his better semi-final performance.

Rank	Name	Score
1	(Japan) Tomoa Narasaki	3T4z 7 8
2	(Japan) Kai Harada	3T4z 7 13
3	(Austria) Jakob Schubert	1T4z 2 9
4	(Japan) Keita Dohi	1T4z 2 9
5	(Japan) Kokoro Fujii	1T4z 3 18
6	(Germany) Jan Hojer	1T3z 9 11

== Munich, Germany (18–19 May) ==
=== Women ===
89 athletes attended the World Cup in Munich. Most climbers from the Japanese team, including stars such as Miho Nonaka and Akiyo Noguchi, were absent, opting to train for the combined instead. With Noguchi absent it was clear even before the competition was held, that the seasonal title would go to Janja Garnbret. Nonetheless Garnbret dominated the competition, topping all four semi-final boulders where of the other athletes only Ievgeniia Kazbekova could find a single top on a boulder. In the final Garnbret (4T4z 5 5) and Fanny Gibert (4T4z 8 6) topped all four boulders, but Garnbret won by number of attempts. Garnbret thus won her third consecutive title in Munich and the fifth consecutive title of the season, which will have her finish the season on the maximum points attainable (500) regardless of her result in Vail. The bronze medal went to Mia Krampl (3T3z 9 9) who climbed through the final despite a knee injury.

Rank	Name	Score
1	(Slovenia) Janja Garnbret	4T4z 5 5
2	(France) Fanny Gibert	4T4z 8 6
3	(Slovenia) Mia Krampl	3T4z 11 9
4	(France) Julia Chanourdie	2T2z 5 5
5	(Ukraine) Ievgeniia Kazbekova	1T3z 3 7
6	(Slovenia) Katja Kadic	1T2z 1 6

=== Men ===
119 athletes attended the World Cup in Munich. Most climbers from the Japanese team, including stars such as Tomoa Narasaki, Rei Sugimoto and Kai Harada, were absent, opting to train for the combined instead. In the final Adam Ondra flashed the first three boulders, leading the competition in front of Jakob Schubert on two tops and three zones. However, Ondra (3T3z 3 3) could not find a zone on the final boulder whereas Schubert (3T4z 7 8) had topped, thus winning the competition. German Jan Hojer won bronze, making his first podium since his win in Munich two years before.

Rank	Name	Score
1	(Austria) Jakob Schubert	3T4z 7 8
2	(Czech Republic) Adam Ondra	3T3z 3 3
3	(Germany) Jan Hojer	2T4z 4 14
4	(Russia) Alexey Rubtsov	2T3z 5 6
5	(Slovenia) Anze Peharc	1T4z 3 6
6	(South Korea) Jongwon Chon	1T3z 5 9

== Vail, United States (7–8 June) ==
=== Women ===
55 athletes attended the World Cup in Vail. Several strong athletes decided not to attend including Shauna Coxsey, Jessica Pilz, and all of the Slovenian team aside from Janja Garnbret. Garnbret had already secured the overall seasonal title, but could become the first climber ever to make a complete sweep of a bouldering season, winning all World Cups.

Janja reached the final and completed boulders one and two. Going into the third boulder Garnbret, Akiyo Noguchi and Miho Nonaka had each topped number one and two while Fanny Gibert, Mao Nakamura, and Luce Douady had all failed to top the second boulder. Garnbret had fallen behind on number of attempts, however. As Nonaka and Noguchi could not find a top on the third boulder Garnbret seized the chance to take the lead, which put her in a position where she was guaranteed the victory if she could find a top on the final problem. When Noguchi completed the final problem it was clear that Garnbret would indeed have to match the top for the win. Ultimately Janja (4T4z 9 8) flashed the final boulder and secured her sixth straight win, completing the first sweep of a Bouldering World Cup season. Noguchi (3T4z 5 6) came in second and Gibert (2T4z 3 9) finished third.

Rank	Name	Score
1	(Slovenia) Janja Garnbret	4T4z 9 8
2	(Japan) Akiyo Noguchi	3T4z 5 6
3	(France) Fanny Gibert	2T4z 3 9
4	(Japan) Miho Nonaka	2T4z 5 5
5	(France) Luce Douady	1T4z 2 8
6	(Japan) Mao Nakamura	1T4z 3 10

=== Men ===
57 athletes attended the World Cup in Vail. Adam Ondra went into the competition with a 21-point lead over Tomoa Narasaki in the World Cup standings, meaning that Ondra would win the seasonal title if he finished in first or second place regardless of Narasaki's finish.

Ondra and Narasaki both made it to the final of the Vail competition along with Yoshiyuki Ogata, Jongwon Chon, Jan Hojer, and Sean McColl. All athletes but McColl found tops on the first two boulders. Ondra did not make it to the zone on the third, though, whereas Narasaki and Ogata completed the problem. The final boulder was only topped by Yoshiyuki Ogata (4T4z 11 9) who won his first bouldering World Cup being the only athlete to top all final boulders. Tomoa Narasaki (3T4z 5 5) came in second while Adam Ondra (2T3z 3 4) finished fifth, which allowed Narasaki to overtake Ondra in the World Cup standings and claim the seasonal title. Jongwon Chon (3T4z 6 7) won the bronze medal, his first medal since his win in Navi Mumbai almost two years before.

Rank	Name	Score
1	(Japan) Yoshiyuki Ogata	4T4z 11 9
2	(Japan) Tomoa Narasaki	3T4z 5 5
3	(South Korea) Jongwon Chon	3T4z 6 7
4	(Germany) Jan Hojer	2T4z 4 6
5	(Czech Republic) Adam Ondra	2T3z 3 4
6	(Canada) Sean McColl	1T3z 3 9
