= Patrick Edlinger =

French rock climber (1960–2012)

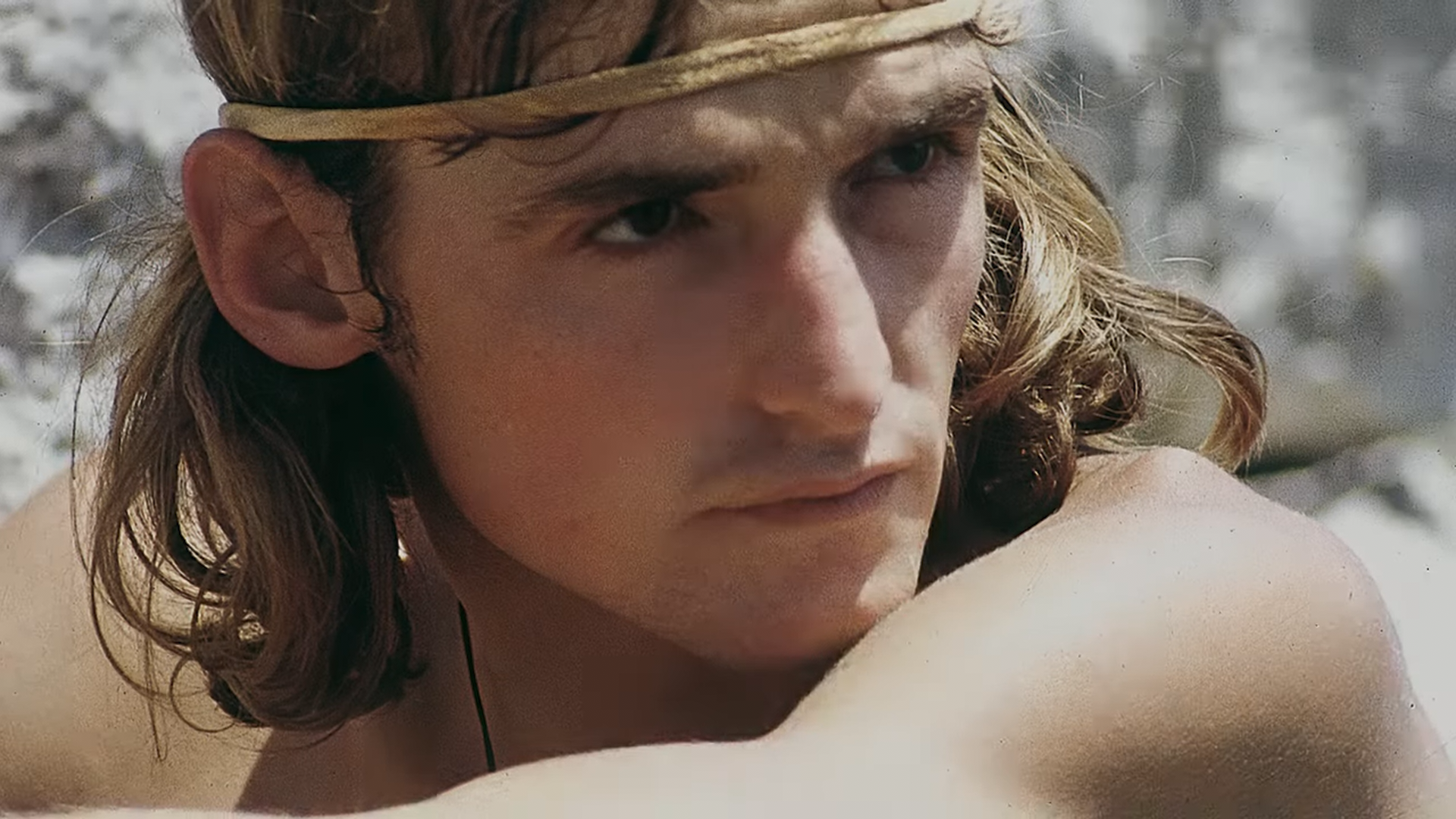

Personal information
- Nationality: French
- Born: 15 June 1960 Dax, Landes
- Died: 16 November 2012 (aged 52) La Palud-sur-Verdon

Climbing career
- Type of climber: Sport climbing; Free solo climbing; Bouldering
- Highest grade: Redpoint: 8c (5.14b); Onsight/Flash: 7c (5.12d); Free solo: 8a (5.13b)
- Known for: First-ever to onsight at grade 7c (5.12d), and second-ever 7b+ (5.12c); Second-ever to redpoint at grade 7c (5.12d) and 7c+ (5.13a); Second-ever to free solo at grade 8a (5.13b)
Medal record
Sport RocciaI Bardonnechia
Winner	1986	Lead
Snowbird International Sport Climbing Championship
Winner	1988	Lead
Rock Master
Winner	1988	Lead
Munich International Sport Climbing Championship
Winner	1989	Lead
- Updated on 18 september 2026

Patrick Edlinger (15 June 1960 – 16 November 2012) was a professional French rock climber, climbing author, and climbing film-maker. Edlinger is considered a pioneer of the rock-climbing disciplines of sport climbing, of competition climbing, and of free solo climbing, and was ranked amongst the world's greatest rock-climbers during the mid to late 1980s as the sport began to moderize from its traditional climbing roots and into sport-climbing and competition-climbing.

Edlinger was the second-ever climber to redpoint at grade 7c (5.12d) with Nymphodalle (1979), and the second-ever at grade 7c+ (5.13a) with Le Toit (1981). He was the first-ever climber to onsight at grade 7b+ (5.12c) with Captain crochet (1982), and second-ever at grade 7c (5.12d) with La Polka des Ringards (1982). His free solo in 1989 of Orange Mécanique was the second-ever at the grade of 8a (5.13b) in history. Nicknamed "Le Blond" (after his hair), he became known for his distinctive climbing style and physical appearance within the rock climbing community.

== Early life and education ==
Edlinger was born on 15 June, 1960 in Dax, Landes. His father, Jean-Marie, was a French Air Force pilot who flew reconnaissance. Partick's mother, Éliane, was from the town of Barcelonnette in Haute Provence. His strong-minded maternal grandfather, Louis Bottero, was considered an influence on the young Edlinger. Obsessed with climbing as a teenager, one of his boyhood heros was the American climber Gary Hemming, and he would quote Rene Desmaison's view on Hemming, that "He ignored all boundaries and laws, loved life passionately without constraints of any kind". His parents made a deal that if he graduated from school, which he did in 1976, they would support him to become a full time mountain guide or ski instructor.

== Climbing career ==
After graduating from school, Edlinger devoted himself to rock climbing, frequenting major French rock climbing areas such as Buoux, the Verdon Gorge and the Calanques. He was introduced to Patrick Berhault, and they would become close friends and described as "brothers". Their climbing partnership was competitive and they applied themselves to raising their standards of training, conditioning and technical ability. They made several impressive winter ascents of major alpine climbing routes, including SuperCouloir (ED1, M6) on Mont Blanc du Tacul in 1980. French climbing writer Jean-Mi Asselin wrote, "You know, Patrick Edlinger didn't like the cold", and "He said [to Berhault] it's not for me. Later, when they climbed together again, he told Patrick Berhault, on rock I'm OK, but the snow and ice, I don’t do. It was clear between them".

Now nicknamed "the Blond", from his hair, Edlinger focused on helping to pioneer the new discipline of sport climbing, where pre-bolted climbing protection was used to enable the rock climbers ascend ever-blanker face climbing routes that traditional climbers could not. In 1981, he freed Le Toit, the second-ever 7c (5.12d) graded route in history. In 1982, he onsighted Captain Crochet and La Polka des Ringards at Buoux, the first-ever onsights at 7b+ (5.12c) and 7c (5.12d) respectively.

In 1982, Edlinger came to wider public and international attention with Jean‑Paul Janssen's film La Vie au Bout des Doigts (Life By Fingertips), showing him free solo climbing in Buoux, with an inconic image of Edlinger hanging one-handed from the overhang on the crux of the multi-pitch route, La Beda 6a+ (5.10b). The film was a major commercial success, and brought Edlinger lucrative sponsorship deals, and Climbing described it's effect on the sport as "like a bomb going off; nothing was ever the same".

His fluid climbing style and personal physical appearance made him a recognisable figure in the climbing world. In 1983, he made the first free ascent of Ça Glisse Au Pays des Merveilles at Buoux, one of the first 8a (5.13b) graded sport climbs in France. In 1984, Edlinger was the subject of the short climbing film, Opera Vertical, which concludes with a solo ascent in the Verdon Gorge.

In the summer of 1985, Edlinger — accompanied by Jean-François "Poil" Lignan and photographer Gérard Kosicki — embarked on a road trip across the United States. Starting in Colorado in late July, Edlinger sent Grand Inquisitor at Bell Buttress and completed the crack climb of Sphinx Rock 8a (5.13b) in six attempts. The journey continued to Lake Tahoe, California, where he ascented the famous Grand Illusion, the world's first ever 8a (5.13b) route. In the Joshua Tree desert, he climbed Asteroid Crack and Five Crying Cowboys before, among others, conquering the basalt columns of El Matador at Devils Tower, Wyoming, along with many other major routes of the era. His cross-country trip concluded in September on the overhangs of the Shawangunks, near New York. The story of this journey is told through images in the book Rock Games (1985) by photographer Gérard Kosicki.

Edlinger won some of the first competition climbing events in history, including Sportroccia (1986), Rock Master and Snowbird (1988), the first ever competition climbing event to be held in the US, at the 1988 International Sport Climbing Championships in Snowbird, Utah. In 1988, at the Rock Master competition in Arco, Italia—held for the first time on an artificial wall—Patrick Edlinger and Stefan Glowacz tied for first place. The event marked climbing's transition into its modern, media-focused form. In 1989, he won the World Championships in Munich. The final featured a "side-by-side" showdown between German climber Wolfgang Güllich and Patrick Edlinger.

In 1989, atrick Edlinger completed a free solo ascent of Orange Mécanique 5.13b (8a), which was the second-ever time a climber has free-soloed at that grade in history. at Cimaï (South of France), an extraordinary feat for the time at that level of difficulty.

On 21 July 1995, while training in the Calanques near Marseille on a route graded 7b (5.12b), he skipped several pieces of protection to save time; a hold broke and he fell about 18 metres. He survived with muscle tears and a cardiac arrest, but the accident marked the end of his top‑level career and of his extreme free solos. Afterwards he gradually withdrew from competition climbing and from free soloing, turning to other projects (route development, mentoring, life in the Verdon) and co-founded the magazine Roc 'n Wall, which served as a bible to the burgeoning European free-solo climbing movement. He settled close to Verdon Gorge, where the vacation rental he ran with his Slovak-born wife Matia, Gîte l'Escales in La Palud-sur-Verdon, became a starting-point for rock climbers.

From August 2000 to February 2001, Patrick Berhault undertook a grand traverse of the Alps—spanning 167 days, 22 ascents, and over a thousand kilometers on foot, skis, and mountain bike—traveling from Slovenia to Menton. Sometimes solo and sometimes accompanied by friends, the journey was documented in the film La Cordée de Rêve (2001) by Gilles Chappaz. It was during this expedition—specifically the Dolomites leg—that Patrick Edlinger reunited with his "brother-in-arms," reforming their legendary climbing partnership after 25 years. Together, they tackled several iconic, historic mountaineering routes in high speed times : August 27, 2000: Triglav North Face, 2,863 m (Julian Alps). September 5, 2000: Cima Ovest, 2,973 m (Dolomites), Cassin-Ratti Route. September 6, 2000: Cima Grande, 2,999 m (Dolomites), Brandler-Hasse Route. September 11, 2000: Civetta, 3,218 m (Dolomites), Solleder Route. September 12, 2000: Civetta, Punta Tissi (Dolomites), Phillip-Flamm Route. September 13, 2000: Civetta, Cima Su Alto, 2,958 m (Dolomites), Livanos-Gabriel Route. September 16, 2000: Marmolada, 3,342 m (Dolomites), Voie du Poisson (Fish Route). September 18, 2000: Marmolada di Rocca, 3,265 m (Dolomites), Vinatzer Route with Messner variation. September 25, 2000: Crozzon di Brenta, 3,135 m (Dolomites), pillar of the French. September 26, 2000: Brenta Alta, 2,960 m (Dolomites), Detassis route. Patrick Berhault wrote in his logbook: “Marmolada. Lightning, hail, soaked to the skin. We laugh like kids. »

== Final years and death ==
Haunted by old demons, and by the death in 2004 of his friend and alter-ego, Patrick Berhault, which occurred following a fall in the Swiss Alps, Patrick Edlinger's final years were marked by a long battle against depression and addictions, which he described as the "greatest challenge of my life".

Patrick Edlinger died on November 16, 2012, at the age of 52, after falling down stairs at his home, in his village of La Palud-sur-Verdon. He is survived by his wife, Matia, and their daughter, Nastia, who was 10 years old at the time.

== Tributes and Legacy ==
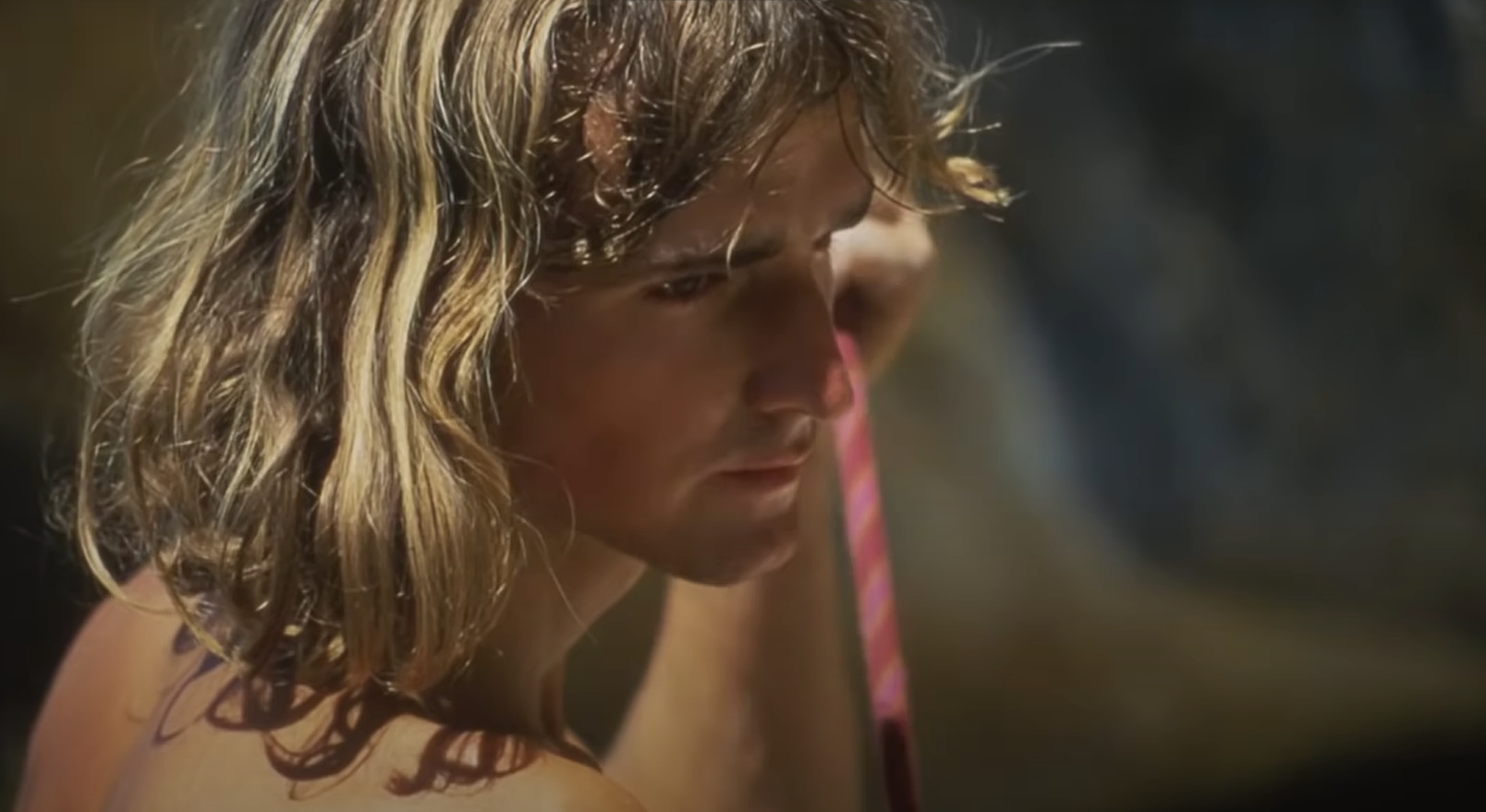
Patrick Edlinger

On this death, tributes came from major global rock climbers including Catherine Destivelle, Lynn Hill, Ron Kauk, Alain Robert, Stefan Glowacz, Ben Moon, Chris Sharma, Adam Ondra, and Jerry Moffatt. Lynn Hill wrote a personal tribute, recalling climbing and working with Edlinger and describing him as an inspiration to her generation. The French minister of sports and youth, Valérie Fourneyron, said of Edlinger, « Patrick was a pioneer in France for free climbing at a high level, a man who had a thirst for the absolute challenge. He refused to compromise and disdained conventions. He dedicated his life to his passion – climbing. He was the first to establish climbing as a true discipline of live art, paving the way for many to climb with respect for nature ».

His legacy is also rememberd in the routes and structures named in his honour: in 2012 Chris Sharma equipped a route called Le Blond in Oliana,(Spain), the climbing gym in Barcelonnette was named after him in 2018, and a 250‑metre route was opened in 2021 in the Verdon Gorge.

== Notable climbs ==
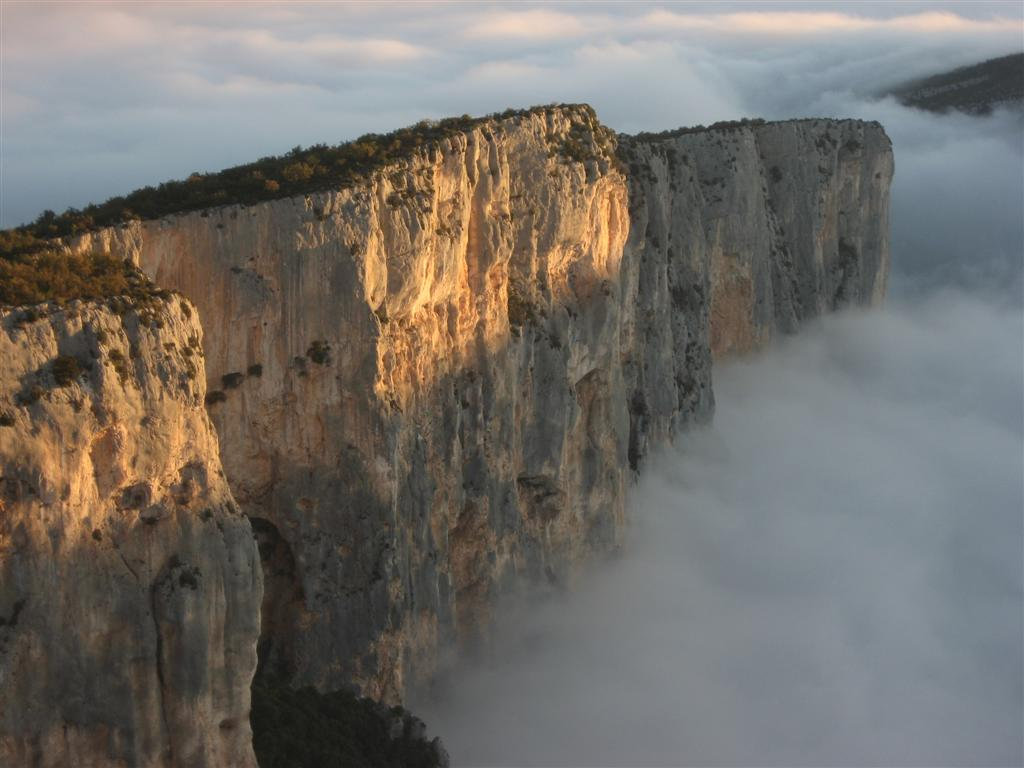
The Verdon Gorges (France)

The following a summary of his notable ascents:

- 8c/5.14b:
  - Maginot Line – Volx (FRA) – 1989 – Second ascent of Ben Moon's route (1989)
  - Azincourt – Buoux (FRA) – 1989 – Ben Moon's route (1989)
  - Le Minimum – Buoux (FRA) – 1989
  - Asymptote – Saint-Crépin (FRA) – 1989 – Second ascent of Antoine Le Menestrel's route (1987)
  - Are you Ready? – Châteauvert (FRA) – 1988 – First ascent
- 8b+/5.14a:
  - Les Spécialistes – Verdon (FRA) – 1989 – Second ascent of Jean-Baptiste Tribout's route (1987)
- 8b/5.13d:
  - Les Sucettes à l'anis – Cimaï (FRA) – 1988 – First ascent
- 8a+/5.13c:
  - La Femme Blanche – Céüse (FRA) – 1985
  - La Boule – Sainte-Victoire (FRA) – 1984 – First ascent
- 8a/5.13b:
  - Orange Mécanique – Cimaï (FRA) – 1989 – Free solo ascent
  - Sphinx Crack – South Platte, Colorado (USA) – 1985
  - Ça Glisse au pays des merveilles – Buoux (FRA) – 1983 – First ascent
- 7c+/5.13a:
  - La Femme Noire (7c/7c+) – Céüse (FRA)
  - Fenrir – Verdon (FRA) – 1982 – First ascent
- 7c/5.12d:
  - Medius – St. Victoire (FRA) – 1981
  - La Polka des ringards – Buoux (FRA) – 1980 – On-sight, the world's first-ever 7c (5.12d) onsight in history.

== Films and documentaries ==
- 1980: Overdon by Jean-Paul Janssen.
- 1981: Over-Ice by Jean-Paul Janssen.
- 1981: Oversand by Jean-Paul Janssen.
- 1982: La Vie Au Bout Des Doigts by Jean-Paul Janssen: nominated for a César Award in 1984 in the Best Documentary Short Film category and adapted in 1984 for a National Geographic documentary series.
- 1984: Opéra Vertical by Jean-Paul Janssen : adapted in 1989 for a National Geographic documentary series.
- 1985: Les Loups Entre Eux by José Giovanni: Patrick, the climber.
- 1986: Les Conquérants de l'Impossible: Portrait de Groupe by Bernard Dumont and Bernard Choquet.
- 1989: Passion Extrême by Georges Auzolat.
- 1992: La Belle Histoire by Claude Lelouch.
- 1994: Le Grec - Georges Livanos by Jean Afanassieff.
- 1997: Roc'n Wall 97 by Maurice Rebeix.
- 1998: Verdon Forever by Maurice Rebeix.
- 1998: Arrow Head by Maurice Rebeix.
- 1999: Escalade : Voyage au bout de l'exploit.
- 2001: La Cordée De Rêve by Gilles Chappaz.
- 2008: Berhault by Gilles Chappaz.

== See also ==
- History of rock climbing
- List of grade milestones in rock climbing
- Free solo climbing
