= Rock Master =

Competition climbing event

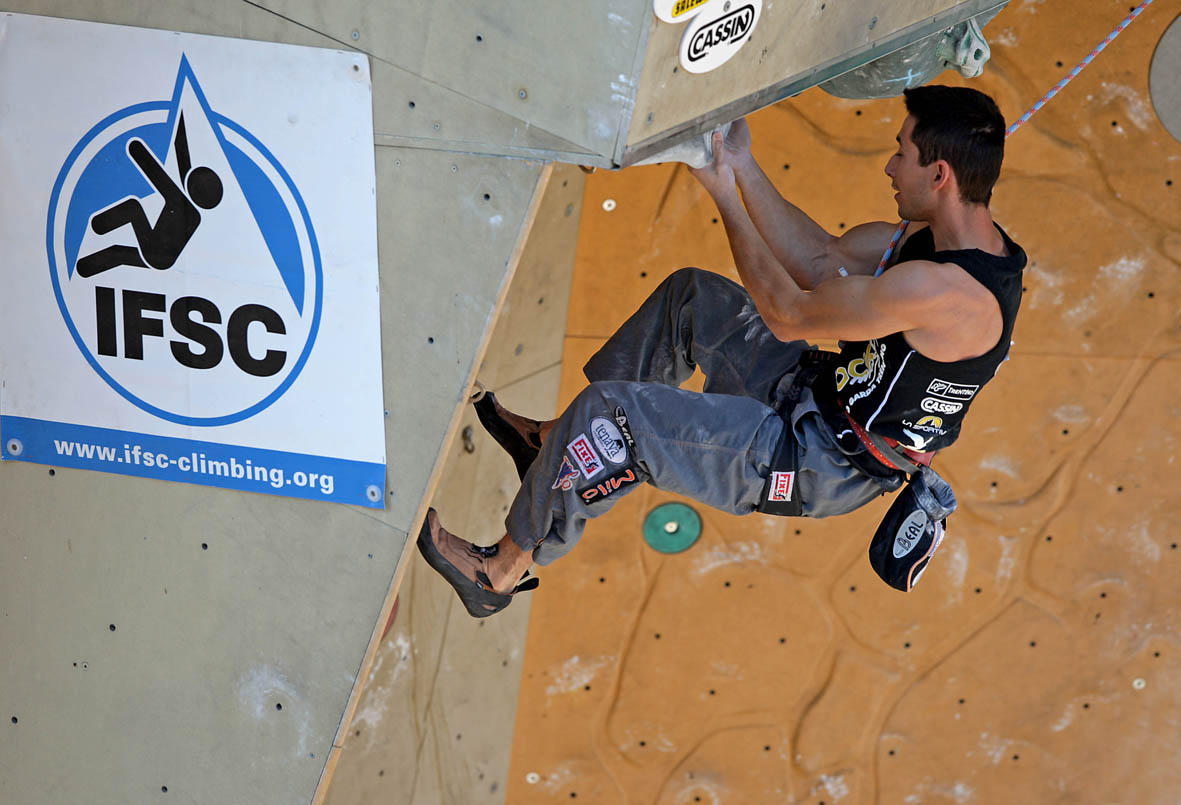

Rock Master is an international competition climbing event that is held every year in Arco, Italy. The event takes place in two rounds: the first is an on-sight session and the second is called "after work". The final classification is given by the sum of the two events. On Friday the athletes are given a chance to survey the work route, and the actual climbing takes place on Saturday and Sunday. At the competition, two prestigious awards, known as the "Oscars of climbing", are presented: the Salewa Rock Award, and the La Sportiva Competition Award.

== History ==
In 1985 it was disputed for the first time Sportroccia to Bardonecchia. The following year the event was tied to a stop at the side of the Colodri of Arc. Right on the wall of the Colodri in 1987, played in the first Rock Master. The following year, the race left the rock and from that moment is played only on artificial in a large open space at the base of Colodri. Since 1999, in addition to lead climbing, bouldering and speed climbing competitions were also held.

Since 2006, during the event, a jury give out the "Arco Rock Legends", two awards that are considered the Oscars of climbing:

- Salewa Rock Award for the athlete with the best performance on single-pitch sport climbs and boulders.
- La Sportiva Competition Award for the best athlete who has competed in the previous competition season.

== Format ==
The competition is usually held the first weekend of September, with a few exceptions:

- in 2010 has been brought forward to July as a pre-event of the World Championship of climbing that would take place in 2011. Instead of the usual two rounds (worked and view) a competition was held to only classical view in three rounds: qualifiers, semi-finals, and finals.
- in 2011 instead of the Rock Master was held in July at the Arco Climbing World Championship in 2011. The title of the Rock Master was, however, given the evidence of the Duel, a competition demonstration that took place at the end of the World Championship and was attended by the first sixteen male and female athletes of the league lead.

In 2012 the speed test was valid also as the fourth leg of the World Cup speed climbing 2012.

== Winners ==
=== Lead ===
Year	Male	Female
1987	(Germany) Stefan Glowacz	(United States) Lynn Hill
1988	(Germany) Stefan Glowacz (France) Patrick Edlinger	(United States) Lynn Hill
1989	(France) Didier Raboutou	(United States) Lynn Hill
1990	(France) François Legrand	(United States) Lynn Hill
1991	(Japan) Yuji Hirayama	(France) Isabelle Patissier
1992	(Germany) Stefan Glowacz	(United States) Lynn Hill
1993	(Switzerland) Elie Chevieux	(Switzerland) Susi Good
1994	(France) François Legrand	(United States) Robyn Erbesfield
1995	(France) François Lombard	(France) Laurence Guyon
1996	(France) François Lombard	(United States) Katie Brown
1997	(France) François Legrand	(United States) Katie Brown
1998	(France) François Legrand	(France) Liv Sansoz
1999	(Russia) Eugeny Ovtchinnikov	(Belgium) Muriel Sarkany
2000	(Russia) Eugeny Ovtchinnikov	(Belgium) Muriel Sarkany
2001	(Germany) Christian Bindhammer (Czech Republic) Tomáš Mrázek (Japan) Yuji Hirayama	(Belgium) Muriel Sarkany (Slovenia) Martina Cufar
2002	(France) Alexandre Chabot	(France) Sandrine Levet
2003	(France) Alexandre Chabot	(Austria) Angela Eiter
2004	(France) Alexandre Chabot	(Austria) Angela Eiter
2005	(Spain) Ramón Julián Puigblanque	(Austria) Angela Eiter
2006	(Spain) Ramón Julián Puigblanque	(France) Sandrine Levet
2007	(Spain) Ramón Julián Puigblanque	(Austria) Angela Eiter
2008	(Spain) Patxi Usobiaga	(Austria) Johanna Ernst
2009	(Spain) Ramón Julián Puigblanque	(Austria) Angela Eiter
2010	(Spain) Ramón Julián Puigblanque	(South Korea) Jain Kim
2011	-	-
2012	(Spain) Ramón Julián Puigblanque	(Austria) Angela Eiter
2013	(Spain) Ramón Julián Puigblanque	(Slovenia) Mina Markovič
2016	(France) Romain Desgranges	(Belgium) Anak Verhoeven
2017	(Austria) Jakob Schubert	(South Korea) Jain Kim
2018	(Austria) Jakob Schubert	(Slovenia) Janja Garnbret

=== Bouldering ===
Year	Male	Female
1999	(Spain) Daniel Andrada	(Russia) Elena Choumilova
2000	(Poland) Tomasz Oleksy	(Russia) Natalia Novikova
2001	(Russia) Salavat Rakhmetov	(France) Corinne Théroux
2002	(Italy) Mauro Calibani	(Russia) Ol'ga Jakovleva
2003	(Italy) Mauro Calibani	(Russia) Olga Bibik
2004	(Switzerland) Matthias Müller	(France) Mélanie Son
2005	(Austria) Kilian Fischhuber	(France) Mélanie Son
2006	(Finland) Nalle Hukkataival	(Austria) Anna Stöhr
2007	(United Kingdom) Gareth Parry	(Austria) Anna Stöhr
2008	(Austria) Kilian Fischhuber	(Austria) Katharina Saurwein
2009	(Austria) Kilian Fischhuber	(France) Alizée Dufraisse
2010	(Switzerland) Cédric Lachat	(Austria) Anna Stöhr
2011	-	-
2012	(Russia) Dmitrij Šarafutdinov	(United States) Alex Puccio
2013	(Russia) Rustam Gelmanov	(United States) Alex Puccio

=== Speed ===
Year	Male	Female
1999	(Ukraine) Vladimir Zakharov	
2000	(Russia) Alexei Gadeev	
2001	(Russia) Iakov Soubotine	
2002	(Poland) Tomasz Oleksy	
2003	(Russia) Alexei Gadeev	
2004	(Poland) Tomasz Oleksy	
2005	(Poland) Tomasz Oleksy	
2006	(Russia) Sergey Sinitsyn	
2007	(Russia) Evgenij Vajcechovskij	
2008	(Venezuela) Manuel Escobar	(Ukraine) Olena Ryepko
2009	(Czech Republic) Libor Hroza	(Poland) Edyta Ropek
2010	(Czech Republic) Libor Hroza	(China) Cuilian He
2011	-	-
2012	(Italy) Leonardo Gontero	(Russia) Alina Gaydamakina
2013	(Czech Republic) Libor Hroza	(Russia) Alina Gaydamakina
2014	(Czech Republic) Libor Hroza	(France) Anouck Jaubert
2018	(Ukraine) Danyil Boldyrev	(Russia) Iuliia Kaplina

=== Duel ===
Year	Male	Female
2000	(Russia) Eugeny Ovtchinnikov	(Belgium) Muriel Sarkany
2009	(Spain) Ramón Julián Puigblanque	(Austria) Angela Eiter
2010	(Czech Republic) Adam Ondra	(Austria) Katharina Posch
2011	(Czech Republic) Adam Ondra	(Russia) Yana Chereshneva
2012	(Austria) Jakob Schubert	(Russia) Dinara Fakhritdinova
2013	(Canada) Sean McColl	(Russia) Dinara Fakhritdinova
2014	(Canada) Sean McColl	(Russia) Dinara Fakhritdinova
2015	(Czech Republic) Adam Ondra	(France) Hélène Janicot
2016	(Czech Republic) Adam Ondra	(Slovenia) Janja Garnbret
2017	(Czech Republic) Adam Ondra	(France) Julia Chanourdie
2018	(Czech Republic) Adam Ondra	(Slovenia) Janja Garnbret
2019	(Austria) Jakob Schubert	(Slovenia) Mia Krampl
2021	(Italy) Stefano Ghisolfi	(Slovenia) Mia Krampl
2022	(Austria) Jakob Schubert	(Austria) Jessica Pilz
2023	(Czech Republic) Adam Ondra	(Slovenia) Janja Garnbret
2024	(Italy) Filip Schenk	(Austria) Jessica Pilz
2025	(Czech Republic) Adam Ondra	(United States) Brooke Raboutou

=== KO Boulder ===
Year	Male	Female
2010	(Switzerland) Cedric Lachat	(Austria) Anna Stöhr
2012	(Russia) Dmitrii Sharafutdinov	(United States) Alex Puccio
2013	(Russia) Rustam Gelmanov	(United States) Alex Puccio
2014	(Slovenia) Jernej Kruder	(United States) Alex Puccio
2016	(Czech Republic) Adam Ondra	(Austria) Katharina Saurwein
2017	(South Korea) Chon Jong-won	(United States) Alex Puccio
2018	(Russia) Alexey Rubtsov	(France) Fanny Gibert
2021	(Czech Republic) Adam Ondra	(Italy) Laura Rogora
2022	(Austria) Jakob Schubert	(Austria) Jessica Pilz
2023	(Czech Republic) Adam Ondra	(Slovenia) Janja Garnbret
2024	(Germany) Yannick Flohé	(Austria) Jessica Pilz
2025	(Germany) Yannick Flohé	(Slovenia) Janja Garnbret

=== Arco Rock Legends ===
Year	Salewa Rock Award	La Sportiva Competition Award
2006	(Spain) Josune Bereziartu	(Austria) Angela Eiter
2007	(Spain) Patxi Usobiaga	(Austria) David Lama
2008	(Czech Republic) Adam Ondra	(Slovenia) Maja Vidmar
2009	(United States) Chris Sharma	(Austria) Kilian Fischhuber
2010	(Czech Republic) Adam Ondra	(Japan) Akiyo Noguchi
2011	(Czech Republic) Adam Ondra	(Spain) Ramón Julián Puigblanque
2012	(United States) Sasha DiGiulian	(Austria) Anna Stöhr
2013	(Czech Republic) Adam Ondra	(Slovenia) Mina Markovič
2014	(Belgium) Muriel Sarkany	(Spain) Urko Carmona Barandiaran
2015	(Germany) Alexander Megos	(Czech Republic) Adam Ondra
2016	(Spain) Daniel Andrada	(Slovenia) Mina Markovič
2017	(United States) Margo Hayes	(Slovenia) Janja Garnbret

== Editions ==
=== 2018 (32nd) ===
==== Lead Duel ====
Joannes was leading McColl when he peeled off a crimp towards the finish. Shiraishi had been beaten by Garnbret, and her final lunge for the finish pad at 2:34 fell short. Women's jersey 6 was tied with Rogora but peeled off trying to navigate past the same crimp Joannes fell on, only for Rogora herself to undershoot the finish pad at 2:39. Chanourdie had been beaten by Pilz when she failed to stick the second to last hold at 2:32. Ruidigier was leading Ghisolfi when he peeled off the same crimp at 1:12. Koller slapped the pad ahead of Verhoeven at 1:33 but undershot.

===== Men's Qualifications =====
Race 1
Jul 29
Stefano Ghisolfi	1:42
Marcello Bombardi	1:48

Race 2
Jul 29
Jakob Schubert	1:25.7
Adam Ondra	1:24.6

Race 3
Jul 29
Sean McColl	1:43
Thomas Joannes	DNF

Race 4
Jul 29
Max Rudigier	1:39
Alexander Megos	1:44

Race 5
Jul 29
Jan Hojer	1:33
Domen Škofic	1:50

===== Men's Finals =====
Quarter-finals
Jul 29
Adam Ondra	1:13
Marcello Bombardi	1:27
Jul 29
Max Rudigier	DNF
Stefano Ghisolfi	1:40
Jul 29
Jakob Schubert	1:21
Alexander Megos	1:24
Jul 29
Jan Hojer	1:17
Sean McColl	1:15

Semi-finals
Jul 29
Adam Ondra	1:10
Stefano Ghisolfi	1:15
Jul 29
Jakob Schubert	1:11
Sean McColl	1:09

Final
Jul 29
Adam Ondra	103.19
Sean McColl	103.22
Third place
Jul 29
Stefano Ghisolfi	1:09
Jakob Schubert	1:06

===== Women's Qualifications =====
Race 1
Jul 29
Anne-Sophie Koller	2:38
Anak Verhoeven	2:24

Race 2
Jul 29
Ashima Shiraishi	DNF
Jessica Pilz	2:04

Race 3
Jul 29
6	DNF
Laura Rogora	DNF

Race 4
Jul 29
Janja Garnbret	2:08
Mina Markovič	3:04

Race 5
Jul 29
Molly Thompson-Smith	2:05
Julia Chanourdie	DNF

===== Women's Finals =====
Quarter-finals
Jul 29
Jessica Pilz	1:54
Ashima Shiraishi	2:09
Jul 29
Anak Verhoeven	1:54
Anne-Sophie Koller	DNF
Jul 29
Julia Chanourdie	1:54
Laura Rogora	2:13
Jul 29
Janja Garnbret	1:37
Mina Markovič	2:39

Semi-finals
Jul 29
Jessica Pilz	1:30
Anak Verhoeven	1:36
Jul 29
Julia Chanourdie	1:25
Janja Garnbret	1:23

Final
Jul 29
Jessica Pilz	1:18
Janja Garnbret	1:11
Third place
Jul 29
Anak Verhoeven	1:24.0
Julia Chanourdie	1:24.4

==== KO Boulder ====
The first problem's crux involved matching hands on a sloper and reaching left to the finish hold. In the first round on the first problem, Kruder dynoed the first move of the first problem. Rubtsov tried this on his second attempt and became the first to stick the crux sloper and top the problem. Vezonik tried it after Rubtsov, having been unable to progress to the crux on his initial static attempt, but was unable to stick the dyno, and the second time he stuck the crux sloper but could not advance, so he jokingly grabbed the top of the wall instead. Piazza was unable to secure himself on the holds below the crux, barn dooring off his third, dynamic, attempt, upon which he was eliminated.

The second problem was more difficult. It's crux involved a series of three pinches, which none could stick on their first try. Hojer became the first to solve it, using a static heel hook technique, then progressing to the final hold but failing to match hands. Kruder solved it more dynamically right after him, but could not fully reach the second to last hold. Mawem and Piccolruaz were unable to progress to the crux, so they were eliminated.

The third problem had a slab start with a lean far to the left, which Vezonik stuck on his first attempt, only to barn door trying to reach the next hold. Rubtsov succeeded in sticking the lean and reaching the next hold on his second attempt, but could not stick the crimp before the finish hold. Vezonik stuck the next hold on his second attempt, but fell off switching hands. After two attempts, Kruder was unable to stick the lean, while Hojer was unable to reach any handholds at all even after a third attempt, so Hojer was eliminated.

The fourth problem was substantially easier for the remaining contestants than the previous problems. It had a crack start to an overhang and a climb to a sloper that required mantling the second to last hold to reach. On his first and only attempt, Kruder was able to touch, but not hold, the final hold. Then Rubtsov and Vezonik both onsighted the problem, eliminating Kruder.

===== Men's =====
Name	Problem			
Name	1	2	3	4
Alexey Rubtsov	T	-4 (-2)	-1	O
Gregor Vezonik	-1	-4 (-2)	-2	O
Jernej Kruder	-2 (-1)	-2 (-1)	-6 (-5)	-1 (O)
Jan Hojer	-2 (-1)	-1 (T)	-6	/
Mickaël Mawem	-2 (-1)	-5	/	/
Michael Piccolruaz	-2 (-1)	-5	/	/
Riccardo Piazza	-3	/	/	/

=== 2021 (34th) ===
The men's and women's routes were of the same difficulty. Gibert had been beaten by Lukan when she lunged for a dyno, missing the finish pad at 2:04. Fossali had been beaten by Ondra when he peeled off the ceiling at 2:30. Stráník had been beaten by Piccolruaz when he peeled off lunging for the final hold at 1:22. Flohé had been beaten by Ghisolfi when he peeled off at 1:13, swinging for the final hold. Rogora was beaten by Lukan while on the last hold, but she peeled off. Flohé had been beaten by Ondra when he peeled off at 1:12, lunging for the final hold.

==== Lead Duel ====
===== Men's =====
Quarter-finals
Aug 27
Adam Ondra	1:17
Ludovico Fossali	DNF
Aug 27
Martin Stráník	DNF
Michael Piccolruaz	1:20
Aug 27
Yannick Flohé	1:22
Domen Škofic	1:26
Aug 27
Filip Schenk	1:27
Stefano Ghisolfi	1:18

Semi-finals
Aug 27
Adam Ondra	1:07.32
Michael Piccolruaz	1:07.22
Aug 27
Yannick Flohé	DNF
Stefano Ghisolfi	1:12

Final
Aug 27
Michael Piccolruaz	1:10.1
Stefano Ghisolfi	1:09.0
Third place
Aug 27
Adam Ondra	1:11
Yannick Flohé	DNF

===== Women's =====
Quarter-finals
Aug 27
Laura Rogora	1:51
Giorgia Tesio	2:17
Aug 27
Mia Krampl	1:40
Molly Thompson-Smith	1:44
Aug 27
Vita Lukan	1:56
Fanny Gibert	DNF
Aug 27
Jessica Pilz	1:46
Eliška Adamovská	2:02

Semi-finals
Aug 27
Laura Rogora	1:34.2
Mia Krampl	1:33.5
Aug 27
Vita Lukan	1:33.8
Jessica Pilz	1:32.4

Final
Aug 27
Mia Krampl	1:24
Jessica Pilz	1:30?
Third place
Aug 27
Laura Rogora	DNF
Vita Lukan	1:28

==== KO Boulder ====
Climbers got three chances each to complete the boulder problem each round. Points were assigned after each round, taking into account the highest reached hold and the number of attempts. In case of a tie, the points of the previous rounds would decide who advances or wins.

===== Men's =====
The first problem moved from a sloper volume to two pinch volumes to two crimps to a final pinch before the finish hold. Škofic fell off right after gripping the starting hold, eliciting laughter from the crowd. Flohé got to the crimp pair right after him but could not advance on his first two attempt, topping the problem on his third. Ondra found a knee bar between the pinches and onsighted the problem. Stráník got as far as Flohé using a different sequence but encountered a similar issue on his first attempt, topping it on his second. Schenk reached the same point on his first attempt, but could not progress on his other attempts. Piccolruaz unsuccessfully attempted a dyno to the second hold, then could not pass the pinches on his next two attempts. After three attempts each, Ghisolfi and Fossali could not master the initial dyno. The same happened to Škofic on his second and third attempts. As that left three competitors tied for last, the judges decided to eliminate the bottom four competitors on the next boulder.

The next problem involved a stepping dyno to press, followed by a crimp to a sloper volume, followed by a gaston volume to the finish crimp. Škofic reached, but could not stick, the dyno. Flohé stuck it but could not progress beyond the crimp on any attempt. Ondra reached the sloper volume in his first attempt but fell off matching hands, and on his two succeeding attempts in the following gaston. Ghisolfi, Stráník, Piccolruaz, Schenk, and Fossali all had difficulty securing themselves on the initial dyno. Ondra and Ghisolfi cleaned each others' holds. But of the climbers who could not begin the upward climb, only Stráník and Schenk stuck the dyno well enough to begin advancing, and only on their second and third attempt, respectively.

The third was a body tension problem. Flohé and Schenk peeled off the first hold, Ondra and Stráník could not get into position for the reach at the third, and the only thing that changed with further attempts was Schenk reaching the second hold, Stráník getting close to reach position twice, and Ondra reaching out to touch the next hold on his final attempt. As a result, Flohé was eliminated.

The fourth was an overhanging problem with a mantle to finish. Ondra onsighted the problem. Stráník and Schenk both came as far as the sidepull crimp before the finish hold on their first attempt. Neither could improve their progress after attempting to exhaustion.

Name	Problem			
Name	1	2	3	4
Adam Ondra	O	-1	-3 (-2)	O
Martin Stráník	T	-4	-3	-1
Filip Schenk	-2	-4	-3	-1
Yannick Flohé	T	-3	-4	/
Stefano Ghisolfi	-6 (-5)	-5	/	/
Michael Piccolruaz	-3 (-2)	-5 (-4)	/	/
Ludovico Fossali	-6 (-5)	-5 (-4)	/	/
Domen Škofic	-6 (-5)	-5 (-4)	/	/

===== Women's =====
The first problem was overhanging. Most onsighted it, but Lukan missed the final hold and Krampl could not stick it. Tesio could not stick the second to last hold, a pinch. Lukan, Krampl, and Tesio competed for the final remaining place, Lukan topping the route. But then Adamovská was forced to repeat the problem due to a starting technicality, and she peeled off at the pinch. Krampl topped the route, as did Tesio, but Tesio peeled off at the top. On her third try, Adamovská again could not stick the pinch, and Tesio could not match on the top.

The second problem was a series of volumes, which Gibert onsighted. Pilz slipped off while on the third to last volume. Lukan onsighted it, reaching the top of the finishing hold. Rogora onsighted it, finishing in a no-hands kneebar. Krampl came off one hand ahead of Pilz and Thompson one hand behind her. On their second attempts, Pilz could struggled to match hands again, Krampl got as far as Thompson had, and Thompson again reached the same spot. On their third attempts, Pilz and Krampl topped the route, but Thompson could not. This left Thompson eliminated by the problem, and Krampl eliminated on "the sum of the results of the two boulders".

The third problem was a slab. The initial dynamic move was first completed by Lukan, who onsighted it, followed by Rogora. This left a battle between Gibert and Pilz not to be eliminated. On their second attempt, Gibert and Pilz both completed the dyno, but fell off on the next move. On their third attempt, Gibert had the same difficulty, but Pilz only could not match hands on the final hold.

The final problem involved a vertical press to a lie-back to a crimp to a sloper. All three remaining competitors onsighted it, so the competition's winner was decided on accumulated points, making Rogora the winner.

Name	Problem			
Name	1	2	3	4
(Italy) Laura Rogora	O	O	O	O
(Slovenia) Vita Lukan	T	O	O	O
(Austria) Jessica Pilz	O	T	0	O
(France) Fanny Gibert	O	O	-3 (-2)	/
(Slovenia) Mia Krampl	T	T	/	/
(United Kingdom) Molly Thompson	O	-3 (-1)	/	/
(Czech Republic) Eliška Adamovská	O	/	/	/
(Italy) Giorgia Tesio	0	/	/	/

=== 2022 (35th) ===
Rogora was leading Lukan when she fell off. Zhang was leading Moroni when she fell off. Stráník was trailing Schubert when he fell off. Schenk was trailing Piccolruaz when he fell off. Stráník and Schenk fell off the same sloper. Piccolruaz was trailing Schubert when he fell off.

==== Lead Duel ====
===== Men's =====
Quarter-finals
Jul 29
Jakob Schubert	1:12
Luka Potočar	1:26
Jul 29
Martin Stráník	1:18
Stefano Ghisolfi	1:23
Jul 29
Filip Schenk	1:23
Nicolai Užnik	1:34
Jul 29
Michael Piccolruaz	1:30
Fedir Samoilov	1:41

Semi-finals
Jul 29
Jakob Schubert	1:04
Martin Stráník	DNF
Jul 29
Filip Schenk	DNF
Michael Piccolruaz	1:17

Final
Jul 29
Jakob Schubert	1:01
Michael Piccolruaz	DNF
Third place
Jul 29
Martin Stráník	1:13.8
Filip Schenk	1:12.6

===== Women's =====
Quarter-finals
Jul 29
Seo Chae-hyun	1:47
Staša Gejo	2:34
Jul 29
Jessica Pilz	1:34
Jenya Kazbekova	1:38
Jul 29
Vita Lukan	1:45
Laura Rogora	DNF
Jul 29
Zhang Yuetong	DNF
Camilla Moroni	2:34

Semi-finals
Jul 29
Seo Chae-hyun	1:27.9
Jessica Pilz	1:27.2
Jul 29
Vita Lukan	1:49
Camilla Moroni	1:54

Final
Jul 29
Jessica Pilz	1:25.3
Vita Lukan	1:25.7

=== 2023 (36th) ===
==== Lead Duel ====
The women's route was graded 8a, the men's 8b, but as usual the use of both route's holds was allowed, so long as the correct line was clipped. The two routes merged at the ceiling. Both the duel between Grupper and Scherz and that between Schubert and Piccolruaz had to be restarted because of false starts.

===== Men's =====
Quarter-finals
Sep 1
Adam Ondra	1:15
Toby Roberts	1:55
Sep 1
Jesse Grupper	1:28.0
Stefan Scherz	1:29.3
Sep 1
Jakob Schubert	1:16
Stefano Ghisolfi	1:33
Sep 1
Michael Piccolruaz	1:24
Taisei Homma	1:35

Semi-finals
Sep 1
Adam Ondra	1:08
Jesse Grupper	1:25
Sep 1
Jakob Schubert	1:08
Michael Piccolruaz	1:15

Final
Sep 1
Adam Ondra	1:01.1
Jakob Schubert	1:04.0

===== Women's =====
Quarter-finals
Sep 1
Janja Garnbret	1:43
Natsuki Tanii	2:21
Sep 1
Hanna Meul	1:39.9
Laura Rogora	1:40.1
Sep 1
Jessica Pilz	1:39
Camilla Moroni	1:54
Sep 1
Brooke Raboutou	1:36
Vita Lukan	1:50

Semi-finals
Sep 1
Janja Garnbret	1:26
Hanna Meul	1:52
Sep 1
Jessica Pilz	1:25
Brooke Raboutou	1:23

Final
Sep 1
Janja Garnbret	1:10
Brooke Raboutou	?

=== 2024 (37th) ===
The use of both route's holds was allowed, so long as the correct line was clipped. The two routes merged at the ceiling. Piccolruaz false started, so Schenk advanced automatically. Pötzi was leading Rogora when she fell off. Posch was trailing Potočar when he fell off. Ondra nearly beat Van Duysen with a time of 1:04, only for his final dyno to fall short of the finish pad.

==== Lead Duel ====
===== Men's =====
Quarter-finals
Sep 18
Filip Schenk	0:00
Michael Piccolruaz	DSQ
Sep 18
Luka Potočar	1:34
Jan-Luca Posch	DNF
Sep 18
Yannick Flohé	1:23
Stefano Ghisolfi	1:32
Sep 18
Hannes Van Duysen	1:22
Adam Ondra	DNF

Semi-finals
Sep 18
Filip Schenk	1:13
Luka Potočar	1:18
Sep 18
Yannick Flohé	1:11
Hannes Van Duysen	1:07

Final
Sep 18
Filip Schenk	1:10
Hannes Van Duysen	1:16

===== Women's =====
Quarter-finals
Sep 18
Jessica Pilz	1:17
Oceana Mackenzie	1:24
Sep 18
Camilla Moroni	1:41
Lucia Dörffel	1:45
Sep 18
Sara Čopar	1:29
Vita Lukan	1:39
Sep 18
Mattea Pötzi	DNF
Laura Rogora	1:??

Semi-finals
Sep 18
Jessica Pilz	1:23
Camilla Moroni	1:38
Sep 18
Sara Čopar	1:20
Laura Rogora	1:34

Final
Sep 18
Jessica Pilz	1:14.6
Sara Čopar	1:15.8

==== KO Boulder ====
===== Men's =====
The first problem's crux was a dyno to gaston. Flohé onsighted it, while the remaining climbers successively could not stick the crux until Piccolruaz, whose foot slipped just before the final move; then Ondra onsighted it, adding second dyno to the finish hold. On their second attempts, Posch and Van Duysen topped the route, Piccolruaz matched hands on the final could but could not stick it, Schenk could not reach the final hold, Potočar still could not stick the crux, and Ghisolfi peeled off an early sidepull. On their final attempt, Schenk topped it, Ghisolfi and Potočar still could not stick the crux.

The second problem's crux involved compression moves between four volumes. On their first attempts, Flohé, Van Duysen topped the problem, Posch and Piccolruaz struggled with the crux, and Schenk and Ondra struggled to reach the crux. This slated Schenk and Ondra for elimination. On their second attempts, Posch reached the final hold but slipped off, Piccolruaz improved by one move, and Schenk and Ondra failed to improve. On their final attempts, Schenk again came off before reaching the crux and Piccolruaz (who had previously made it further) came off at the same hold, but this time, Ondra progressed to the top. So Schenk and Piccolruaz were eliminated.

The third problem's crux was a three link slab, which was followed by a dyno to the top from crimps. Flohé struggled the most and Ondra the least, but all failed to secure themselves on the same hold. On their second attempts, Flohé caught up, Posch fell off early, as did Van Duysen due to a foot slip, and though Ondra got "closer and closer" to holding the target hold, no scorable progress was made. On their final attempts, none of the competitors could improve except Ondra, who progressed through the crux to match hands on the final hold, only to slip. As a three way tie, previous problems were used to eliminate Posch.

The final problem involved campusing sequences. Flohé onsighted it, Van Duysen could not stick the second to last hold, and Ondra peeled off the second hold, so Flohé won. On their second attempts, Van Duysen topped it on his final attempt, but Ondra slipped off a reach to the upper campus series.

Name	Problem			
Name	1	2	3	4
Yannick Flohé	O	O	-3 (-2)	O
Hannes Van Duysen	T	O	-3 (-2)	T
Adam Ondra	O	T	-1 (T)	-3
Jan-Luca Posch	T	-1 (T)	-3 (-2)	/
Michael Piccolruaz	-1 (T)	-2 (-1)	/	/
Filip Schenk	T	-5 (-4)	/	/
Luka Potočar	-3 (-2)	/	/	/
Stefano Ghisolfi	-3 (-2)	/	/	/

===== Women's =====
The first boulder involved a step dyno, followed by a sidepull into a gaston. After the failure of Pötzi to stick the dyno, Lukan and Mackenzie reached gaston position on the finish hold but could not match hands. Pilz, Rogora, and Moroni then succeeded in matching hands. Dörffel had the same issue with the gaston as Lukan and Mackenzie, but Čopar also onsighted the problem. This set Pötzi up for elimination, but since Pötzi matched hands at the finish on her second attempt, Lukan, Mackenzie, and Dörffel competed to remain in the competition. Lukan's right foot slipped before she could reach for the finish hold, and Mackenzie and Dörffel again failed to match hands. On the third round of attempts, Lukan and Mackenzie continued to struggle at the gaston, but Dörffel topped the route, eliminating Lukan and Mackenzie.

The second problem involved navigating below a large hexagonal volume in press position, then climbing up to a mantle on top of the volume. Pötzi had difficulty with the start, Pilz onsighted it, Rogora lacked the strength to complete the mantle. Moroni and Čopar was stuck on the same move as Pötzi, but Dörffel onsighted it. On their second attempts, Pötzi and Moroni could only reach the undercling below the hexagon, while Rogora and Čopar could not improve their previous progressions. This set at least Čopar for elimination. None of the competitors could improve on their third attempts, with Rogora peeling off the start hold due to the slip of a foot and Moroni coming one move short of her furthest point. The judges decided Pötzi would join Čopar in elimination.

The third problem moved from an undercling sidepull series with toehooks through a sidepull and crimps to a gaston to finish. Pilz could not latch on to the crimp before peeling. Rogora came off on the same hold, with a reach issue. Moroni reached the gaston on her first attempt. Dörffel struggled with the starting series, slating her for elimination. On their second attempts, Pilz could not improve, Rogora fell off where Dörffel did, Moroni even lower on the starting series, whereas Dörffel was able reach Pilz and Rogora's high point. On their final attempts, Pilz obtained a stronger latch on one, but not both, of the crimps, placing her ahead of Rogora and Dörffel. Rogora failed to improve, while Moroni and Dörffel came off at the modal peel point. The judges eliminated Dörffel over Rogora.

The final problem was sloper heavy, involving a swinging stepping dyno to the largest sloper. On their first attempts, Rogora could not stick the first sloper, whereas Pilz and Moroni had difficulty sticking the dyno. None progressed further on their second attempt, and on their third, Rogora could not pass the first sloper, while Moroni reached the next hold during the dyno, but could not stick either the big sloper or that hold. The judges decided to split the tie by the results of the previous problems.

Name	Problem			
Name	1	2	3	4
Jessica Pilz	O	O	-4 (-3)	-5 (-4)
Camilla Moroni	O	-4 (-3)	-2 (-1)	-5 (-3)
Laura Rogora	O	-1	-4 (-3)	-6
Lucia Dörffel	T	O	-4 (-3)	/
Mattea Pötzi	T	-4 (-3)	/	/
Sara Čopar	O	-4	/	/
Vita Lukan	-1 (0)	/	/	/
Oceana Mackenzie	-1 (0)	/	/	/

=== 2025 (38th) ===
==== Lead Duel ====
The route was 16 metres (52 ft) tall, with a 12 metres (39 ft) overhang, consisting of 42 holds for an overall difficulty of 8b.

===== Men's =====
After a close battle, Van Duysen touched the finish pad with his foot.

Quarter-finals
Oct 19
(Czech Republic) Adam Ondra	1:19
(Italy) Giovanni Placci	1:37
Oct 19
(United Kingdom) William Bosi	1:25
(Austria) Stefan Scherz	1:38
Oct 19
(Belgium) Hannes Van Duysen	1:25
(Italy) Filip Schenk	:1:19
Oct 19
(Germany) Yannick Flohé	1:18
(Italy) Stefano Ghisolfi	1:26

Semi-finals
Oct 19
(Czech Republic) Adam Ondra	1:14
(United Kingdom) William Bosi	1:29
Oct 19
(Italy) Filip Schenk	1:11
(Germany) Yannick Flohé	1:16

Final
Oct 19
(Czech Republic) Adam Ondra	1:04.7
(Italy) Filip Schenk	1:06.6
Third place
Oct 19
(Germany) Yannick Flohé	1:16.7
(United Kingdom) William Bosi	1:17.6

===== Women's =====
Doumont and Pötzi were trailing Apel and Rogora when they fell.

Quarter-finals
Oct 19
(United States) Brooke Raboutou	1:10
(Slovenia) Janja Garnbret	1:??
Oct 19
(Germany) Anna Maria Apel	1:50
(Belgium) Heloïse Doumont	DNF
Oct 19
(Austria) Jessica Pilz	1:42
(Japan) Mei Kotake	1:52
Oct 19
(Italy) Laura Rogora	1:48
(Austria) Mattea Pötzi	DNF

Semi-finals
Oct 19
(United States) Brooke Raboutou	1:22
(Germany) Anna Maria Apel	1:49
Oct 19
(Austria) Jessica Pilz	1:26
(Italy) Laura Rogora	1:36

Final
Oct 19
(United States) Brooke Raboutou	1:14
(Austria) Jessica Pilz	1:21
Third place
Oct 19
(Germany) Anna Maria Apel	1:26
(Italy) Laura Rogora	1:30

==== KO Boulder ====
===== Men's =====
The first problem was a long compression series. Will Bosi went first, slipping on the textureless starting ledge while in an early gaston. He was followed by Schenk, who slipped matching hands on the same hold. Flohé was able to pass the slippery initial foothold with a more dynamic solution but peeled off the third to last hold after his heel slipped. With the accumulated beta, Van Duysen and Ondra were able to onsight the problem. But Ghisolfi and Placci tried the earlier, static sequence, both slipping off, while Scherz, Bosi, and Schenk could not adapt to the dynamic solution. On his second attempt, Ghisolfi surprised the crowd with a static solution to the starting sequence but did not progress as far as Flohé, unlike Scherz. Placci followed Ghisolfi in the static solution but came off close to where Flohé reached. On his final attempt, Bosi could not improve, leaving him eliminated. Schenk succeeded with the static method and topped the problem. Flohé and Ghisolfi also topped the problem, but Scherz fell off on the final gaston, slating him for elimination along with Bosi unless Placci could not climb further. As Placci fell off the first move, Scherz went through.

The second problem had a double undercling start to a long sloper series involving a stepping dyno. Schenk went first, with incomplete progression to the second to last sloper. Flohé and Van Duysen onsighted the problem. Ondra and Ghisolfi could not stick the dyno. Scherz had the same issue as Schenk. On his second attempt, Schenk could not stick the dyno, but Ondra did and progressed to the same high point as Schenk and Scherz. Ghisolfi again could not stick the dyno, slating him for elimination if he could not improve. On their third attempts, all remaining climbers failed to improve their high points. Ondra was also eliminated, on points.

The third problem was a slab, Schenk and Flohé had difficulty completing a step-through to lean sequence, while Van Duysen and Scherz slipped off the beginning. On their second attempts, only Scherz improved, reaching as far as Flohé. On their third attempt, Schenk failed to improve, but Flohé increased his stability on the second to last hold of the bottom sequence, which Van Duysen progressed through to reach the top. Scherz also failed to improve, which eliminated him.

The fourth problem was overhanging. Schenk fell on an early twisting campus move. Flohé onsighted the problem. Van Duysen got further than Schenk but could not pinch the top of the large volume. On their second attempts, Schenk failed to stick the twist, while Van Duysen did not progress much, so Flohé won. On their final attempts, Schenk fell off at the start and Van Duysen reached the same point as his previous attempt.

Name	Problem			
Name	1	2	3	4
(Germany) Yannick Flohé	T	O	-4	O
(Belgium) Hannes Van Duysen	O	O	T	-4 (-3)
(Italy) Filip Schenk	T	-2 (-1)	-6 (-5)	-6 (-5)
(Austria) Stefan Scherz	-2 (-1)	-2 (-1)	-6 (-4)	/
(Czech Republic) Adam Ondra	O	-2 (0)	/	/
(Italy) Stefano Ghisolfi	T	-5 (-4)	/	/
(Italy) Giovanni Placci	-3	/	/	/
(United Kingdom) Will Bosi	-6 (-5)	/	/	/

===== Women's =====
The first proved exceptionally easy. It became difficult at a pinch problem, followed by drop knee to a crimp, then consecutive slopers. Pötzi went first, peeling off the first sloper. The remaining competitors flashed the problem except Kotake, who could not complete the pinch section. With that, Pötzi and Kotake were eliminated. On her second attempt, Pötzi could not stick the final sloper, while Kotake completed the problem. Pötzi completed it on her third try.

The second problem involved a reachy to dynamic series followed by a sloper series. Raboutou went first, flashing it, as did Pilz and Garnbret. Apel failed to stick the dyno, Rogora failed on the final move, and Doumont slipped off the first hold. On her second go, Apel topped the problem, but Rogora fell repeating her static solution to the reachy section, and Doumont failed to stick the dyno. So Rogora and Doumont were eliminated. On their final attempts, Rogora and Doumont fell off at the same point as their second attempts.

The third problem was a slab whose crux came at the end with a pistol squat followed by a right reach. Raboutou touched but could not stick the final hold. Pilz lost her balance on the lean to reach the crux. Apel and Garnbret flashed the problem, leaving Raboutou and Pilz to battle for progression. On her second attempt, Raboutou topped the problem, but Pilz slipped off one hold before her previous high point and was eliminated.

The final problem was significantly overhanging. Raboutou and Apel both struggled on the first peel-off, which Garnbret passed with ease, onsighting the problem and winning the tournament. In the battle for second, Raboutou got to the second to last hold but could not progress further on her final attempt, whereas Apel could not progress initially but reached the third to last hold on her final attempt.

Name	Problem			
Name	1	2	3	4
(Slovenia) Janja Garnbret	O	O	O	O
(United States) Brooke Raboutou	O	O	T	-1
(Germany) Anna Maria Apel	O	T	O	-3
(Austria) Jessica Pilz	O	O	-3 (-2)	/
(Italy) Laura Rogora	O	-1 (0)	/	/
(Belgium) Heloïse Doumont	O	-5 (-3)	/	/
(Japan) Mei Kotake	T	/	/	/
(Austria) Mattea Pötzi	T	/	/	/

== Bibliography ==
- Malfer, Giulio; Stefanello, Vinicio (2005). Rock Master. Nicolodi. ISBN 978-8884471949.
