= Sportroccia =

First major rock climbing competition

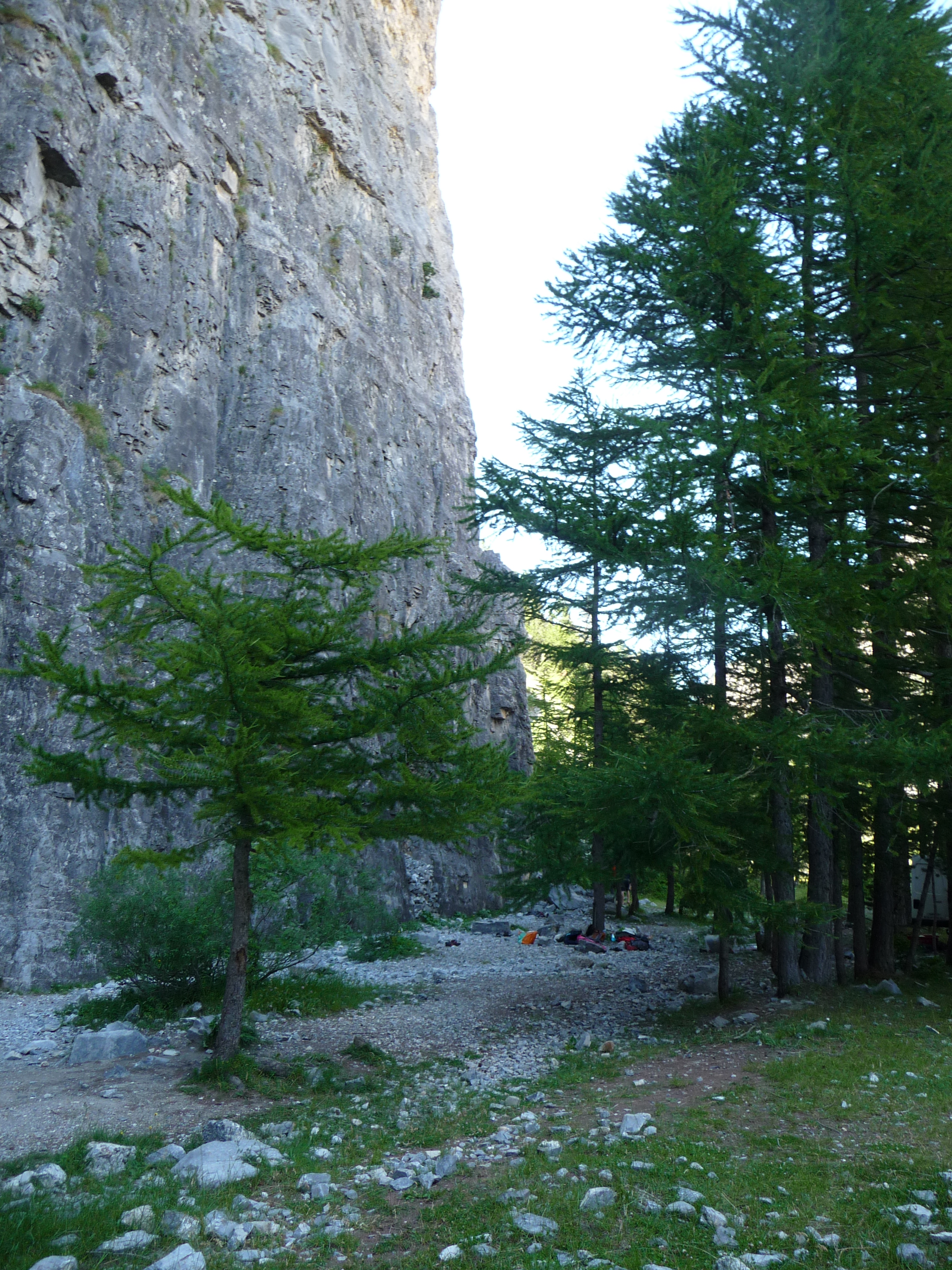
Parete dei Militi climbing face used for Sportriccia

Sportroccia was the very first international climbing competition. Four annual Sportroccia editions were held in 1985, 1986, 1988, and 1989, in the village of Bardonecchia and Arco, Italy.

== History ==
The first edition of Sportroccia was organized in 1985 on the initiative of Andrea Mellano, a strong climber of the '60s and a member of the Italian Academic Alpine Club, and the journalist and writer Emmanuel Cassara. The jury was composed of Riccardo Cassin, Oscar Soravito, Maurizio Zanolla and Heinz Mariacher. The competition was contested on the Parete dei Militi (Wall of the Soldiers) in Valle Stretta, near Bardonecchia. The fact that the races were held on the rock and not on artificial walls put the organizers in the vanguard of several issues that eventually led to moving climbing competitions to artificial walls only.

- In 1985 and 1986, Sportroccia was also used to proclaim the Italian champion, giving the title to the best Italian athletes in the competition.
- In 1986, the event was divided into two stages: the first in Arco on the wall of Colodri, and the second in Bardonecchia.
- In 1987, Sportroccia gave way for the first time to Rock Master in Arco, but the event was still held on the rock, not yet on an artificial wall.
- In 1988 began the artificial wall era.
- In 1989 the competition became a stage of the newly formed World Cup of rock climbing.
- In 2005, during the annual events, a conference was held in Bardonecchia, called "1985-2005 Sportroccia twenty years after, the future of sport climbing."

== Editions ==
=== Sportroccia 85 ===
The competition was held from July 5 to 7.

Best Italian (men): Roberto Bassi (7th), Andrea Gallo (8th).

Pos.	Men	Women
1	GER Stefan Glowacz	FRA Catherine Destivelle
2	FRA Jacky Godoffe	ITA Luisa Iovane
3	FRA Thierry Renault	FRA Martine Rolland

=== Sportroccia 86 ===
The competition was held from July 11 to 13. Only Patrick Edlinger finished the final climb, which was named Caduta degli dei, 7c+ ("Damned").

Best Italian: Roberto Bassi (men) (10th) and Rosanna Manfrini (women).

Pos.	Men	Women
1	FRA Patrick Edlinger	FRA Catherine Destivelle
2	GBR Ben Moon	USA Lynn Hill
3	FRA Jacky Godoffe	FRA Isabelle Patissier

=== Sportroccia 88 ===
The competition was held from July 15 to 17.

Pos.	Men	Women
1	FRA Didier Raboutou	FRA Catherine Destivelle
2	FRA Jean-Baptiste Tribout	FRA Isabelle Patissier
3	BEL Arnould T'Kint	ITA Luisa Iovane

=== Sportroccia 89 ===
The competition was held from July 14 to 16. The 1989 edition of Sportroccia also represents the third stage of the Lead Climbing World Cup, 1989.

Best Italian: Nicola Sartori (men) (4th).

Pos.	Men	Women
1	GBR Simon Nadin	FRA Nanette Raybaud
2	GBR Jerry Moffatt	FRA Corinne Labrune
3	FRA Didier Raboutou	ITA Luisa Iovane
