= Katie Brown (climber) =

American rock climber (born 1981)

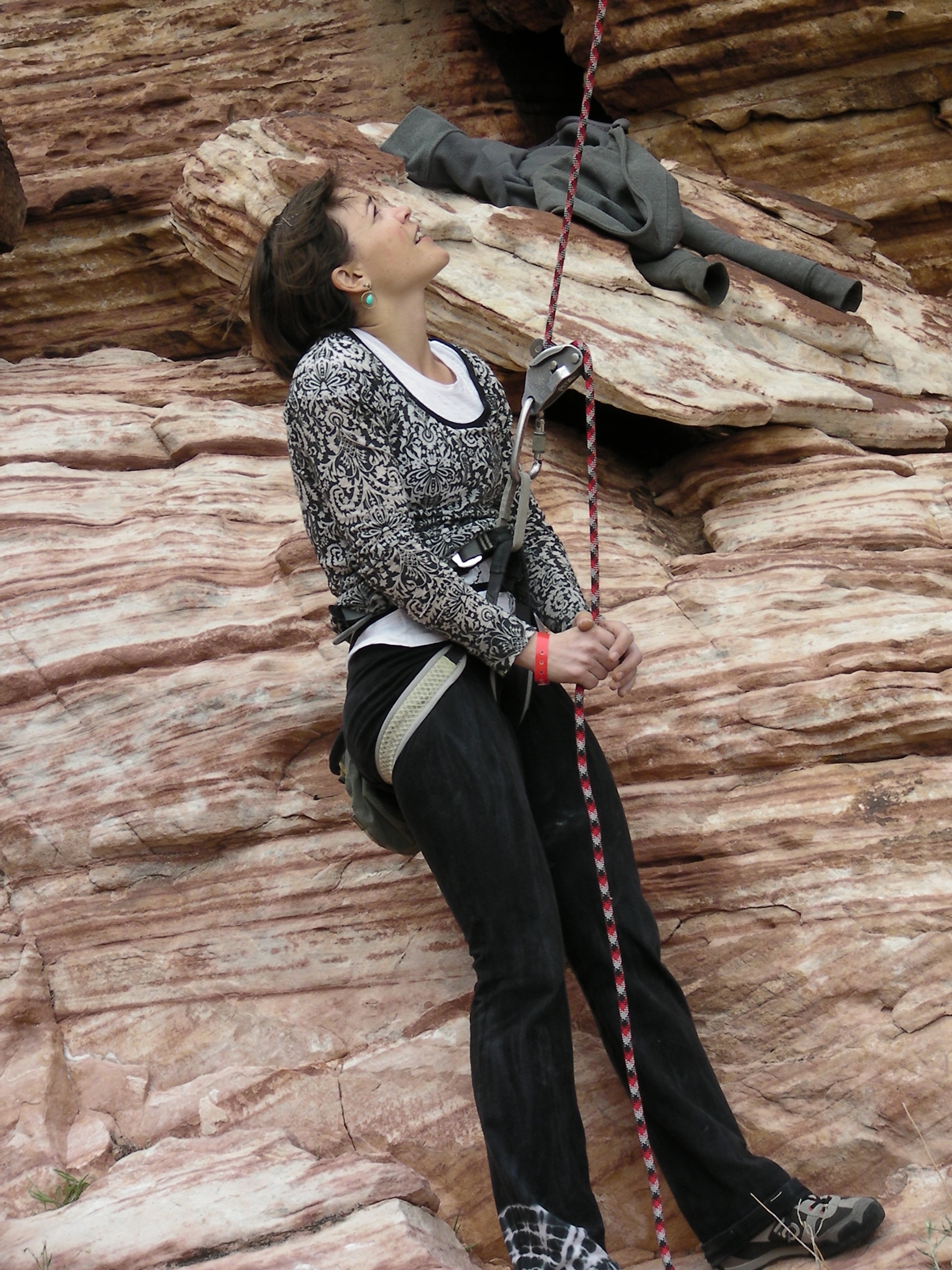
- Brown belaying in Red Rocks, 2009

Personal information
- Born: 1981 (age 44–45)

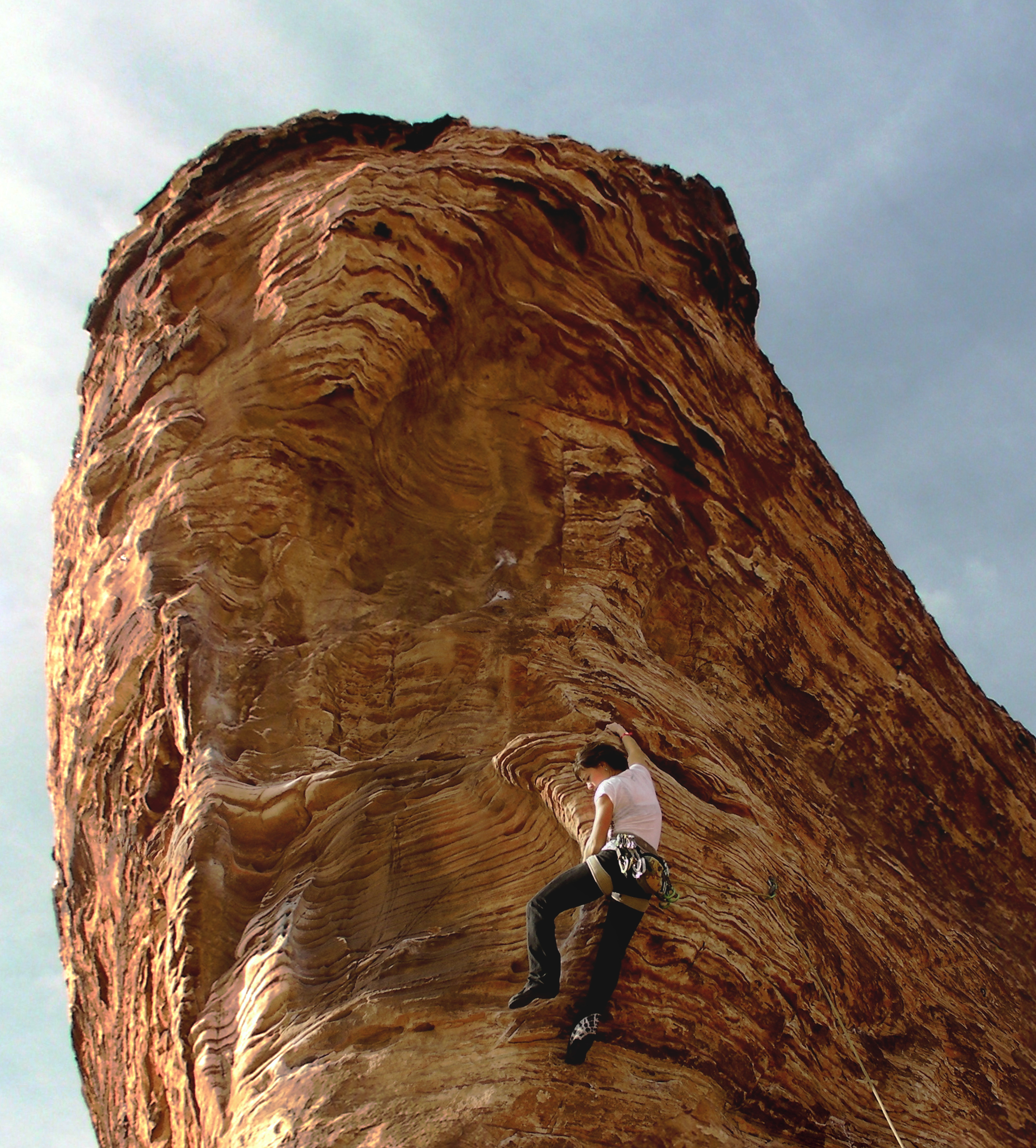
Brown climbing in Red Rocks, 2009

Katie Brown (born 1981) is an American female rock climber and early competition climber, who has also made notable ascents in sport climbing, big wall climbing, and bouldering.

== Biography ==
In 1994, at the age of 13, Brown began sport climbing in Kentucky.

In 1995, at age 14, Brown won the X Games and a climbing Junior World Championship in Laval.

In 1996 and 1997, Brown won both the Rock Master in Arco, Italy and the X Games.

In 1999, Brown clinched a World Cup victory in France.

Later in 1999, Brown decided to leave the competitive sport behind, although she has continued to climb informally. She has been living in the Boulder, Colorado area ever since.

In 2007, Brown started a newspaper column about climbing for the Boulder Daily Camera.

In October 2008, Brown completed an on-sight (i.e., not previously planned) ascent of the northwest face of Yosemite National Park's Half Dome, and afterward, along with climber Lynn Hill, made the first female free ascent of Leaning Tower.

In 2009, Brown was selected as one of the "Hot 20 under 40" by 7x7SF Magazine.

Brown is the author of the book Girl on the Rocks: A Woman's Guide to Climbing with Strength, Grace, and Courage.

Around the same time, Brown was featured in a Citibank ThankYou Card commercial along with Alex Honnold, climbing Fisher Towers near Moab, Utah. She has also appeared in Rolling Stone and The New York Times.

Brown was once described by former world champion Lynn Hill as "the best female climber in the history of the sport."

As of 2020, Brown was working on a memoir.

On October 11, 2022, Brown released the book Unraveled: A Climber’s Journey Through Darkness and Back, detailing her struggles and the fallout of her time as a prodigy, which won the 2023 Boardman Tasker Prize for Mountain Literature.

== See also ==
- Alex Honnold
