= Patrick Berhault =

French mountaineer and rock climber

Personal information
- Born: 19 July 1957 Thiers, Puy-de-Dôme, France
- Died: 28 April 2004 (aged 46) Dom (Mischabel), Switzerland

Climbing career
- Type of climber: Sport climbing; Free solo climbing; Alpine climbing; Ice climbing
- First ascents: Pichenibule (7b+) at Verdon Gorge; La Haine (7c+) at la Loubière/La Turbie Monaco; Le Toit d'Auguste (8b+) at la Loubière/La Turbie Monaco
- Major ascents: La grande traversée des Alpes, 167 days crossing the Alps from East to West (22 summits and major routes), Aug. 2000 to Feb. 2001; Award-winning 16 rock and ice link-up (2003 with Philippe Magnin) in Mont Blanc; 82 days for 82 4000m summits (2004 with Philippe Magnin) in Alps

Patrick Berhault (19 July 1957 – 28 April 2004) was a French professional rock climber and mountaineer, who specialized in sport climbing and alpine climbing. He died climbing the Dom ridge, Switzerland, during his attempt to do an enchainment of all 82 Alpine 4,000-metere summits in 82 days. Berhault is best known for popularizing sport climbing in France with his friend rock climber legend Patrick Edlinger in the late 70s and in the 80s. He also practiced free solo climbing and was one of the pioneer alpinists who developed light and fast mountaineering in the nineties. Berhault died after falling down from a ridge between Dom and Täschhorn in Wallis.

== Documentary films ==
- Voie Express 1979 (Laurent Chevalier)
- Nangat Parbat 1980 (Laurent Chevalier)
- Overdon 1980 (Jean–Paul Janssen)
- OverIce 1981 (Jean–Paul Janssen)
- Oversand 1981 (Jean–Paul Janssen)
- Dévers 1981 (Laurent Chevalier)
- Paroi en coulisse 1983 (Laurent Chevalier)
- Histoire de l’alpinisme 1985 (Bernard Choquet)
- Pirates (Roman Polanski) (stunt)
- La chance de grimper 1987 (Bernard Giani)
- Métamorphoses 1987 (Bruno Soldini)
- Les piliers du rêve 1987 (Guy Meauxsoone) - Meteora ascent, Greece
- Grimpeur Étoile 1989 (Laurent Chevalier)
- Fortune Express 1990 (Olivier Schatzsky) (stunt)
- Les voies de l’équilibre 1992 (Pierre Ostian)
- Premier de Cordée 1998 (Édouard Niermans)
- La Grande Crevasse 1999 (Édouard Niermans)
- La Cordée de rêve 2001 (Gilles Chappaz), produit par Migoo Productions retrace le grand voyage alpin réalisé en 2000-2001.
- Sur le fil des 4000 (Gilles Chappaz), retrace l'enchaînement de 64 des 82 sommets de plus de 4000 des Alpes. Monté à titre posthume par Gilles Chappaz avec notamment des images Mini-DV réalisées par Patrick Berhault et Philippe Magnin au cours de cette aventure. Produit par Migoo Productions.
- Berhault 2008 (Gilles Chappaz & Raphaël Lassablière), produit par Migoo Productions: www.migoo.com

== Books ==
- Encordé mais libre, la traversée des Alpes, Éditions Glénat Livres, Grenoble, octobre 2001, 258 p. (ISBN 2723435822)
- Le Grand Voyage alpin, la traversée des Alpes, Éditions Glénat Livres, Grenoble, novembre 2001, 144 p. (ISBN 272343589X)
- Patrick Berhault (Michel Bricola et Dominique Potard); Éditions Guerin, mai 2008 (ISBN 2352210216)
- Un homme des cimes (Jean-Michel Asselin); Éditions Glénat, mai 2008 (ISBN 9782723452182)
