= Simon Nadin =

British rock climber (born 1965)

Personal information
- Nickname: Buxton stick-man
- Born: 10 July 1965 (age 61) Buxton, England

Climbing career
- Type of climber: Sport climbing, Traditional climbing
- Highest grade: Redpoint: 8a+ (5.13c); Onsight/Flash: 8a+ (5.13c)
- Known for: Winning first IFSC Climbing World Cup in 1989
Medal record
IFSC Climbing World Cup
Winner	1989	Lead
Sport Roccia
Winner	1989	Lead
- Updated on 18 January 2022

Simon Nadin (born 10 July 1965) is a British rock climber and professional photographer, who won the first ever IFSC Climbing World Cup in 1989.

== Climbing ==
Nadin was a climbing all-rounder and pioneered routes which set new levels in climbing. He started climbing on gritstone outcrops, such as The Roaches, near his home in Buxton and using nuts made in his school metalwork lessons.

Within a year of starting climbing he was climbing at E6 level and in later years frequently onsight-soloed E4, E5 or harder routes.

In 1989, having only been a professional climber for six months, he became the first IFSC Climbing World Cup champion, beating Didier Raboutou at the final round in Lyon, with an audience of 8000 people (Jerry Moffatt finished 3rd). He also came first in that round of the World Cup winning £3000 for this. Nadin was nearly disqualified twice for late arrival due to not seeing instructions put up in the official hotel, as the UK team was staying in a youth hostel.

Later in 1989, he unsuccessfully attempted to free climb The Nose on El Capitan with Lynn Hill.

Nadin's training methods were unusual, training 'heavy' in the winter, but still able to complete difficult ascents having not climbed for a period of time.

== Media ==
He appeared in series 3 of Coast climbing The Old Man of Hoy with Neil Oliver and Andy Cave.

== Selected climbs ==
- Barriers in Time - The Roaches
- Thing on a Spring - The Roaches
- Paralogism - The Roaches
- Painted Rumour - The Roaches
- Dangerous Crocodile Snogging - Ramshaw Rocks, Staffordshire
- Never Never Land - Ramshaw, Staffordshire
- Master of Reality - Hen Cloud, Staffordshire
- B4XS - Hen Cloud, Staffordshire
- Inaccessible - Ina's Rock, Churnet Valley
- Menopause - 6b (solo) - Stoney Middleton

== See also ==
- List of grade milestones in rock climbing
- History of rock climbing
- Rankings of most career IFSC gold medals
