= Roman Krajnik =

Slovenian rock climbing coach

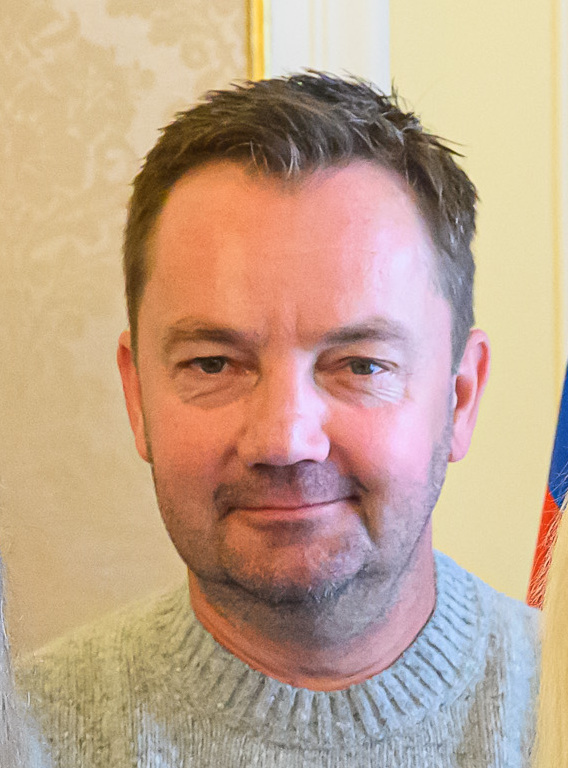
- After the 2024 Paris Olympics

Personal information
- Nationality: Slovenian
- Born: 1975 (age 50–51) Kranj, Slovenia
- Occupation: Rock climbing coach

Climbing career
- Known for: Coaching Olympic climbers

Roman Krajnik (born 1975) is a Slovene rock climbing and competition climbing coach. His trainees include Janja Garnbret,Alberto Gines, Mina Markovič and Maja Vidmar, the former of which won gold medals in climbing at the 2020 and 2024 Summer Olympics.

== Early life ==
Krajnik was born in Kranj in 1975. He began climbing at the age of 18. There was a small bouldering wall in the gym of his high school, and in time, he was competing. But because he had no coach, he was unable to keep up. In 1993 or 1994, together with a group of three or four climbing partners, he decided to learn how to coach climbing.

== Coaching career ==
He devoted himself to coaching in 1996, in the Climbing Club Škofja Loka (Slovene: Plezalni klub Škofja Loka). There, he began coaching children in 1998, and became a professional competition climbing in 2000. His first group of children included Katja and Maja Vidmar. During the 2005 World Cup, when Vidmar won her first cup, he began coaching Mina Markovič.

In 2018, he coached the Austrian national team, including Jakob Schubert and Jessica Pilz.

He began coaching Janja Garnbret at the end of 2019. Garnbret had had an exceptional season, but lost confidence toward the end, coming in 2nd at the lead world cup at Inzai on 27 October. She sought out Krajnik for help. Janja was also injuring herself frequently, which became his first priority. Injury prevention was especially important for bouldering. Then for technique, he assessed her crimp performance well, but noted poor sloper and slab climbing technique, the latter owing partly to the stiffness of her climbing shoes. During the 2025 World Cup, Garnbret decided to compete in fewer competitions in order to spend more time on outdoor sport climbing projects, such as on Bibliographie 9b+ (5.15c); Krajnik found the combination of rock climbing on both natural outdoor surfaces and indoor artificial surfaces ideal. On 26 November 2024, their training for the next Olympic cycle began in Paris.

His other competition climbing trainees include MS paraclimber Gregor Selak, Urban Primožič, Jure Raztresen, Gašper Pintar and Martin Bergant.

== Personal life ==
He lives in Škofja Loka. He is not a morning person, and spends 7 or 8 hours a day in the climbing gym, but does not climb often himself. In 2022, he and Garnbret appeared as celebrity participants of the Slovene version of Who Wants to Be a Millionaire?.

== Bibliography ==
- Luževič, Marjan (2015). "Roman Krajnik, trener športnega plezanja". Muzej športa Škofja Loka (in Slovenian).
- Porenta, Janez (2018-01-19). "Škofjeločan Roman Krajnik na čelu avstrijske plezalne reprezentance". Škofje Loške novice (in Slovenian).
- PD (2018-09-04). "Innsbruck: The first World Cup in the new Olympic format". Lacrux.com.
- C., J. (2022-01-05). "V Milijonarju se obeta še en izjemen dosežek". Planet TV (in Slovenian).
- Garnbret, Janja (2022-03-03). "Climb for Gold - Janja Garnbret, Olympic Champion" (Interview). Interviewed by Berry, Natalie. UKC News.
- "2x olimpijsko zlato, trenerski perfekcionizem in lepota plezanja". YouTube (Interview) (in Slovenian). Interviewed by Habjan, Miha. Planinska zveza Slovenije. 2024a.
- Šemrov, Uroš (2024-07-28). "Roman Krajnik, trener Janje Garnbret: Boljša v vseh plezalnih prvinah". Dnevnik (in Slovenian). eISSN 1581-3037. Interview.
- Garnbret, Janja (2024-09-05). "Why Janja Garnbret Says Her Coach Makes Winning "Even Remotely Possible"" (Interview). Interviewed by Burgman, John. Climbing.
- "Po Parizu sem začutil, da potrebujem premor" (Interview) (in Slovenian). Interviewed by Teran Košir, Alenka. S.Sportal. 2024b.
- "Roman Krajnik". YouTube (Interview) (in Slovenian). Interviewed by Radio Sora. Na stežaj: radijska klepetalnica. 2025a.
- "Biti trener Janje Garnbret je velika odgovornost". YouTube (Interview) (in Slovenian). Interviewed by RTV SLO. 2025b.
- A. P. J. (2025-08-21). "Roman Krajnik: Janja potrebuje izzive, težave bi lahko imela le s kožo". RTV SLO (in Slovenian). Interview.
- Digital ROCK (n.d.). "Roman Krajnik". Digital Rock.
