= Mina Markovič =

Slovenian rock climber (born 1987)

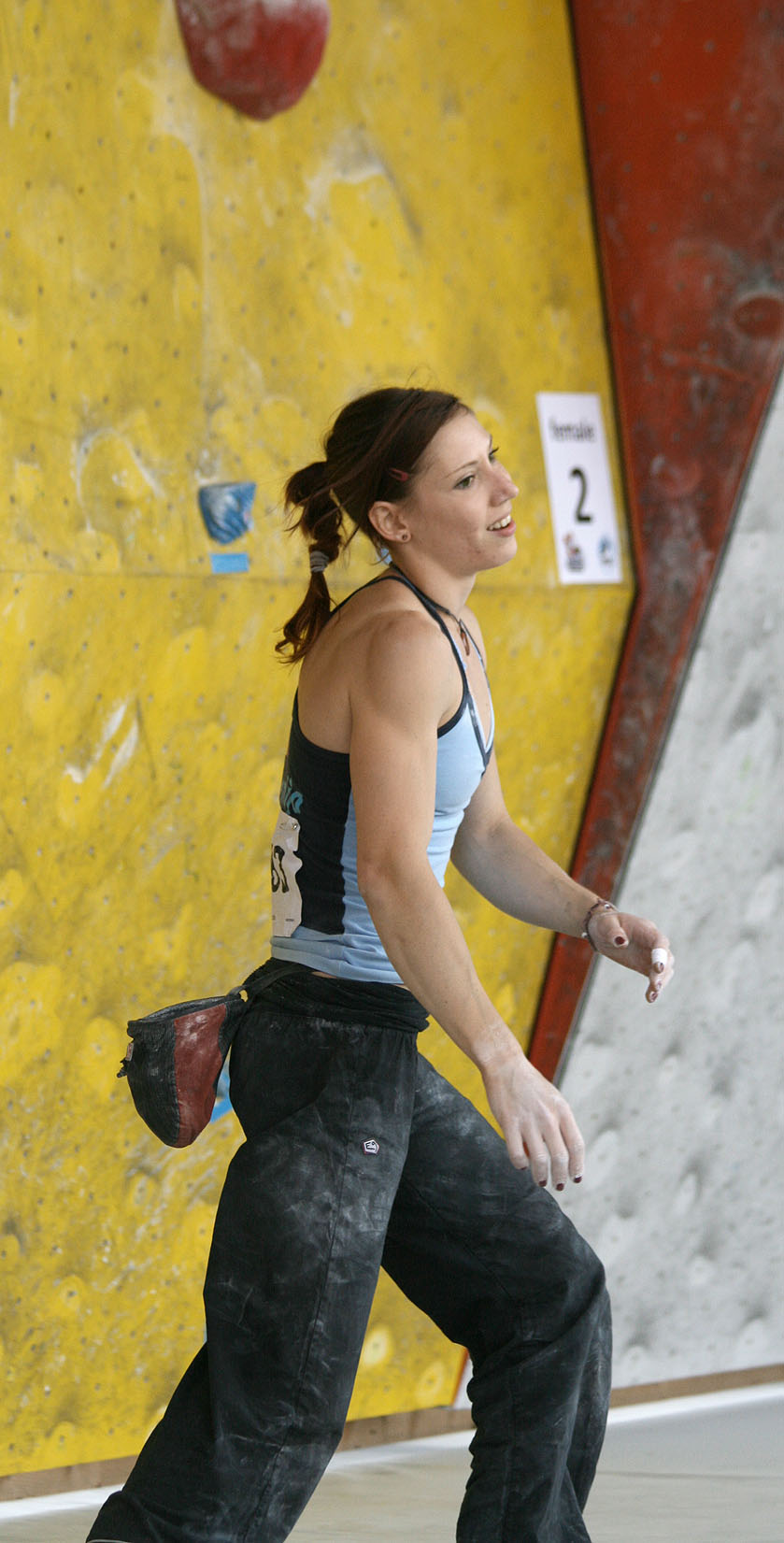
- Markovič at the Bouldering World Cup in Vienna, 2010

Personal information
- Nationality: Slovenian
- Occupations: Professional rock climber, climbing coach, speaker
- Height: 161 cm (5 ft 3 in)
- Website: www.mina-markovic.com

Climbing career
- Type of climber: Competition climbing; Sport climbing; Bouldering; Speed climbing
- Highest grade: Redpoint: 9a (Fabela Pa La Enmienda) (2015), 9a Halupca 1979 (2021), 9a Waterworld (2021); Onsight/Flash: 8b+ (5.14a)
Medal record
Women's competition climbing
Representing Slovenia
World Games
Gold medal – first place	2013	Lead
World Championships
Silver medal – second place	2014 Gijón	Lead
Bronze medal – third place	2014 Munich/Gijón	Combined
Bronze medal – third place	2016 Paris	Lead
World Cup
Third place	2008	Lead
Second place	2010	Lead
Winner	2011	Lead
Winner	2011	Combined
Winner	2012	Lead
Winner	2012	Combined
Second place	2013	Lead
Winner	2013	Combined
Second place	2014	Lead
Second place	2014	Combined
Winner	2015	Lead
World Youth Championships
Gold medal – first place	2005	Juniors Lead
European Championships
Bronze medal – third place	2008	Lead
Silver medal – second place	2013	Lead
Silver medal – second place	2013	Bouldering
Gold medal – first place	2015	Lead
Silver medal – second place	2017	Lead
Winter Military World Games
Bronze medal – third place	2017	Lead
Bronze medal – third place	2017	Bouldering
Rock Master
Winner	2013	Lead
- Updated on November 13, 2017

Mina Markovič is a professional rock climber who specialized in competition climbing, from which she is now retired. She competed in the World Cup and World Championships in competition lead climbing, competition bouldering, and competition speed climbing, obtaining her best results in lead. She also climbs on outdoor sport climbing routes where she has redpointed to 9a (5.14d).

== Biography ==
Markovič began competing in 2001 and participated in the European Youth Cup in competition lead climbing as well as the World Youth Championships in Imst where she placed 5th in lead and 22nd in competition speed climbing.

In 2004, under coach Roman Krajnik, Markovič started competing in the adult category at the Climbing World Cup in lead climbing. In 2006, she won a silver and a bronze medal in two stages of that competition. In addition to adult competitions, she continued to participate in the Lead Climbing European Youth Cup, which she won in 2005.

In September 2009, at the Rock Master in Arco, she finished 2nd behind Angela Eiter.

In 2009, 2011, and 2014, she competed at the IFSC World Championships in three disciplines: lead, bouldering, and speed. From 2009 to 2014, she participated in most of the stages of the IFSC World Cup in lead and bouldering, where she obtained the combined title in 2011, 2012, and 2013, due to high rankings in both disciplines.

In 2011, she won her first lead climbing World Cup over Jain Kim and Maja Vidmar, by finishing third in Puurs, second at Briançon and Boulder and first in Chamonix, Xining, Changzhi, Amman, and Barcelona.

In 2012, she won her second lead climbing World Cup (with three victories, and four second places)

In 2015, she earned both the lead climbing gold medal at the IFSC World Cup and the European Championships.

== Rankings ==
=== Climbing World Championships ===
Youth

Discipline	2001 Youth B	2002 Youth B	2003 Youth A	2004 Youth A	2005 Juniors	2006 Juniors
Lead	5	28	13	10	1	5
Speed	22	11	-	-	.	.

Adult

Discipline	2005	2007	2009	2011	2012	2014	2016
Lead	26	19	18	6	-	2	3
Bouldering	-	-	4	12	-	9	-
Speed	-	-	33	50	-	34	-
Combined	-	-	-	-	-	3	-

=== Climbing World Cup ===
Discipline	2004	2005	2006	2007	2008	2009	2010	2011	2012	2013	2014	2015	2016	2017
Lead	30	21	6	6	3	5	2	1	1	2	2	1	5	6
Bouldering	-	-	-	-	-	14	11	5	4	10	16	-	-	-
Speed	-	-	-	-	-	-	-	-	-	-	-	-	-	-
Combined	-	-	-	-	-	5	4	1	1	1	2	-	-	13

=== Climbing European Championships ===
Discipline	2004	2006	2008	2010	2013	2015	2017
Lead	22	10	3	4	2	1	2
Bouldering	-	-	-	7	2	6	-
Speed	-	-	-	22	34	32	41

== Number of medals in the Climbing European Youth Cup ==
=== Lead ===
Season	Category	Gold	Silver	Bronze	Total
2004	Youth A			1	1
2005	Juniors	3	1		4
2006	Juniors			1	1
Total		3	1	2	6

== Number of medals in the Climbing World Cup ==
=== Lead ===
Season	Gold	Silver	Bronze	Total
2006		1	1	2
2007		1		1
2008	1	1	1	3
2009	1		1	2
2010		2		2
2011	5	3	1	9
2012	3	4		7
2013	3	3	1	7
2014	3	1	1	5
2015	4	1		5
2016		1		1
2017		1		1
Total	20	19	6	45

=== Bouldering ===
Season	Gold	Silver	Bronze	Total
2011	1			1
2012	1	1		2
Total	2	1	0	3

== Awards ==
- 2015 Arco Rock Legends - LaSportiva comp award
- 2013 Salewa Rock Award
- Bloudkova nagrada - highest recognition of Slovenia for Sport achievements
- Bloudkova plaketa - Slovenian recognition for sport achievements
