= Stefan Glowacz =

German rock climber and mountaineer

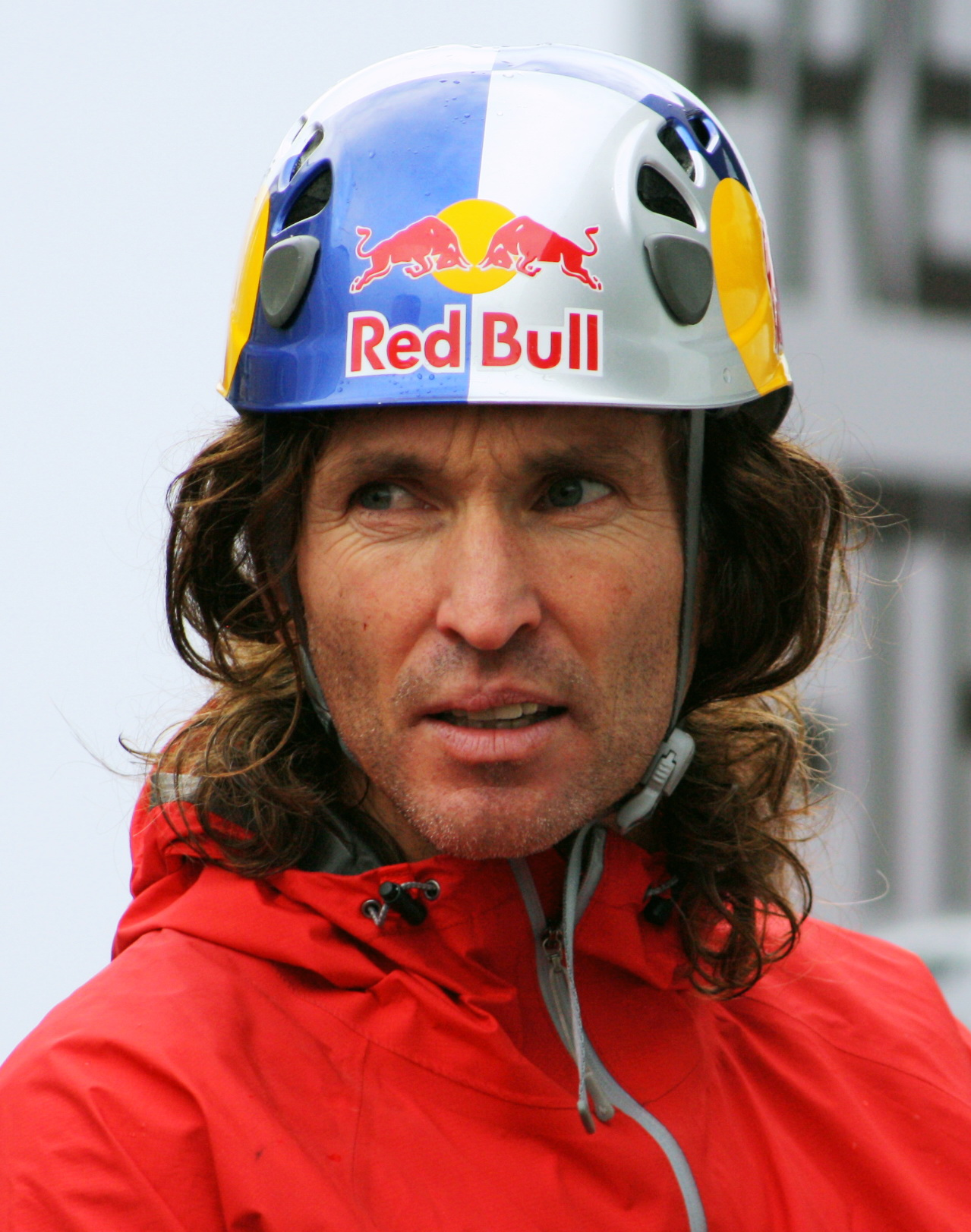

Personal information
- Nationality: German
- Born: March 22, 1965 (age 61) Tittmoning, Bavaria, West Germany

Climbing career
- Type of climber: Competition climbing; Sport climbing; Multi-pitch climbing; Alpine climbing
- Highest grade: Redpoint: 8c (5.14b)
- Retired from competition: 1993
Medal record
Sport Roccia
Gold medal – first place	1985	Lead
Rock Master
Gold medal – first place	1987	Lead
Gold medal – first place	1988	Lead
Gold medal – first place	1992	Lead
IFSC World Championships
Silver medal – second place	1993 Innsbruck	Lead
- Updated on 1 April 2013

Stefan Glowacz (born March 22, 1965, in Tittmoning) is a German professional rock climber and adventurer. He started climbing at the age of 12 and advanced to one of the world's strongest competition climbers and sport climber a few years later. Since 1993 he has been devoted to natural challenges such as expeditions to remote places in Canada, Patagonia and Antarctica.

== Competition climbing ==
- 1985 Sportroccia
- 1987, 1988, 1992 Rock Master
- Winner of the Olympic Games' demonstration challenge in Albertville
- 1993 Vice World Champion

== Notable ascents ==
- In 1994, Glowacz freed Des Kaisers neue Kleider (translated: The Emperor's new Clothes) in the Kaiser Mountains at (X+/8b+/5.14a), one of the hardest-ever big wall climbing routes in world.
- First ascents of big walls at the Una Peaks (Cape Renard Towers) in Antarctica; Tupilak and Ulamartorsuaq, respectively in Eastern and Southern Greenland; and Mount Harrison Smith in Canada
- In 2001, Glowacz became the first-ever person to complete the "Alpine Trilogy" of the hardest multi-pitch big wall climbing routes of the Alps (all established in 1994), including Thomas Huber's "End of Silence" (X/8b/5.13d) near Berchtesgaden and Beat Kammerlander's "Silbergeier" ("Silver Vulture") (X/8b/5.13d) in the Rätikon
- In 2006, he was nominated for the Piolet d'Or' for a 27-pitch route (IX+/7c+/5.13a, A2, M4) up the north wall of the Cerro Murallón in Patagonia.

== Books, Films ==
- Jäger des Augenblicks
- Richtig Freiklettern
- Rocks around the World
- Hoch hinaus
- Titlis – Chronik einer Erstbegehung, DVD
- The Race, DVD
- On the Rocks - Leben an den Fingerspitzen (2005, Piper)
- Cerro Torre: Scream of the Stone (1991, directed by Werner Herzog), DVD
- Roraima: Climbers of the Lost World (2013, Red Bull)

== See also ==
- History of rock climbing
- List of first ascents (sport climbing)
