= Michael Piccolruaz =

Italian professional rock climber (born 1995)

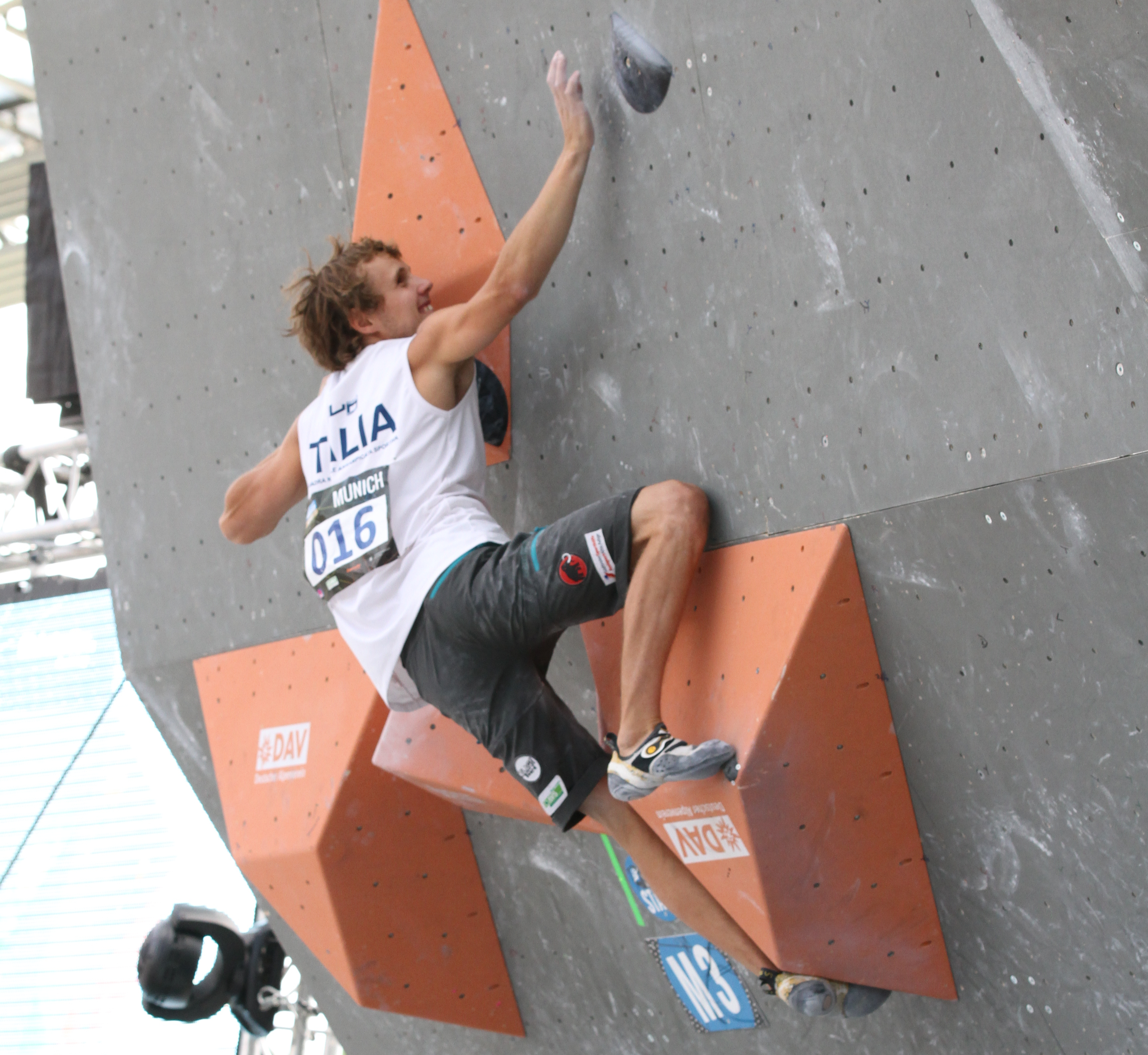

Personal information
- Nationality: Italian
- Born: 31 December 1995 (age 30) Bolzano, Italy
- Occupation: Professional rock climber

Climbing career
- Type of climber: Competition climbing; Bouldering

Michael Piccolruaz (born 31 December 1995) is an Italian professional rock climber who specializes in competition climbing. He competed at the 2020 Summer Olympics.

== Competition climbing career ==
At the 2016 World Cup, he finished second.

At the 2017 IFSC Climbing European Championships, he finished third in the overall combined competition.

He qualified for the 2020 Summer Olympics after the IFSC reallocated spots that were unused due to canceled competitions.
