= Jernej Kruder =

Slovenian rock climber

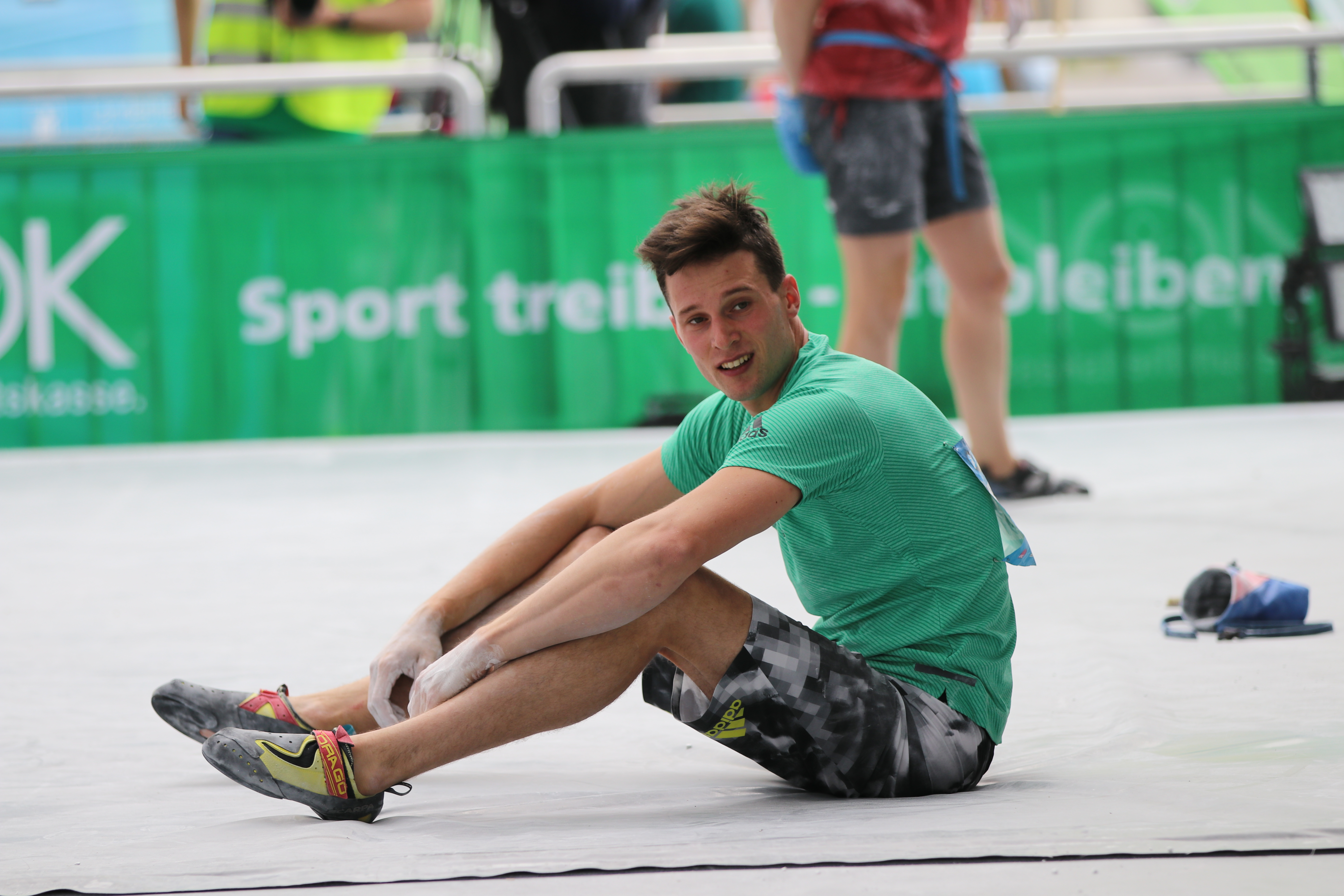
- Kruder at the Bouldering World Cup in Munich, 2017

Personal information
- Nationality: Slovenian
- Born: December 5, 1990 (age 35) Celje, Slovenia
- Occupation: Professional rock climber
- Height: 180 cm (5 ft 11 in)
- Weight: 71 kg (157 lb)
- Website: krudrozaver.blogspot.com

Climbing career
- Type of climber: Competition climbing; Bouldering; Sport climbing; Deep-water soloing
- Highest grade: Redpoint: 9a+ (5.15a); Bouldering: 8C (V15)
- Known for: Winning Bouldering World Cup in 2018
Medal record
Men's competition climbing
Representing Slovenia
World Championships
Silver medal – second place	2014 Munich	Bouldering
World Cup
Winner	2018	Bouldering
European Youth Cup
Winner	2006	Speed
- Updated on April 14, 2019

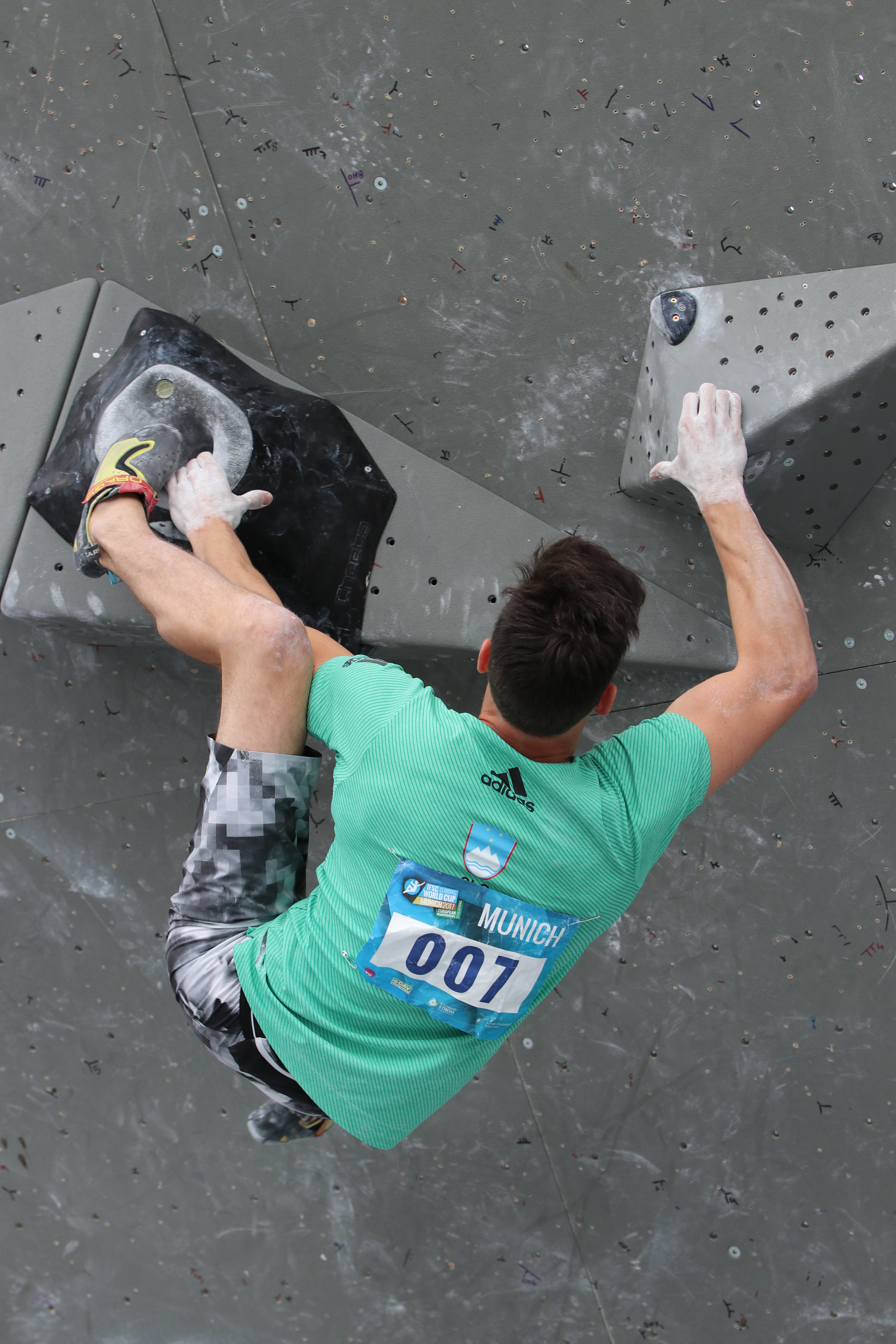
Jernej Kruder at the Bouldering World Cup in Munich, 2017

Jernej Kruder (born December 5, 1990) is a Slovenian rock climber who specializes in competition climbing, bouldering and sport climbing. In 2018, he won the IFSC Climbing World Cup in competition bouldering.

== Climbing career ==
In 2016 Jernej completed the 9a+ (5.15a) graded deep-water soloing route Es Pontàs in Mallorca. The route was originally established by Chris Sharma in 2006. Jernej was only the second climber to repeat it. It took him 16 days and 39 attempts to finish the route. Jernej initially graded the route 9b (5.15b). Jan Hojer, who got the third ascend on the route, downgraded it to 9a+.

In September 2018, he managed to get the first ascent on the boulder, Metafizika, near Celje, Slovenia. It has a bouldering grade of 8C (V15), and was only the second boulder of that difficulty in Slovenia.

On 31 December 2018, Jernej made the first ascent of Dugi rat at the crag Vrulja close to Omiš in Croatia. With a grade of 9a+ (5.15a) it is the hardest sport climbing route in the country. Jernej bolted the route himself and had been working on it for 4 years. The name Dugi rat means "long cape/horn" in Croatian.

== Rankings ==
=== Climbing World Cup ===
Discipline	2008	2009	2010	2011	2012	2013	2014	2015	2016	2017	2018
Lead		65								55	
Bouldering	64	33	15	21	10	11	8	21	10	9	1
Speed											
Combined		17								24	

=== Climbing World Championships ===
Youth

Discipline	2004 Youth B	2005 Youth B	2006 Youth A	2007 Youth A	2008 Juniors	2009 Juniors
Lead	26	32	50		19	19
Bouldering						
Speed		2	4		14	13

Adult

Discipline	2009	2011	2012	2014	2016
Lead					
Bouldering	27	25	31	2	11
Speed	37				
Combined					

=== Rock Master ===
Discipline	2010	2011	2012	2013	2014	2015	2016	2017	2018
Lead	38								
Duel									
KO Boulder	16				1		5	7	3

== Number of medals in the Climbing World Cup ==
=== Bouldering ===
Season	Gold	Silver	Bronze	Total
2017			1	1
2018	1	3		4
2019	1			1
Total	2	3	1	6
