= Maja Vidmar (climber) =

Slovenian rock climber

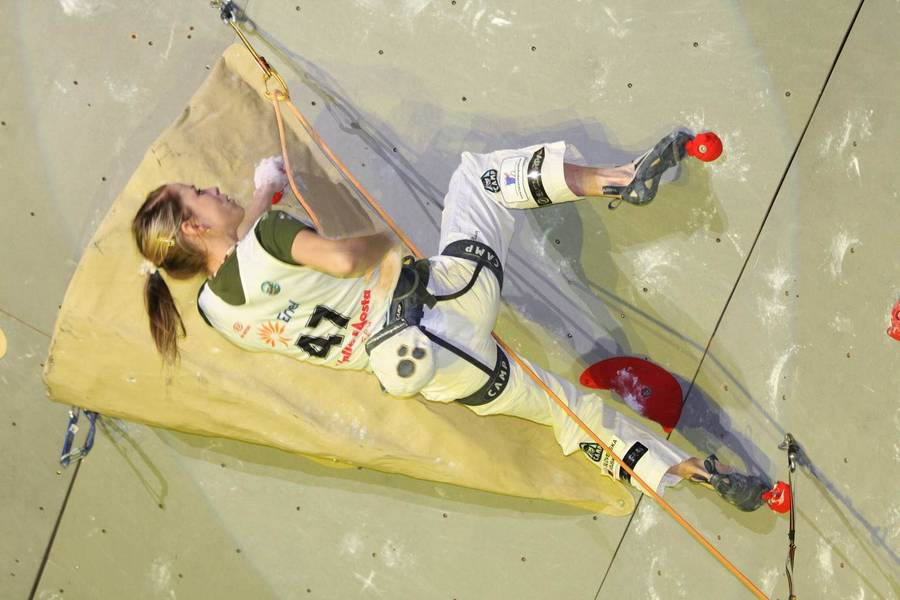
- Vidmar at the 2010 Winter Military World Games

Personal information
- Nationality: Slovenian
- Born: December 30, 1985 (age 40) Kranj, Slovenia
- Occupation: Professional rock climber
- Height: 162 cm (5 ft 4 in)
- Weight: 47 kg (104 lb)

Climbing career
- Type of climber: Competition lead climbing; Sport climbing
- Highest grade: Redpoint: 8c+ (5.14c); Onsight/Flash: 8b+ (5.14a)
- Retired from competition: 2014
- Known for: World Champion in Lead climbing
- Updated on August 13, 2019

Maja Vidmar (born December 30, 1985) is a Slovenian rock climber who specializes in competition lead climbing and sport climbing, and is known for winning the 2007 Lead Climbing World Championship. She started competing in 2000, at the age of 15, and retired from international competitions at the age of 29, after participating in the 2014 Lead Climbing World Championship and 2014 Lead Climbing World Cup. She was the second-ever woman in history to onsight an 8b+ (5.14a) route.

== Career ==
Vidmar started climbing at the age of 12 years, in 1997 in a climbing gym, coached by Roman Krajnik. Next year, she started competing in national competition lead climbing events. In 2000, at the age of 15, she won the European Youth Cup in Lead climbing.

Her most relevant competitive achievements were obtained between 2005 and 2011, as shown below. In 2008, she also received the La Sportiva Competition Award.

She retired from international competitions at the age of 29, after participating in the 2014 Lead Climbing World Championship and 2014 Lead Climbing World Cup.

== Rankings ==
=== Climbing World Cup ===
Discipline	2002	2003	2004	2005	2006	2007	2008	2009	2010	2011	2012	2013	2014
Lead	9	12	8	2	4	1	2	3	7	3	11	16	7

=== Climbing World Championships ===
Discipline	2003	2005	2007	2009	2011	2012	2014
Lead	17	11	3	3	11	17	5

== Number of medals in the Climbing World Cup ==
=== Lead ===
Season	Gold	Silver	Bronze	Total
2002		1		1
2003			1	1
2004			2	2
2005	1	2	3	6
2006	1	1	2	4
2007	6			6
2008	2	1	1	4
2009	1	1	1	3
2010			1	1
2011	1	1	1	3
2012			3	3
2014			1	1
Total	12	7	16	35

== Rock climbing ==
=== Redpointed ===
8c+/5.14c:

- Attila Lunga – Baratro (ITA) – June 18, 2009

8c/5.14b:

- Strelovod – Mišja Peč (SLO) – March 27, 2009
- Sikario Sanguinario – Baratro (ITA) – September 12, 2007
- La peste nera – Baratro (ITA) – September 12, 2007
- Osapski pajek – Osp (SLO) – May 8, 2006

=== Onsighted ===
8b+/5.14a:

- Humildes pa casa – Oliana (ESP) – April 2010. Second-ever woman in history to onsight and 8b+ route.

8b/5.13d:

- Spartan wall – Kalymnos (GRE) – May 26, 2009
