= Climbing French Championships =

Competition climbing event

Climbing French Championships are annual national championships for competition climbing organised by the French Federation of Mountaineering and Climbing (French: Fédération Française de la Montagne et de l'Escalade, FFME). The first championships was held in 1988 with only lead events.

== Lead ==
Edition	Year	Location	Men	Women
1	1988	Avignon	Jacky Godoffe	Isabelle Patissier
2	1989	Laval	Alexandre Duboc	Marie-Agnès Duval
3	1990	Béziers	Didier Raboutou	Nanette Raybaud
4	1991	Briançon	François Petit	Isabelle Patissier
5	1992	Aix-les-Bains	François Legrand	Isabelle Patissier
6	1993	Toulouse	François Legrand	Nanette Raybaud
7	1994	Tours	Arnaud Petit	Liv Sansoz
8	1995	Besançon	Arnaud Petit	Laurence Guyon; Nathalie Richer
9	1996	Pantin	François Petit	Cécile Avezou
10	1997	Aix-en-Provence	François Petit	Stéphanie Bodet
11	1998	Canteleu	David Caude	Cécile Avezou
12	1999	Grabels	Alexandre Chabot	Liv Sansoz
13	2000	Saint-Michel-de-Maurienne	David Caude	Delphine Martin
14	2001	Albertville	Alexandre Chabot	Stéphanie Bodet; Sandrine Levet
15	2002	Valence	Alexandre Chabot	Sandrine Levet
16	2003	Albertville	Alexandre Chabot	Sandrine Levet
17	2004	Massy	Alexandre Chabot	Caroline Ciavaldini
18	2005	Albertville	Alexandre Chabot	Caroline Ciavaldini
19	2006	Chamonix	Alexandre Chabot	Caroline Ciavaldini
20	2007	Échirolles	Michaël Fuselier	Caroline Ciavaldini
21	2008	Pau	Fabien Dugit	Charlotte Durif
22	2009	Gémozac	Michaël Fuselier	Florence Pinet
23	2010	Voiron	Manuel Romain	Charlotte Durif
24	2011	Massy	Gautier Supper	Charlotte Durif
25	2012	Arnas	Romain Desgranges	Charlotte Durif
26	2013	Niort	Romain Desgranges	Charlotte Durif
27	2014	Niort	Romain Desgranges	Hélène Janicot
28	2015	Gémozac	Romain Desgranges	Charlotte Durif
29	2016	Pau	Gautier Supper	Mathilde Becerra
30	2017	Valence	Manuel Romain	Nolwenn Arc
31	2018	Arnas	Romain Desgranges	Julia Chanourdie
32	2019	Le Pouzin	Manuel Cornu	Hélène Janicot

== Bouldering ==
Edition	Year	Location	Men	Women
I	1998	Argentière la Bessée	Daniel Du Lac	Liv Sansoz
II	1999	Clamecy	Anthony Lamiche	Marie Laure Beghin
III	2000	Clamecy	Jérôme Meyer	Sandrine Levet
IV	2001	Clamecy	Alexandre Chabot	Myriam Motteau
V	2002	Saint-Jean-de-Maurienne	Jérôme Meyer	Sandrine Levet
VI	2003	Firminy	Jérôme Meyer	Sandrine Levet
VII	2004	Apt	Daniel Du Lac	Sandrine Levet
VIII	2005	Grenoble	Stéphane Julien	Sandrine Levet
IX	2006	Plouha	Loic Gaidioz	Emilie Abgral
X	2007	Apt	Fabien Dugit	Florence Pinet
XI	2008	Fontainebleau	Jérôme Meyer	Juliette Danion
XII	2009	Le Pouzin	François Kaiser	Florence Pinet
XIII	2010	Bron	François Kaiser	Mélissa Le Nevé
XIV	2011	Millau	François Kaiser	Anne-Laure Chevrier
XV	2012	Millau	Guillaume Glairon Mondet	Mélanie Sandoz
XVI	2013	Chambéry	Thomas Caleyron	Mélissa Le Nevé
XVII	2014	Nozay	Jérémy Bonder	Marine Thévenet
XVIII	2015	La Baconnière	Jérémy Bonder	Fanny Gibert
XIX	2016	Toulouse	Pascal Gagneux	Clémentine Kaiser
XX	2017	La Baconnière	Alban Levier	Fanny Gibert
XXI	2018	Massy	Manuel Cornu	Fanny Gibert
XXII	2019	La Baconnière	Jérémy Bonder	Fanny Gibert
XXIII	2020	La Baconnière	Manuel Cornu	Fanny Gibert
XXIV	2022	Massy	Paul Jenft	Fanny Gibert

== Speed ==
Edition	Year	Location	Men	Women
	2004	Valence	Nicolas Januel	Anne-Laure Chevrier
	2005	Valence	Sylvain Chapelle	Elodie Giroux
	2008	Valence	Nicolas Januel	Mathilde Couchot
	2009	Échirolles	Sylvain Chapelle	Morgane Aveline
	2010	Voiron	Gautier Supper	Morgane Aveline
	2011	Massy	Mickaël Mawem	Margot Heitz
	2012	Arnas	Yoann Le Couster	Esther Bruckner
	2013	Niort	Bassa Mawem	Esther Bruckner
	2014	Massy	Yoann Le Couster	Anouck Jaubert
	2015	Voiron	Bassa Mawem	Anouck Jaubert
	2016	Voiron	Bassa Mawem	Anouck Jaubert
	2017	Saint-Étienne	Guillaume Moro	Anouck Jaubert
	2018	Saint-Étienne	Bassa Mawem	Victoire Andrier
	2019	Massy	Bassa Mawem	Aurélia Sarisson
	2022	Massy	Bassa Mawem	Aurélia Sarisson

== Combined ==
Edition	Year	Location	Men	Women
I	2014	Nozay – Massy – Niort	Benoît Heintz	Charlotte Durif
II	2015	La Baconnière – Voiron – Gémozac	Manuel Cornu	Charlotte Durif
III	2016	Toulouse – Voiron – Pau	Clément Vernaison	Mathilde Becerra
IV	2017	Valence – La Baconnière -	Maël Bonzom	Julia Chanourdie
V	2018	Arnas – Massy -	Sam Avezou	Julia Chanourdie
VI	2019	Arnas – Massy -	Manuel Cornu	Hélène Janicot
