= Arnas, Rhône =

Arnas
- Commune
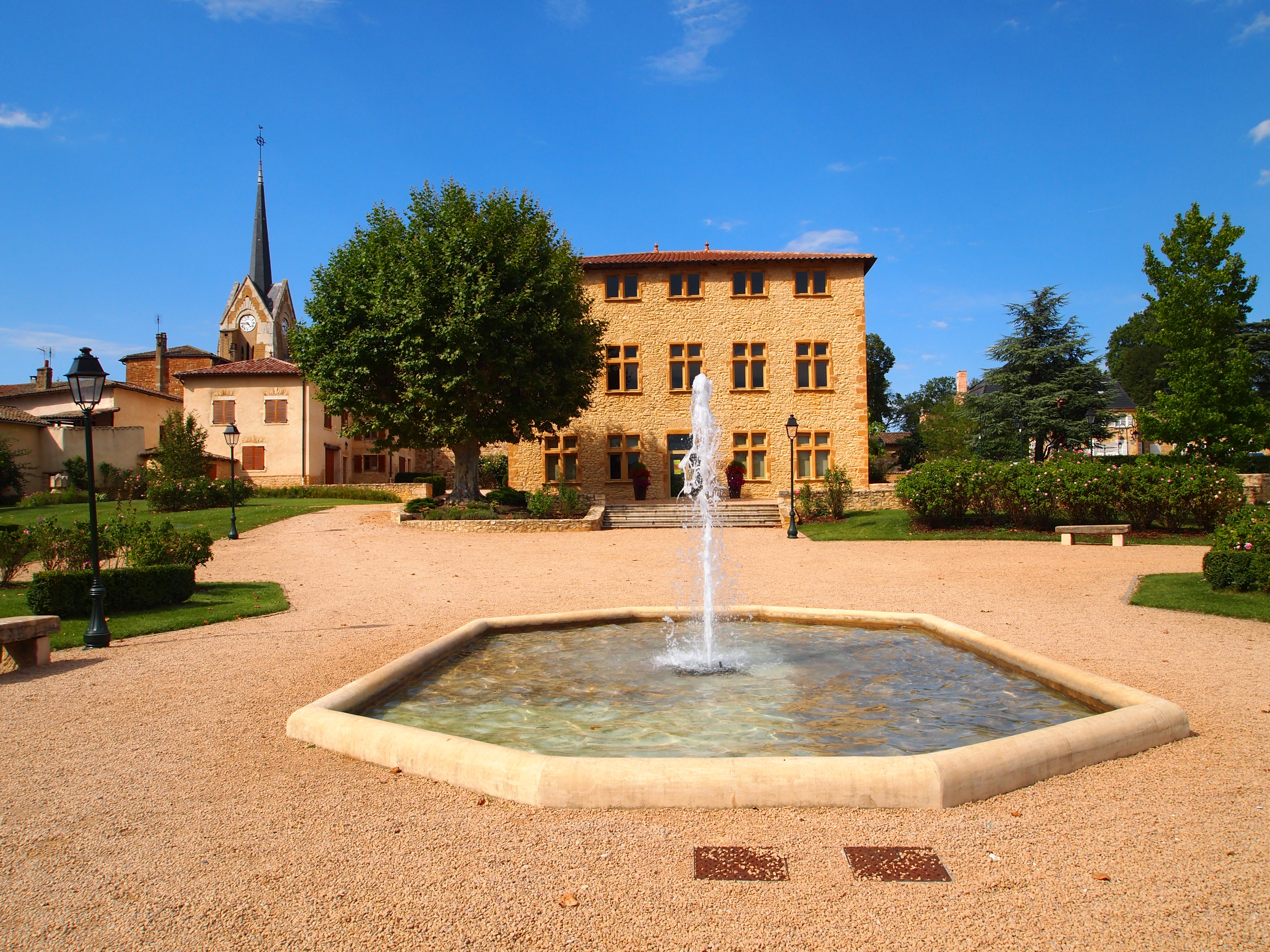
- The town hall in Arnas
- Location of Arnas
- Location within France Location within Auvergne-Rhône-Alpes
- Coordinates: 46°01′28″N 4°42′33″E
- Country: France
- Region: Auvergne-Rhône-Alpes
- Department: Rhône
- Arrondissement: Villefranche-sur-Saône
- Canton: Gleizé
- Intercommunality: CA Villefranche Beaujolais Saône

Government
  - Mayor (2020–2026): Michel Romanet-Chancrin
- Area^{1}: 17.52 km^{2} (6.76 sq mi)
- Elevation: 190 m (620 ft)
- Highest elevation: 264 m (866 ft)
- Lowest elevation: 167 m (548 ft)
- Population (2023): 4,601
  - Density: 262.6/km^{2} (680.2/sq mi)
- Time zone: UTC+01:00 (CET)
  - Summer (DST): UTC+02:00 (CEST)
- INSEE/Postal code: 69013 /69400
- ^{1} French Land Register data, which excludes lakes, ponds, glaciers > 1 km^{2} (0.386 sq mi or 247 acres) and river estuaries.

Arnas (French pronunciation: [aʁnas]) is a commune of the Rhône department, eastern France.

== Neighboring municipalities ==
- Villefranche-sur-Saône
- Gleizé
- Denicé
- Saint-Julien
- Saint-Georges-de-Reneins
- Fareins

== Population ==
Historical population

Year	Pop.	±% p.a.
1793	498	—
1821	648	+0.94%
1846	775	+0.72%
1872	984	+0.92%
1901	1,031	+0.16%
1926	965	−0.26%
1946	1,112	+0.71%
1962	1,349	+1.21%
1968	1,547	+2.31%

Year	Pop.	±% p.a.
1975	2,116	+4.58%
1982	2,336	+1.42%
1990	2,783	+2.21%
1999	3,106	+1.23%
2007	3,212	+0.42%
2012	3,409	+1.20%
2017	3,778	+2.08%
2023	4,601	+3.34%

Source: EHESS and INSEE (1968–2023)

== See also ==
Communes of the Rhône department
