= Georges Dufrénoy =

French painter (1870–1943)

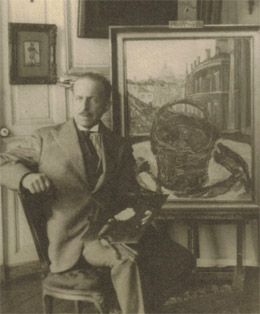
- Born: Georges Dufrénoy; June 20, 1870; Thiais, Île-de-France, France
- Died: December 9, 1943 (aged 73); Salles-en-Beaujolais, Rhône, France
- Known for: Painting

Georges Dufrénoy (French pronunciation: [ʒɔʁʒ dyfʁenwa]; June 20, 1870 – December 9, 1943) was a French post-Impressionist painter associated with Fauvism.

== Biography ==
He was born in Thiais, France. His family lived at 2 Place des Vosges in Paris in a historic 17th-century building in which he lived all his life. Dufrénoy went to school at the Oratoriens Catholic school (école Massillon, 2 quai des Célestins, Paris 4ème) from age 5 to 17. At 17, after some hesitation between the study of architecture and painting, Dufrénoy chose to become a painter.

Dufrénoy studied with Jean-Paul Laurens at the Académie Julian from 1887. In 1890 he began a period of two years as the only pupil of Désiré Laugier, from whom he learned a great deal. His early works which he started showing in 1895 were very much influenced by Impressionism.

In 1902 he made his first trip to Venice, a place he fell in love with and would return to almost every year until 1939, except during World War I. He discovered the great Venetian masters Titian, Tintoretto and Veronese. Art critic Marius-Ary Leblond wrote that his Venice works "follow in the great tradition of the Venetian Masters, he puts himself in the direct line of succession to the Italians; he remains an opulent and aristocratic Venetian in his works."

He started participating in major shows, among them the Salon International de Reims in 1903 (with three canvases); and in 1904 the Salon des Indépendants. He became a member of the Salon d'Automne, of which he would later become a committee member and a board member and to which he remained faithful until his last years. Bernheim-Jeune (an important Paris art dealer) bought his "Rue à l'omnibus" at the Salon des Indépendants.

In 1905 he traveled to Italy to paint with his friend Pierre Girieud. In 1907 Marius-Ary Leblond published a very positive review of Dufrénoy's work, and ranked him among the best in his generation.

His gallerist from then on was Druet, who also supported artists such as Bonnard, Derain, Friesz, Marquet, and Vuillard. After Druet closed in 1934 his main gallerist was Katia Granoff.

On 29 January 1914 he married Marguerite de Baroncelli-Javon. She was the sister of Marquis Folco de Baroncelli-Javon and of the filmmaker Jacques de Baroncelli. Folco was a well known "manadier" who raised bulls for bullfights on his estate in Camargue and befriended Buffalo Bill. Along with Marguerite, who was queen of the Félibrige from 1906 to 1913, Folco was a friend of provençal poets Mistral and Joseph d'Arbaud. Georges and Marguerite had two daughters and two sons.

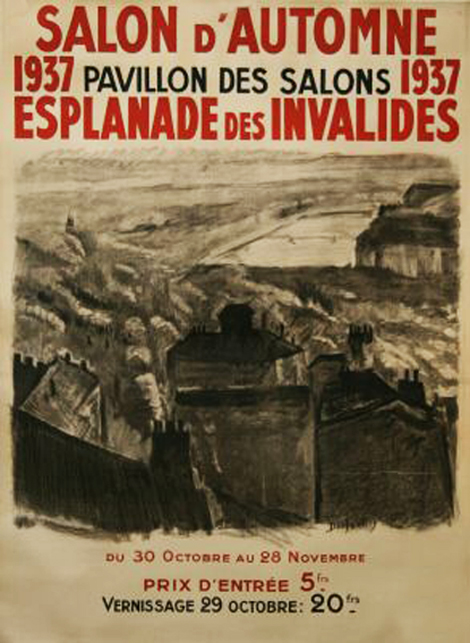
Vue de Lyon by Georges Dufrénoy: poster advertising Salon d'Automne of 1937

Georges fought during World War I and continued painting and selling his works successfully afterwards. He participated in shows such as the Salon des Indépendants and the Salon d'Automne. He received the Carnegie Prize in 1929 and was a member of the jury for the Prix de Rome.

The occupation of France in 1940 was a great sadness to him and he died heartbroken in Salles-en-Beaujolais in 1943.

== Museums ==
=== French museums ===
- Musée du Luxembourg:

- Le Palais Pisani à Venise
- Le violon 1926
- Portail de palais à Venise 1930

- Musée National d'Art Moderne - Georges Pompidou (Beaubourg): Vue de Sienne 1907

- Palais de Tokyo: Nature morte à la Langouste 1930

- Musées de la ville de Paris:

- Le vieille Hôtel Fieubet à Paris 1935
- Intérieur 1936
- La villa Paradiso à Gênes 1938

- Maison Victor Hugo de Paris: La maison Victor Hugo à Bruxelles 1933

- Musée Toulouse-Lautrec d'Albi:

- Place des Vosges un jour de pluie
- Saint Etienne la Varenne en Beaujolais

- Musée des Beaux-Arts de Nantes: Nature morte au faisan 1928

- Musée de la ville de Saint-Quentin-en-Yvelines: Les Tuileries

=== Other museums ===
- Pushkin Museum of Fine Arts: L'omnibus Bastille-Madeleine 1906

- National Museum of Serbia : Nature morte aux fleurs 1935

- Carnegie Museums of Pittsburgh: La nature morte au violon 1929

- Birmingham Museum & Art Gallery: La Place des Vosges 1928

- Chrysler Foundation - Detroit (Michigan): La place de la Bastille

- Musée National des Beaux-Arts d'Alger: Place des Vosges

- Musée des Beaux-Arts de Gand: Vue de Sienne

- Musée royal d'art moderne à Bruxelles: Nature morte au piano-forte et au violon

== Bibliography ==
Gabriel Mourey: Georges Dufrénoy.Ed Crès, Paris 1930.
