= Philibert Secretan =

Swiss philosopher (1926–2024)

- Born: November 16, 1926; Geneva, Switzerland
- Died: December 22, 2024 (aged 98); Geneva, Switzerland
- Education: University of Strasbourg (PhD, 1969)
- Occupations: Philosopher, professor, journalist
- Spouse: Christiane Ullhofen

Philibert Secretan (16 November 1926 – 22 December 2024) was a Swiss philosopher, professor, and journalist, known for his work at the intersection of phenomenology and scholasticism, as well as for his numerous translations of philosophical works.

== Life and career ==
Born in Geneva on 16 November 1926, Secretan was the son of André Secretan, a federal civil servant and art critic, and Marie-Henriette née Gérold. He married Christiane Ullhofen, an Austrian national. After an incomplete novitiate with the Dominicans (1948), he studied philosophy in Strasbourg, where he was introduced to phenomenology by Paul Ricœur. He obtained his doctorate in philosophy in 1969.

Secretan held a variety of professional positions over his career. He served as editorial secretary at La Baconnière in Boudry (1953–1958), taught at the lycée in Sfax, Tunisia, worked as a journalist at the Tribune de Genève, and taught at the Collège Calvin in Geneva (1962–1990). He also contributed to the journal Esprit.

He was appointed lecturer (chargé de cours) in 1971, then associate professor of philosophy at the faculty of theology of the University of Fribourg (1978–1997). He was also a visiting professor at the Catholic University of Milan and in Mexico City.

Secretan was the author of several books and many translations of philosophical works, often situated at the intersection of phenomenology and scholasticism. He died in Geneva on 22 December 2024.

== Bibliography ==
=== Selected works ===
- Secrétan, Bernard: Secretan: 159 biographies, 2011, pp. 155, 157.
