= Lacenas =

- Commune
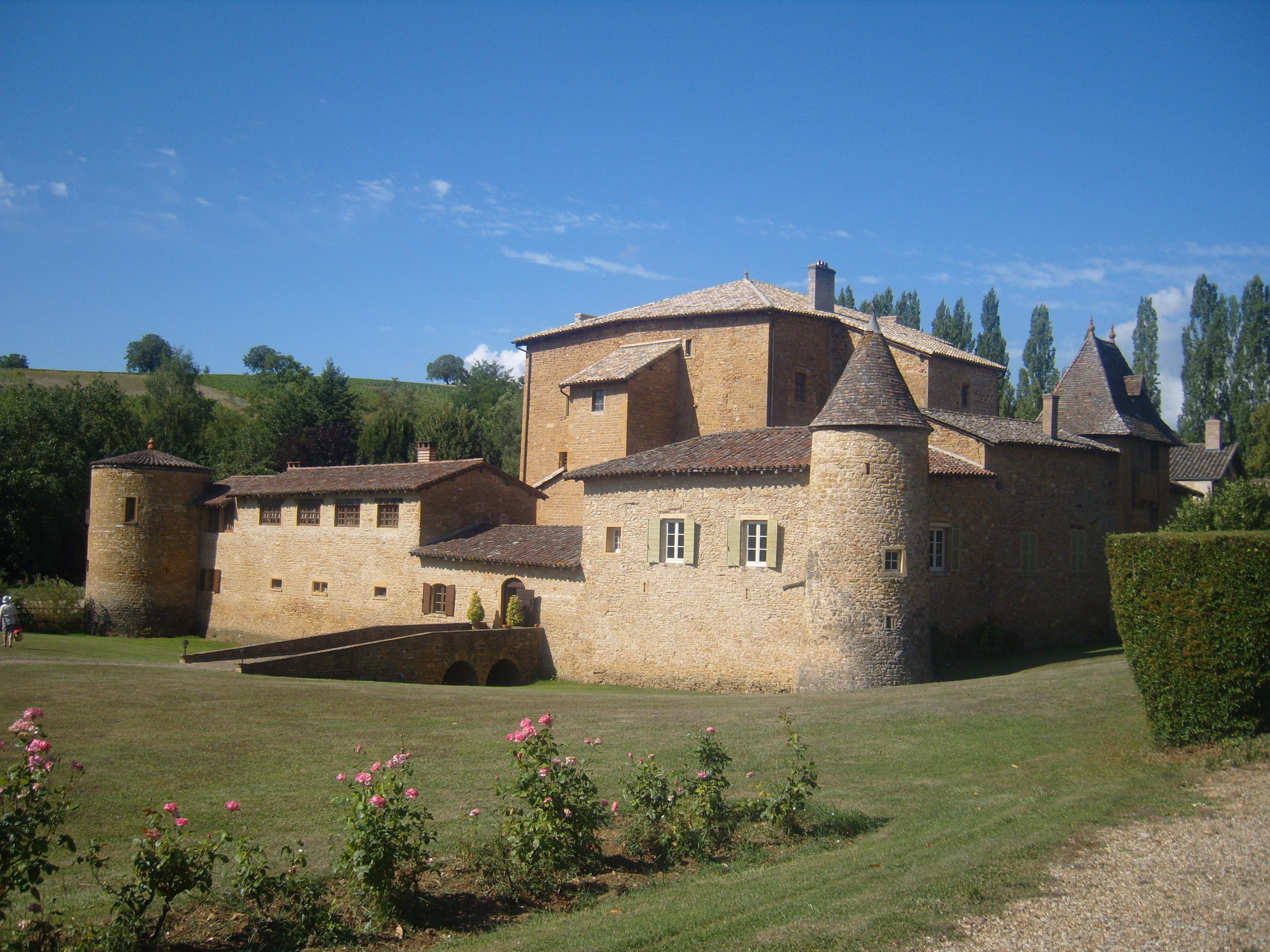
- The Château du Sou, in Lacenas
- Location of Lacenas
- Location within France Location within Auvergne-Rhône-Alpes
- Coordinates: 45°59′39″N 4°38′46″E
- Country: France
- Region: Auvergne-Rhône-Alpes
- Department: Rhône
- Arrondissement: Villefranche-sur-Saône
- Canton: Gleizé
- Intercommunality: CA Villefranche Beaujolais Saône

Government
  - Mayor (2020–2026): Catherine Rabourdin
- Area^{1}: 3.36 km^{2} (1.30 sq mi)
- Elevation: 300 m (980 ft)
- Highest elevation: 371 m (1,217 ft)
- Lowest elevation: 229 m (751 ft)
- Population (2023): 1,076
  - Density: 320/km^{2} (829/sq mi)
- Time zone: UTC+01:00 (CET)
  - Summer (DST): UTC+02:00 (CEST)
- INSEE/Postal code: 69105 /69640
- ^{1} French Land Register data, which excludes lakes, ponds, glaciers > 1 km^{2} (0.386 sq mi or 247 acres) and river estuaries.

Lacenas (French pronunciation: [lasna]) is a commune in the Rhône department in eastern France.

== Twin towns — sister cities ==
- Canale d'Agordo in Italy (since 2006)

== See also ==
- Communes of the Rhône department
