= Montmelas-Saint-Sorlin =

- Commune
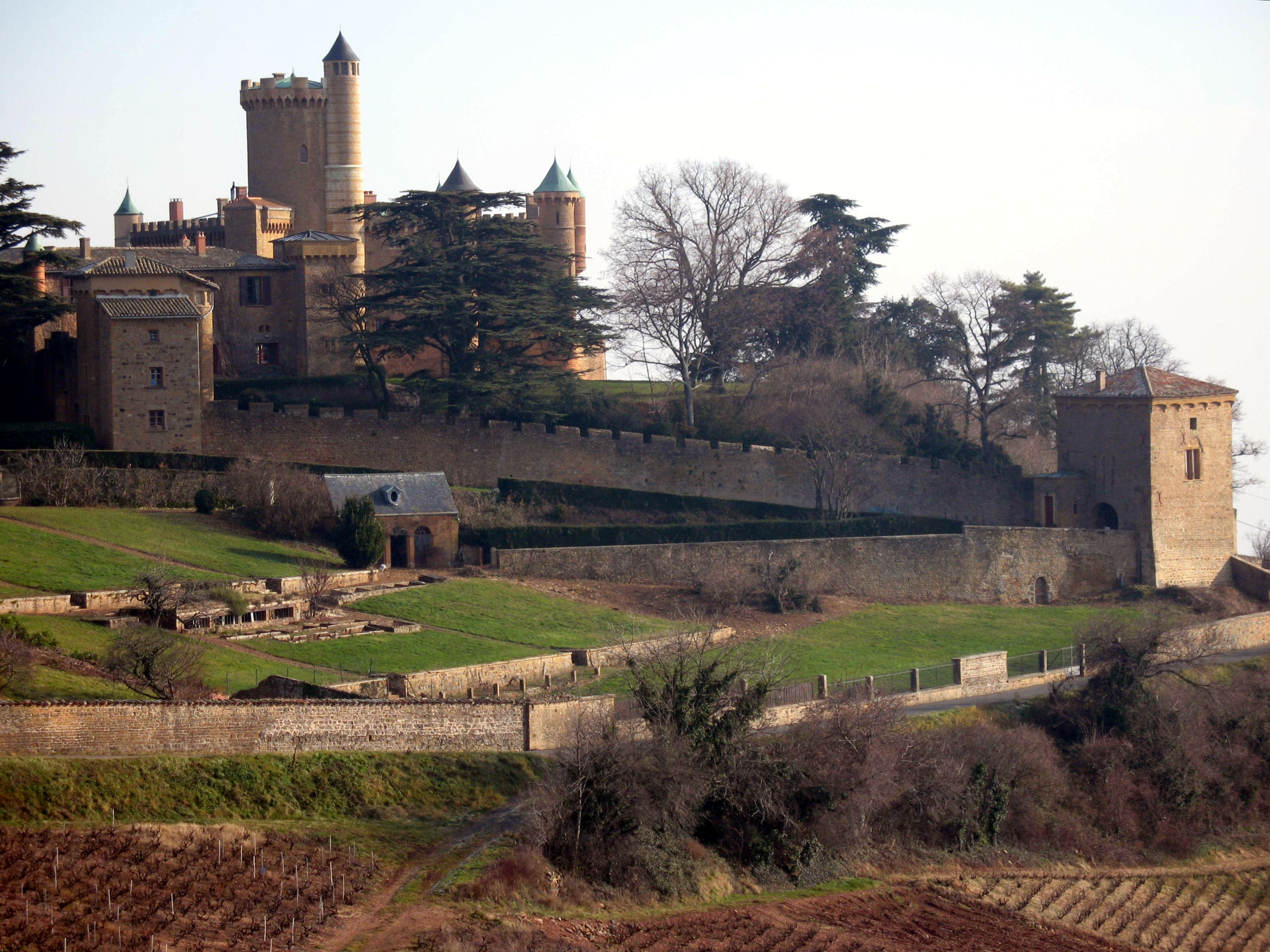
- The Château of Montmelas
- Location of Montmelas-Saint-Sorlin
- Location within France Location within Auvergne-Rhône-Alpes
- Coordinates: 46°00′58″N 4°36′38″E
- Country: France
- Region: Auvergne-Rhône-Alpes
- Department: Rhône
- Arrondissement: Villefranche-sur-Saône
- Canton: Gleizé
- Intercommunality: CA Villefranche Beaujolais Saône

Government
  - Mayor (2020–2026): Michel Trouvé
- Area^{1}: 4.24 km^{2} (1.64 sq mi)
- Elevation: 500 m (1,600 ft)
- Highest elevation: 732 m (2,402 ft)
- Lowest elevation: 369 m (1,211 ft)
- Population (2023): 528
  - Density: 125/km^{2} (323/sq mi)
- Time zone: UTC+01:00 (CET)
  - Summer (DST): UTC+02:00 (CEST)
- INSEE/Postal code: 69137 /69640
- ^{1} French Land Register data, which excludes lakes, ponds, glaciers > 1 km^{2} (0.386 sq mi or 247 acres) and river estuaries.

Montmelas-Saint-Sorlin (French pronunciation: [mɔ̃məla sɛ̃ sɔʁlɛ̃]) is a commune in the Rhône department in eastern France.

== Buildings ==
=== Château of Montmelas ===
The first written records of the existence of Château de Montmelas date from the 10th century. The place belonged to the Sires of Beaujeu who set up a garrison there to defend the South of their territory. Built on a rocky outcrop overlooking the entire region, the garrison enjoyed a strategic defensive position.

In 1566 the Château de Montmelas was sold to Jean Arod. He died in 1593 during an assault on the fortress during the French Wars of Religion. In 1766, Blaise Arod, Marquess of Montmelas, married Marguerite-Catherine Haynault, mistress of Louis XV. She lived in Montmelas until her death in 1823. During the French Revolution, Gaspard de Montmelas, Blaise's younger brother, was imprisoned in Lyon; a delegation of villagers took the road to deliver him.

Since 1566 the family's successors have passed on the castle until they joined the Harcourt family, owner of the castle today. The Château de Montmelas is a private property which can be visited and which produces Beaujolais wine.

Description of the building: Built in the 12th century, the castle was profoundly altered over the centuries and in particular in the 19th century, after 1828, by Louis Dupasquier, a contemporary Lyonnais architect of Viollet-le-Duc, from a drawing of the 17th century. It nevertheless retained many elements from the 15th and 16th centuries and the work aimed to restore a complete medieval fortress. The castle is surrounded by a vast park, a formal garden and a crenellated exterior wall.

There remains of the medieval castle a cylindrical keep which dominates a quadrangular enclosure provided with the angles of watchtowers, as well as a vast fenced poultry yard.

=== Saint-Bonnet Chapel ===
This Romanesque chapel was built in the 12th century. It was classified as a Monument Historique in 1981 (a distinction given to some national heritage sites in France).

It is situated on the top of the Saint-Bonnet hill, overlooking the whole Rhône and Ain departments, from Mâcon in the North to Lyon in the South, and to the Alps in the East. The Mont-Blanc can even be seen on sunny days.

An association called "Autour de la chapelle Saint Bonnet" was created in 2019 to raise funds to restore the building that has been crumbling down over the years.

== Demographics ==
The inhabitants of Montmelas are called the Montmelassiens, Montmelassiennes. The population has been on the rise since the 1960s, after a century of sharp decline. The retirement home La Clairière accounts for a sizeable part of the population.

== See also ==
- Communes of the Rhône department
