= Vaux-en-Beaujolais =

- Commune
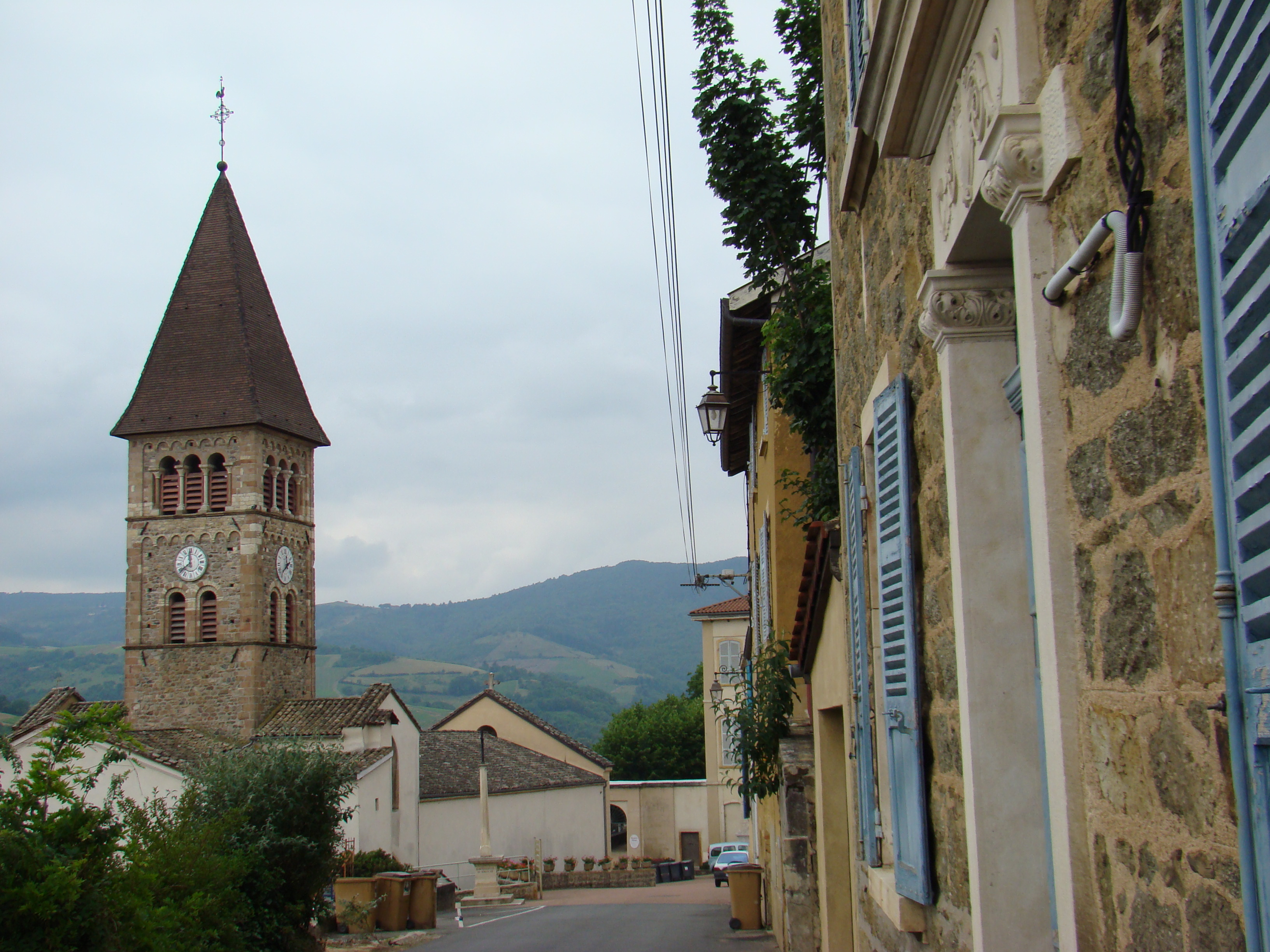
- The church in Vaux-en-Beaujolais
- Location of Vaux-en-Beaujolais
- Location within France Location within Auvergne-Rhône-Alpes
- Coordinates: 46°03′25″N 4°35′33″E
- Country: France
- Region: Auvergne-Rhône-Alpes
- Department: Rhône
- Arrondissement: Villefranche-sur-Saône
- Canton: Gleizé
- Intercommunality: CA Villefranche Beaujolais Saône

Government
  - Mayor (2020–2026): Jean-Charles Perrin
- Area^{1}: 17.74 km^{2} (6.85 sq mi)
- Elevation: 360 m (1,180 ft)
- Highest elevation: 820 m (2,690 ft)
- Lowest elevation: 270 m (890 ft)
- Population (2023): 1,169
  - Density: 65.90/km^{2} (170.7/sq mi)
- Time zone: UTC+01:00 (CET)
  - Summer (DST): UTC+02:00 (CEST)
- INSEE/Postal code: 69257 /69460
- ^{1} French Land Register data, which excludes lakes, ponds, glaciers > 1 km^{2} (0.386 sq mi or 247 acres) and river estuaries.

Vaux-en-Beaujolais (French pronunciation: [vo ɑ̃ boʒɔlɛ], literally Vaux in Beaujolais) is a commune in the Rhône department in eastern France. It is the inspiration for the fictional town of Clochemerle.

== See also ==
- Communes of the Rhône department
