= Château du Sou =

Converted castle in Lacenas, France

Coordinates: 45°58′53″N 4°38′22″E

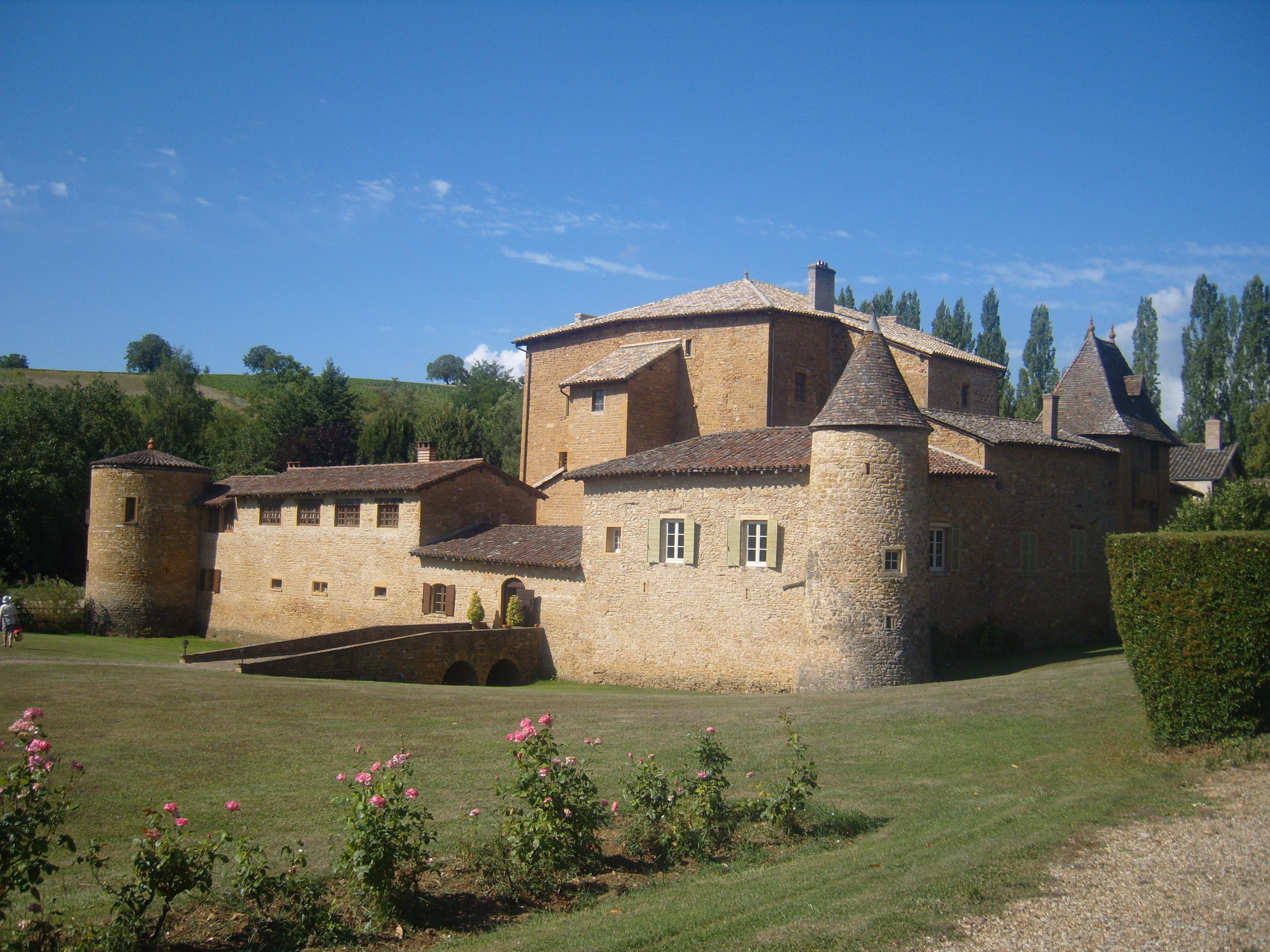
Château du Sou

The Château du Sou, situated at the bottom of the Morgon valley, is a converted castle in the commune of Lacenas, west of Villefranche-sur-Saône, in the Rhône département of France.

It is privately owned. It is available for receptions, weddings, themed events etc.

== History ==
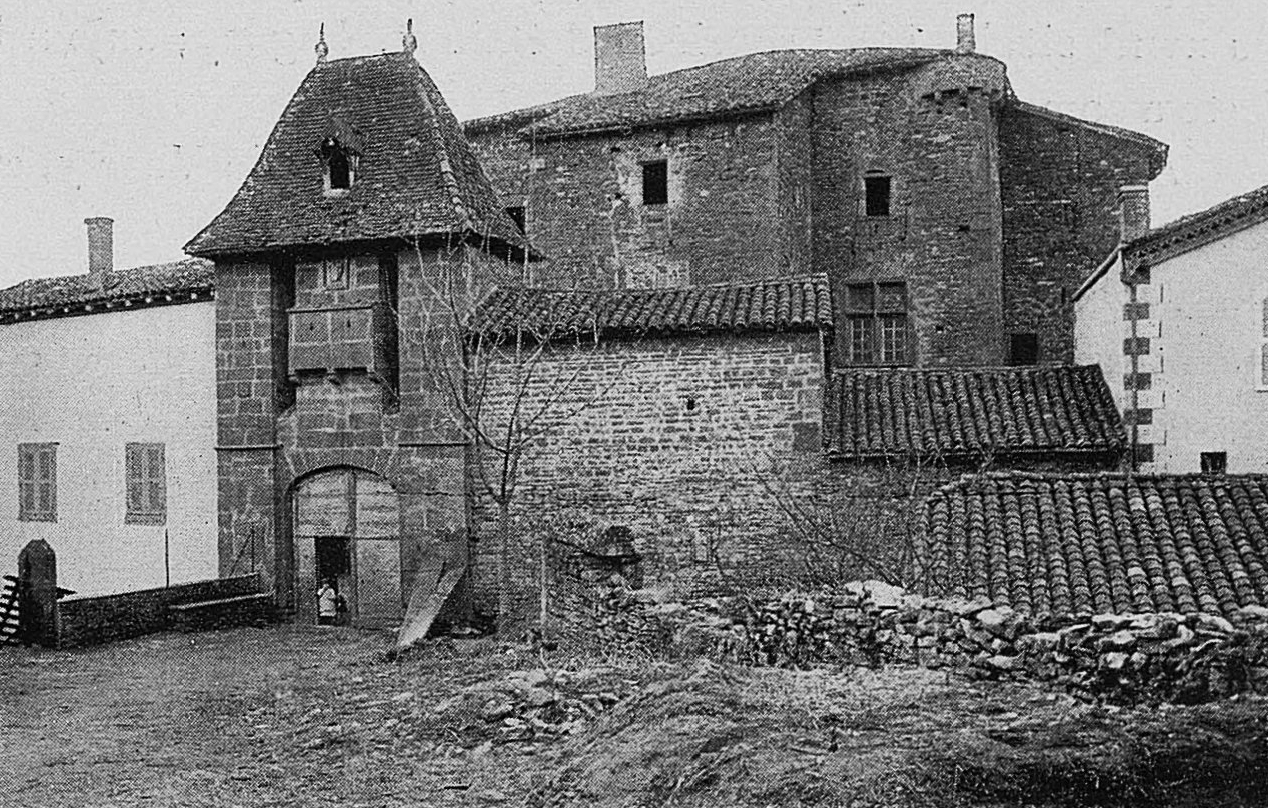
The castle in 1901-1902

It was probably Jean de Thélis-L'Espinasse who built the castle. He became Governor and Lieutenant-General of Beaujolais in 1369. He married Artaude de Charnay; their son Jean married Agnès Vert, dame de Valprivas, but died without issue and the succession passed to their nephew, Jocerand. He was a squire of the Lord of Beaujel to whom he gave homage for Sou in 1475, as did his nephew and successor Antoine in 1506. Antoine married his cousin Jeanne de Saint-Romain, dame de Valorges; their son Louis married Jacqueline de Salemard.

In 1539, Louis de Thélis sold the castle to Claude de Gaspard. In the 16th century, one of the descendants, Jean, Lieutenant-General of the Bailiwick of Beaujolais, married Claudine de Tenay. Claude, lord of Sou, married Marguerite de la Porte in 1577; he was a counsellor to the King and General Receiver of Taxes in the Généralité of Lyon. In the 17th century, Marc, lord of Sou, married Sibylle de Saint-Amour around 1690 and gave the castle to his brother Joseph Marie, a superior priest at the seminary of Orléans in 1766; the latter gave the property to his cousin Mignot de Bussy in 1767.

His son, Aimé Antoine, Count of Sou, emigrated during the French Revolution and the château was sold as a national property. It is now owned by several proprietors who share the estate.

== Architecture ==
Construction work, in the golden stone of the region, dates from approximately 1369. The fortified enceinte, dotted with towers, forms an almost perfect square. There remain some traces of moats and the drawbridge. The keep has three upper storeys as well as the ground floor.

A Gothic chapel contains sculptures, including two angel heads.

On the northern side, the fortified gateway is decorated with 13 blazons or coats of arms: at the top is the blazon of the Gaspards, to the left are six more of the same and, to the right, six other blazons relating to their wives. During the Revolution, these blazons were damaged by hammer blows. The fortified gateway was listed on 21 February 1933 as a monument historique by the French Ministry of Culture.

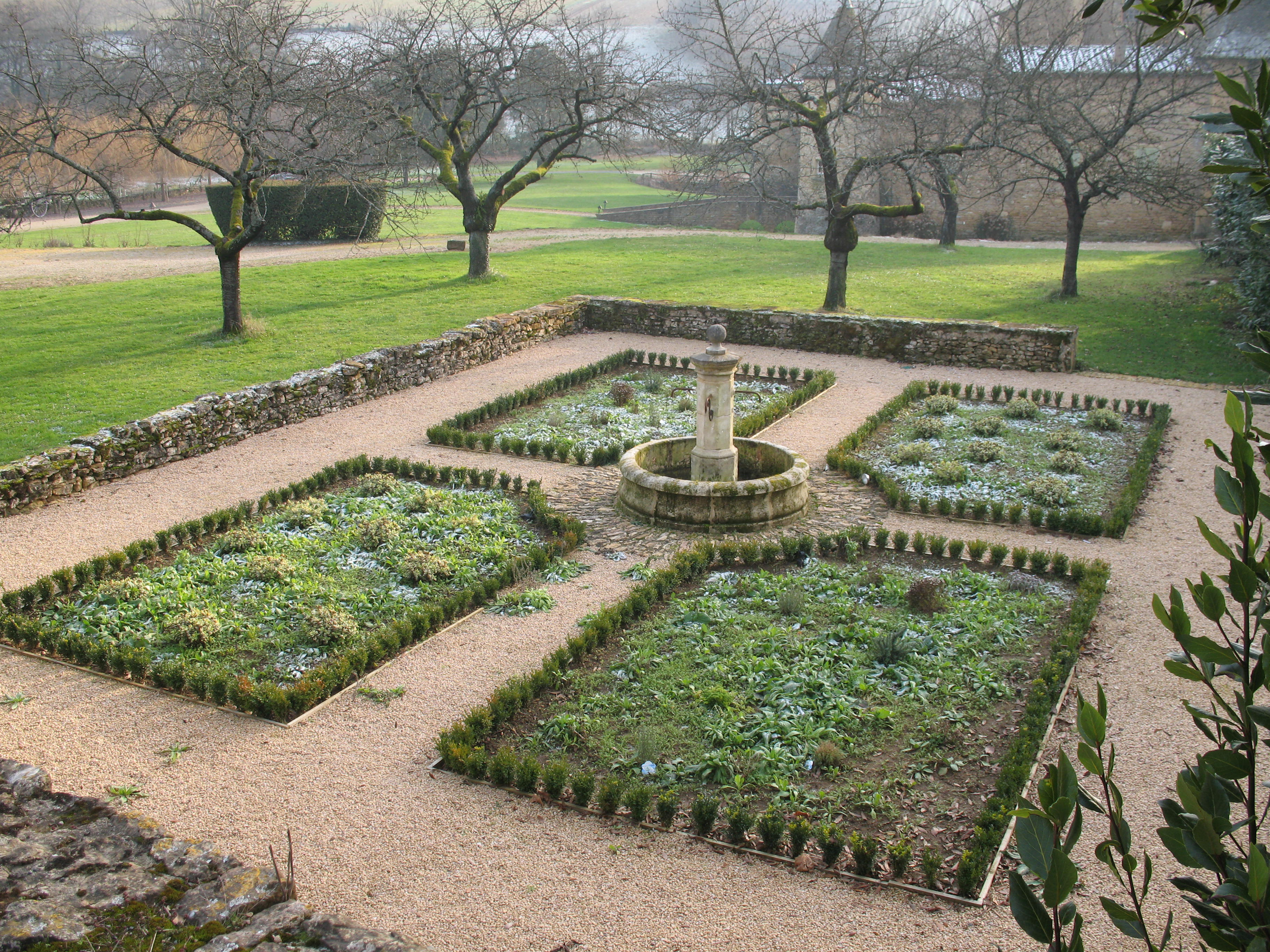
Garden and fountain

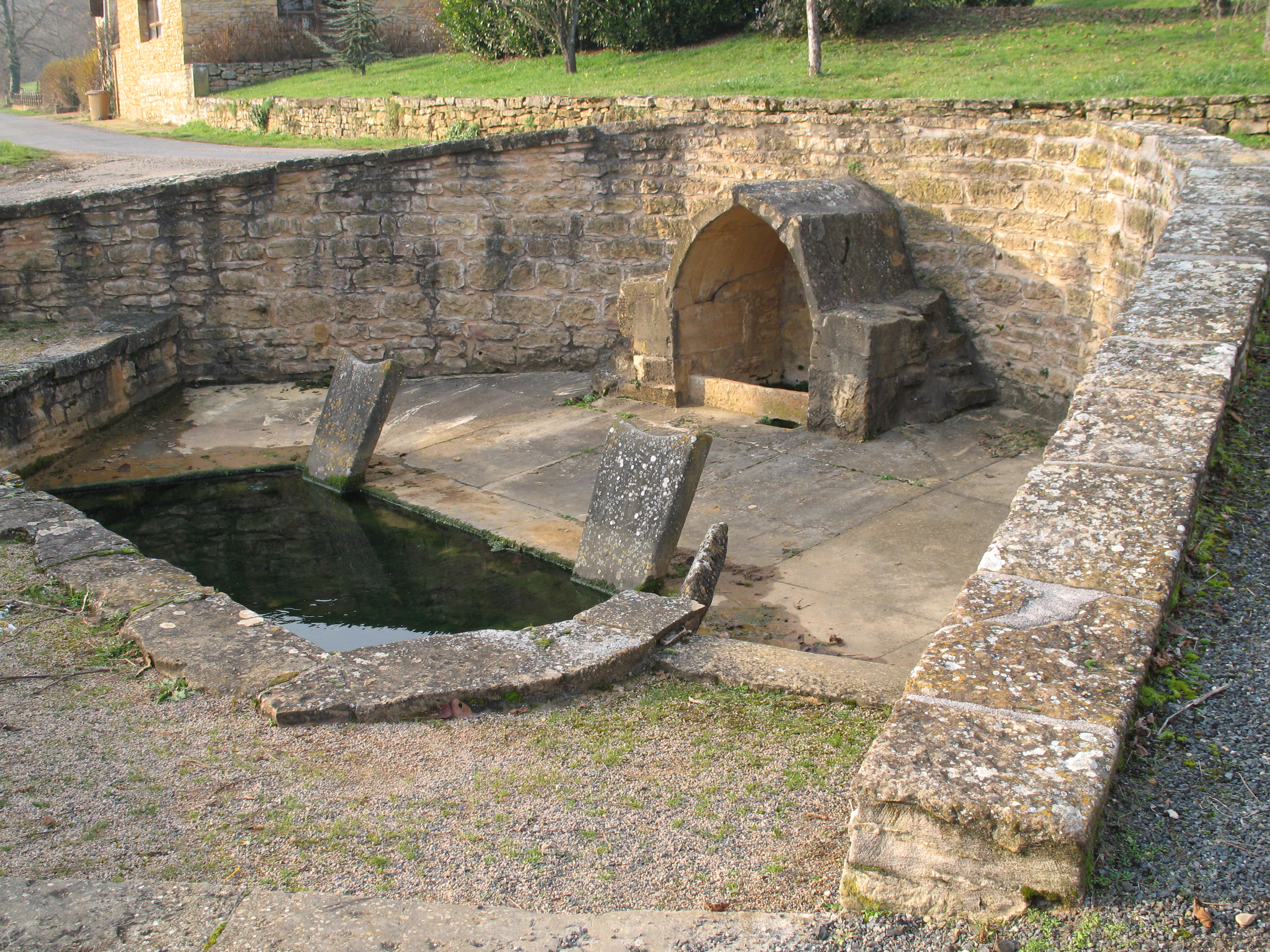
Lavoir

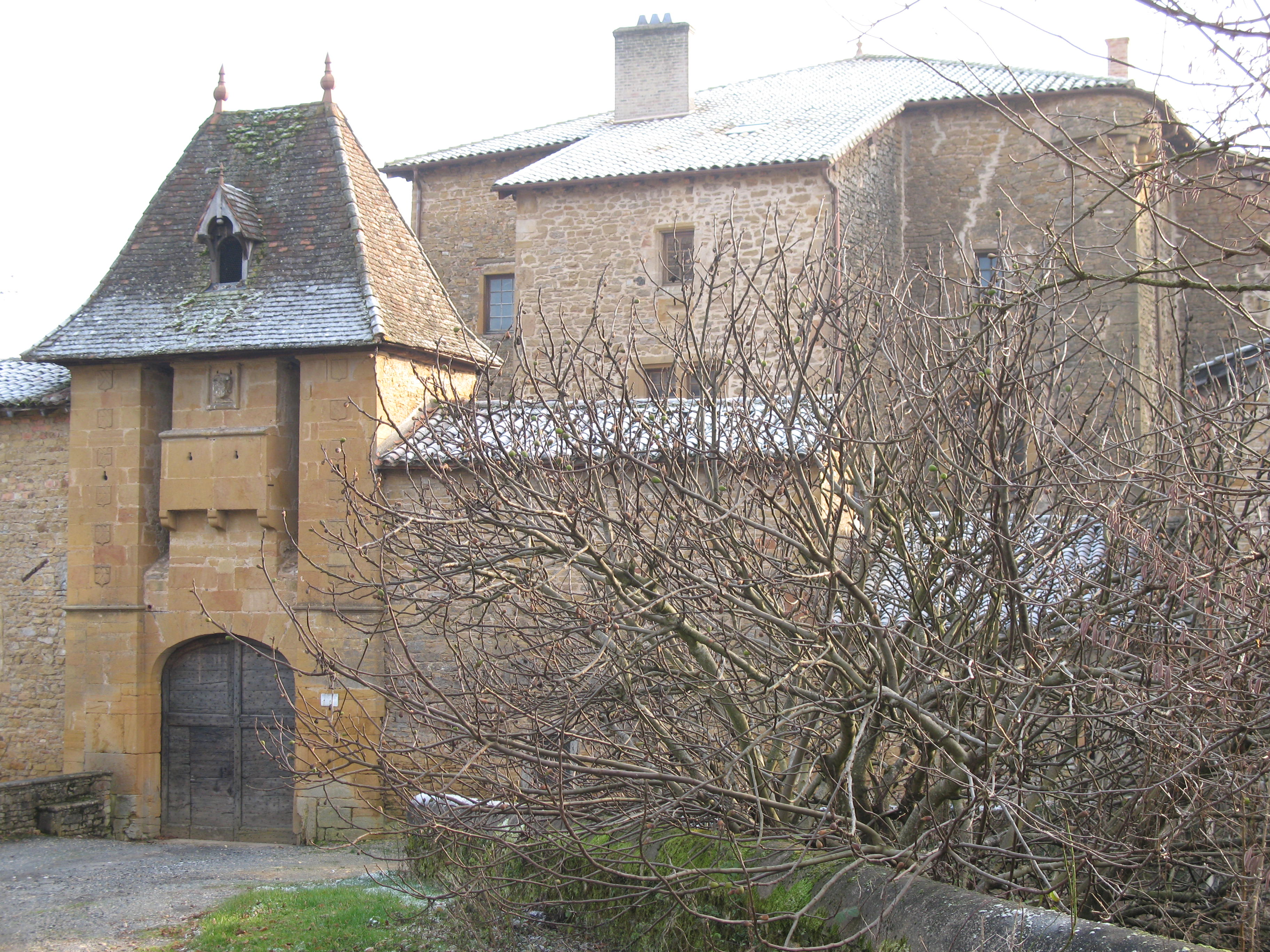
Fortified gateway with 13 blazons

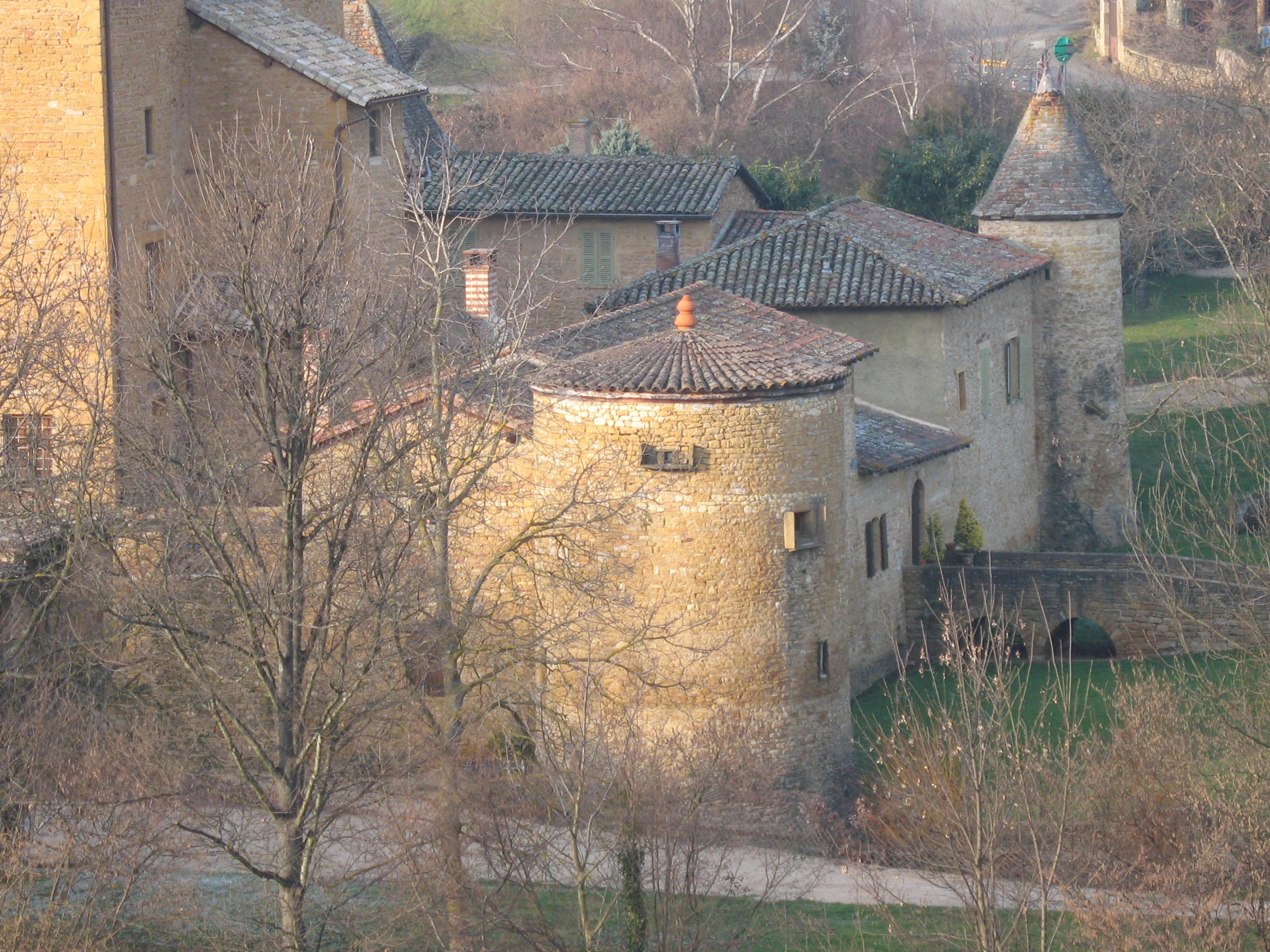
South and east sides of the enceinte

== Park and gardens ==
A park, including a medieval garden, surrounds the château. The public lavoir situated at the entrance to the lane leading to the château is fed by the fountain.

== See also ==
- List of castles in France
- Lacenas
