= Saint-Étienne-des-Oullières =

- Commune
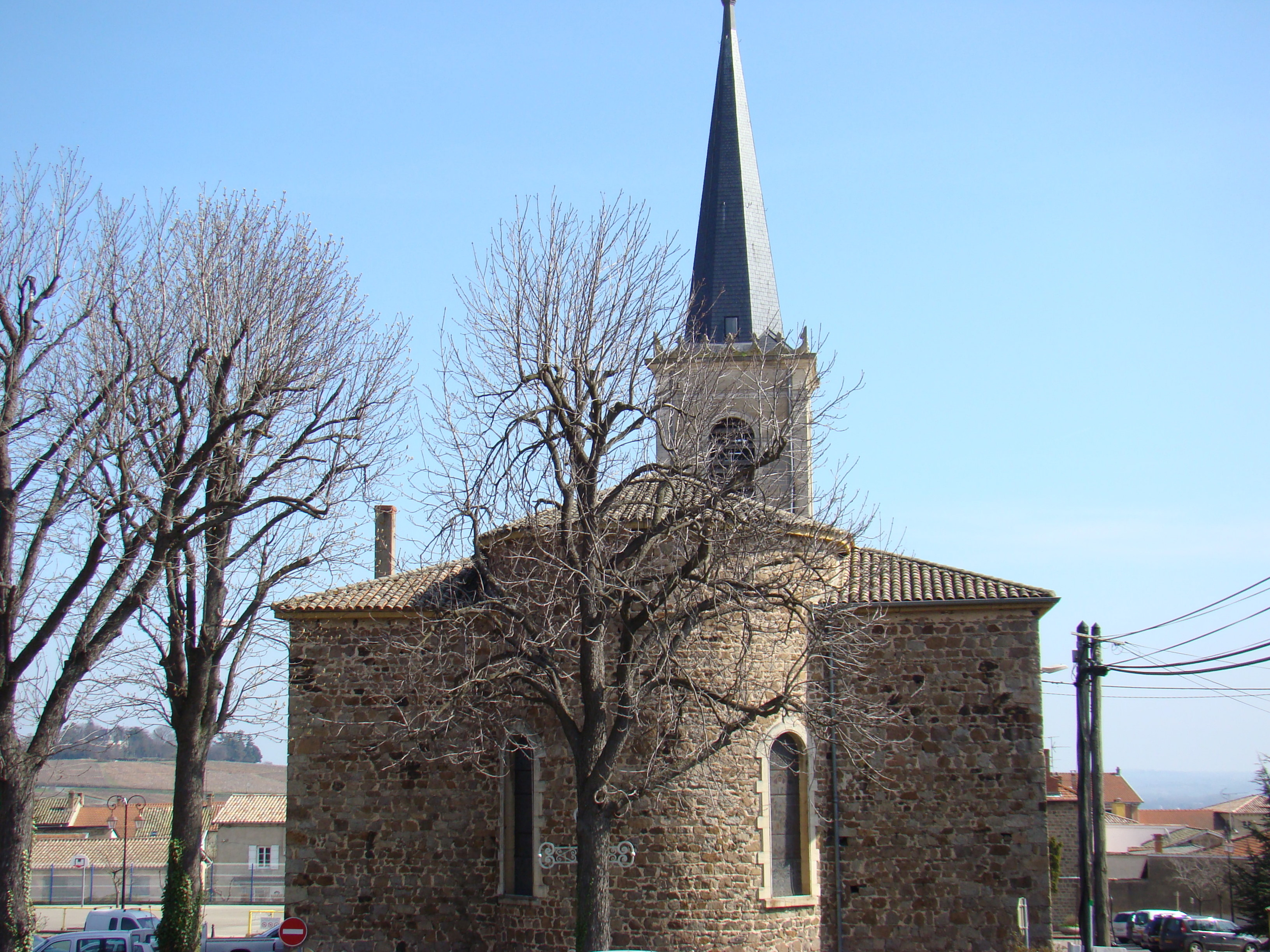
- The church
- Location of Saint-Étienne-des-Oullières
- Location within France Location within Auvergne-Rhône-Alpes
- Coordinates: 46°04′05″N 4°39′01″E
- Country: France
- Region: Auvergne-Rhône-Alpes
- Department: Rhône
- Arrondissement: Villefranche-sur-Saône
- Canton: Gleizé
- Intercommunality: CA Villefranche Beaujolais Saône

Government
  - Mayor (2020–2026): Gilles Duthel
- Area^{1}: 9.66 km^{2} (3.73 sq mi)
- Elevation: 248 m (814 ft)
- Highest elevation: 331 m (1,086 ft)
- Lowest elevation: 204 m (669 ft)
- Population (2023): 2,264
  - Density: 234/km^{2} (607/sq mi)
- Time zone: UTC+01:00 (CET)
  - Summer (DST): UTC+02:00 (CEST)
- INSEE/Postal code: 69197 /69460
- ^{1} French Land Register data, which excludes lakes, ponds, glaciers > 1 km^{2} (0.386 sq mi or 247 acres) and river estuaries.

Saint-Étienne-des-Oullières is a commune in the Rhône department in eastern France.

== Population ==
Historical population
Year	Pop.	±% p.a.
1968	1,143	—
1975	1,093	−0.64%
1982	1,137	+0.57%
1990	1,367	+2.33%
1999	1,519	+1.18%
2007	1,768	+1.92%
2012	1,942	+1.90%
2017	2,207	+2.59%
2023	2,264	+0.43%
Source: INSEE

== See also ==
- Communes of the Rhône department
