= Saint-Cyr-le-Chatoux =

- Commune
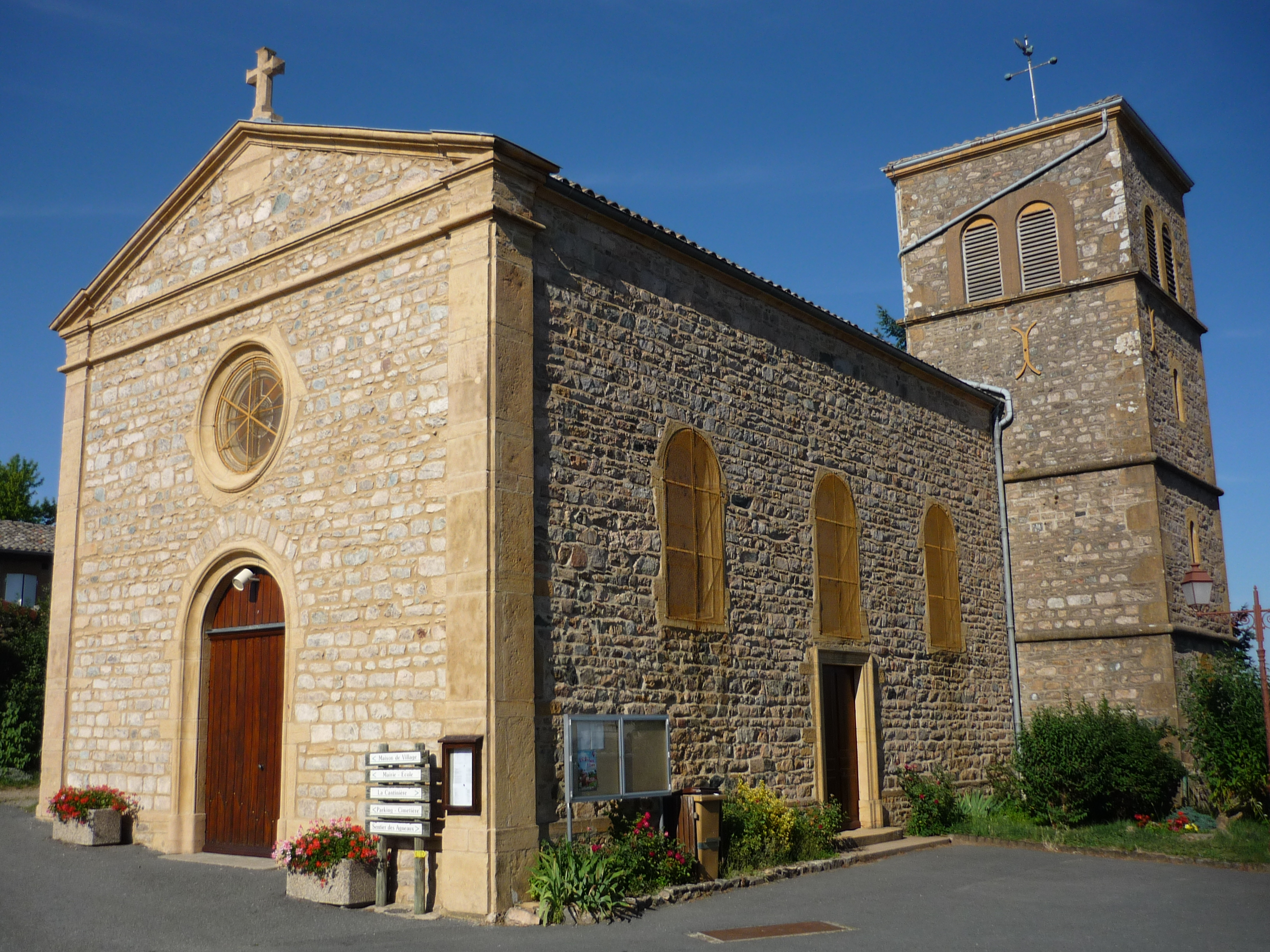
- The church in Saint-Cyr-le-Chatoux

- Coat of arms
- Location of Saint-Cyr-le-Chatoux
- Location within France Location within Auvergne-Rhône-Alpes
- Coordinates: 46°01′38″N 4°33′24″E
- Country: France
- Region: Auvergne-Rhône-Alpes
- Department: Rhône
- Arrondissement: Villefranche-sur-Saône
- Canton: Gleizé
- Intercommunality: CA Villefranche Beaujolais Saône

Government
  - Mayor (2020–2026): Jean-Pierre Dumontet
- Area^{1}: 6.28 km^{2} (2.42 sq mi)
- Elevation: 700 m (2,300 ft)
- Highest elevation: 841 m (2,759 ft)
- Lowest elevation: 371 m (1,217 ft)
- Population (2023): 154
  - Density: 24.5/km^{2} (63.5/sq mi)
- Time zone: UTC+01:00 (CET)
  - Summer (DST): UTC+02:00 (CEST)
- INSEE/Postal code: 69192 /69870
- ^{1} French Land Register data, which excludes lakes, ponds, glaciers > 1 km^{2} (0.386 sq mi or 247 acres) and river estuaries.

Saint-Cyr-le-Chatoux (French pronunciation: [sɛ̃ siʁ lə ʃatu]) is a commune in the Rhône department in eastern France.

== See also ==
- Communes of the Rhône department
