= Communauté d'agglomération Villefranche Beaujolais Saône =

Villefranche Beaujolais Saône
- Communauté d'agglomération
- Interactive map of Villefranche Beaujolais Saône
- Coordinates: 46°00′N 04°40′E
- Country: France
- Region: Auvergne-Rhône-Alpes
- Department: Ain, Rhône
- No. of communes: {{{nbcomm}}}
- Established: 2014
- Area: 167.7 km^{2} (64.7 sq mi)
- Population (2019): 72,815
  - Density: 434.2/km^{2} (1,125/sq mi)
- Website: www.agglo-villefranche.fr

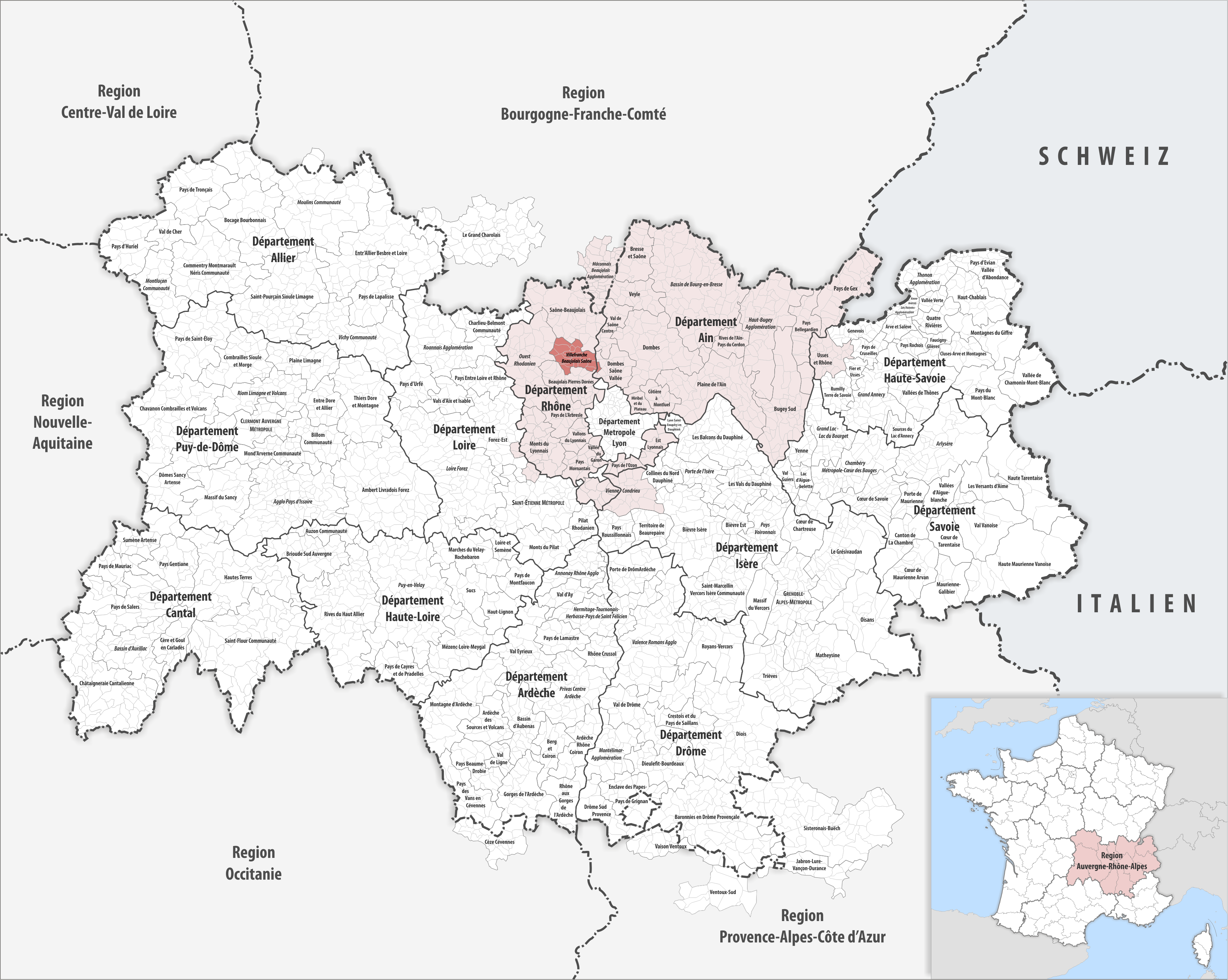
Villefranche Beaujolais Saône

Communauté d'agglomération Villefranche Beaujolais Saône is the communauté d'agglomération, an intercommunal structure, centred on the town of Villefranche-sur-Saône. It is located in the Rhône and Ain departments, in the Auvergne-Rhône-Alpes region, eastern France. Created in 2014, its seat is in Villefranche-sur-Saône. Its area is 167.7 km^{2}. Its population was 72,815 in 2019, of which 36,291 in Villefranche-sur-Saône proper.

== Composition ==
The communauté d'agglomération consists of the following 18 communes, of which one (Jassans-Riottier) in the Ain department:

1. Arnas
2. Blacé
3. Cogny
4. Denicé
5. Gleizé
6. Jassans-Riottier
7. Lacenas
8. Limas
9. Montmelas-Saint-Sorlin
10. Le Perréon
11. Rivolet
12. Saint-Cyr-le-Chatoux
13. Saint-Étienne-des-Oullières
14. Saint-Julien
15. Salles-Arbuissonnas-en-Beaujolais
16. Vaux-en-Beaujolais
17. Villefranche-sur-Saône
18. Ville-sur-Jarnioux
