= Limas, Rhône =

Limas
- Commune
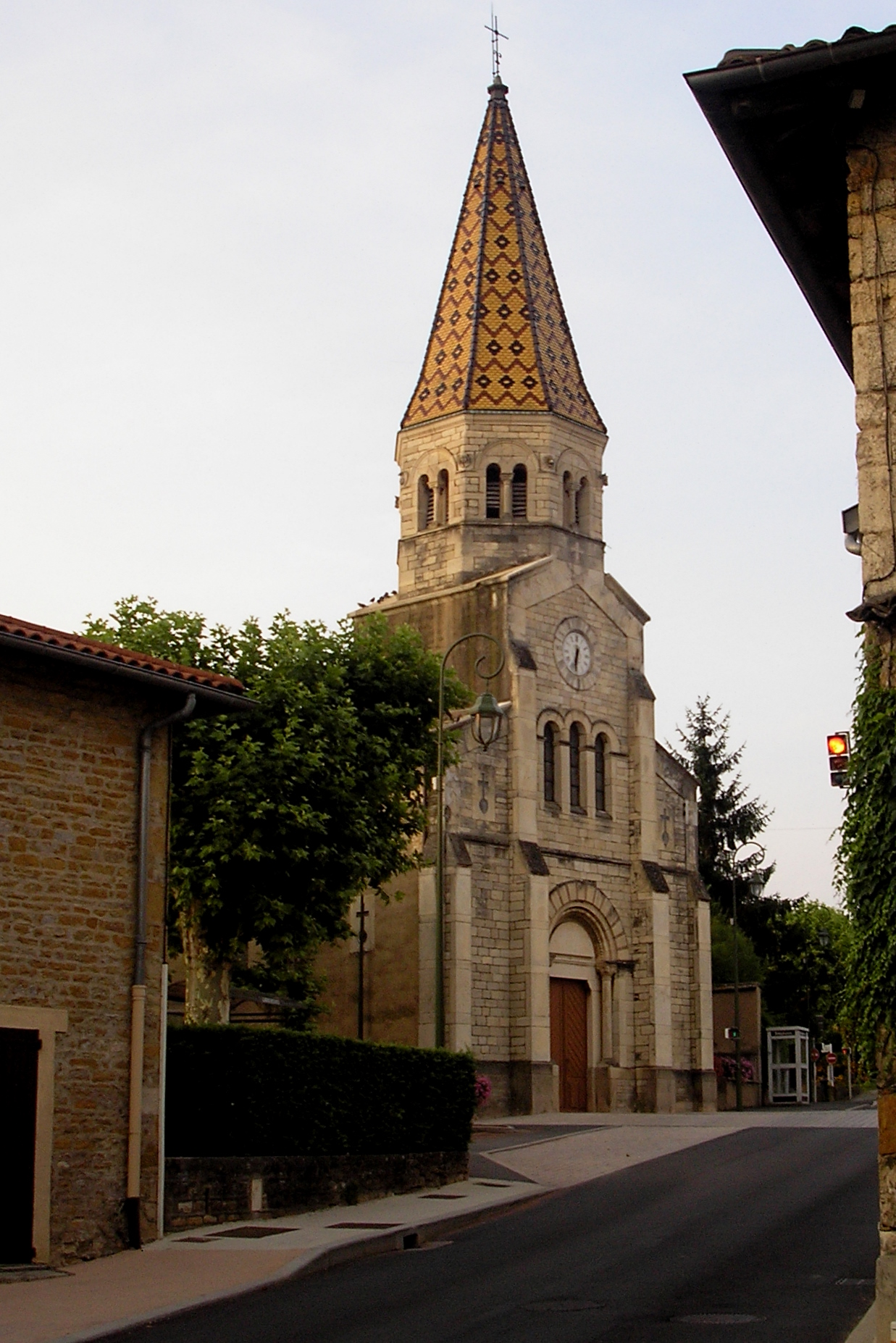
- The church in Limas
- Location of Limas
- Location within France Location within Auvergne-Rhône-Alpes
- Coordinates: 45°58′35″N 4°42′22″E
- Country: France
- Region: Auvergne-Rhône-Alpes
- Department: Rhône
- Arrondissement: Villefranche-sur-Saône
- Canton: Gleizé
- Intercommunality: CA Villefranche Beaujolais Saône

Government
  - Mayor (2020–2026): Michel Thien
- Area^{1}: 5.52 km^{2} (2.13 sq mi)
- Elevation: 191 m (627 ft)
- Highest elevation: 332 m (1,089 ft)
- Lowest elevation: 168 m (551 ft)
- Population (2023): 4,750
  - Density: 861/km^{2} (2,230/sq mi)
- Time zone: UTC+01:00 (CET)
  - Summer (DST): UTC+02:00 (CEST)
- INSEE/Postal code: 69115 /69400
- ^{1} French Land Register data, which excludes lakes, ponds, glaciers > 1 km^{2} (0.386 sq mi or 247 acres) and river estuaries.

Limas (French pronunciation: [lima]) is a commune in the Rhône department in eastern France.

== Population ==
Historical population
Year	Pop.	±% p.a.
1968	1,770	—
1975	3,216	+8.91%
1982	3,463	+1.06%
1990	3,652	+0.67%
1999	4,151	+1.43%
2007	4,386	+0.69%
2012	4,549	+0.73%
2017	4,803	+1.09%
2023	4,750	−0.18%
Source: INSEE

== See also ==
- Communes of the Rhône department
