= Le Perréon =

- Commune
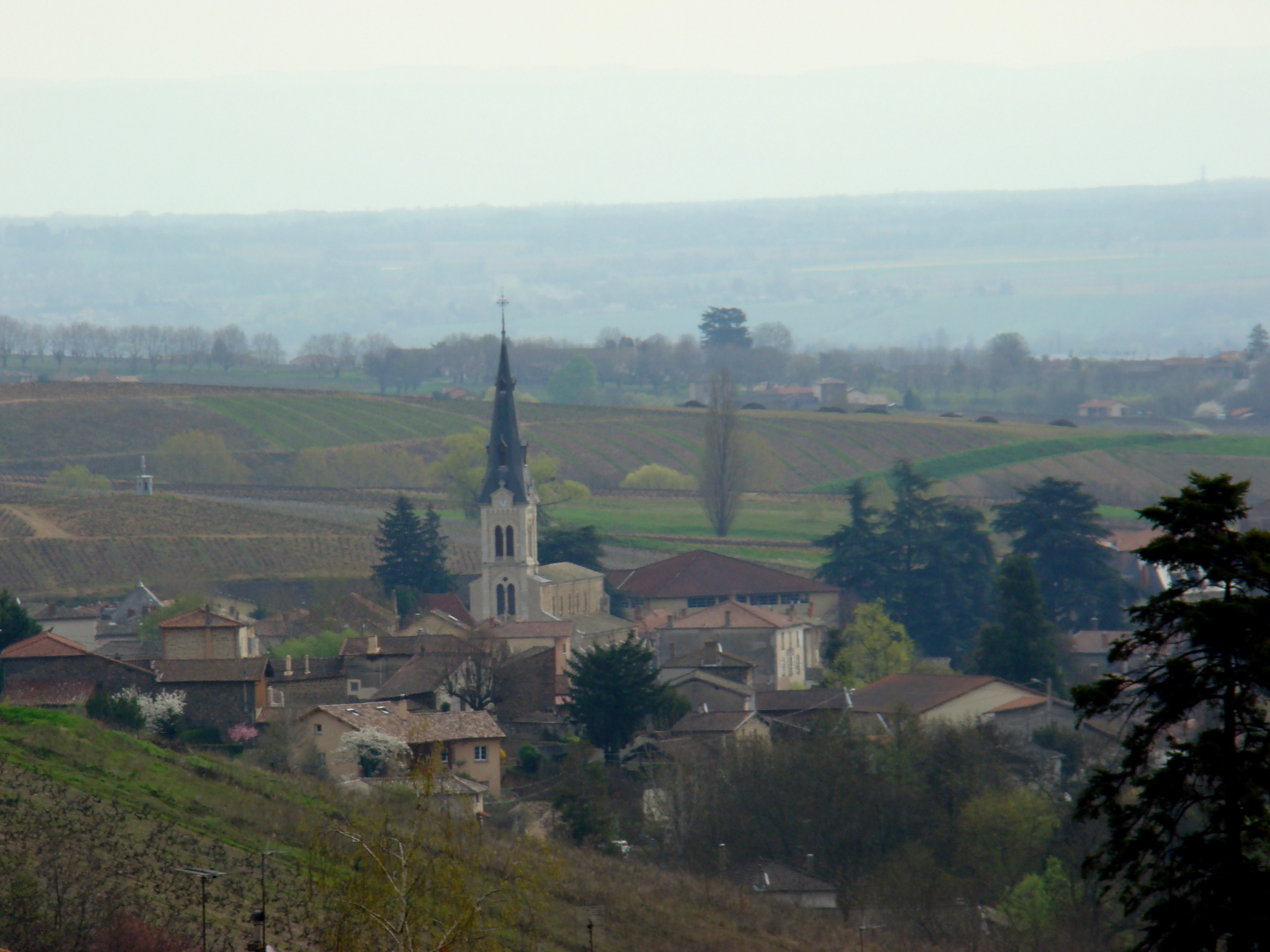
- The church and surrounding buildings in Le Perréon
- Location of Le Perréon
- Location within France Location within Auvergne-Rhône-Alpes
- Coordinates: 46°03′49″N 4°36′04″E
- Country: France
- Region: Auvergne-Rhône-Alpes
- Department: Rhône
- Arrondissement: Villefranche-sur-Saône
- Canton: Gleizé
- Intercommunality: CA Villefranche Beaujolais Saône

Government
  - Mayor (2020–2026): Gérard Tachon
- Area^{1}: 14.58 km^{2} (5.63 sq mi)
- Elevation: 300 m (980 ft)
- Highest elevation: 783 m (2,569 ft)
- Lowest elevation: 253 m (830 ft)
- Population (2023): 1,500
  - Density: 100/km^{2} (270/sq mi)
- Time zone: UTC+01:00 (CET)
  - Summer (DST): UTC+02:00 (CEST)
- INSEE/Postal code: 69151 /69460
- ^{1} French Land Register data, which excludes lakes, ponds, glaciers > 1 km^{2} (0.386 sq mi or 247 acres) and river estuaries.

Le Perréon (French pronunciation: [lə peʁeɔ̃]) is a commune in the Rhône department in eastern France.

== See also ==
- Communes of the Rhône department
- Château Grand'Grange
