= Canton of Gleizé =

Coordinates: 46.0168°N 4.6373°E

Gleizé
- Canton
- Country: France
- Region: Auvergne-Rhône-Alpes
- Department: Rhône
- No. of communes: {{{nbcomm}}}
- Area: 164.92 km^{2} (63.68 sq mi)
- Population (2023): 34,409
  - Density: 208.64/km^{2} (540.38/sq mi)
- INSEE code: 6907

The Canton of Gleizé is a French administrative division, located in the Rhône department.

The canton was established in 2001 and modified by decree of 27 February 2014 which came into force in March 2015.

== Composition ==
The canton of gleizé is composed of 15 communes:

Communes	Population (2012)
Arnas	3,409
Blacé	1,430
Denicé	1,347
Gleizé	7,605
Lacenas	904
Le Perréon	1,436
Limas	4,549
Montmelas-Saint-Sorlin	438
Rivolet	564
Saint-Cyr-le-Chatoux	132
Saint-Étienne-des-Oullières	1,942
Saint-Georges-de-Reneins	4,292
Saint-Julien	821
Salles-Arbuissonnas-en-Beaujolais	816
Vaux-en-Beaujolais	1,064

== See also ==
- Cantons of the Rhône department
- Communes of the Rhône department
