= Église Saint-Corneille-et-Saint-Cyprien =

Demolished church in La Baconnière, France

Church of La Baconnière
- Église Saint-Corneille-et-Saint-Cyprien de La Baconnière
- Église Saint-Corneille-et-Saint-Cyprien
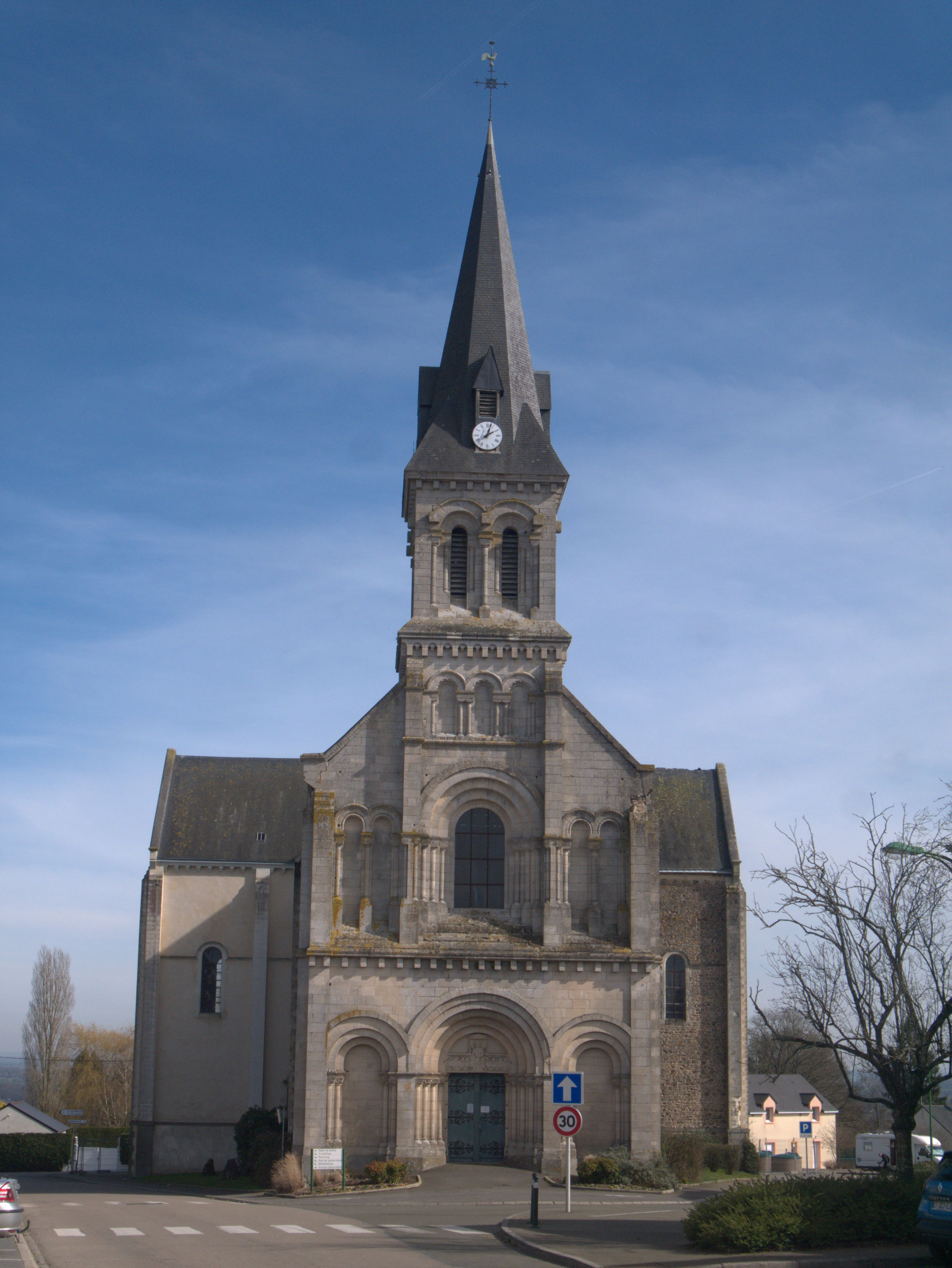
- Church of La Baconnière
- 48.18362°N 0.89201°W
- Location: La Baconnière, Mayenne
- Country: France
- Denomination: Roman Catholic

History
- Status: Church
- Founded: 1864
- Dedication: Saint Cyprian and Pope Cornelius

Architecture
- Architect: Pierre-Aimé Renous
- Architectural type: Romanesque Revival
- Closed: 16 May 2014
- Demolished: July/August 2023

Administration
- Archdiocese: Roman Catholic Archdiocese of Rennes, Dol and Saint-Malo
- Diocese: Roman Catholic Diocese of Laval

The Church of La Baconnière, officially Église Saint-Corneille-et-Saint-Cyprien, was a church located in the commune of La Baconnière, in the Mayenne department of France.

== History ==
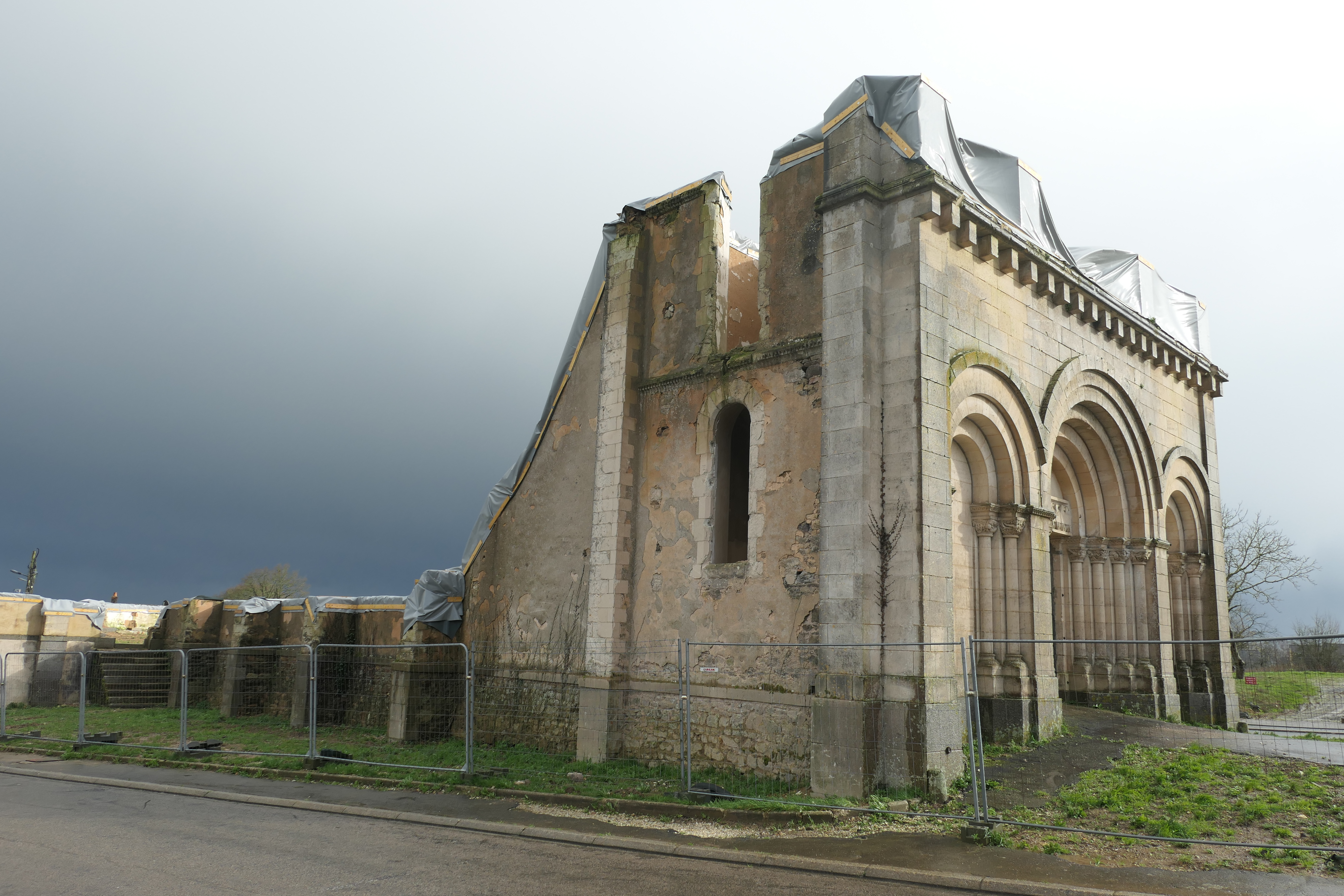
Remains of the Church of La Baconnière, 22 February 2024.

The Church of La Baconnière was built to replace an earlier church dedicated to Saint Cornelius and Saint Cyprian. Its nave dated back to the 12th century and it was flanked by two 17th-century chapels. Due to population growth, a new building was planned in 1844 to replace its small predecessor, being covered by a subscription in 1862.

Built in the Romanesque Revival style by the architect Pierre-Aimé Renous, the foundation stone was laid in 1864 and the church was blessed in 1866. Acceptance of the work took place on 19 June 1868.

Its condition became a cause for concern in the 1980s, and on 16 May 2014, the church was closed to the public for safety reasons. The Miguel Storm tore off part of the roof of the church on 7 June 2019, causing the choir to collapse. A historical study about the site was carried out in 2021. The cost to the municipality, which owns the church, to restore it was deemed too high, 6 million euros for a complete renovation, 4 million for restoration of the transepts and apses and 1.4 million for the bell tower.

On 21 January 2023 the mayor announced the decision to demolish the church following a decree of deconsecration issued by the Bishop of Laval. On 30 January, this decision was unanimously approved by the town council. However, it was opposed by heritage associations and the inhabitants of the town.

Demolition began on 31 July 2023 and was concluded one week later.

A small part of the frontal façade and the outline of the church were kept but the site is still vacant.
