= Château Grand'Grange =

Château Grand'Grange, established in 1842, is a vineyard situated close to Mont Brouilly in Beaujolais, 30 kilometres (19 mi) north-west of Lyon, near the village of Le Perréon. Château Grand'Grange is entitled to use the appellation Beaujolais Villages and Fleurie.

== History ==
The land of the vineyard originally belonged to the Baron in Vaux. However, the Baron was beheaded during the French revolution in 1789. In 1810, Napoleon ennobled one of his followers as Baron de Vauxonne and he took over possession of the land. When the Baron died in 1837, his son Emile inherited the land and in 1842, he built the castle of sturdy granite rocks.

Several suggestions for names for the vineyard were brought up, but a younger brother had inherited the nearby vineyard, Le Petit Grange (the small barn), and Emile consequently named the vineyard after the 60-metre (196.85 feet) long barn that today houses the entire wine production, Château Grand'Grange (the large barn). Presently, the estate is 20 ha, of which 13 ha is vineyard.

== Vineyard ==
Château Grand'Grange produces app. 12,500 bottles of wine annually, including three red wines, one white wine and a rosé. The three red wines comprises the cru wine, Fleurie, Clos de la Madone, Monopole, 3,000 bottles, and the two Beaujolais Villages wines Château Grand'Grange, La Tour 2,300, and Château Grand'Grange, La Cascade, 17,000h.

Château Grand'Grange, La Tour and La Cascade, 2009, was awarded the Prix d'Excellence (Silver) by Vinalies, Oenologues de France. Château Grand'Grange, La Tour, 2009, was awarded Médaille de Bronze by Concours des Grands vins du Beaujolais. Château Grand'Grange, La Cascade, 2009, was awarded Médaille de Bronze by Comité des Salons, Concours & Foire Nationale des vins à Macon.
