= Blacé =

- Commune
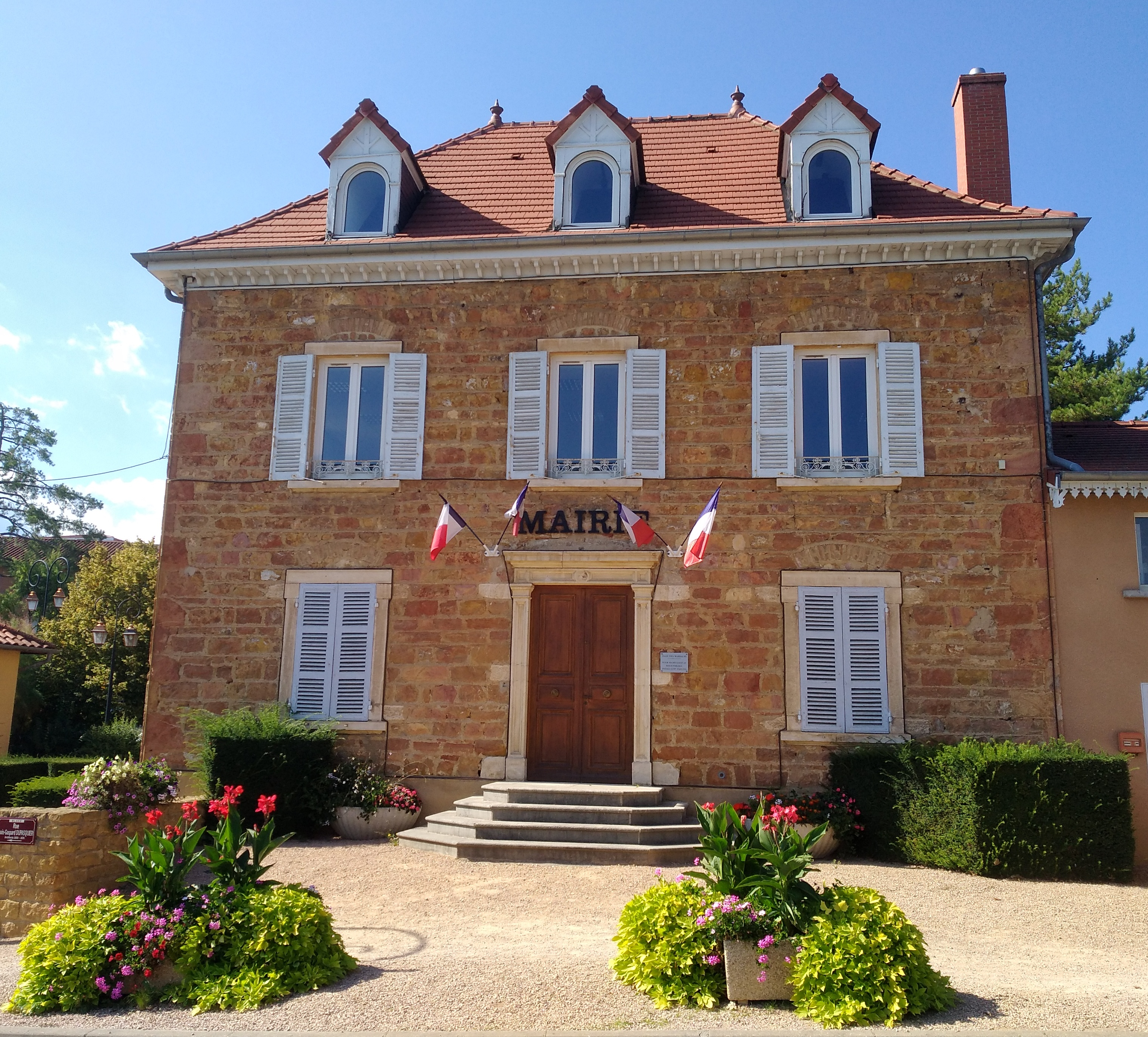
- Townhall
- Location of Blacé
- Location within France Location within Auvergne-Rhône-Alpes
- Coordinates: 46°01′56″N 4°38′43″E
- Country: France
- Region: Auvergne-Rhône-Alpes
- Department: Rhône
- Arrondissement: Villefranche-sur-Saône
- Canton: Gleizé
- Intercommunality: CA Villefranche Beaujolais Saône

Government
  - Mayor (2020–2026): Fabrice Longefay
- Area^{1}: 11 km^{2} (4.2 sq mi)
- Elevation: 250 m (820 ft)
- Highest elevation: 732 m (2,402 ft)
- Lowest elevation: 218 m (715 ft)
- Population (2023): 1,715
  - Density: 160/km^{2} (400/sq mi)
- Time zone: UTC+01:00 (CET)
  - Summer (DST): UTC+02:00 (CEST)
- INSEE/Postal code: 69023 /69460
- ^{1} French Land Register data, which excludes lakes, ponds, glaciers > 1 km^{2} (0.386 sq mi or 247 acres) and river estuaries.

Blacé (French pronunciation: [blase]) is a commune of the Rhône department in eastern France. It was the retirement home of Adolphe Valette.

== See also ==
Communes of the Rhône department
