= Rivolet =

- Commune
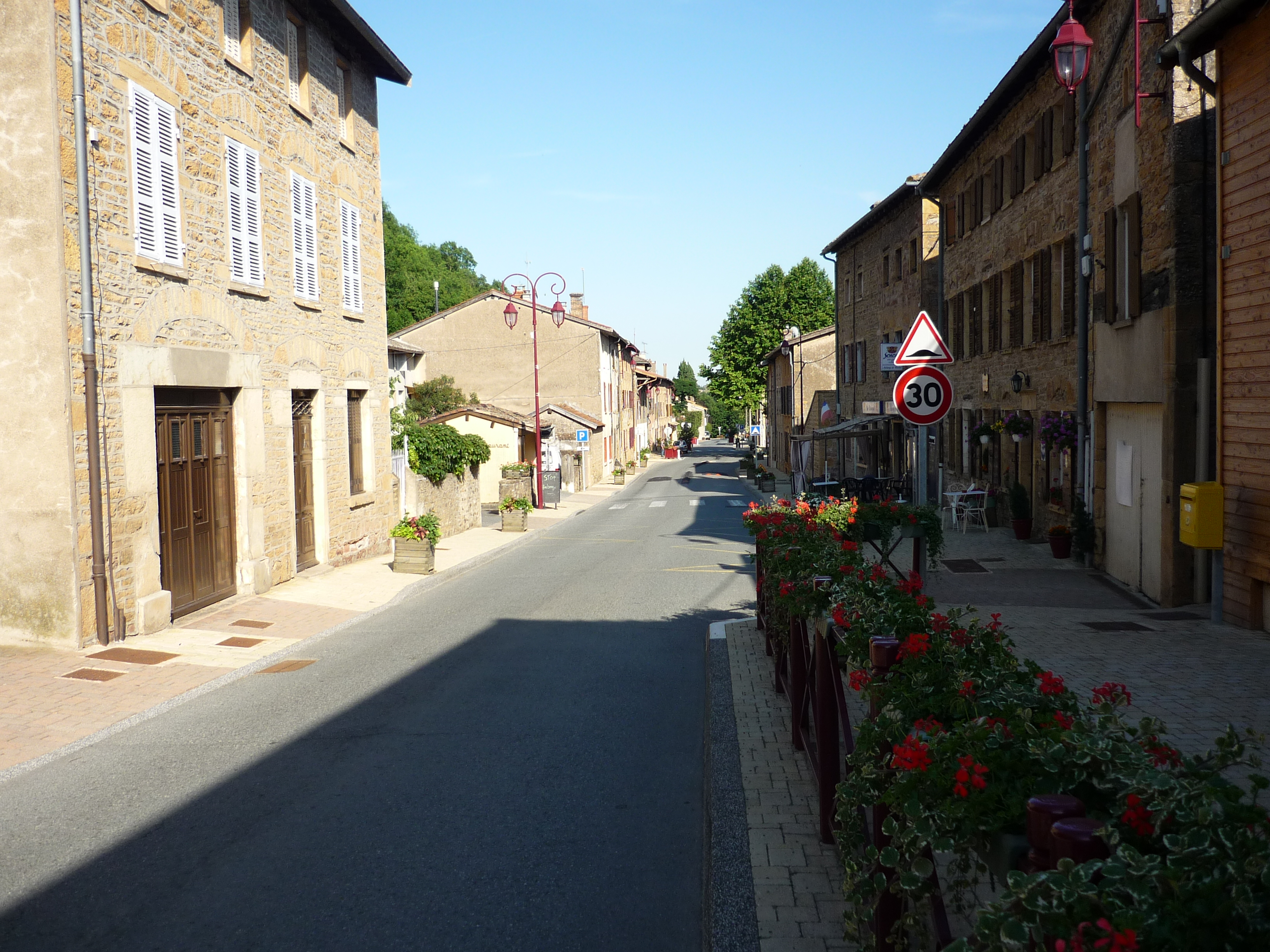
- The D504 road in Rivolet
- Location of Rivolet
- Location within France Location within Auvergne-Rhône-Alpes
- Coordinates: 46°00′24″N 4°36′10″E
- Country: France
- Region: Auvergne-Rhône-Alpes
- Department: Rhône
- Arrondissement: Villefranche-sur-Saône
- Canton: Gleizé
- Intercommunality: CA Villefranche Beaujolais Saône

Government
  - Mayor (2022–2026): Catherine Butet
- Area^{1}: 16.3 km^{2} (6.3 sq mi)
- Elevation: 330 m (1,080 ft)
- Highest elevation: 866 m (2,841 ft)
- Lowest elevation: 296 m (971 ft)
- Population (2023): 585
  - Density: 35.9/km^{2} (93.0/sq mi)
- Time zone: UTC+01:00 (CET)
  - Summer (DST): UTC+02:00 (CEST)
- INSEE/Postal code: 69167 /69640
- ^{1} French Land Register data, which excludes lakes, ponds, glaciers > 1 km^{2} (0.386 sq mi or 247 acres) and river estuaries.

Rivolet (French pronunciation: [ʁivɔlɛ]) is a commune in the Rhône department in eastern France.

== See also ==
- Communes of the Rhône department
