= Denicé =

- Commune
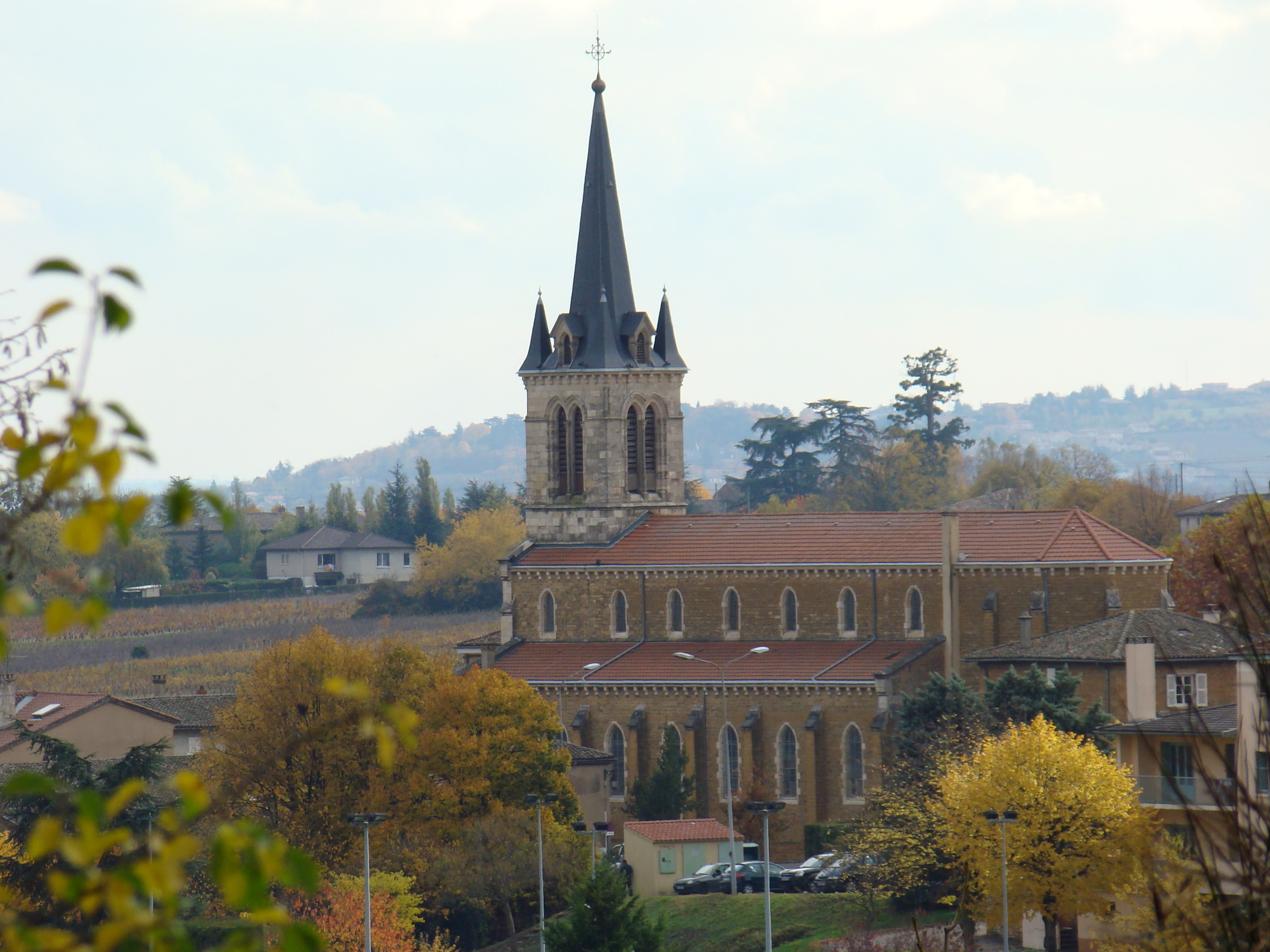
- The church in Denicé
- Location of Denicé
- Location within France Location within Auvergne-Rhône-Alpes
- Coordinates: 46°00′09″N 4°38′46″E
- Country: France
- Region: Auvergne-Rhône-Alpes
- Department: Rhône
- Arrondissement: Villefranche-sur-Saône
- Canton: Gleizé
- Intercommunality: CA Villefranche Beaujolais Saône

Government
  - Mayor (2020–2026): Jacques Tournier
- Area^{1}: 9.53 km^{2} (3.68 sq mi)
- Elevation: 220 m (720 ft)
- Highest elevation: 393 m (1,289 ft)
- Lowest elevation: 215 m (705 ft)
- Population (2023): 1,571
  - Density: 165/km^{2} (427/sq mi)
- Time zone: UTC+01:00 (CET)
  - Summer (DST): UTC+02:00 (CEST)
- INSEE/Postal code: 69074 /69640
- ^{1} French Land Register data, which excludes lakes, ponds, glaciers > 1 km^{2} (0.386 sq mi or 247 acres) and river estuaries.

Denicé (French pronunciation: [dənise]) is a commune in the Rhône department in eastern France.

== Twins cities ==
- (Germany) Hallgarten (1986)

== See also ==
- Communes of the Rhône department
