= Saint-Julien, Rhône =

Saint-Julien
- Commune
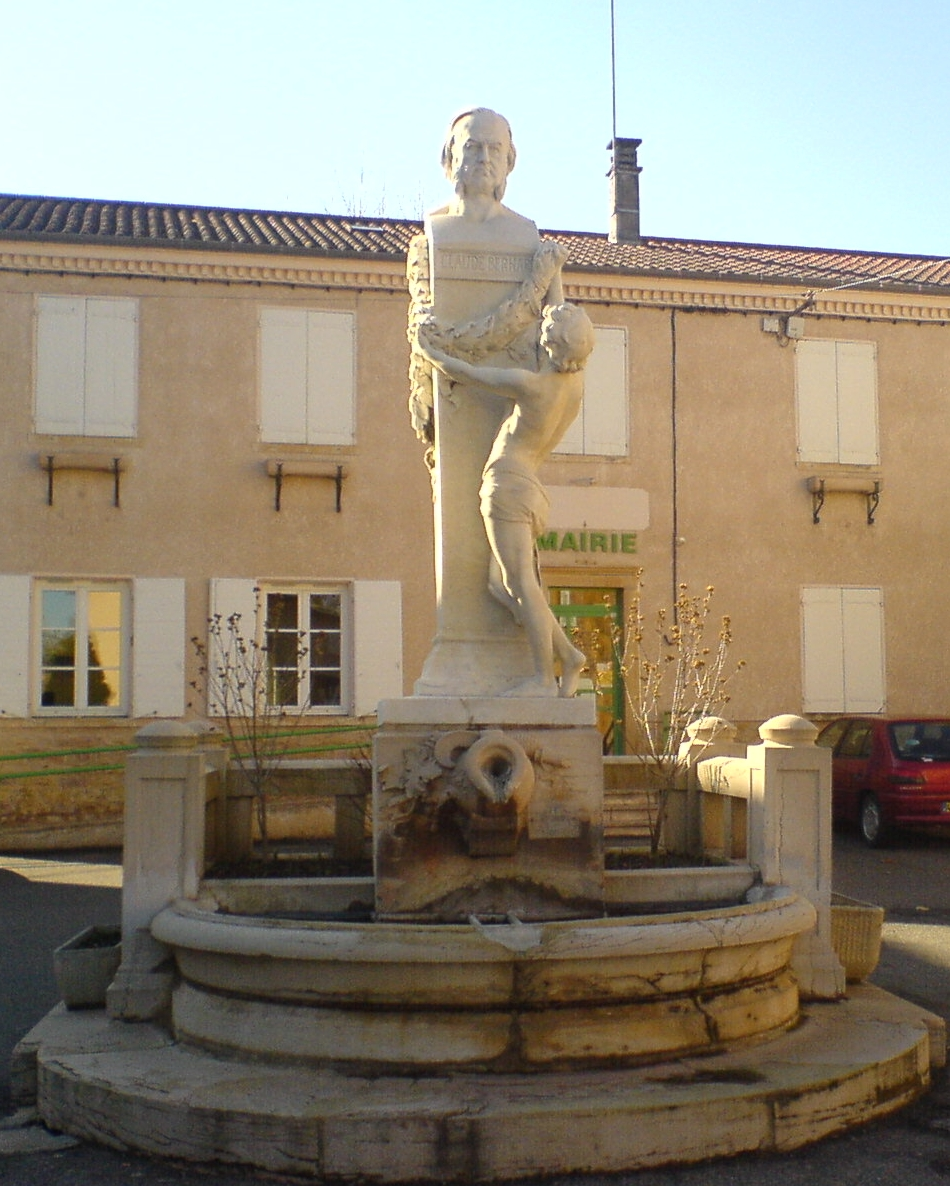
- The bust of Claude Bernard in the central square
- Location of Saint-Julien
- Location within France Location within Auvergne-Rhône-Alpes
- Coordinates: 46°01′38″N 4°39′11″E
- Country: France
- Region: Auvergne-Rhône-Alpes
- Department: Rhône
- Arrondissement: Villefranche-sur-Saône
- Canton: Gleizé
- Intercommunality: CA Villefranche Beaujolais Saône

Government
  - Mayor (2020–2026): Nathalie Petrozzi-Bedanian
- Area^{1}: 6.89 km^{2} (2.66 sq mi)
- Elevation: 250 m (820 ft)
- Highest elevation: 502 m (1,647 ft)
- Lowest elevation: 204 m (669 ft)
- Population (2023): 969
  - Density: 141/km^{2} (364/sq mi)
- Time zone: UTC+01:00 (CET)
  - Summer (DST): UTC+02:00 (CEST)
- INSEE/Postal code: 69215 /69640
- ^{1} French Land Register data, which excludes lakes, ponds, glaciers > 1 km^{2} (0.386 sq mi or 247 acres) and river estuaries.

Saint-Julien (French pronunciation: [sɛ̃ ʒyljɛ̃]) is a commune in the Rhône department in eastern France.

== Notable person ==
Claude Bernard (1813–1878), physiologist, was born in Saint-Julien

== See also ==
- Communes of the Rhône department
