= Saint-Georges-de-Reneins =

- Commune
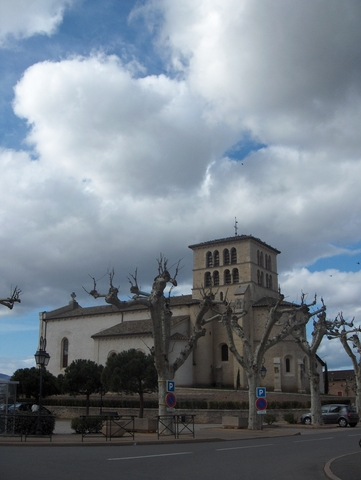
- The church in Saint-Georges-de-Reneins
- Location of Saint-Georges-de-Reneins
- Location within France Location within Auvergne-Rhône-Alpes
- Coordinates: 46°03′46″N 4°43′21″E
- Country: France
- Region: Auvergne-Rhône-Alpes
- Department: Rhône
- Arrondissement: Villefranche-sur-Saône
- Canton: Gleizé

Government
  - Mayor (2020–2026): Patrick Baghdassarian
- Area^{1}: 27.49 km^{2} (10.61 sq mi)
- Elevation: 221 m (725 ft)
- Highest elevation: 244 m (801 ft)
- Lowest elevation: 167 m (548 ft)
- Population (2023): 4,677
  - Density: 170.1/km^{2} (440.6/sq mi)
- Time zone: UTC+01:00 (CET)
  - Summer (DST): UTC+02:00 (CEST)
- INSEE/Postal code: 69206 /69830
- ^{1} French Land Register data, which excludes lakes, ponds, glaciers > 1 km^{2} (0.386 sq mi or 247 acres) and river estuaries.

Saint-Georges-de-Reneins (French pronunciation: [sɛ̃ ʒɔʁʒ də ʁənɛ̃]) is a commune in the Rhône department in eastern France. It is part of the canton of Gleizé and the arrondissement of Villefranche-sur-Saône.

== Geography ==
The altitude of the commune of Saint-Georges-de-Reneins ranges between 167 and 244 meters. The area of the commune is 27.49 km^{2}. The town lies 35 km north of Lyon and 8 km south of Villefranche-sur-Saône.

== Population ==
Historical population
Year	Pop.	±% p.a.
1968	2,709	—
1975	2,982	+1.38%
1982	3,189	+0.96%
1990	3,509	+1.20%
1999	3,832	+0.98%
2007	4,135	+0.96%
2012	4,292	+0.75%
2017	4,378	+0.40%
2023	4,677	+1.11%
Source: INSEE

== See also ==
- Communes of the Rhône department
