= Gémozac =

- Commune
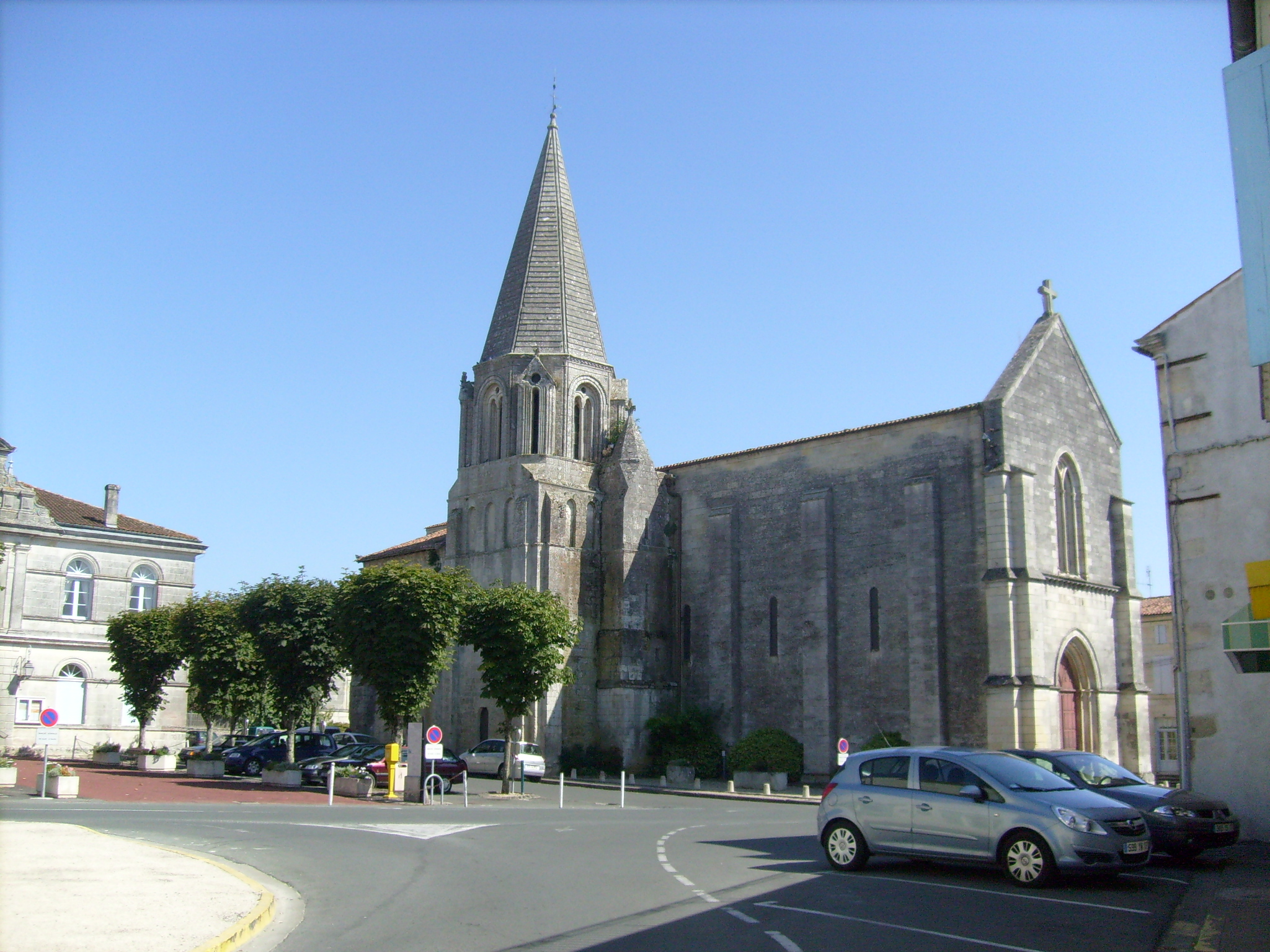
- The church of Saint-Pierre in Gémozac

- Coat of arms
- Location of Gémozac
- Location within France Location within Nouvelle-Aquitaine
- Coordinates: 45°34′11″N 0°40′29″W
- Country: France
- Region: Nouvelle-Aquitaine
- Department: Charente-Maritime
- Arrondissement: Saintes
- Canton: Saintonge Estuaire
- Intercommunality: Gémozac et Saintonge Viticole

Government
  - Mayor (2020–2026): Loïc Girard
- Area^{1}: 31.93 km^{2} (12.33 sq mi)
- Highest elevation: 48 m (157 ft)
- Lowest elevation: 17 m (56 ft)
- Population (2023): 3,052
  - Density: 95.58/km^{2} (247.6/sq mi)
- Time zone: UTC+01:00 (CET)
  - Summer (DST): UTC+02:00 (CEST)
- INSEE/Postal code: 17172 /17260
- ^{1} French Land Register data, which excludes lakes, ponds, glaciers > 1 km^{2} (0.386 sq mi or 247 acres) and river estuaries.

Gémozac (French pronunciation: [ʒemozak]) is a commune in the Charente-Maritime department in southwestern France.

== Population ==
Historical population

| Year | Pop. | ±% p.a. |
|---|---|---|
| 1793 | 2,164 | — |
| 1800 | 2,403 | +1.51% |
| 1806 | 2,303 | −0.71% |
| 1821 | 2,461 | +0.44% |
| 1831 | 2,590 | +0.51% |
| 1836 | 2,607 | +0.13% |
| 1841 | 2,610 | +0.02% |
| 1846 | 2,663 | +0.40% |
| 1851 | 2,675 | +0.09% |
| 1856 | 2,626 | −0.37% |
| 1861 | 2,787 | +1.20% |
| 1866 | 2,792 | +0.04% |
| 1872 | 2,598 | −1.19% |
| 1876 | 2,709 | +1.05% |
| 1881 | 2,693 | −0.12% |
| 1886 | 2,578 | −0.87% |
| 1891 | 2,503 | −0.59% |
| 1896 | 2,506 | +0.02% |
| 1901 | 2,625 | +0.93% |

| Year | Pop. | ±% p.a. |
|---|---|---|
| 1906 | 2,614 | −0.08% |
| 1911 | 2,621 | +0.05% |
| 1921 | 2,368 | −1.01% |
| 1926 | 2,444 | +0.63% |
| 1931 | 2,378 | −0.55% |
| 1936 | 2,358 | −0.17% |
| 1946 | 2,333 | −0.11% |
| 1954 | 2,152 | −1.00% |
| 1962 | 2,194 | +0.24% |
| 1968 | 2,236 | +0.32% |
| 1975 | 2,388 | +0.94% |
| 1982 | 2,381 | −0.04% |
| 1990 | 2,333 | −0.25% |
| 1999 | 2,352 | +0.09% |
| 2007 | 2,571 | +1.12% |
| 2012 | 2,799 | +1.71% |
| 2017 | 2,851 | +0.37% |
| 2023 | 3,052 | +1.14% |

Source: EHESS and INSEE (1968-2023)

== See also ==
- Communes of the Charente-Maritime department
