= Salles-Arbuissonnas-en-Beaujolais =

- Commune
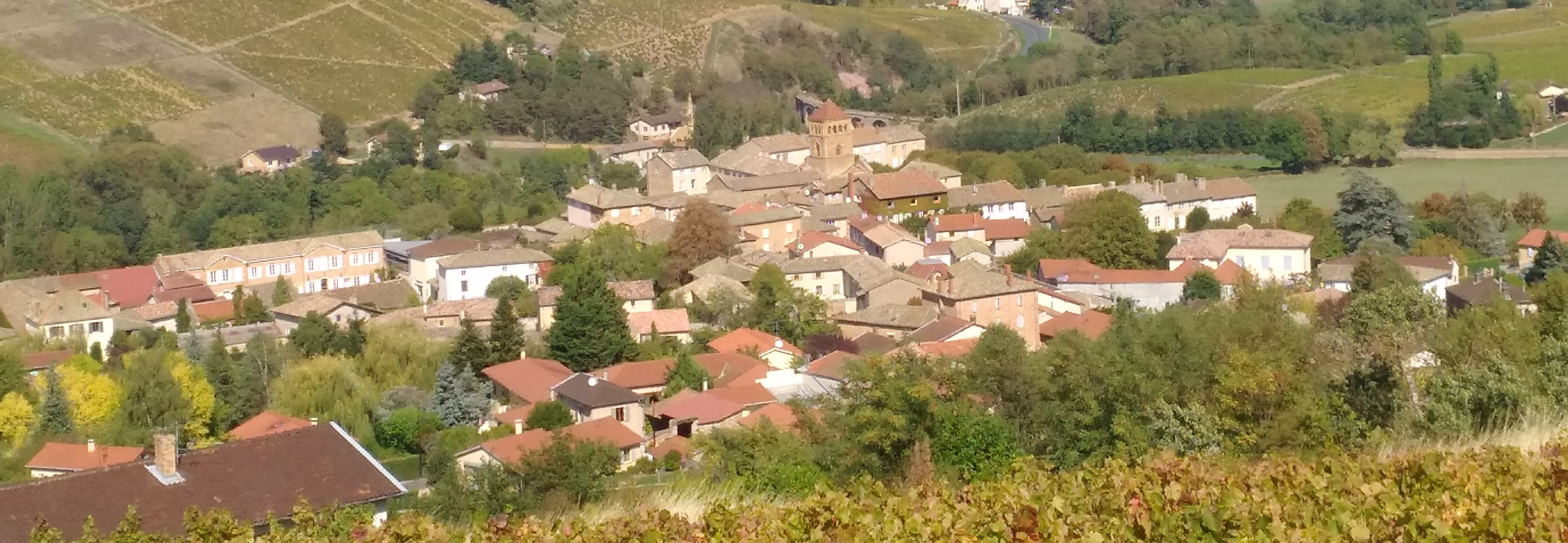
- View of the village.
- Location of Salles-Arbuissonnas-en-Beaujolais
- Location within France Location within Auvergne-Rhône-Alpes
- Coordinates: 46°02′29″N 4°38′04″E
- Country: France
- Region: Auvergne-Rhône-Alpes
- Department: Rhône
- Arrondissement: Villefranche-sur-Saône
- Canton: Gleizé
- Intercommunality: CA Villefranche Beaujolais Saône

Government
  - Mayor (2020–2026): Stéphane Parizot
- Area^{1}: 4.35 km^{2} (1.68 sq mi)
- Elevation: 300 m (980 ft)
- Highest elevation: 429 m (1,407 ft)
- Lowest elevation: 247 m (810 ft)
- Population (2023): 815
  - Density: 187/km^{2} (485/sq mi)
- Time zone: UTC+01:00 (CET)
  - Summer (DST): UTC+02:00 (CEST)
- INSEE/Postal code: 69172 /69460
- ^{1} French Land Register data, which excludes lakes, ponds, glaciers > 1 km^{2} (0.386 sq mi or 247 acres) and river estuaries.

Salles-Arbuissonnas-en-Beaujolais is a commune in the Rhône department in eastern France.

== See also ==
- Communes of the Rhône department
