= La Baconnière =

- Commune
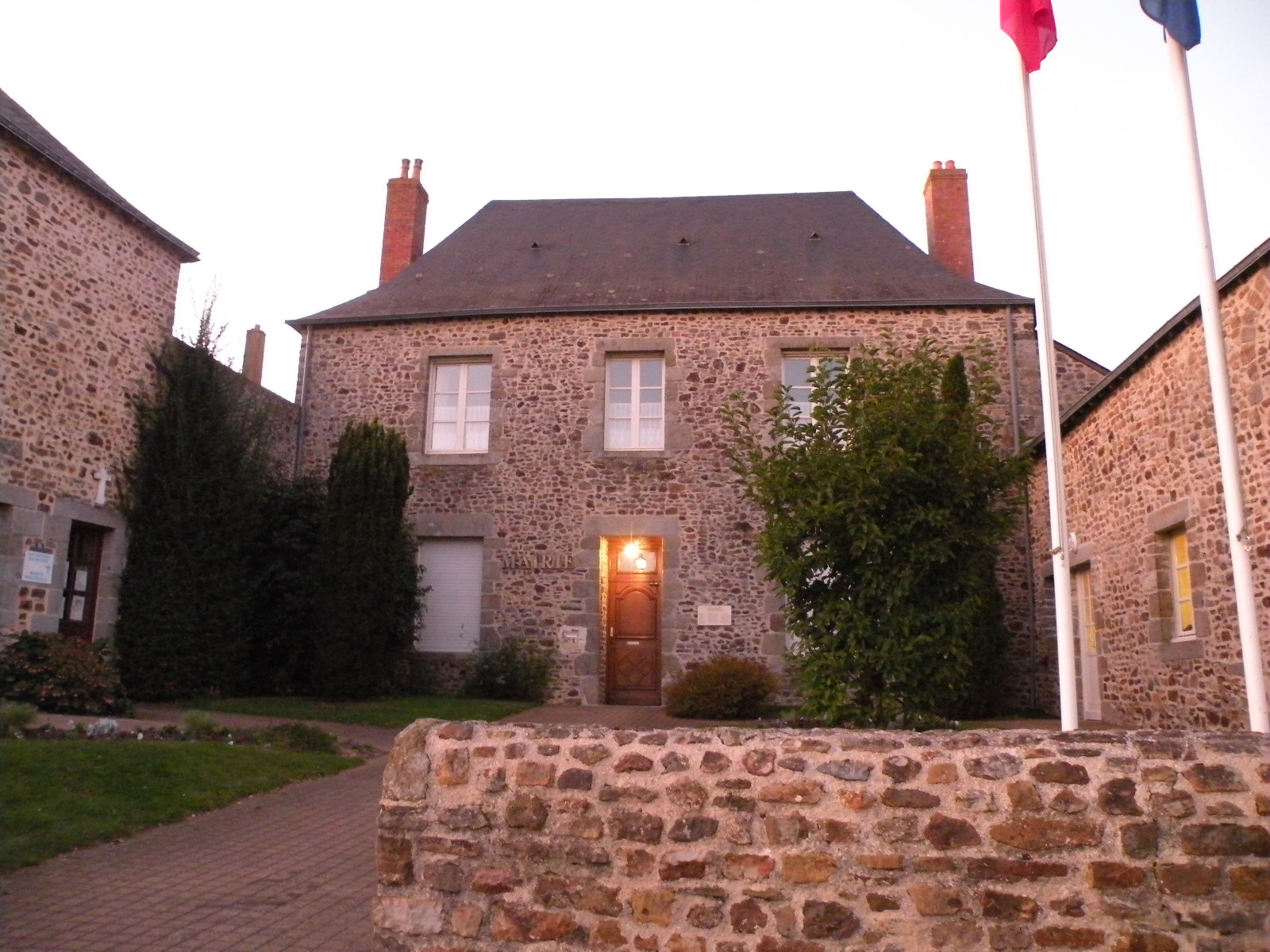
- The town hall in La Baconnière

- Coat of arms
- Location of La Baconnière
- Location within France Location within Pays de la Loire
- Coordinates: 48°11′02″N 0°53′31″W
- Country: France
- Region: Pays de la Loire
- Department: Mayenne
- Arrondissement: Mayenne
- Canton: Ernée

Government
  - Mayor (2020–2026): David Besneux
- Area^{1}: 27.36 km^{2} (10.56 sq mi)
- Elevation: 190 m (620 ft)
- Highest elevation: 199 m (653 ft)
- Lowest elevation: 83 m (272 ft)
- Population (2023): 1,965
  - Density: 71.82/km^{2} (186.0/sq mi)
- Time zone: UTC+01:00 (CET)
  - Summer (DST): UTC+02:00 (CEST)
- INSEE/Postal code: 53015 /53240
- ^{1} French Land Register data, which excludes lakes, ponds, glaciers > 1 km^{2} (0.386 sq mi or 247 acres) and river estuaries.

La Baconnière (French pronunciation: [la bakɔnjɛʁ]) is a commune in the Mayenne department in northwestern France.

== Population ==
Historical population
Year	Pop.	±% p.a.
1968	905	—
1975	875	−0.48%
1982	1,037	+2.46%
1990	1,152	+1.32%
1999	1,194	+0.40%
2007	1,491	+2.82%
2012	1,701	+2.67%
2017	1,923	+2.48%
2023	1,965	+0.36%
Source: INSEE

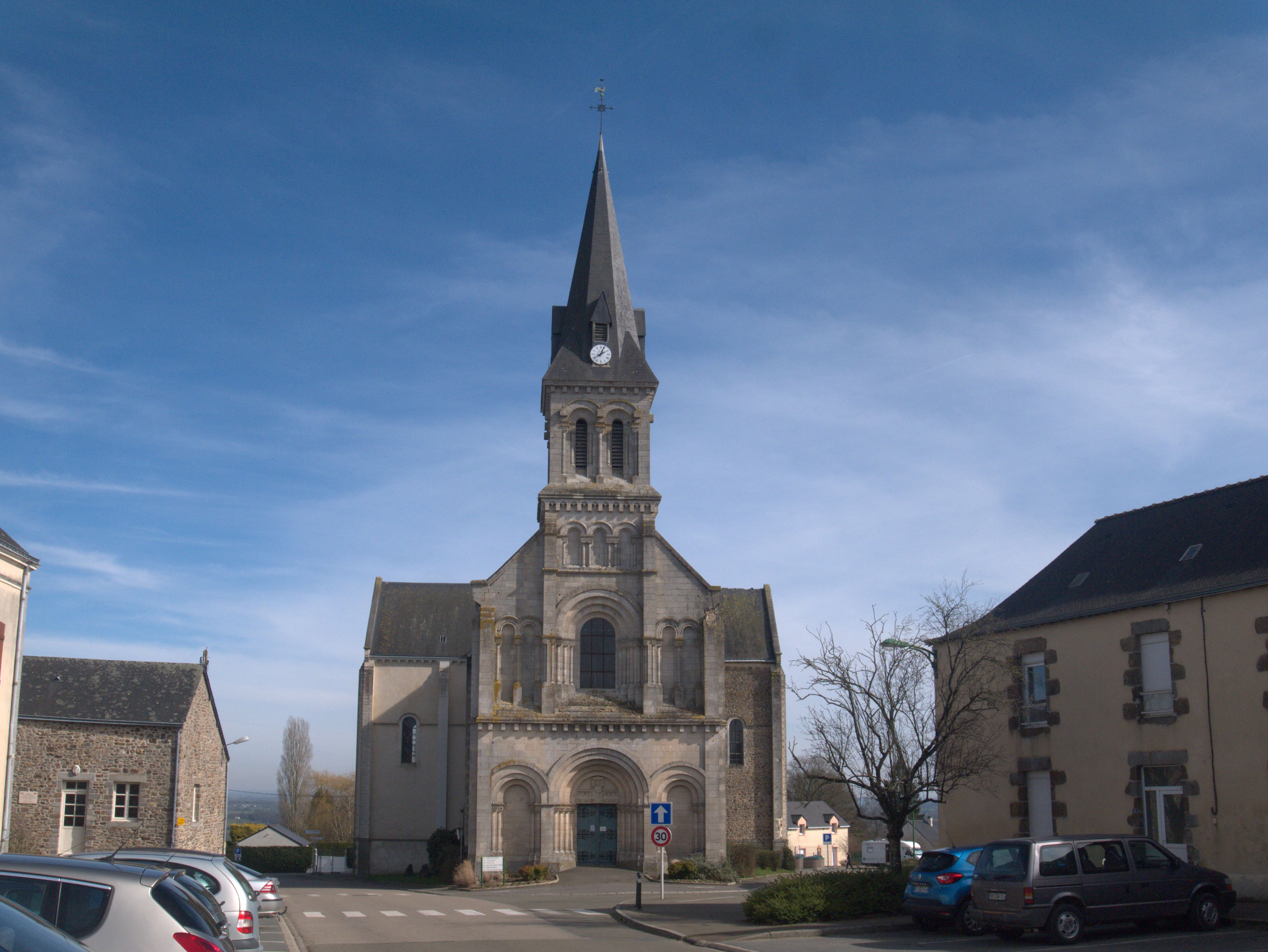
Église Saint-Corneille-et-Saint-Cyprien de La Baconnière

== See also ==
- Communes of Mayenne
