= World Climbing Youth Championship =

Annual international climbing competition

- Status: active
- Genre: sporting event
- Date: mid-year
- Frequency: annual
- Country: varying
- Inaugurated: 1992

The World Climbing Youth Championship, known until 2025 as the IFSC Youth World Championships, is an annual world championship competition for youth competition climbers organized by World Climbing. The championship includes separate men's and women's events in boulder, lead and speed in the U17 and U19 age groups.

The first competition was held in Basel, Switzerland, in 1992. Speed climbing was introduced in 2001, while bouldering was added in 2015. A combined classification was contested at selected editions between 2015 and 2022.

== Structure ==
The championship is contested in three disciplines:

- Boulder
- Lead
- Speed

Since 2025, competitors have been divided into two age groups:

- U17, generally comprising athletes who turn 15 or 16 during the calendar year
- U19, generally comprising athletes who turn 17 or 18 during the calendar year

Eligibility is determined by the athlete's year of birth rather than their age on the date of the competition. World Climbing also recognizes a U21 youth category, but it is not included in the World Climbing Youth Championship. Before 2025, the championship used three divisions: Junior or U20, Youth A or U18, and Youth B or U16.

== Championships ==
Edition	Year	Location	Date(s)	Disciplines				Notes	Results
Edition	Year	Location	Date(s)	L	S	B	C	Notes	Results
1	1992	(Switzerland) Basel	27 February 1992	X	-	-	-		
2	1994	(Germany) Leipzig	22 October 1994	X	-	-	-		
3	1995	(France) Laval	6 October 1995	X	-	-	-		
4	1996	(Russia) Moscow	1996	X	-	-	-	-	-
5	1997	(Austria) Imst	14 November 1997	X	-	-	-		
6	1998	(Russia) Moscow	16 July 1998	X	-	-	-		
7	1999	(Italy) Courmayeur	3 September 1999	X	-	-	-		
8	2000	(Netherlands) Amsterdam	1 September 2000	X	-	-	-		
9	2001	(Austria) Imst	21–24 June 2001	X	X	-	-		
10	2002	(France) Canteleu	28 September 2002	X	X	-	-		
11	2003	(Bulgaria) Veliko Tarnovo	19–21 September 2003	X	-	-	-		
12	2004	(United Kingdom) Edinburgh	10–12 September 2004	X	-	-	-		
13	2005	(China) Beijing	25 August 2005	X	X	-	-		
14	2006	(Austria) Imst	24–27 August 2006	X	X	-	-		
15	2007	(Ecuador) Ibarra	23–26 August 2007	X	X	-	-		
16	2008	(Australia) Sydney	28–31 August 2008	X	X	-	-		
17	2009	(France) Valence	27–30 August 2009	X	X	-	-		
18	2010	(United Kingdom) Edinburgh	9–12 September 2010	X	X	-	-		
19	2011	(Austria) Imst	25–28 August 2011	X	X	-	-		
20	2012	Singapore	29 August – 1 September 2012	X	X	-	-		
21	2013	(Canada) Central Saanich	15–19 August 2013	X	X	-	-		
22	2014	(France) Nouméa, New Caledonia	19–23 September 2014	X	X	-	-		
23	2015	(Italy) Arco	28 August – 6 September 2015	X	X	X	X		
24	2016	(China) Guangzhou	7–13 November 2016	X	X	X	X		
25	2017	(Austria) Innsbruck	30 August – 10 September 2017	X	X	X	X		
26	2018	(Russia) Moscow	9–16 August 2018	X	X	-	-		
29	2019	(Italy) Arco	22–31 August 2019	X	X	X	X		
	2020	Not held	-	-	-	-	-	-	-
30	2021	(Russia) Voronezh	20–31 August 2021	X	X	X	X		
31	2022	(United States) Dallas	22–31 August 2022	X	X	X	-		
32	2023	(South Korea) Seoul	18–27 August 2023	X	X	X	-		
33	2024	(China) Guiyang	22–31 August 2024	X	X	X	-		
34	2025	(Finland) Helsinki	28 July - 3 August 2025	X	X	X	-		
35	2026	(Italy) Arco	18 - 25 July 2026	X	X	X	-		
36	2027	(India) Jamshedpur	21 - 28 November 2027	X	X	X	-		

== Male results ==
=== Lead ===
==== Juniors ====
Year	Gold	Silver	Bronze
1992	(Russia) Pavel Samoiline	(France) Faycal Natech	(Switzerland) Elie Chevieux (United Kingdom) Ian Vickers
1994	(France) Fabien Mazuer (France) François Petit	-	(Switzerland) Pascal Gisler
1995	(Belgium) Frederic Sarkany	(Germany) Christian Bindhammer	(Bulgaria) Kalin Garbov
1997	(Ukraine) Maksym Petrenko	(France) Sylvain Millet	(Austria) Thomas Feuerstein
1998	(France) Yves Hasbani	(France) Jérôme Meyer	(Switzerland) David Gisler
1999	(Italy) Flavio Crespi	(France) Yves Hasbani	(Spain) Patxi Usobiaga Lakunza
2000	(Spain) Pablo Barbero Alfonso	(Ukraine) Mykhaylo Shalagin	(Canada) Nels Rosaasen
2001	(Czech Republic) Tomáš Mrázek	(Austria) Kilian Fischhuber	(South Korea) Sangwon Son
2002	(Switzerland) Cédric Lachat	(France) Gérome Pouvreau	(France) Fabien Dugit
2003	(Spain) Eduard Marin Garcia	(Netherlands) Jorg Verhoeven	(France) Fabien Dugit
2004	(Netherlands) Jorg Verhoeven	(Spain) Eduard Marin Garcia	(Russia) Dmitrii Sharafutdinov
2005	(Switzerland) Daniel Winkler	(France) Nicolas Badia	(Russia) Ivan Kaurov
2006	(Canada) Sean McColl	(Austria) Thomas Neyer	(France) Fabien Comina
2007	(Japan) Sachi Amma	(Germany) Felix Neumärker	(Japan) Tsukuru Hori
2008	(Austria) Jakob Schubert	(South Korea) Hyunbin Min	(Czech Republic) Martin Stráník
2009	(Austria) Jakob Schubert	(France) Gautier Supper	(Spain) Eric Lopez Mateos
2010	(Germany) Thomas Tauporn	(Austria) Mario Lechner	(Ukraine) Anton Mardashov
2011	(Slovenia) Jure Raztresen	(United Kingdom) Edward Hamer	(Italy) Stefano Ghisolfi
2012	(Russia) Dmitrii Fakirianov	(Slovenia) Domen Škofic	(Slovenia) Jure Raztresen
2013	(Russia) Dmitrii Fakirianov	(Germany) Sebastian Halenke	(Slovenia) Domen Škofic
2014	(Austria) Bernhard Röck	(Belgium) Loïc Timmermans	(Slovenia) Martin Bergant
2015	(Austria) Bernhard Röck	(United States) Jesse Grupper	(Japan) Keiichiro Korenaga
2016	(Belgium) Simon Lorenzi	(Japan) Yuki Hada	(Switzerland) Dimitri Vogt
2017	(Japan) Yoshiyuki Ogata	(Japan) Meichi Narasaki	(United States) Kai Lightner
2018	(Japan) Meichi Narasaki	(Czech Republic) Jakub Konečný	(Japan) Kai Harada
2019	(Japan) Shuta Tanaka	(Japan) Sohta Amagasa	(France) Alistair Duval
2021	(United Kingdom) Hamish McArthur	(France) Paul Jenft	(Japan) Rei Kawamata
2022	(Japan) Zento Murashita	(Japan) Junta Sekiguchi	(Slovenia) Lovro Črep
2023	(Belgium) Hannes Van Duysen	(Japan) Neo Suzuki	(Japan) Zento Murashita
2024	(Japan) Yusuke Sugimoto	(Romania) Darius Rapa	(Japan) Shion Omata

==== Youth A ====
Year	Gold	Silver	Bronze
1992	(France) François Petit	(France) Fabien Mazuer	(France) Antoine Pecher
1994	(Spain) David Carretero Perez	(France) Anthony Lamiche (Germany) Robert Mate (Ukraine) Maksym Petrenko	-
1995	(France) Sylvain Millet	(France) Frédéric Tuscan	(Germany) Markus Bock
1997	(France) Julien Barbier	(France) Yves Hasbani	(France) François Auclair
1998	(Austria) Alexander Meikl	(Germany) Peter Szczepanski	(Ukraine) Mykhaylo Shalagin
1999	(Slovenia) Tomaz Valjavec	(Ukraine) Mykhaylo Shalagin	(Austria) Kilian Fischhuber
2000	(Switzerland) Roman Felix	(France) Fabien Dugit	(France) Gérome Pouvreau
2001	(Poland) Marcin Wszolek	(Netherlands) Jorg Verhoeven	(Czech Republic) Petr Solansky
2002	(Netherlands) Jorg Verhoeven	(France) Flavien Guerimand	(France) Christophe Treuilhe
2003	(Canada) Sean McColl	(Switzerland) Anthony Sapey	(France) Romain Pagnoux
2004	(Canada) Sean McColl	(Russia) Ivan Kaurov	(France) Fabien Comina
2005	(Norway) Magnus Midtbø	(Germany) Felix Neumärker	(Japan) Sachi Amma
2006	(Japan) Sachi Amma	(Austria) Jakob Schubert	(Austria) David Lama
2007	(Austria) Jakob Schubert	(Austria) Mario Lechner	(Germany) Thomas Tauporn
2008	(Austria) Mario Lechner	(Germany) Thomas Tauporn	(Spain) Eric Lopez Mateos
2009	(Czech Republic) Adam Ondra	(Austria) Max Rudigier	(United States) Julian Bautista
2010	(Slovenia) Jure Raztresen	(Germany) Alexander Megos	(Italy) Stefano Ghisolfi
2011	(Slovenia) Domen Škofic	(Russia) Dmitrii Fakirianov	(Belgium) Loïc Timmermans
2012	(Germany) Sebastian Halenke	(Russia) Semen Chesnokov	(Slovenia) Martin Bergant
2013	(Japan) Naoki Shimatani	(Japan) Shinichiro Nomura	(Austria) Bernhard Röck
2014	(Sweden) Hannes Puman	(Austria) Jan-Luca Posch	(Austria) Georg Parma
2015	(Switzerland) Sascha Lehmann	(Italy) Stefano Carnati	(France) Hugo Parmentier
2016	(Italy) Giorgio Bendazzoli	(United States) Kai Lightner	(Japan) Taito Nakagami
2017	(Japan) Shuta Tanaka	(France) Nathan Martin	(Spain) Mikel Asier Linacisoro Molina
2018	(Japan) Hidemasa Nishida	(Slovenia) Luka Potočar	(Japan) Katsura Konishi
2019	(Japan) Hidemasa Nishida	(United States) Colin Duffy	(Spain) Alberto Ginés López
2021	(Japan) Haruki Uemura	(France) Mejdi Schalck	(Slovenia) Timotej Romšak
2022	(Japan) Sorato Anraku	(United Kingdom) Toby Roberts	(Japan) Rikuto Inohana
2023	(South Korea) Kwon Ki-beom	(Japan) Shion Omata	(Thailand) Auswin Aueareechit
2024	(Japan) Manato Kurashiki	(South Korea) Hakjin Lee	(Japan) Haru Funaki

==== Youth B ====
Year	Gold	Silver	Bronze
1992	(Belgium) Laurent Lanners	(Italy) Olaw Mainardi	(France) Jimmy Dubuisson
1994	(France) Frédéric Tuscan	(Germany) Ulrich Lindenthal	(United States) David Hume
1995	(United States) Chris Sharma	(United States) David Hume	(United States) Matt Engbring
1997	(Slovenia) Klemen Becan	(United States) Eric Scully	(Slovenia) Tomaz Valjavec
1998	(Switzerland) Roman Felix	(France) Clément Chabaud	(Germany) Timo Preußler
1999	(Switzerland) Roman Felix	(United States) Adam Stack	(France) Remi Samyn
2000	(France) Guillaume Glairon Mondet	(United States) Ethan Pringle	(Netherlands) Jorg Verhoeven
2001	(France) Guillaume Glairon Mondet	(Austria) Helmut Wörz	(Czech Republic) Jan Zbranek
2002	(Italy) Gabriele Moroni	(Czech Republic) Štěpán Stráník	(South Korea) Jabee Kim
2003	(France) Fabien Comina	(United States) Daniel Woods	(Slovenia) Ales Jurjec
2004	(Austria) David Lama	(Bulgaria) Blagovest Lazarov	(United States) Daniel Woods
2005	(Austria) David Lama	(Austria) Jakob Schubert	(Ukraine) Yuriy Dzyubyak
2006	(Spain) Eric Lopez Mateos	(Russia) Arman Ter-Minasyan	(Austria) Mario Lechner
2007	(Czech Republic) Adam Ondra	(Japan) Masahiro Higuchi	(Austria) Max Rudigier
2008	(Czech Republic) Adam Ondra	(Austria) Max Rudigier	(United States) Julian Bautista
2009	(Germany) Sebastian Halenke	(Slovenia) Domen Škofic	(Germany) Samuel Adolph
2010	(Germany) Sebastian Halenke	(Belgium) Loïc Timmermans	(Germany) David Firnenburg
2011	(Austria) Bernhard Röck	(Japan) Naoki Shimatani	(Japan) Keiichiro Korenaga
2012	(Slovenia) Anze Peharc	(Sweden) Hannes Puman	(Austria) Georg Parma
2013	(Italy) Stefano Carnati	(France) Hugo Parmentier	(Switzerland) Sascha Lehmann
2014	(United States) Kai Lightner	(United States) Rudolph Ruana	(South Korea) Minyoung Lee
2015	(France) Sam Avezou	(Belgium) Harold Peeters	(Italy) Pietro Biagini
2016	(France) Sam Avezou	(Japan) Katsura Konishi	(Japan) Hidemasa Nishida
2017	(United States) Colin Duffy	(Spain) Alberto Ginés López	(Japan) Hidemasa Nishida
2018	(United States) Colin Duffy	(Austria) Thomas Podolan	(Japan) Kentaro Maeda
2019	(Japan) Junta Sekiguchi	(Japan) Haruki Uemura	(Japan) Satone Yoshida
2021	(Japan) Sorato Anraku	(United States) Hugo Hoyer	(United States) Dillon Countryman
2022	(France) Max Bertone	(Japan) Riku Ishihara	(Czech Republic) Lukas Mokrolusky
2023	(Japan) Ryusei Hamada	(Japan) Hareru Nagamori	(Japan) Ryota Toda
2024	(South Korea) Chanjin Jung	(Japan) Ryusei Hamada	(South Korea) Taesaung Park

==== U19 ====
Year	Gold	Silver	Bronze
2025	(Japan) Manato Kurashiki	(Czech Republic) Lukas Mokrolusky	(Japan) Hareru Nagamori
2026	(South Korea) Chanjin Jung	(Italy) Andrea Ludovico Chelleris	(Japan) Ryusei Hamada

==== U17 ====
Year	Gold	Silver	Bronze
2025	(Japan) Ryusei Hamada	(Japan) Kazuki Nakata	(South Korea) Jungbin Choi
2026	(Japan) Kazuki Nakata	(South Korea) Hayool Lee	(Japan) Taketo Saiki

=== Speed ===
==== Juniors ====
Year	Gold	Silver	Bronze
2001	(Ukraine) Maksym Styenkovyy	(Russia) Daniil Koźmine	(Ukraine) Oleksandr Salimov
2002	(Russia) Sergei Sinitcyn	(Ukraine) Oleksandr Salimov	(Ukraine) Dmytro Babich
2005	(Russia) Evgenii Vaitsekhovskii	(Russia) Alexander Kosterin	(Russia) Eduard Ismagilov
2006	(Canada) Sean McColl	(Russia) Anatoly Skripov	(Russia) Eduard Ismagilov
2007	(Ukraine) Maksym Osipov	(Russia) Egor Skachkov	(Russia) Sergey Kokorin
2008	(Russia) Sergey Abdrakhmanov	(Ukraine) Maksym Osipov	(China) QiXin Zhong
2009	(Russia) Sergey Abdrakhmanov	(Venezuela) Josmar Nieves	(Russia) Stanislav Kokorin
2010	(Kazakhstan) Sayat Bokanov	(Russia) Bogdan Posmashnyy	(Russia) Arman Ter-Minasyan
2011	(Ukraine) Danyil Boldyrev	(Poland) Marcin Dzieński	(Ukraine) Sergiy Barkovskyy
2012	(Russia) Nikita Suyushkin	(Russia) Dmitrii Timofeev	(Russia) Konstantin Payl
2013	(Russia) Nikita Suyushkin	(Russia) Artem Savelyev	(Russia) Sergei Luzhetskii
2014	(Czech Republic) Jan Kriz	(Russia) Sergei Luzhetskii	(Italy) Alessandro Santoni
2015	(Russia) Georgy Artamonov	(United States) John Brosler	(Russia) Maksim Diachkov
2016	(Italy) Ludovico Fossali	(France) Pierre Rebreyend	(Russia) Aleksandr Shikov
2017	(Ecuador) Carlos Granja	(South Korea) Seungbeom Lee	(United States) Michael Finn-Henry
2018	(Italy) Gian Luca Zodda	(United States) Noah Bratschi	(Russia) Demyan Zaytsev
2019	(Russia) Sergey Rukin	(Russia) Almaz Nagaev	(Indonesia) Rahmad Adi Mulyono
2021	(Russia) Iaroslav Pashkov	(Russia) Danila Ukolov	(Austria) Lawrence Bogeschdorfer
2022	(Japan) Shuto Fujino	(Ukraine) Hryhorii Ilchyshyn	(Germany) Leander Carmanns
2023	(New Zealand) Julian David	(United States) Micah Feller	(United Kingdom) Rafe Stokes
2024	(France) Jérôme Morel	(Poland) Oskar Szalecki	(China) Ziyu Zhou

==== Youth A ====
Year	Gold	Silver	Bronze
2001	(Germany) Johannes Lau	(Poland) Andrzej Mecherzyński-Wiktor	(Russia) Serguei Piniguine
2002	(Russia) Denis Omeltchenko	(Ukraine) Olexiy Shulga	(Russia) Dmitrii Sharafutdinov
2005	?	(Russia) Alexey Belchikov	(Ukraine) Olexiy Zaychenko
2006	(Ukraine) Maksym Osipov	(Russia) Egor Skachkov	(Ukraine) Yevgen Palladiy
2007	(Russia) Sergey Abdrakhmanov	(Ecuador) Gonzalo Mejia	(Ecuador) Andres Quinteros
2008	(Venezuela) Josmar Nieves	(Ecuador) Isaac Estevez	(United States) Nic Sutton
2009	(Italy) Leonardo Gontero	(Russia) Arman Ter-Minasyan	(Ecuador) Isaac Estevez
2010	(Russia) Viacheslav Vedenchuk	(Poland) Marcin Dzieński	(Ukraine) Yaroslav Gontaryk
2011	(Russia) Konstantin Payl	(Russia) Artem Savelyev	(Russia) Nikita Suyushkin
2012	(Russia) Ruslan Faizullin	(Russia) Sergei Luzhetskii	(Russia) Georgy Artamonov
2013	(Italy) Alessandro Santoni	(Russia) Aleksandr Shikov	(United States) John Brosler
2014	(Russia) Aleksandr Shikov	(Russia) Lev Rudatskiy	(Russia) Vladislav Myznikov
2015	(Ukraine) Kostiantyn Pavlenko	(Iran) Mehdi AliPourShenazandi	(Russia) Lev Rudatskiy
2016	(Italy) Gian Luca Zodda	(Russia) Sergei Rukin	(Russia) Georgii Morozov
2017	(Russia) Sergei Rukin	(Russia) Georgii Morozov	(China) JinXin Li
2018	(Russia) Almaz Nagaev	(United States) Jordan Fishman	(Russia) Eduard Daukaev
2019	(Russia) Iaroslav Pashkov	(United States) Jordan Fishman	(South Korea) Yongjun Jung
2021	(Russia) Maksim Ryzhov	(Ukraine) Hryhorii Ilchyshyn	(Italy) Marco Rontini
2022	(Italy) Marco Rontini	(France) Marius Payet Gaboriaud	(United States) Samuel Watson
2023	(United States) Michael Hom	(South Korea) Dong Jun Kim	(Japan) Kazuki Tanii
2024	(China) Shouhong Chu	(United States) Michael Hom	(Japan) Motonori Tabuchi

==== Youth B ====
Year	Gold	Silver	Bronze
2001	(Russia) Ivan Kalinine	(Ukraine) Olexiy Shulga	(Venezuela) Nestor Carvajal
2002	(Venezuela) Leonel De Las Salas (Canada) Sean McColl	-	(Russia) Vasily Kozlov
2005	(Russia) Alexander Stepanov	(Slovenia) Jernej Kruder	(Hungary) Bence Gál
2006	(Spain) Eric Lopez Mateos	(United States) Brian Furciniti	(United States) Brian Antheunisse
2007	(Russia) Andrey Shilenberg	(Russia) Bogdan Posmashnyy	(Ecuador) Isaac Estevez
2008	(Russia) Viacheslav Vedenchuk	(Russia) Ivan Spitsyn	(United States) Josh Levin
2009	(Russia) Nikita Suyushkin	(Russia) Artem Savelyev	(Russia) Sergei Luzhetskii
2010	(Russia) Georgy Artamonov	(Russia) Sergei Luzhetskii	(Italy) Alessandro Santoni
2011	(Russia) Ruslan Faizullin	(Russia) Georgy Artamonov	(Italy) Alessandro Santoni
2012	(Russia) Aleksandr Shikov	(Russia) Danil Zakirov	(Russia) Maksim Diachkov
2013	(Russia) Vladislav Myznikov	(Russia) Lev Rudatskiy	(Ukraine) Kostiantyn Pavlenko
2014	(Ecuador) Carlos Granja	(Russia) Petr Zemliakov	(Italy) Gian Luca Zodda
2015	(Russia) Petr Zemliakov	(Russia) Timur Yamaliev	(Italy) Leonardo Sandrin
2016	(Russia) Almaz Nagaev	(Russia) Roman Bozhko	(Russia) Danil Ogorodnikov
2017	(Italy) Jacopo Stefani	(Russia) Anton Kulba	(Russia) Evgeny Kuzin
2018	(South Korea) Haram Jeon	(Italy) Andrea Zappini	(United States) Ellis Ernsberger
2019	(Ukraine) Hryhorii Ilchyshyn	(United States) Oliver Kuang	(Canada) Dylan Le
2021	(Russia) Kirill Koldomov	(United States) Samuel Watson	(Japan) Yusuke Sugimoto
2022	(Italy) Francesco Ponzinibio	(Japan) Ginta Uegaki	(Kazakhstan) Damir Toktarov
2023	(China) Yicheng Zhao	(China) Jianxun Xu	(China) Zexuan Yu
2024	(China) Yicheng Zhao	(China) Yang Li	(China) Zexuan Yu

==== U19 ====
Year	Gold	Silver	Bronze
2025	(Germany) Aodhan Umlauf	(Italy) Francesco Ponzinibio	(France) Paco Lehmann
2026	(China) Yanze Shi	(Indonesia) Haddan Malik Baqmuhyibar	(Switzerland) Gilles Meili

==== U17 ====
Year	Gold	Silver	Bronze
2025	(China) Yicheng Zhao	(China) Zexuan Yu	(Japan) Sota Saito
2026	(China) Mingyi Zhou	(France) Minh Long Nguyen-Angelot	(Germany) Moritz Müller

=== Bouldering ===
==== Juniors ====
Year	Gold	Silver	Bronze
2015	(South Korea) Jongwon Chon	(France) Nicolas Pelorson	(Slovenia) Anze Peharc
2016	(Croatia) Borna Cujic	(Switzerland) Baptiste Ometz	(United Kingdom) William Bosi
2017	(Japan) Yoshiyuki Ogata	(Japan) Meichi Narasaki	(Austria) Jan-Luca Posch
2018	(Japan) Meichi Narasaki	(Germany) Yannick Flohé	(Japan) Kai Harada
2019	(Japan) Sohta Amagasa	(France) Leo Favot	(France) Nathan Martin
2021	(United Kingdom) Hamish McArthur	(Japan) Rei Kawamata	(France) Paul Jenft
2022	(Belgium) Hannes Van Duysen	(Japan) Zento Murashita	(Japan) Junta Sekiguchi
2023	(Japan) Junta Sekiguchi	(Germany) Yannick Nagel	(Belgium) Hannes Van Duysen
2024	(Japan) Ritsu Kayotani	(Germany) Yannick Nagel	(Bulgaria) Slav Kirov

==== Youth A ====
Year	Gold	Silver	Bronze
2015	(Japan) Yoshiyuki Ogata	(Japan) Kai Harada	(France) Hugo Parmentier
2016	(Japan) Keita Dohi	(United States) Kai Lightner	(Japan) Kai Harada
2017	(Italy) Filip Schenk	(Japan) Keita Dohi	(Japan) Mizuki Tajima
2018	(France) Sam Avezou	(Spain) Eneko Carretero Cruz	(France) Nathan Martin
2019	(Japan) Ao Yurikusa	(United Kingdom) Hamish McArthur	(Japan) Hajime Takeda
2021	(Belgium) Hannes Van Duysen	(Germany) Emil Zimmermann	(Germany) Thorben Perry Bloem
2022	(Japan) Ritsu Kayotani	(United Kingdom) Toby Roberts	(Japan) Sorato Anraku
2023	(Japan) Ritsu Kayotani	(Japan) Raito Kato	(France) Thomas Lemagner
2024	(Japan) Hareru Nagamori	(South Korea) Beomjin Park	(Belgium) Corentin Laporte

==== Youth B ====
Year	Gold	Silver	Bronze
2015	(Italy) Filip Schenk	(Japan) Keita Dohi	(Belgium) Lukas Franckaert
2016	(France) Nathan Martin	(Italy) Davide Marco Colombo	(Japan) Katsura Konishi
2017	(Japan) Rei Kawamata	(Russia) Semen Ovchinnikov	(Japan) Ryoei Nukui
2018	(Japan) Rei Kawamata	(Austria) Thomas Podolan	(Japan) Ryoei Nukui
2019	(Thailand) Nichol Tomas	(Japan) Junta Sekiguchi	(Latvia) Edvards Gruzitis
2021	(Bulgaria) Nikolay Rusev	(Japan) Sorato Anraku	(United States) Augustine Chi
2022	(United States) Hugo Hoyer	(Italy) Matteo Reusa	(Japan) Hinata Terakawa
2023	(South Korea) Noh Hyun-seung	(Japan) Ryusei Hamada	(Japan) Hareru Nagamori
2024	(Japan) Ryusei Hamada	(South Korea) Chanjin Jung	(Japan) Kazuki Nakata

==== U19 ====
Year	Gold	Silver	Bronze
2025	(Japan) Kodai Yamada	(France) Samuel Richard	(Thailand) Auswin Aueareechit
2026	(South Korea) Beomjin Park	(South Korea) Chanjin Jung	(Italy) Matteo Reusa

==== U17 ====
Year	Gold	Silver	Bronze
2025	(Japan) Ryusei Hamada	(Japan) Taketo Saiki	(Japan) Soran Koyama
2026	(Japan) Kazuki Nakata	(Japan) Taketo Saiki	(South Korea) Hayool Lee

=== Combined ===
==== Juniors ====
Year	Gold	Silver	Bronze
2015	(Austria) Matthias Erber	(Germany) Moritz Hans	(Slovenia) Anze Peharc
2016	(Switzerland) Sascha Lehmann	(United Kingdom) William Bosi	(Germany) Ruben Firnenburg
2017	(Japan) Meichi Narasaki	(Japan) Yoshiyuki Ogata	(United States) Kai Lightner
2019	(Japan) Sohta Amagasa	(Japan) Shuta Tanaka	(Austria) Nicolai Uznik
2021	(Austria) Lawrence Bogeschdorfer	(United Kingdom) Hamish McArthur	(Austria) Johannes Hofherr
2022	(Japan) Zento Murashita	(Japan) Junta Sekiguchi	(Belgium) Hannes Van Duysen

==== Youth A ====
Year	Gold	Silver	Bronze
2015	(Ecuador) Carlos Granja	(France) Hugo Parmentier	(Germany) Anselm Oberdorfer
2016	(France) Arsène Duval	(China) YuFei Pan	(Italy) Filip Schenk
2017	(France) Sam Avezou	(Italy) Filip Schenk	(Bulgaria) Petar Ivanov
2019	(Japan) Ao Yurikusa	(Japan) Hajime Takeda	(Spain) Alberto Ginés López
2021	(Latvia) Edvards Gruzitis	(United Kingdom) Toby Roberts	(Slovenia) Timotej Romšak
2022	(Japan) Sorato Anraku	(United Kingdom) Toby Roberts	(Japan) Ritsu Kayotani

==== Youth B ====
Year	Gold	Silver	Bronze
2015	(Italy) David Piccolruaz	(China) YuFei Pan	(China) DiChong Huang
2016	(France) Sam Avezou	(France) Nathan Martin	(Italy) Davide Marco Colombo
2017	(Russia) Semen Ovchinnikov	(Japan) Rei Kawamata	(Japan) Hidemasa Nishida
2019	(Japan) Junta Sekiguchi	(United States) Oliver Kuang	(Thailand) Nichol Tomas
2021	(United States) Dillon Countryman	(Bulgaria) Nikolay Rusev	(Austria) Timo Uznik
2022	(United States) Hugo Hoyer	(Japan) Riku Ishihara	(Japan) Kodai Yamada

== Female results ==
=== Lead ===
==== Juniors ====
Year	Gold	Silver	Bronze
1992	(Belgium) Muriel Sarkany	(Slovenia) Natasa Stritih	(France) Catherine Musso
1994	(France) Marie Guillet	(Russia) Irina Zaytseva	(Russia) Larissa Buronova
1995	(France) Liv Sansoz	(France) Marie Guillet	(Slovenia) Martina Cufar
1997	(Austria) Bettina schöpf	(Russia) Tatiana Ruyga	(Russia) Natalia Nesterova
1998	(Austria) Bettina schöpf	(Slovenia) Katarina Stremfelj	(Switzerland) Iva Hartmann
1999	(France) Delphine Martin	(Slovenia) Eva Tusar	(Switzerland) Alexandra Eyer
2000	(Austria) Barbara Bacher	(Slovenia) Nastja Guzzi	(Slovenia) Jana Oman
2001	(Ukraine) Olga Shalagina	(France) Emilie Pouget	(Russia) Olga Iakovleva
2002	(Slovenia) Natalija Gros	(France) Emilie Pouget	(Ukraine) Olga Shalagina
2003	(France) Caroline Ciavaldini	(Slovenia) Maja Vidmar	(Italy) Jenny Lavarda
2004	(France) Caroline Ciavaldini	(France) Florence Pinet	(France) Stéphanie Crouvisier
2005	(Slovenia) Mina Markovič	(France) Florence Pinet	(France) Fanny Conan
2006	(Austria) Katharina Saurwein	(Austria) Anna Stöhr	(Germany) Lisa Knoche
2007	(Austria) Christine Schranz	(Russia) Yana Chereshneva	(France) Anne Hoarau
2008	(Japan) Akiyo Noguchi	(Germany) Juliane Wurm	(France) Charlotte Durif
2009	(France) Charlotte Durif	(Slovenia) Ana Ogrinc	(France) Amandine Loury
2010	(Italy) Alexandra Ladurner	(Switzerland) Manuela Sigrist	(Russia) Dinara Fakhritdinova
2011	(France) Julia Serrière	(Austria) Johanna Ernst	(United States) Sasha DiGiulian
2012	(Japan) Momoka Oda	(Austria) Magdalena Röck	(Austria) Katharina Posch
2013	(Austria) Magdalena Röck	(Austria) Katharina Posch	(France) Manon Hily
2014	(Japan) Aya Onoe	(Austria) Jessica Pilz	(France) Julia Chanourdie
2015	(Belgium) Anak Verhoeven	(Austria) Jessica Pilz	(France) Julia Chanourdie
2016	(United States) Margo Hayes	(Austria) Hannah Schubert	(Japan) Aika Tajima
2017	(United States) Claire Buhrfeind	(Japan) Aika Tajima	(Belgium) Heloïse Doumont
2018	(Slovenia) Vita Lukan	(France) Nolwenn Arc	(France) Nina Arthaud
2019	(Italy) Laura Rogora	(France) Nolwenn Arc	(United States) Brooke Raboutou
2021	(Japan) Nonoha Kume	(Slovenia) Lucija Tarkus	(France) Camille Pouget
2022	(Japan) Nonoha Kume	(Japan) Natsuki Tanii	(Czech Republic) Michaela Smetanova
2023	(Slovenia) Sara Čopar	(Japan) Tomona Takao	(Japan) Sana Ogura
2024	(Slovenia) Rosa Rekar	(Ukraine) Anastasiia Kobets	(Austria) Magdalena Kompein

==== Youth A ====
Year	Gold	Silver	Bronze
1992	(Russia) Olga Bibik	(France) Marie Guillet	(Russia) Nataliy Pashennik
1994	(France) Liv Sansoz	(Russia) Mayya Piratinskaya	(Russia) Irina Rouiga
1995	(Germany) Ameli Haager	(Russia) Tatiana Ruyga	(Russia) Irina Rouiga
1996			(Canada) Kathryn Embacher
1997	(Ukraine) Marharyta Usatiuk	(United States) Shena Sturman	(United States) Beth Rodden
1998	(Russia) Maria Belomestnova	(France) Sandrine Levet	(Russia) Yulia Abramchuk
1999	(Ukraine) Olga Shalagina	(France) Sandrine Levet	(Austria) Barbara Bacher
2000	(Slovenia) Natalija Gros	(Ukraine) Olga Shalagina	(Austria) Barbara Schranz
2001	(Italy) Jenny Lavarda	(Slovenia) Natalija Gros	(Russia) Ekaterina Korolkova
2002	(France) Caroline Ciavaldini	(Austria) Angela Eiter	(France) Stéphanie Crouvisier
2003	(France) Alizée Dufraisse	(Japan) Yuka Kobayashi	(Austria) Angela Eiter
2004	(France) Caroline Januel	(France) Maud Ansade	(Belgium) Chloé Graftiaux
2005	(France) Caroline Januel	(Russia) Yana Chereshneva	(Japan) Akiyo Noguchi
2006	(France) Charlotte Durif	(Japan) Akiyo Noguchi	(France) Anne Hoarau
2007	(France) Charlotte Durif	(United States) Marah Bragdon	(United States) Melissa Main
2008	(Austria) Johanna Ernst	(Switzerland) Katherine Choong	(Italy) Alexandra Ladurner
2009	(Switzerland) Katherine Choong	(France) Hélène Janicot (France) Julia Serrière	-
2010	(France) Hélène Janicot	(Austria) Katharina Posch	(Austria) Magdalena Röck
2011	(Austria) Magdalena Röck	(Japan) Momoka Oda	(Norway) Tina Johnsen Hafsaas
2012	(Austria) Jessica Pilz	(Belgium) Anak Verhoeven	(France) Salomé Romain
2013	(Austria) Jessica Pilz	(Belgium) Anak Verhoeven	(France) Julia Chanourdie
2014	(Austria) Hannah Schubert	(Switzerland) Alina Ring	(Sweden) Kajsa Rosen
2015	(Slovenia) Janja Garnbret	(United States) Margo Hayes	(Japan) Aika Tajima
2016	(Slovenia) Janja Garnbret	(Slovenia) Mia Krampl	(Slovenia) Vita Lukan
2017	(United States) Ashima Shiraishi	(United States) Brooke Raboutou	(France) Nolwenn Arc
2018	(United States) Brooke Raboutou	(Japan) Futaba Ito	(Austria) Sandra Lettner
2019	(Ukraine) Nika Potapova	(Japan) Natsumi Hirano	(France) Luce Douady
2021	(Slovenia) Sara Čopar	(Italy) Alessia Mabboni	(Slovenia) Liza Novak
2022	(Bulgaria) Aleksandra Totkova	(Slovenia) Sara Čopar	(South Korea) Gaeyong Oh
2023	(France) Meije Lerondel	(South Korea) Kim Chae-yeong	(Japan) Moka Mochizuki
2024	(Slovenia) Jennifer Eucharia Buckley	(Austria) Flora Oblasser	(Spain) Geila Macià Martín

==== Youth B ====
Year	Gold	Silver	Bronze
1992	(Belgium) Kathleen Vanbellinghen	(France) Lydie Tuccio	(Russia) Mayya Piratinskaya
1994	(Switzerland) Iva Hartmann	(Germany) Ameli Haager	(Germany) Nicola Haager
1995	(United States) Katie Brown	(Slovenia) Katarina Stremfelj	(Russia) Margarita Ryzhkova
1997	(Russia) Maria Belomestnova	(France) Sandrine Levet	(Russia) Marina Malamid
1998	(Ukraine) Olga Shalagina	(Slovenia) Natalija Gros	(Poland) Katarzyna Długosz (Italy) Jenny Lavarda
1999	(Slovenia) Natalija Gros	(Poland) Katarzyna Długosz	(Germany) Nadine Ruh
2000	(Poland) Kinga Ociepka	(United States) Emily Harrington	(Russia) Alexandra Balakireva
2001	(Poland) Kinga Ociepka	(Austria) Angela Eiter	(Austria) Katharina Saurwein
2002	(Belgium) Chloé Graftiaux	(Japan) Yuka Kobayashi	(United States) Tori Allen (Austria) Katharina Saurwein
2003	(Czech Republic) Silvie Rajfova	(France) Caroline Januel	(Russia) Tatiana Shelemeteva
2004	(France) Charlotte Durif	(Switzerland) Christina Schmid	(Czech Republic) Silvie Rajfova
2005	(France) Charlotte Durif	(Russia) Alexandra Malysheva	(Germany) Juliane Wurm
2006	(Austria) Johanna Ernst	(United States) Tiffany Hensley	(Canada) Katie Mah
2007	(Austria) Johanna Ernst	(Italy) Alexandra Ladurner	(United States) Sasha DiGiulian
2008	(Japan) Momoka Oda	(Austria) Berit Schwaiger	(France) Hélène Janicot
2009	(Austria) Katharina Posch	(France) Laura Michelard	(Austria) Karoline Sinnhuber
2010	(Ukraine) Ievgeniia Kazbekova	(Belgium) Anak Verhoeven	(Czech Republic) Andrea Pavlincova
2011	(Austria) Jessica Pilz	(Ukraine) Ievgeniia Kazbekova	(France) Salomé Romain
2012	(Austria) Hannah Schubert	(Japan) Aika Tajima	(Germany) Mona Kellner
2013	(Japan) Aika Tajima	(Germany) Emilie Gerhardt	(Japan) Miwa Oba
2014	(Slovenia) Janja Garnbret	(Italy) Asja Gollo	(Russia) Viktoriia Meshkova
2015	(United States) Ashima Shiraishi	(Slovenia) Mia Krampl	(Italy) Laura Rogora
2016	(United States) Ashima Shiraishi	(United States) Brooke Raboutou	(Italy) Laura Rogora
2017	(Japan) Ai Mori	(Japan) Natsuki Tanii	(Japan) Futaba Ito
2018	(Japan) Natsuki Tanii	(Ukraine) Nika Potapova	(China) YueTong Zhang
2019	(France) Oriane Bertone	(Japan) Hana Koike	(Bulgaria) Aleksandra Totkova
2021	(United States) Anastasia Sanders	(France) Meije Lerondel	(Japan) Mio Nukui
2022	(South Korea) Chaeyeong Kim	(France) Meije Lerondel	(Japan) Kaho Murakoshi
2023	(Japan) Natsumi Oda	(Japan) Kohana Mugishima	(Spain) Geila Macià Martín
2024	(Japan) Arisa Hayashi	(China) Chenxuan Yu	(Switzerland) Julia Rasmussen

==== U19 ====
Year	Gold	Silver	Bronze
2025	(Spain) Geila Macià Martín	(Slovenia) Lana Goric	(France) Louise Puech Yazid
2026	(Austria) Anika Deubler	(Ukraine) Rafael Kazbekova	(Japan) Natsumi Oda

==== U17 ====
Year	Gold	Silver	Bronze
2025	(Ukraine) Rafael Kazbekova	(Serbia) Milena Casetta	(Japan) Arisa Hayashi
2026	(Japan) Arisa Hayashi	(South Korea) Kim Ha Been	(China) Li Meini

=== Speed ===
==== Juniors ====
Year	Gold	Silver	Bronze
2001	(Ukraine) Olga Shalagina	(Russia) Olga Ochtchepkova	(Russia) Olesya Saulevich
2002	(Russia) Olga Ochtchepkova	(Ukraine) Olga Shalagina	(Russia) Anna Stenkovaya
2005	(Ukraine) Olga Bezhko	(Russia) Yana Malkova	(Russia) Anna Gallyamova
2006	(Ukraine) Olga Bezhko	(Austria) Anna Stöhr	(Russia) Yana Malkova
2007	(Venezuela) Rosmery Da Silva	(Russia) Yana Chereshneva	(France) Anne Hoarau
2008	(Russia) Yuliya Levochkina	(Russia) Alina Gaidamakina	(Russia) Kseniya Polekhina
2009	(Russia) Alina Gaidamakina	(Ukraine) Oleksandra BUD Gusaim	(Ukraine) Anastasiya Savisko
2010	(Poland) Klaudia Buczek	(Russia) Anastasia Ermolaeva	(Russia) Dinara Usmanova
2011	(Russia) Anna Tsyganova	(Austria) Stefanie Pichler	(France) Margot Heitz
2012	(France) Anouck Jaubert	(France) Esther Bruckner	(Russia) Iuliia Kaplina
2013	(Poland) Aleksandra Rudzińska	(France) Anouck Jaubert	(Russia) Svetlana Okolnichnikova
2014	(Russia) Svetlana Motovilova	(Ecuador) Andrea Rojas	(Austria) Alexandra Elmer
2015	(Poland) Patrycja Chudziak	(Ukraine) Yana Lugovenko	(Russia) Elena Timofeeva
2016	(Russia) Daria Kan	(Poland) Patrycja Chudziak	(Kazakhstan) Assel Marlenova
2017	(Russia) Daria Kan	(Russia) Elizaveta Ivanova	(Russia) Ekaterina Barashchuk
2018	(Russia) Ekaterina Barashchuk	(Russia) Elizaveta Ivanova	(Russia) Elena Remizova
2019	(Russia) Elena Remizova	(Chile) Alejandra Contreras	(Poland) Aleksandra Kałucka
2021	(Germany) Franziska Ritter	(Italy) Giulia Randi	(France) Capucine Viglione
2022	(Italy) Beatrice Colli	(Germany) Nuria Brockfeld	(Germany) Franziska Ritter
2023	(Japan) Karin Hayashi	(Poland) Maria Szwed	(United States) Callie Close
2024	(China) Yuju Mou	(China) Tianxiang Zhang	(Indonesia) Berliana Puteri Wijaya

==== Youth A ====
Year	Gold	Silver	Bronze
2001	(Russia) Olga Evstigneeva	(Ukraine) Olga Losynska	(Russia) Olga Semykina
2002	(Russia) Anna Gallyamova	(Russia) Evguenia Ogandjanian	(Russia) Olga Evstigneeva
2005	(Russia) Yana Chereshneva	(United States) Alex Johnson	(Ukraine) Olena Sheremetyeva
2006	(Russia) Yana Chereshneva	(Austria) Stefanie Kofler	(United States) Alex Johnson
2007	(Russia) Kseniya Polekhina	(Russia) Alina Gaidamakina	(United States) Tiffany Hensley
2008	(Russia) Dinara Fakhritdinova	(Russia) Yulia Troepolskaya	(Russia) Anastasia Ermolaeva
2009	(Russia) Dinara Fakhritdinova	(Russia) Dinara Usmanova	(Italy) Anna Gislimberti
2010	(Russia) Anna Tsyganova	(France) Esther Bruckner	(Poland) Aleksandra Rudzińska
2011	(Poland) Aleksandra Rudzińska	(France) Esther Bruckner	(France) Anouck Jaubert
2012	(Russia) Anna Emets	(Russia) Valeria Baranova	(Austria) Nina Lach
2013	(Russia) Elena Timofeeva	(United States) Kayla Lieuw	(United States) Kyra Condie
2014	(Russia) Daria Kan	(Russia) Anastasiia Golikova	(Russia) Anastasia Manuylova
2015	(France) Elma Fleuret	(Russia) Ekaterina Barashchuk	(Russia) Elizaveta Ivanova
2016	(Russia) Elizaveta Ivanova	(France) Elma Fleuret	(Italy) Elisabetta Dalla Brida
2017	(Poland) Aleksandra Kałucka	(China) Song Yiling	(Russia) Polina Aksenova
2018	(Poland) Natalia Kałucka	(Russia) Kamilla Kushaeva	(Poland) Aleksandra Kałucka
2019	(United States) Emma Hunt	(United States) Kiara Pellicane-Hart	(Italy) Anna Calanca
2021	(Italy) Beatrice Colli	(Germany) Nuria Brockfeld	(United States) Callie Close
2022	(France) Manon Lebon	(Italy) Sofia Bellesini	(Japan) Ai Takeuchi
2023	(China) Tianxiang Zhang	(Ukraine) Kseniia Horielova	(China) Feiyan Yang
2024	(China) Shixue Meng	(China) Feiyan Yang	(China) Xinyi Huang

==== Youth B ====
Year	Gold	Silver	Bronze
2001	(Austria) Barbara Baumann	(Ukraine) Nataliia Stoliarova	(Ukraine) Kateryna Busheva
2002	(United States) Tori Allen	(Austria) Anna Stöhr	(Czech Republic) Eliska Karesova
2005	(Australia) Libby Hall	(Russia) Kseniya Polekhina	(United States) Tiffany Hensley
2006	(Russia) Dinara Fakhritdinova	(United States) Tiffany Hensley	(Italy) Cassandra Zampar
2007	(Russia) Dinara Fakhritdinova	(Austria) Stefanie Pichler	(Venezuela) Rossi Gabazú
2008	(United States) Taylor Clarkin	(United States) Francesca Metcalf	(United States) Cicada Jenerik
2009	(Poland) Aleksandra Rudzińska	(Czech Republic) Anna Wágnerová	(Italy) Michela Facci
2010	(United States) Dana Riddle	(Austria) Alexandra Elmer	(Russia) Valeria Baranova
2011	(Russia) Polina Shelpakova	(Austria) Alexandra Elmer	(Russia) Anastasiia Golikova
2012	(Venezuela) Leslie Romero	(Ecuador) Nicole Mejia	(Russia) Anastasiia Golikova
2013	(Russia) Daria Kan	(United States) Margarita Marsanova	(Russia) Anastasia Manuylova
2014	(Russia) Ekaterina Barashchuk	(United States) Sidney Trinidad	(Russia) Elena Krasovskaia
2015	(Italy) Elisabetta Dalla Brida	(Russia) Karina Gareeva	(Russia) Elena Krasovskaia
2016	(Russia) Karina Gareeva	(Russia) Daria Kuznetsova	(Italy) Giorgia Strazieri
2017	(Russia) Polina Kulagina	(Russia) Daria Potapova	(Russia) Kamilla Kushaeva
2018	(South Korea) Jeong Ji-min	(Italy) Anna Calanca	(United States) Emma Hunt
2019	(United States) Callie Close	(Germany) Nuria Brockfeld	(France) Manon Lebon
2021	(Poland) Daria Marciniak	(Italy) Francesca Matuella	(Germany) Julie Fritsche
2022	(Ukraine) Kseniia Horielova	(Ukraine) Polina Khalkevych	(France) Maelane Villedieu
2023	(Ukraine) Polina Khalkevych	(China) Xinyi Huang	(China) Jiayi Lin
2024	(Italy) Alice Marcelli	(China) Chunyouxuan Wang	(Thailand) Ratchamon Thongbai

==== U19 ====
Year	Gold	Silver	Bronze
2025	(China) Shixue Meng	(China) Yuting Wang	(China) Yumei Bai
2026	(China) Xinyi Huang	(Ukraine) Polina Khalkevych	(Individual Neutral Athletes) Milana Melnichenko

==== U17 ====
Year	Gold	Silver	Bronze
2025	(United States) Evie Albrecht	(China) Jiaxin Tang	(China) Chunyouxuan Wang
2026	(New Zealand) Mila Piatek	(Thailand) Kanyanat Arsakit	(China) Nuo Chen

=== Bouldering ===
==== Juniors ====
Year	Gold	Silver	Bronze
2015	(Serbia) Staša Gejo	(Japan) Miho Nonaka	(Austria) Jessica Pilz
2016	(United States) Margo Hayes	(United Kingdom) Tara Hayes	(Austria) Franziska Sterrer
2017	(United States) Claire Buhrfeind	(United States) Maya Madere	(Germany) Johanna Holfeld
2018	(United Kingdom) Hannah Slaney	(Slovenia) Urska Repusic	(Slovenia) Vita Lukan
2019	(Italy) Laura Rogora	(United States) Natalia Grossman	(Germany) Lucia Dörffel
2021	(France) Naïle Meignan	(United Kingdom) Emily Phillips	(Slovenia) Lucija Tarkus
2022	(France) Zélia Avezou	(France) Selma Elhadj Mimoune	(United States) Kylie Cullen
2023	(France) Selma Elhadj Mimoune	(Slovenia) Sara Copar	(Spain) Iziar Martínez Almendros
2024	(France) Lily Abriat	(Ukraine) Anastasiia Kobets	(Germany) Anna Maria Apel

==== Youth A ====
Year	Gold	Silver	Bronze
2015	(Slovenia) Janja Garnbret	(United States) Margo Hayes	(Italy) Asja Gollo
2016	(Slovenia) Janja Garnbret	(Slovenia) Vita Lukan	(United States) Maya Madere
2017	(United States) Ashima Shiraishi	(Russia) Luiza Emeleva	(United States) Brooke Raboutou
2018	(Italy) Laura Rogora	(Slovenia) Lucka Rakovec	(Japan) Futaba Ito
2019	(France) Luce Douady	(Japan) Natsumi Hirano	(Japan) Saki Kikuchi
2021	(France) Zélia Avezou	(Slovenia) Sara Čopar	(Italy) Alessia Mabboni
2022	(Slovenia) Sara Čopar	(Japan) Michika Nagashima	(Italy) Alessia Mabboni
2023	(Japan) Kaho Murakoshi	(Slovenia) Jennifer Eucharia Buckley	(France) Lily Abriat
2024	(Slovenia) Jennifer Eucharia Buckley	(Japan) Kaho Murakoshi	(Spain) Geila Macià Martín

==== Youth B ====
Year	Gold	Silver	Bronze
2015	(United States) Ashima Shiraishi	(Russia) Elena Krasovskaia	(Slovenia) Vita Lukan
2016	(United States) Ashima Shiraishi	(Japan) Futaba Ito	(United States) Brooke Raboutou
2017	(Japan) Futaba Ito	(Japan) Natsuki Tanii	(Japan) Saki Kikuchi
2018	(Japan) Natsuki Tanii	(France) Naile Meignan	(Japan) Hana Kudo
2019	(France) Oriane Bertone	(Japan) Ryu Nakagawa	(Japan) Hana Koike
2021	(United States) Anastasia Sanders	(France) Meije Lerondel	(Austria) Sina Willy
2022	(United States) Anastasia Sanders	(Japan) Natsumi Oda	(Japan) Kaho Murakoshi
2023	(United States) Analise Van Hoang	(Spain) Geila Macià Martín	(Japan) Natsumi Oda
2024	(China) Meini Li	(South Korea) Gyurin Kim	(Japan) Waka Murakami

==== U19 ====
Year	Gold	Silver	Bronze
2025	(Japan) Kaho Murakoshi	(Spain) Geila Macià Martín	(Japan) Manami Yama
2026	(Germany) Paula Mayer-Vorfelder	(United States) Analise Van Hoang	(France) Louise Puech Yazid

==== U17 ====
Year	Gold	Silver	Bronze
2025	(China) Meini Li	(United States) Lucy Duncan	(France) Lou Auclair
2026	(Switzerland) Amélie Kägi	(China) Youtian Tan	(China) Meini Li

=== Combined ===
==== Juniors ====
Year	Gold	Silver	Bronze
2015	(Serbia) Staša Gejo	(Austria) Jessica Pilz	(United States) Kyra Condie
2016	(United States) Margo Hayes	(Switzerland) Andrea Kümin	(Russia) Iuliia Panteleeva
2017	(Austria) Laura Stöckler	(Russia) Iuliia Panteleeva	(United States) Margo Hayes
2019	(Italy) Laura Rogora	(United States) Natalia Grossman	(Germany) Lucia Dörffel
2021	(United Kingdom) Emily Phillips	(Slovenia) Lucija Tarkus	(Iran) Mahya Darabian
2022	(Japan) Natsuki Tanii	(Czech Republic) Michaela Smetanova	(United States) Kylie Cullen

==== Youth A ====
Year	Gold	Silver	Bronze
2015	(United States) Grace McKeehan	(Slovenia) Janja Garnbret	(Italy) Asja Gollo
2016	(Russia) Elena Krasovskaia	(Slovenia) Janja Garnbret	(Russia) Luiza Emeleva
2017	(Austria) Sandra Lettner	(United States) Ashima Shiraishi	(United States) Brooke Raboutou
2019	(Japan) Natsumi Hirano	(Austria) Julia Lotz	(United Kingdom) Emily Phillips
2021	(Slovenia) Sara Čopar	(United States) Callie Close	(Slovenia) Liza Novak
2022	(Slovenia) Sara Čopar	(Italy) Alessia Mabboni	(Japan) Michika Nagashima

==== Youth B ====
Year	Gold	Silver	Bronze
2015	(Russia) Elena Krasovskaia	(United States) Brooke Raboutou	(Italy) Laura Rogora
2016	(United States) Brooke Raboutou	(Austria) Celina Schoibl	(Italy) Laura Rogora
2017	(Japan) Natsuki Tanii	(Japan) Ai Mori	(Japan) Futaba Ito
2019	(Slovenia) Sara Čopar	(Bulgaria) Aleksandra Totkova	(South Korea) Heeju Noh
2021	(United States) Anastasia Sanders	(Ukraine) Anastasia Kobets	(Austria) Sina Willy
2022	(Japan) Kaho Murakoshi	(France) Meije Lerondel	(United States) Anastasia Sanders
