= Jakob Schubert =

Austrian rock climber

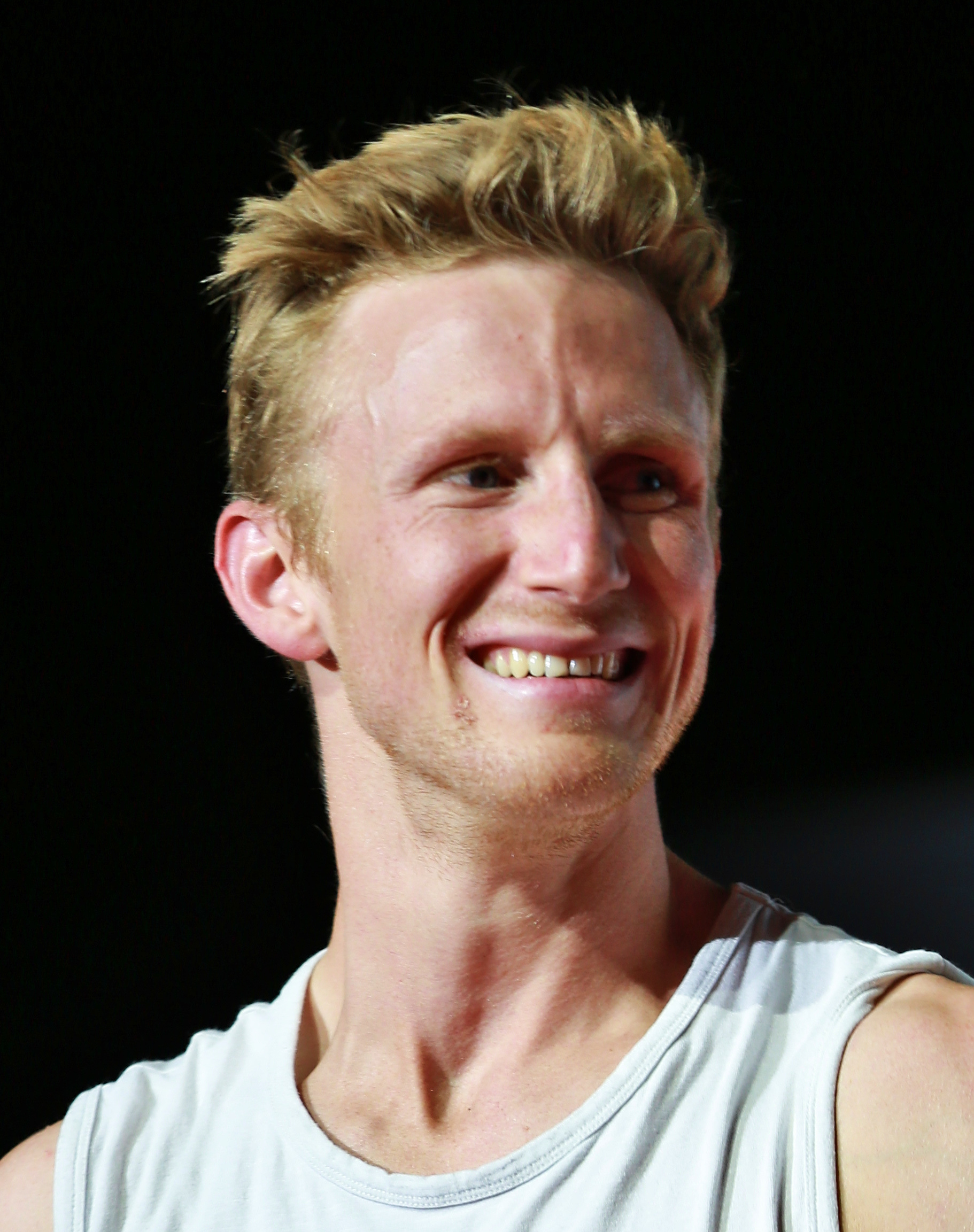
- Schubert at the 2018 IFSC Climbing World Championships

Personal information
- Nationality: Austrian
- Born: 31 December 1990 (age 35) Innsbruck, Austria
- Occupation: Professional sport climber
- Height: 176 cm (5 ft 9 in)
- Weight: 63 kg (139 lb)
- Website: www.jakob-schubert.com

Climbing career
- Type of climber: Competition climbing; Sport climbing; Bouldering
- Highest grade: Redpoint: 9c (5.15d); Onsight/Flash: 8c (5.14b); Bouldering: 9A (V17)
- First ascents: Companion of Change (9a+, 2015); Kein Licht Kein Schatten (9a, 2016); B.I.G. (9c, 2023)
- Known for: Three-time World Cup (lead) winner (2011, 2014, 2018); Four-time World (lead) Champion (2012, 2018, 2021, 2023); Two-time Olympic medalist (combined); Most men's IFSC Gold Medals
Medal record
Men's competition climbing
Representing Austria
Olympic Games
Bronze medal – third place	2020 Tokyo	Combined
Bronze medal – third place	2024 Paris	Combined
World Championships
Gold medal – first place	2012 Paris	Lead
Gold medal – first place	2018 Innsbruck	Lead
Gold medal – first place	2018 Innsbruck	Combined
Gold medal – first place	2021 Moscow	Lead
Gold medal – first place	2023 Bern	Lead
Gold medal – first place	2023 Bern	Combined
Silver medal – second place	2011 Arco	Lead
Silver medal – second place	2016 Paris	Lead
Silver medal – second place	2019 Hachiōji	Bouldering
Silver medal – second place	2019 Hachiōji	Combined
Bronze medal – third place	2019 Hachiōji	Lead
World Cup (Season)
Gold medal – first place	2011	Lead
Gold medal – first place	2011	Combined
Gold medal – first place	2012	Combined
Gold medal – first place	2013	Combined
Gold medal – first place	2014	Lead
Gold medal – first place	2018	Lead
Gold medal – first place	2018	Combined
Silver medal – second place	2016	Lead
Silver medal – second place	2016	Combined
Bronze medal – third place	2015	Lead
World Youth Championships
Gold medal – first place	2007	Youth Lead
Gold medal – first place	2008	Juniors Lead
Gold medal – first place	2009	Juniors Lead
Silver medal – second place	2005	Youth Lead
Silver medal – second place	2006	Youth Lead
European Championships
Gold medal – first place	2022 Munich	Combined
Bronze medal – third place	2010	Lead
Bronze medal – third place	2013	Bouldering
Bronze medal – third place	2017	Lead
- Updated on 20 August, 2026

Jakob Schubert (born 31 December 1990) is an Austrian professional rock climber, specializing in competition climbing (lead and boulder), sport climbing, and bouldering. He is a four-time World Champion (2012, 2018, 2021, 2023) and three-time World Cup winner (2011, 2014, 2018) in lead climbing. He is a two-time Olympic bronze medalist in the combined event (2020 and 2024).

As of 2023, Schubert had won the most men's IFSC gold medals of any male competition climber in history.

In addition to competition climbing, Schubert was the first climber in the world to have both redpointed a 9c (5.15d) graded sport climbing route and climbed a 9A (V17) graded bouldering problem.

== Climbing career ==
=== Competition climbing ===
Schubert started competition climbing in 2003 when he was twelve years old. In 2004, he participated in the European Youth Cup and World Youth Championships. Since 2007, he has regularly participated in World Cup competitions for lead climbing and bouldering.

In 2011, he won the Lead World Cup and the silver medal at the Lead World Championships in Arco. The World Cup was outstandingly obtained by winning seven consecutive competitions in that season. Previously, no climber was ever able to win as many World Cup competitions in a single season (in 2002, Alexandre Chabot had won six).

In 2012, he won the Lead Climbing World Championships in Paris.

In 2014, he won the Lead World Cup for the second time.

In 2018, when he was 27 years old, he became World Champion again, in his own birthplace and hometown, Innsbruck. He earned the title by reaching in the final event the same score as Adam Ondra (36+), but a higher score in the semifinal, where he ranked second after Domen Škofic. A few days later, in the same competition, he also conquered the Combined title by ranking second in Speed, first in Bouldering, and second in Lead. In the same year, he was awarded his third World Cup.

Schubert's performance at the 2019 IFSC Climbing World Championships qualified him for a place at the 2020 Summer Olympics in Tokyo, where he won the bronze medal in the combined event.

Schubert won the lead event at the 2023 IFSC Climbing World Championships, becoming the oldest world champion in the sport. He followed that up by winning the combined event, which qualified him to compete in the combined event at the 2024 Summer Olympics in Paris.

He won a second consecutive bronze medal in the combined event at the 2024 Summer Olympics.

Schubert competed two IFSC World Cups in 2025 and, as of August 2026, three World Climbing Series in 2026, all in Lead.

=== Rock climbing ===
In 2023, Schubert became the only person in the world to have climbed the top grade in both bouldering and sport climbing. In 2026, Schubert became the first climber to climb two 9c (5.15d)-graded routes.

== Rankings ==
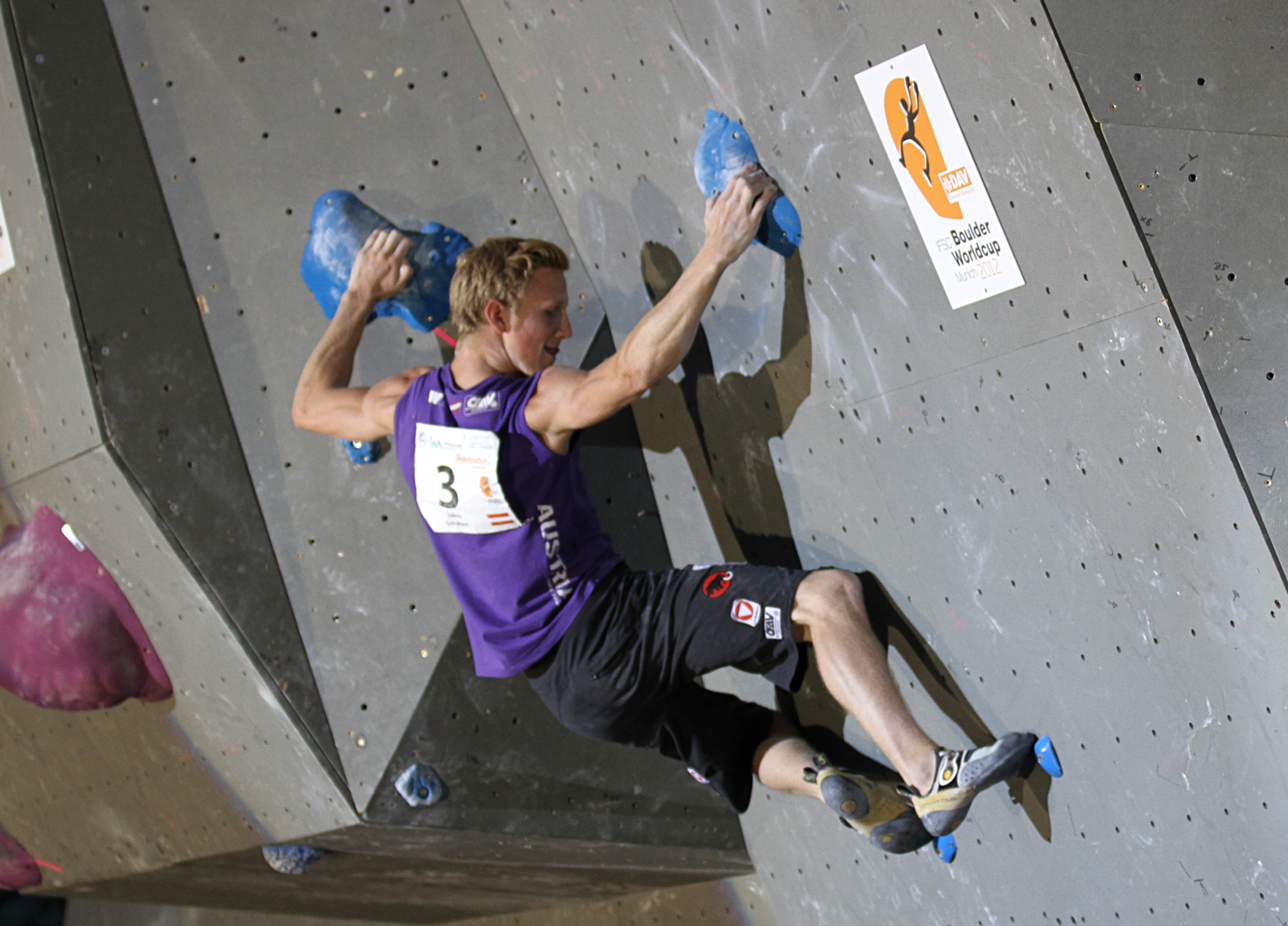
Jakob Schubert at the World Cup in Munich, 2012.

=== Climbing World Cup ===
Discipline	2007	2008	2009	2010	2011	2012	2013	2014	2015	2016	2017	2018	2019	2021	2022	2023	2024	2025	2026
Lead	26	7	4	2	1	3	2	1	3	2	6	1	14	16	33	10	20	29	10
Bouldering	-	-	60	65	19	3	2	-	25	23	10	9	10	16	12	36	11	-	-
Speed	-	-	-	-	-	43	59	-	62	-	-	51	-	-	-	-	-	-	-
Combined	-	-	4	2	1	1	1	-	4	2	6	1	3	-	-	-	-	-	-

=== Climbing World Championships ===
Youth

Discipline	2004 Youth B	2005 Youth B	2006 Youth A	2007 Youth A	2008 Juniors	2009 Juniors
Lead	33	2	2	1	1	1

Adult

Discipline	2009	2011	2012	2014	2016	2018	2019	2021	2023	2025
Lead	26	2	1	5	2	1	3	1	1	7
Bouldering	-	-	-	-	-	10	2	27	12	-
Speed	-	-	-	-	-	110	59	-	-	-
Combined	-	-	-	-	-	1	2	-	1	-

=== Climbing European Championships ===
Discipline	2008	2010	2013	2015	2017
Lead	6	3	7	6	3
Bouldering	-	-	3	4	-
Speed	-	-	35	27	31

== Number of medals in the Climbing European Youth Cup ==
=== Lead ===
Season	Category	Gold	Silver	Bronze	Total
2004	Youth B			1	1
2005	Youth B			1	1
2006	Youth A	3	1	1	5
Total		3	1	3	7

== Number of medals in the Climbing World Cup ==
=== Lead ===
Season	Gold	Silver	Bronze	Total
2008		1		1
2009	1		1	2
2010	1	2	1	4
2011	7	1	1	9
2012	1	3	1	5
2013	2	2	1	5
2014	2	1	2	5
2015		2	2	4
2016		2	3	5
2017	2		1	3
2018	2	3		5
2019			1	1
2020			1	1
2021	1			1
2023	1		1	2
2024	1			1
2026			2	2
Total	21	17	18	56

=== Bouldering ===
Season	Gold	Silver	Bronze	Total
2011		1		1
2012	1		1	2
2013	1	1	1	3
2018			1	1
2019	1		1	2
2021			1	1
2024			1	1
Total	3	2	6	11

== Number of medals in the Olympics ==
=== Combined ===
Summer Olympics	Gold	Silver	Bronze	Total
2020			1	1
2024			1	1
Total	0	0	2	2

== Notable ascents ==
=== Redpointed routes ===
9c (5.15d):

- DNA – Verdon Gorge (France) – 10 October 2026 – Second recorded ascent.
- B.I.G. – Flatanger (Norway) – 20 September 2023 – First ascent and third-ever proposed at 9c.

9b+ (5.15c):

- Perfecto Mundo – Margalef (ESP) – 9 November 2019 – Third ascent (first by Alexander Megos).

9b (5.15b):

- The Flame - Austria (AUT) – 2023 – First ascent
- Erebor – Arco (ITA) – 2022 – Repeat ascent of Stefano Ghisolfi's route.
- King Capella – Siurana (ESP) – 2021 – Third ascent of William Bosi's route.
- Neanderthal – Santa Linya (ESP) – 28 December 2018 – Second ascent after Chris Sharma.
- El Bon Combat – Cova de I'Ocell (ESP) – 1 December 2018 – Second ascent after Chris Sharma.
- Stoking the Fire – Santa Linya (ESP) – 5 January 2018 – Third ascent (first by Chris Sharma, 2013).
- La Planta da Shiva – Villanueva del Rosario (ESP) – 4 January 2016 – Second ascent after Adam Ondra.
- Fight or flight – Oliana (ESP) – 31 December 2014 – Third ascent (first by Chris Sharma, 2011).

9a+ (5.15a)

- Qui – Tyrol (AUT) – 2 October 2023
- Clash of the Titans – Tyrol (AUT) – 3 October 2022
- La Furia de Jabali – Siurana (ESP) – 15 December 2021
- La Capella – Siurana (ESP) – 11 December 2021
- Es Pontàs – Mallorca (ESP) – October 2021 – Fourth ascent of Chris Sharma's 2006 route.
- Catxasa – Santa Linya (ESP) – 9 January 2018 – Second ascent after Chris Sharma
- Seleccio Anal – Oliana (ESP) – 8 January 2017
- Pachamama – Oliana (ESP) – 2 January 2017 – Third ascent (first by Chris Sharma, 2009)
- Joe Mama – Oliana (ESP) – 27 December 2016 – Second ascent after Chris Sharma
- Kangroo Limb – Flatanger (NOR) – 29 May 2016 – Second ascent after Adam Ondra
- Companion of Change – Zillertal (AUT) – 18 November 2015 – First ascent
- Papichulo – Oliana (ESP) – 27 April 2011 – Sixth ascent (first by Chris Sharma, 2008)

9a (5.14d):

- Alasha – Port de Sóller (ESP) – 10 October 2021 – Second ascent
- Weiße Rose – Schleierfall (AUT) – 30 April 2010 – Third ascent
- Kein Licht Kein Schatten – Ötztal (AUT) – 8 November 2016 – First ascent
- Kraftplatzl – Berglsteiner See (AUT) – 15 October 2016 – Second Ascent after David Lama
- Direct open your mind – Santa Linya (ESP) – 3 January 2013
- Fuck the System – Santa Linya (ESP)- 2 January 2013
- Analogica Natural – Santa Linya (ESP) – 2 January 2013
- Seleccio Natural – Santa Linya (ESP) – 28 December 2012
- Ciudad de Dios – Santa Linya (ESP) – 24 December 2012
- Martin Krpan – Misja Pec (SVN) – 21 November 2011
- Hades – Nassereith, Götterwand (AUT) – 30 May 2010 – First ascent by Andreas Bindhammer, 2008
- Underground – Massone, Arco (ITA) – 30 March 2010 – First ascent by Manfred Stuffer, 1998

=== Onsighted routes ===
8c (5.14b):

- Valkyries – Flatanger (NOR) – September 2023
- Nordic Flower – Flatanger (NOR) – May 2016
- Aitzol – Margalef (ESP) – 23 April 2011

=== Boulder problems ===
9A (V17)

- Shaolin – Red Rock Canyon (USA) – February 2026
- Mount Doom – Maltatal (AUT) – 17 November 2025
- Alphane – Chironico (CHE) – 21 December 2023

8C+ (V16)

- Ephyra – Chironico (CHE) – February 2026
- Vecchio Leone SDS – Brione (CHE) – 12 January 2025
- The Story of Three Worlds – Cresciano (CHE) – 12 January 2025
- Return of the Dreamtime – Cresciano (CHE) – 28 December 2024

8C (V15)

- Emotional Landscapes – Maltatal (AUT) – 5 March 2026
- The Nest – Red Rock Canyon (USA) – January 2026
- The Lion's Share – Brione (CHE) – 12 January 2025
- Primitivo – Ticino (CHE) – 16 March 2021
- La Force Tranquille Direct – Magic Wood (CHE) – 14 November 2020 – First Ascent
- Sierra Madre – Zillertal (AUT) – 20 November 2018

8B+ (V14)

- Mithril Sit – Cresciano (CHE) – 11 January 2026
- The Innocent Man – Brione (CHE) – December 2025
- Big Paw – Chironico (CHE) – 27 December 2024
- Anam Cara – Silvapark (AUT) – 23 August 2021 – flashed
- Ill Thrill – Magic Wood (CHE) – 28 July 2020
- The Never Ending Story – Magic Wood (CHE) – June 2020 – flashed
- Off the Wagon - Val Bavona (CHE) 10 January 2020
- Witness the fitness – Cova de Ocell (ESP) – 13 January 2019 – flashed
- Hide and Sick – Maltatal (AUT) – 25 March 2018

== See also ==
- List of grade milestones in rock climbing
- History of rock climbing
- Rankings of most career IFSC gold medals
