= 2011 IFSC Climbing World Youth Championships =

Competition climbing event

2011 IFSC Climbing World Championships
- Location: (Austria) Imst
- Date: 25 - 28 August 2011

The 2011 IFSC Climbing World Youth Championships (21st), was held in Imst from 25 to 28 August 2011. The competition climbing championships consisted of lead and speed events, for the under 20, under 18, and under 16 age categories.

== Medal table ==
* Host nation (Austria)

Rank	Nation	Gold	Silver	Bronze	Total
1	Russia	3	3	3	9
2	Austria*	3	2	0	5
3	France	2	2	2	6
4	Slovenia	2	0	0	2
5	Ukraine	1	1	1	3
6	Poland	1	1	0	2
7	Japan	0	2	1	3
8	Great Britain	0	1	0	1
9	Italy	0	0	2	2
10	Belgium	0	0	1	1
10	Norway	0	0	1	1
10	United States	0	0	1	1
Totals (12 entries)		12	12	12	36

== Medalists ==
=== Male ===
Event	Gold	Silver	Bronze
Junior (Under 20)
Lead	Jure Raztresen; Slovenia	Edward Hamer; Great Britain	Stefano Ghisolfi; Italy
Speed	Danyil Boldyrev; Ukraine	Marcin Dzienski; Poland	Sergiy Barkovskyy; Ukraine
Youth A (Under 18)
Lead	Domen Skofic; Slovenia	Dmitrii Fakirianov; Russia	Loïc Timmermans; Belgium
Speed	Konstantin Payl; Russia	Artem Savelyev; Russia	Nikita Suyushkin; Russia
Youth B (Under 16)
Lead	Bernhard Röck; Austria	Naoki Shimatani; Japan	Keiichiro Korenaga; Japan
Speed	Ruslan Faizullin; Russia	Georgy Artamonov; Russia	Alessandro Santoni; Italy

=== Female ===
Event	Gold	Silver	Bronze
Junior (Under 20)
Lead	Julia Serrière; France	Johanna Ernst; Austria	Sasha DiGiulian; United States
Speed	Anouck Jaubert; France	Esther Bruckner; France	Iuliia Kaplina; Russia
Youth A (Under 18)
Lead	Magdalena Röck; Austria	Momoka Oda; Japan	Tina Johnsen Hafsaas; Norway
Speed	Aleksandra Mirosław; Poland	Esther Bruckner; France	Anouck Jaubert; France
Youth B (Under 16)
Lead	Jessica Pilz; Austria	Ievgeniia Kazbekova; Ukraine	Salomé Romain; France
Speed	Polina Shelpakova; Russia	Alexandra Elmer; Austria	Anastasiia Golikova; Russia
