= 2019 IFSC Climbing World Youth Championships =

Competition climbing event

2019 IFSC Climbing World Championships
- Location: (Italy) Arco
- Date: 22–31 August 2019

The 2019 IFSC Climbing World Youth Championships (29th), was held in Arco, Italy from 22 to 31 August 2019. The competition climbing championships consisted of lead, speed, and bouldering events, for the under 20, under 18, and under 16 age categories.

== Medal table ==
* Host nation (Italy)

Rank	Nation	Gold	Silver	Bronze	Total
1	Japan	5	7	4	16
2	France	3	2	3	8
3	Russia	3	1	0	4
4	United States	2	5	1	8
5	Italy*	2	0	1	3
6	Ukraine	2	0	0	2
7	Thailand	1	0	0	1
8	Germany	0	1	1	2
9	Chile	0	1	0	1
9	Great Britain	0	1	0	1
11	Bulgaria	0	0	1	1
11	Canada	0	0	1	1
11	Indonesia	0	0	1	1
11	Latvia	0	0	1	1
11	Luxembourg	0	0	1	1
11	Poland	0	0	1	1
11	South Korea	0	0	1	1
11	Spain	0	0	1	1
Totals (18 entries)		18	18	18	54

== Medalists ==
=== Male ===
Event	Gold	Silver	Bronze
Junior (Under 20)
Lead	Shuta Tanaka; Japan	Sohta Amagasa; Japan	Alistair Duval; France
Bouldering	Sohta Amagasa; Japan	Leo Favot; France	Nathan Martin; Luxembourg
Speed	Sergei Rukin; Russia	Almaz Nagaev; Russia	Rahmad Adi Mulyono; Indonesia
Youth A (Under 18)
Lead	Hidemasa Nishida; Japan	Colin Duffy; United States	Alberto Ginés López; Spain
Bouldering	Ao Yurikusa; Japan	Hamish McArthur; Great Britain	Hajime Takeda; Japan
Speed	Iaroslav Pashkov; Russia	Jordan Fishman; United States	Jung Yongjun; South Korea
Youth B (Under 16)
Lead	Junta Sekiguchi; Japan	Haruki Uemura; Japan	Satone Yoshida; Japan
Bouldering	Nichol Tomas; Thailand	Junta Sekiguchi; Japan	Edvards Gruzitis; Latvia
Speed	Hryhorii Ilchyshyn; Ukraine	Oliver Kuang; United States	Dylan Le; Canada

=== Female ===
Event	Gold	Silver	Bronze
Junior (Under 20)
Lead	Laura Rogora; Italy	Nolwenn Arc; France	Brooke Raboutou; United States
Bouldering	Laura Rogora; Italy	Natalia Grossman; United States	Lucia Dörffel; Germany
Speed	Elena Remizova; Russia	Alenjandre Contreras; Chile	Aleksandra Kałucka; Poland
Youth A (Under 18)
Lead	Nika Potapova; Ukraine	Natsumi Hirano; Japan	Luce Douady; France
Bouldering	Luce Douady; France	Natsumi Hirano; Japan	Saki Kikuchi; Japan
Speed	Emma Hunt; United States	Kiara Pellicane-Hart; United States	Anna Calanca; Italy
Youth B (Under 16)
Lead	Oriane Bertone; France	Hana Koike; Japan	Aleksandra Totkova; Bulgaria
Bouldering	Oriane Bertone; France	Ryu Nakagawa; Japan	Hana Koike; Japan
Speed	Callie Close; United States	Nuria Brockfeld; Germany	Manon Lebon; France
