= 2008 IFSC Climbing World Youth Championships =

Competition climbing event

2008 IFSC Climbing World Championships
- Location: (Australia) Sydney
- Date: 28 - 31 August 2008

The 2008 IFSC Climbing World Youth Championships (18th), was held in Sydney from 28 to 31 August 2008. The competition climbing championships consisted of lead and speed events, for the under 20, under 18, and under 16 age categories.

== Medal table ==
* Host nation (Australia)

Rank	Nation	Gold	Silver	Bronze	Total
1	Russia	4	3	2	9
2	Austria	3	2	0	5
3	Japan	2	0	0	2
4	United States	1	1	4	6
5	Czech Republic	1	0	1	2
6	Venezuela	1	0	0	1
7	Germany	0	2	0	2
8	Ecuador	0	1	0	1
8	South Korea	0	1	0	1
8	Switzerland	0	1	0	1
8	Ukraine	0	1	0	1
12	France	0	0	2	2
13	China	0	0	1	1
13	Italy	0	0	1	1
13	Spain	0	0	1	1
Totals (15 entries)		12	12	12	36

== Medalists ==
=== Male ===
Event	Gold	Silver	Bronze
Junior (Under 20)
Lead	Jakob Schubert; Austria	Min Hyunbin; South Korea	Martin Stranik; Czech Republic
Speed	Sergey Abdrakhmanov; Russia	Maksim Osipov; Ukraine	Zhong Qixin; China
Youth A (Under 18)
Lead	Mario Lechner; Austria	Thomas Tauporn; Germany	Eric Lopez Mateos; Spain
Speed	Josmar Nieves; Venezuela	Isaac Estevez; Ecuador	Nic Sutton; United States
Youth B (Under 16)
Lead	Adam Ondra; Czech Republic	Max Rudigier; Austria	Julian Bautista; United States
Speed	Viacheslav Vedenchuk; Russia	Ivan Spitsyn; Russia	Josh Levin; United States

=== Female ===
Event	Gold	Silver	Bronze
Junior (Under 20)
Lead	Akiyo Noguchi; Japan	Juliane Wurm; Germany	Charlotte Durif; France
Speed	Yuliya Levochkina; Russia	Alina Daidamakina; Russia	Kseniya Polekhina; Russia
Youth A (Under 18)
Lead	Johanna Ernst; Austria	Katherine Choong; Switzerland	Alexandra Ladurner; Italy
Speed	Dinara Fakhritdinova; Russia	Yulia Troepolskaya; Russia	Anastasia Ermolaeva; Russia
Youth B (Under 16)
Lead	Momoka Oda; Japan	Berit Schwaiger; Austria	Hélène Janicot; France
Speed	Taylor Clarkin; United States	Francesca Metcalf; United States	Cicada Jenerik; United States
