= 2003 IFSC Climbing World Youth Championships =

Competition climbing event

2003 UIAA World Youth Championship
- Location: Veliko Tarnovo, Bulgaria
- Date: 19 - 21 September 2003

The 2003 UIAA World Youth Championship (13th), was held in Veliko Tarnovo, Bulgaria from 19 to 21 September 2003. The competition climbing championships consisted of the lead event for the under 20, under 18, and under 16 age categories.

== Medal table ==
* Host nation (Bulgaria)

Rank	Nation	Gold	Silver	Bronze	Total
1	France	3	1	2	6
2	Canada	1	0	0	1
2	Czech Republic	1	0	0	1
2	Spain	1	0	0	1
5	Slovenia	0	1	1	2
6	Japan	0	1	0	1
6	Netherlands	0	1	0	1
6	Switzerland	0	1	0	1
6	United States	0	1	0	1
10	Austria	0	0	1	1
10	Italy	0	0	1	1
10	Russia	0	0	1	1
Totals (12 entries)		6	6	6	18

== Medalists ==
=== Male ===
Event	Gold	Silver	Bronze
Junior (Under 20)
Lead	Eduard Marin Garcia; Spain	Jorg Verhoeven; Netherlands	Fabien Dugit; France
Youth A (Under 18)
Lead	Sean McColl; Canada	Anthony Sapey; Switzerland	Romain Pagnoux; France
Youth B (Under 16)
Lead	Fabien Comina; France	Daniel Woods; United States	Ales Jurjec; Slovenia

=== Female ===
Event	Gold	Silver	Bronze
Junior (Under 20)
Lead	Caroline Ciavaldini; France	Maja Stremfelj; Slovenia	Jenny Lavarda; Italy
Youth A (Under 18)
Lead	Alizée Dufraisse; France	Yuka Kobayashi; Japan	Angela Eiter; Austria
Youth B (Under 16)
Lead	Silvie Rajfova; Czech Republic	Caroline Januel; France	Tatiana Shelemeteva; Russia
