= 2012 IFSC Climbing World Youth Championships =

Competition climbing event

2012 IFSC Climbing World Championships
- Location: Singapore
- Date: 29 August - 1 September 2012

The 2012 IFSC Climbing World Youth Championships (22nd), was held in Singapore from 29 August to 1 September 2012. The competition climbing championships consisted of lead and speed events, for the under 20, under 18, and under 16 age categories.

== Medal table ==
* Host nation (Singapore)

Rank	Nation	Gold	Silver	Bronze	Total
1	Russia	4	5	4	13
2	Austria	1	1	3	5
3	Slovenia	1	1	2	4
4	France	1	1	1	3
4	United States	1	1	1	3
6	Germany	1	0	0	1
6	Italy	1	0	0	1
6	Japan	1	0	0	1
6	Venezuela	1	0	0	1
10	Belgium	0	1	0	1
10	Ecuador	0	1	0	1
10	Sweden	0	1	0	1
13	Great Britain	0	0	1	1
Totals (13 entries)		12	12	12	36

== Medalists ==
=== Male ===
Event	Gold	Silver	Bronze
Junior (Under 20)
Lead	Dmitrii Fakirianov; Russia	Domen Skofic; Slovenia	Jure Raztresen; Slovenia
Speed	Nikita Suyushkin; Russia	Dimitrii Timofeev; Russia	Konstantin Payl; Russia
Youth A (Under 18)
Lead	Sebastian Halenke; Germany	Semen Chesnokov; Russia	Martin Bergant; Slovenia
Speed	Ruslan Faizullin; Italy	Sergei Luzhetskii; Russia	Georgy Artamonov; United States
Youth B (Under 16)
Lead	Anze Peharc; Slovenia	Hannes Puman; Sweden	Georg Parma; Austria
Speed	Aleksandr Shikov; Russia	Danil Zakirov; Russia	Maksim Diachkov; Russia

=== Female ===
Event	Gold	Silver	Bronze
Junior (Under 20)
Lead	Momoka Oda; Japan	Magdalena Röck; Austria	Katharina Posch; Austria
Speed	Anouck Jaubert; France	Esther Bruckner; France	Iuliia Kaplina; Russia
Youth A (Under 18)
Lead	Jessica Pilz; Austria	Anak Verhoeven; Belgium	Salomé Romain; France
Speed	Anna Emets; Russia	Valeria Baranova; Russia	Nina Lach; Austria
Youth B (Under 16)
Lead	Claire Buhrfeind; United States	Margo Hayes; United States	Molly Thompson-Smith; Great Britain
Speed	Leslie Romero; Venezuela	Nicole Mejia; Ecuador	Anastasiia Golikova; Russia
