= 2013 IFSC Climbing World Youth Championships =

Competition climbing event

2013 IFSC Climbing World Championships
- Location: (Canada) Central Saanich
- Date: 15 - 19 August 2013

The 2013 IFSC Climbing World Youth Championships (23rd), was held in Central Saanich, Canada from 15 to 19 August 2013. The competition climbing championships consisted of lead and speed events, for the under 20, under 18, and under 16 age categories.

== Medal table ==
* Host nation (Canada)

Rank	Nation	Gold	Silver	Bronze	Total
1	Russia	5	3	3	11
2	Austria	2	1	1	4
2	Japan	2	1	1	4
4	Italy	2	0	0	2
5	Poland	1	0	0	1
6	France	0	2	2	4
6	United States	0	2	2	4
8	Germany	0	2	0	2
9	Belgium	0	1	0	1
10	Slovenia	0	0	1	1
10	Switzerland	0	0	1	1
10	Ukraine	0	0	1	1
Totals (12 entries)		12	12	12	36

== Medalists ==
=== Male ===
Event	Gold	Silver	Bronze
Junior (Under 20)
Lead	Dmitrii Fakirianov; Russia	Sebastian Halenke; Germany	Domen Skofic; Slovenia
Speed	Nikita Suyushkin; Russia	Artem Savelyev; Russia	Sergei Luzhetskii; Russia
Youth A (Under 18)
Lead	Naoki Shimatani; Japan	Shinichiro Nomura; Japan	Bernhard Röck; Austria
Speed	Alessandro Santoni; Italy	Aleksandr Shikov; Russia	John Brosler; United States
Youth B (Under 16)
Lead	Stefano Carnati; Italy	Hugo Parmentier; France	Sascha Lehmann; Switzerland
Speed	Vladislav Myznikov; Russia	Lev Rudatskiy; Russia	Kostiantyn Pavlenko; Ukraine

=== Female ===
Event	Gold	Silver	Bronze
Junior (Under 20)
Lead	Magdalena Röck; Austria	Katharina Posch; Austria	Manon Hily; France
Speed	Aleksandra Mirosław; Poland	Anouck Jaubert; France	Svetlana Okolnichnikova; Russia
Youth A (Under 18)
Lead	Jessica Pilz; Austria	Anak Verhoeven; Belgium	Julia Chanourdie; France
Speed	Elena Timofeeva; Russia	Kayla Lieuw; United States	Kyra Condie; United States
Youth B (Under 16)
Lead	Aika Tajima; Japan	Emilie Gerhardt; Germany	Miwa Oba; Japan
Speed	Daria Kan; Russia	Margarita Marsanova; United States	Anastasia Manuylova; Russia
