= 2006 IFSC Climbing World Youth Championships =

Competition climbing event

2006 UIAA World Youth Championship
- Location: (Austria) Imst
- Date: 24 - 27 August 2006

The 2006 UIAA World Youth Championship (16th), was held in Imst from 24 to 27 August 2006. The competition climbing championships consisted of lead and speed events, for the under 20, under 18, and under 16 age categories.

== Medal table ==
* Host nation (Austria)

Rank	Nation	Gold	Silver	Bronze	Total
1	Austria*	2	5	2	9
2	Russia	2	3	2	7
3	Canada	2	0	1	3
3	Ukraine	2	0	1	3
5	Spain	2	0	0	2
6	Japan	1	1	0	2
7	France	1	0	2	3
8	United States	0	3	2	5
9	Germany	0	0	1	1
9	Italy	0	0	1	1
Totals (10 entries)		12	12	12	36

== Medalists ==
=== Male ===
Event	Gold	Silver	Bronze
Junior (Under 20)
Lead	Sean McColl; Canada	Thomas Neyer; Austria	Fabian Comina; France
Speed	Sean McColl; Canada	Anatoly Skripov; Russia	Eduard Ismagilov; Russia
Youth A (Under 18)
Lead	Sachi Amma; Japan	Jakob Schubert; Austria	David Lama; Austria
Speed	Maksym Osipov; Ukraine	Egor Skachkov; Russia	Yevgen Palladiy; Ukraine
Youth B (Under 16)
Lead	Eric Lopez Mateos; Spain	Arman Ter-Minasyan; Russia	Mario Lechner; Austria
Speed	Eric Lopez Mateos; Spain	Brian Furciniti; United States	Brian Antheunisse; United States

=== Female ===
Event	Gold	Silver	Bronze
Junior (Under 20)
Lead	Katharina Saurwein; Austria	Anna Stöhr; Austria	Lisa Knoche; Germany
Speed	Olga Bezhko; Ukraine	Anna Stöhr; Austria	Yana Malkova; Russia
Youth A (Under 18)
Lead	Charlotte Durif; France	Akiyo Noguchi; Japan	Anna Hoarau; France
Speed	Yana Chereshneva; Russia	Stefanie Kofler; Austria	Alex Johnson; United States
Youth B (Under 16)
Lead	Johanna Ernst; Austria	Tiffany Hensley; United States	Katie Mah; Canada
Speed	Dinara Fakhritdinova; Russia	Tiffany Hensley; United States	Cassandra Zampar; Italy
