= 2009 IFSC Climbing World Youth Championships =

Competition climbing event

2009 IFSC Climbing World Championships
- Location: (France) Valence
- Date: 27 - 30 August 2009

The 2009 IFSC Climbing World Youth Championships (19th), was held in Valence from 27 to 30 August 2009. The competition climbing championships consisted of lead and speed events, for the under 20, under 18, and under 16 age categories.

== Medal table ==
* Host nation (France)

| Rank | Nation | Gold | Silver | Bronze | Total |
|---|---|---|---|---|---|
| 1 | Russia | 4 | 3 | 2 | 9 |
| 2 | Austria | 2 | 1 | 1 | 4 |
| 3 | France* | 1 | 3 | 2 | 6 |
| 4 | Czech Republic | 1 | 1 | 0 | 2 |
| 5 | Italy | 1 | 0 | 2 | 3 |
| 6 | Germany | 1 | 0 | 1 | 2 |
| 7 | Poland | 1 | 0 | 0 | 1 |
| 7 | Switzerland | 1 | 0 | 0 | 1 |
| 9 | Slovenia | 0 | 2 | 0 | 2 |
| 10 | Ukraine | 0 | 1 | 1 | 2 |
| 11 | Venezuela | 0 | 1 | 0 | 1 |
| 12 | Ecuador | 0 | 0 | 1 | 1 |
| 12 | Spain | 0 | 0 | 1 | 1 |
| 12 | United States | 0 | 0 | 1 | 1 |
| Totals (14 entries) | | 12 | 12 | 12 | 36 |

== Medalists ==
=== Male ===
| Event | Gold | Silver | Bronze |
Junior (Under 20)
| Lead | Jakob Schubert; Austria | Gautier Supper; France | Eric Lopez Mateos; Spain |
| Speed | Sergey Abdrakhmanov; Russia | Josmar Nieves; Venezuela | Stanislav Kokorin; Russia |
Youth A (Under 18)
| Lead | Adam Ondra; Czech Republic | Max Rudigier; Austria | Julian Bautista; United States |
| Speed | Leonardo Gontero; Italy | Arman Ter-Minasyan; Russia | Isaac Estevez; Ecuador |
Youth B (Under 16)
| Lead | Sebastian Halenke; Germany | Domen Skofic; Slovenia | Samuel Adolph; Germany |
| Speed | Nikita Suyushkin; Russia | Artem Savelyev; Russia | Sergei Luzhetskii; Russia |

=== Female ===
| Event | Gold | Silver | Bronze |
Junior (Under 20)
| Lead | Charlotte Durif; France | Ana Ogrinc; Slovenia | Amandine Loury; France |
| Speed | Alina Gaidamakina; Russia | Oleksandra Bud Gusaim; Ukraine | Anastasiya Savisko; Ukraine |
Youth A (Under 18)
| Lead | Katherine Choong; Switzerland | Hélène Janicot; France | Julia Serrière; France |
| Speed | Dinara Fakhritdinova; Russia | Dinara Usmanova; Russia | Anna Gislimberti; Italy |
Youth B (Under 16)
| Lead | Katharina Posch; Austria | Laura Michelard; France | Karoline Sinnhuber; Austria |
| Speed | Aleksandra Mirosław; Poland | Anna Wagnerova; Czech Republic | Michela Facci; Italy |
