= 2007 IFSC Climbing World Youth Championships =

Competition climbing event

2007 IFSC Climbing World Championships
- Location: (Ecuador) Ibarra
- Date: 23 - 26 August 2007

The 2007 IFSC Climbing World Youth Championships (17th), was held in Ibarra from 23 to 26 August 2007. The competition climbing championships consisted of lead and speed events, for the under 20, under 18, and under 16 age categories.

== Medal table ==
* Host nation (Ecuador)

Rank	Nation	Gold	Silver	Bronze	Total
1	Russia	4	5	1	10
2	Austria	3	2	1	6
3	Japan	1	1	1	3
4	France	1	0	2	3
5	Venezuela	1	0	1	2
6	Czech Republic	1	0	0	1
6	Ukraine	1	0	0	1
8	United States	0	1	3	4
9	Ecuador*	0	1	2	3
10	Germany	0	1	1	2
11	Italy	0	1	0	1
Totals (11 entries)		12	12	12	36

== Medalists ==
=== Male ===
Event	Gold	Silver	Bronze
Junior (Under 20)
Lead	Sachi Amma; Japan	Felix Neumärker; Germany	Tsukuru Hori; Japan
Speed	Maksim Osipov; Ukraine	Egor Skachkov; Russia	Sergey Kokorin; Russia
Youth A (Under 18)
Lead	Jakob Schubert; Austria	Mario Lechner; Austria	Thomas Tauporn; Germany
Speed	Sergey Abdrakhmanov; Russia	Gonzalo Mejia; Ecuador	Andres Quinteros; Ecuador
Youth B (Under 16)
Lead	Adam Ondra; Czech Republic	Masahiro Higuchi; Japan	Max Rudigier; Austria
Speed	Andrey Shilenberg; Russia	Bogdan Posmashnyy; Russia	Isaac Estevez; Ecuador

=== Female ===
Event	Gold	Silver	Bronze
Junior (Under 20)
Lead	Christine Schranz; Austria	Yana Chereshneva; Russia	Anne Hoarau; France
Speed	Rosmery Da Silva; Venezuela	Yana Chereshneva; Russia	Anne Hoarau; France
Youth A (Under 18)
Lead	Charlotte Durif; France	Marah Bragdon; United States	Melissa Main; United States
Speed	Kseniya Polekhina; Russia	Alina Gaidamakina; Russia	Tiffany Hensley; United States
Youth B (Under 16)
Lead	Johanna Ernst; Austria	Alexandra Ladurner; Italy	Sasha DiGiulian; United States
Speed	Dinara Fakhritdinova; Russia	Stefanie Pichler; Austria	Rossi Gabazú; Venezuela
