= 2001 IFSC Climbing World Youth Championships =

Competition climbing event

2001 UIAA World Youth Championship
- Location: Imst, Austria
- Date: 21 - 24 June 2001

The 2001 UIAA World Youth Championship (11th), was held in Imst, Austria from 21 to 24 June 2001. The competition climbing championships consisted of the lead event for the under 20, under 18, and under 16 age categories.

== Medal table ==
* Host nation (Austria)

Rank	Nation	Gold	Silver	Bronze	Total
1	Poland	2	0	0	2
2	France	1	1	0	2
3	Czech Republic	1	0	2	3
4	Italy	1	0	0	1
4	Ukraine	1	0	0	1
6	Austria*	0	3	1	4
7	Netherlands	0	1	0	1
7	Slovenia	0	1	0	1
9	Russia	0	0	2	2
10	South Korea	0	0	1	1
Totals (10 entries)		6	6	6	18

== Medalists ==
=== Male ===
Event	Gold	Silver	Bronze
Junior (Under 20)
Lead	Tomáš Mrázek; Czech Republic	Kilian Fischhuber; Austria	Son Sangwon; South Korea
Youth A (Under 18)
Lead	Marcin Wszolek; Poland	Jorg Verhoeven; Netherlands	Petr Solansky; Czech Republic
Youth B (Under 16)
Lead	Guillaume Glairon-Mondet; France	Helmut Wörz; Austria	Jan Zbranek; Czech Republic

=== Female ===
Event	Gold	Silver	Bronze
Junior (Under 20)
Lead	Olga Shalagina; Ukraine	Emilie Pouget; France	Olga Iakoleva; Russia
Youth A (Under 18)
Lead	Jenny Lavarda; Italy	Natalija Gros; Slovenia	Ekaterina Korolkova; Russia
Youth B (Under 16)
Lead	Kinga Ociepka; Poland	Angela Eiter; Austria	Katharina Saurwein; Austria
