= 1999 IFSC Climbing World Youth Championships =

Competition climbing event

1999 UIAA World Youth Championship
- Location: Courmayeur, Italy
- Date: 2 - 3 September 1999

The 1999 UIAA World Youth Championship (9th), was held in Courmayeur, Italy from 2 to 3 September 1999. The competition climbing championships consisted of the lead event for the under 20, under 18, and under 16 age categories.

== Medal table ==
* Host nation (Italy)

Rank	Nation	Gold	Silver	Bronze	Total
1	Slovenia	2	1	0	3
2	France	1	2	1	4
3	Ukraine	1	1	0	2
4	Switzerland	1	0	1	2
5	Italy*	1	0	0	1
6	Poland	0	1	0	1
6	United States	0	1	0	1
8	Austria	0	0	2	2
9	Germany	0	0	1	1
9	Spain	0	0	1	1
11	Netherlands	0	0	0	0
11	Russia	0	0	0	0
Totals (12 entries)		6	6	6	18

== Medalists ==
=== Male ===
Event	Gold	Silver	Bronze
Junior (Under 20)
Lead	Flavio Crespi; Italy	Yves Hasbani; France	Patxi Usobiaga Lakunza; Spain
Youth A (Under 18)
Lead	Tomaz Valjavec; Slovenia	Mykhaylo Shalagin; Ukraine	Kilian Fischhuber; Austria
Youth B (Under 16)
Lead	Roman Felix; Switzerland	Adam Stack; United States	Remi Samyn; France

=== Female ===
Event	Gold	Silver	Bronze
Junior (Under 20)
Lead	Delphine Martin; France	Eva Tusar; Slovenia	Alexandra Eyer; Switzerland
Youth A (Under 18)
Lead	Olga Shalagina; Ukraine	Sandrine Levet; France	Barbara Bacher; Austria
Youth B (Under 16)
Lead	Natalija Gros; Slovenia	Katarzyna Dlugosz; Poland	Nadine Ruh; Germany
