= 2014 IFSC Climbing World Youth Championships =

Competition climbing event

2014 IFSC Climbing World Championships
- Location: (France) Noumea
- Date: 19 - 23 September 2014

The 2014 IFSC Climbing World Youth Championships (24th), was held in Noumea, France from 19 to 23 September 2014. The competition climbing championships consisted of lead and speed events, for the under 20, under 18, and under 16 age categories.

== Medal table ==
* Host nation (France)

Rank	Nation	Gold	Silver	Bronze	Total
1	Russia	4	4	4	12
2	Austria	2	2	2	6
3	United States	1	2	0	3
4	Czech Republic	1	1	0	2
5	Slovenia	1	0	1	2
5	Sweden	1	0	1	2
7	Ecuador	1	0	0	1
7	Japan	1	0	0	1
9	Italy	0	1	2	3
10	Belgium	0	1	0	1
10	Switzerland	0	1	0	1
12	France*	0	0	1	1
12	South Korea	0	0	1	1
Totals (13 entries)		12	12	12	36

== Medalists ==
=== Male ===
Event	Gold	Silver	Bronze
Junior (Under 20)
Lead	Bernhard Röck; Austria	Loïc Timmermans; Belgium	Martin Bergant; Slovenia
Speed	Jan Kriz; Czech Republic	Sergei Luzhetskii; Russia	Alessandro Santoni; Italy
Youth A (Under 18)
Lead	Hannes Puman; Sweden	Jan-Luca Posch; Austria	Georg Parma; Austria
Speed	Aleksandr Shikov; Russia	Lev Rudatskiy; Russia	Vladislav Myznikov; Russia
Youth B (Under 16)
Lead	Kai Lightner; United States	Rudolph Ruana; United States	Lee Minyoung; South Korea
Speed	Carlos Felipe Granja Lopez; Ecuador	Petr Zemliakov; Russia	Gian Luca Zodda; Italy

=== Female ===
Event	Gold	Silver	Bronze
Junior (Under 20)
Lead	Aya Onoe; Japan	Jessica Pilz; Austria	Julia Chanourdie; France
Speed	Svetlana Motovilova; Russia	Andrea Rojas; Ecuador	Alexandra Elmer; Austria
Youth A (Under 18)
Lead	Hannah Schubert; Austria	Alina Ring; Switzerland	Kajsa Rosen; Sweden
Speed	Daria Kan; Russia	Anastasiia Golikova; Russia	Anastasia Manuylova; Russia
Youth B (Under 16)
Lead	Janja Garnbret; Slovenia	Asja Gollo; Italy	Viktoriia Meshkova; Russia
Speed	Ekaterina Barashchuk; Russia	Sidney Trinidad; United States	Elena Krasovskaia; Russia
