= 2002 IFSC Climbing World Youth Championships =

Competition climbing event

2002 UIAA World Youth Championship
- Location: Canteleu, France
- Date: 27 - 28 September 2002

The 2002 UIAA World Youth Championship (12th), was held in Canteleu, France from 27 to 28 September 2002. The competition climbing championships consisted of the lead event for the under 20, under 18, and under 16 age categories.

== Medal table ==
* Host nation (France)

Rank	Nation	Gold	Silver	Bronze	Total
1	France*	1	3	3	7
2	Belgium	1	0	0	1
2	Italy	1	0	0	1
2	Netherlands	1	0	0	1
2	Slovenia	1	0	0	1
2	Switzerland	1	0	0	1
7	Austria	0	1	0	1
7	Czech Republic	0	1	0	1
7	Japan	0	1	0	1
10	South Korea	0	0	1	1
10	Ukraine	0	0	1	1
10	United States	0	0	1	1
13	Russia	0	0	0	0
13	Spain	0	0	0	0
Totals (14 entries)		6	6	6	18

== Medalists ==
=== Male ===
Event	Gold	Silver	Bronze
Junior (Under 20)
Lead	Cédric Lachat; Switzerland	Gérome Pouvreau; France	Fabien Dugit; France
Youth A (Under 18)
Lead	Jorg Verhoeven; Netherlands	Flavien Guerimand; France	Christophe Treulihe; France
Youth B (Under 16)
Lead	Gabriele Moroni; Italy	Stepan Stranik; Czech Republic	Kim Jabee; South Korea

=== Female ===
Event	Gold	Silver	Bronze
Junior (Under 20)
Lead	Natalija Gros; Slovenia	Emilie Pouget; France	Olga Shalagina; Ukraine
Youth A (Under 18)
Lead	Caroline Ciavaldini; France	Angela Eiter; Austria	Stéphanie Crouvisier; France
Youth B (Under 16)
Lead	Chloé Graftiaux; Belgium	Yuka Kobayashi; Japan	Tori Allen; United States
