= 2005 IFSC Climbing World Youth Championships =

Competition climbing event

2005 UIAA World Youth Championship
- Location: (China) Beijing
- Date: 24 - 25 August 2005

The 2005 UIAA World Youth Championship (15th), was held in Beijing from 24 to 25 August 2005. The competition climbing championships consisted of lead and speed events, for the under 20, under 18, and under 16 age categories.

== Medal table ==
* Host nation (China)

Rank	Nation	Gold	Silver	Bronze	Total
1	Russia	4	5	3	12
2	France	2	2	1	5
3	Ukraine	1	1	3	5
4	Austria	1	1	0	2
4	Slovenia	1	1	0	2
6	Australia	1	0	0	1
6	Norway	1	0	0	1
6	Switzerland	1	0	0	1
9	Germany	0	1	1	2
9	United States	0	1	1	2
11	Japan	0	0	2	2
12	Hungary	0	0	1	1
Totals (12 entries)		12	12	12	36

== Medalists ==
=== Male ===
Event	Gold	Silver	Bronze
Junior (Under 20)
Lead	Daniel Winkler; Switzerland	Nicolas Badia; France	Ivan Kaurov; Russia
Speed	Evgenii Vaitsekhovskii; Russia	Alexander Kosterin; Russia	Eduard Ismagilov; Russia
Youth A (Under 18)
Lead	Magnus Midtbø; Norway	Felix Neumärker; Germany	Sachi Amma; Japan
Speed	Alexey Belchikov; Russia	Olexiy Zaychenko; Ukraine	Maksim Osipov; Ukraine
Youth B (Under 16)
Lead	David Lama; Austria	Jakob Schubert; Austria	Yuriy Dzyubyak; Ukraine
Speed	Alexander Stepanov; Russia	Jernej Kruder; Slovenia	Bence Gál; Hungary

=== Female ===
Event	Gold	Silver	Bronze
Junior (Under 20)
Lead	Mina Markovic; Slovenia	Florence Pinet; France	Fanny Conan; France
Speed	Olga Bezhko; Ukraine	Yana Malkova; Russia	Anna Gallyamova; Russia
Youth A (Under 18)
Lead	Caroline Januel; France	Yana Chereshneva; Russia	Akiyo Noguchi; Japan
Speed	Yana Chereshneva; Russia	Alex Johnson; United States	Olena Sheremetyeva; Ukraine
Youth B (Under 16)
Lead	Charlotte Durif; France	Alexandra Malysheva; Russia	Juliane Wurm; Germany
Speed	Libby Hall; Australia	Kseniya Poelekhina; Russia	Tiffany Hensley; United States
