= 2010 IFSC Climbing World Youth Championships =

Competition climbing event

2010 IFSC Climbing World Championships
- Location: (United Kingdom) Edinburgh
- Date: 9 - 12 September 2010

The 2010 IFSC Climbing World Youth Championships (20th), was held in Edinburgh from 9 to 12 September 2010. The competition climbing championships consisted of lead and speed events, for the under 20, under 18, and under 16 age categories.

== Medal table ==
* Host nation (Great Britain)

Rank	Nation	Gold	Silver	Bronze	Total
1	Russia	3	3	4	10
2	Germany	2	1	1	4
3	Poland	1	1	1	3
4	France	1	1	0	2
5	Italy	1	0	2	3
5	Ukraine	1	0	2	3
7	Kazakhstan	1	0	0	1
7	Slovenia	1	0	0	1
7	United States	1	0	0	1
10	Austria	0	3	1	4
11	Belgium	0	2	0	2
12	Switzerland	0	1	0	1
13	Czech Republic	0	0	1	1
Totals (13 entries)		12	12	12	36

== Medalists ==
=== Male ===
Event	Gold	Silver	Bronze
Junior (Under 20)
Lead	Thomas Tauporn; Germany	Mario Lechner; Austria	Anton Mardashov; Ukraine
Speed	Sayat Bokanov; Kazakhstan	Bogdan Posmashnyy; Russia	Arman Ter-Minasyan; Russia
Youth A (Under 18)
Lead	Jure Raztresen; Slovenia	Alexander Megos; Germany	Stefano Ghisolfi; Italy
Speed	Viacheslav Vendechuk; Russia	Marcin Dzienski; Poland	Yaroslav Gontaryk; Ukraine
Youth B (Under 16)
Lead	Sebastian Halenke; Germany	Loïc Timmermans; Belgium	David Firnenburg; Germany
Speed	Georgy Artamonov; Russia	Sergei Luzhetskii; Russia	Alessandro Santoni; Italy

=== Female ===
Event	Gold	Silver	Bronze
Junior (Under 20)
Lead	Alexandra Ladurner; Italy	Manuela Sigrist; Switzerland	Dinara Fakhritdinova; Russia
Speed	Klaudia Buczek; Poland	Anastasia Ermolaeva; Russia	Dinara Usmanova; Russia
Youth A (Under 18)
Lead	Hélène Janicot; France	Katharina Posch; Austria	Magdalena Röck; Austria
Speed	Anna Tsyganova; Russia	Esther Bruckner; France	Aleksandra Mirosław; Poland
Youth B (Under 16)
Lead	Ievgeniia Kazbekova; Ukraine	Anak Verhoeven; Belgium	Andrea Pavlincova; Czech Republic
Speed	Dana Riddle; United States	Alexandra Elmer; Austria	Valeria Baranova; Russia
