= 2000 IFSC Climbing World Youth Championships =

Competition climbing event

2000 UIAA World Youth Championship
- Location: Amsterdam, Netherlands
- Date: 31 August - 1 September 2000

The 2000 UIAA World Youth Championship (10th), was held in Amsterdam, Netherlands from 31 August to 1 September 2000. The competition climbing championships consisted of the lead event for the under 20, under 18, and under 16 age categories.

== Medal table ==
* Host nation (Netherlands)

Rank	Nation	Gold	Silver	Bronze	Total
1	France	1	1	1	3
1	Slovenia	1	1	1	3
3	Austria	1	0	1	2
4	Poland	1	0	0	1
4	Spain	1	0	0	1
4	Switzerland	1	0	0	1
7	Ukraine	0	2	0	2
7	United States	0	2	0	2
9	Canada	0	0	1	1
9	Netherlands*	0	0	1	1
9	Russia	0	0	1	1
Totals (11 entries)		6	6	6	18

== Medalists ==
=== Male ===
Event	Gold	Silver	Bronze
Junior (Under 20)
Lead	Pablo Barbero Alfonso; Spain	Mykhaylo Shalagin; Ukraine	Nels Rosaasen; Canada
Youth A (Under 18)
Lead	Roman Felix; Switzerland	Fabien Dugit; France	Gérome Pouvreau; France
Youth B (Under 16)
Lead	Guillaume Glairon-Mondet; France	Ethan Pringle; United States	Jorg Verhoeven; Netherlands

=== Female ===
Event	Gold	Silver	Bronze
Junior (Under 20)
Lead	Barbara Bacher; Austria	Nastja Guzzi; Slovenia	Jana Oman; Slovenia
Youth A (Under 18)
Lead	Natalija Gros; Slovenia	Olga Shalagina; Ukraine	Barbara Schranz; Austria
Youth B (Under 16)
Lead	Kinga Ociepka; Poland	Emily Harrington; United States	Alexandra Balakireva; Russia
