= Luce Douady =

French climber (2003–2020)

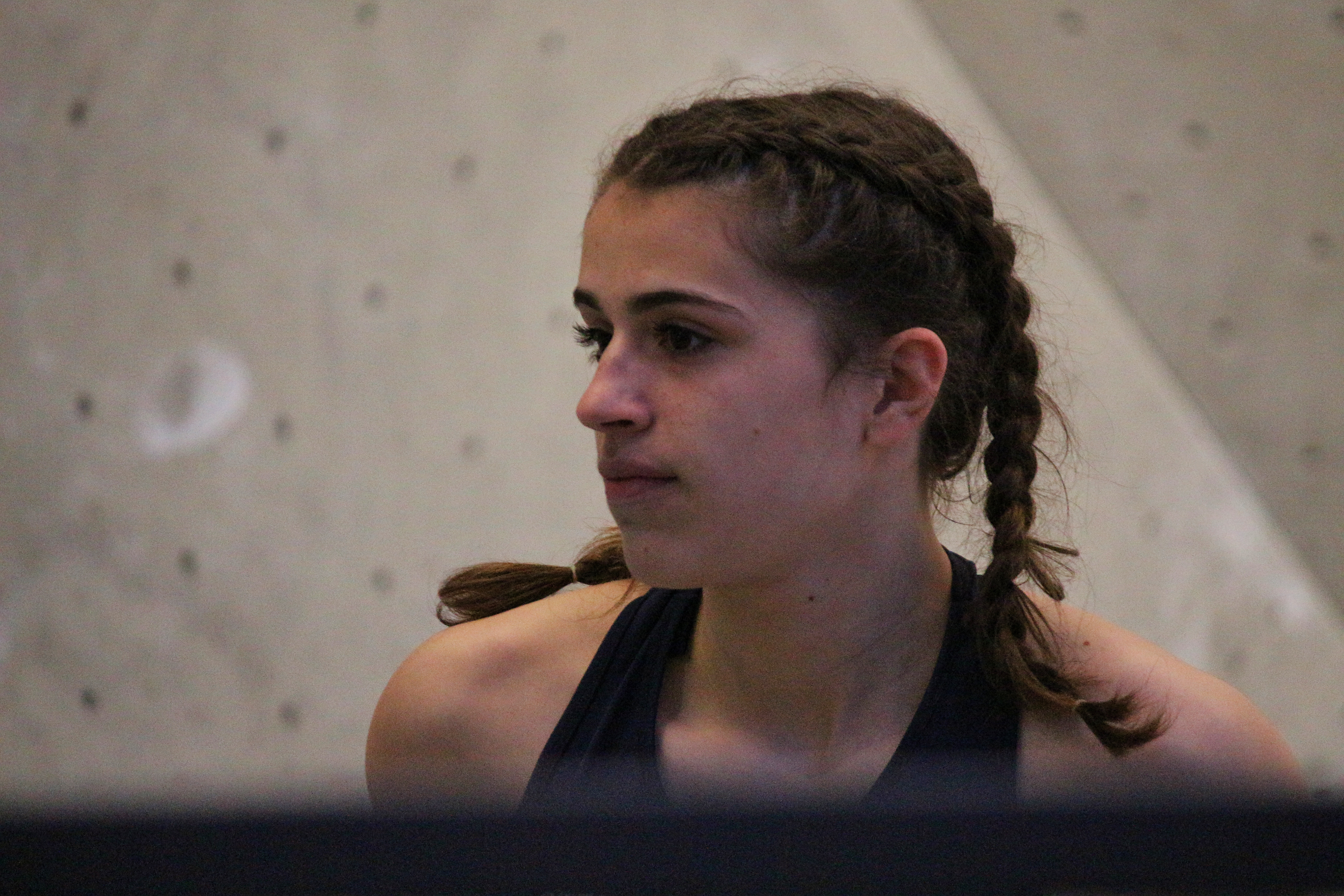
- Douady in 2019
- Born: 17 November 2003; Isère, France
- Died: 14 June 2020 (aged 16); Saint-Pancrasse, France
- Occupation: Climber

Luce Douady (17 November 2003 – 14 June 2020) was a French climber. She made her debut professional appearance on the IFSC Climbing World Cup circuit, where she finished in fifth place, and became youth world champion in 2019. She also won the bronze medal at senior level in the 2019 IFSC Climbing European Championships in Edinburgh.

Douady died on 14 June 2020 at the age of 16, after a fall from an approach path at “Le Luisset – St Pancrasse” in the Isère department of France.

== Biography ==
Luce Douady was born on 17 November 2003, in Le Touvet, on the Petites Roches plateau in Isère. She began climbing at the age of 7 in the TCGM, the Grésivaudan valley club, then joined the Chambéry club at the age of 9, there she practiced this sport at a high level, while joining the Voiron hope centre in 2017, then the French national team in October 2019.

In 2019, at the age of 15, Luce Douady took part in her first senior competition, the European Cup in Innsbruck, and won an unexpected gold medal. Then, at her first Senior World Cup stop in Vail, Colorado, she reached the final with a promising fifth-place finish. Then she became Junior World Bouldering Champion in Arco (Trento, Italy) after winning a bronze medal in the lead event. The same year, she won a bronze medal at the Senior European Championships in the lead event.

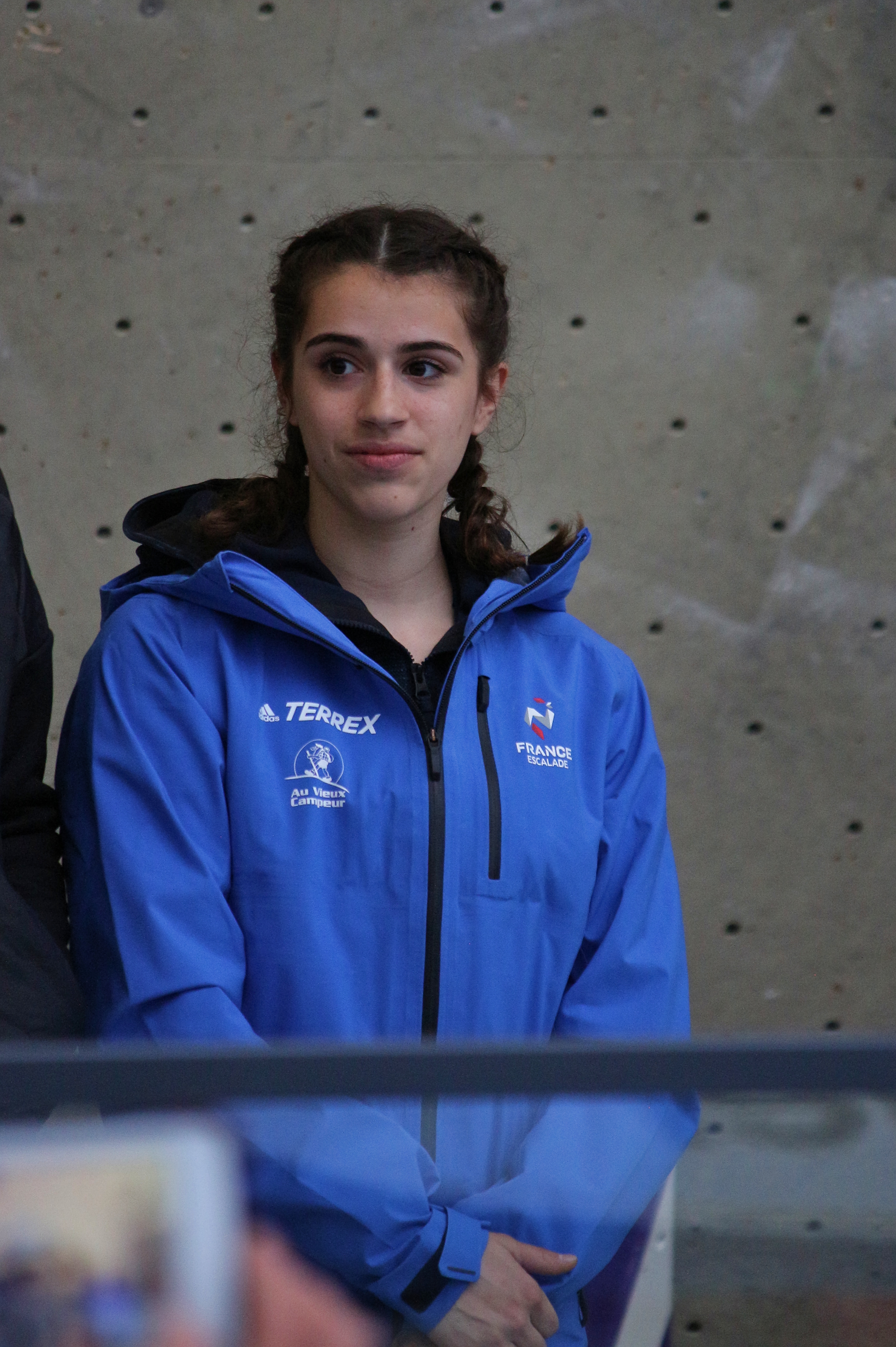
Douady in May 2019

She was part of the "Paris 2024 generation". Also climbing on natural rock, in 2020 she climbed her first 8b+ (according to the French rating).

On 14 June 2020, Luce Douady was part of a climbing group at the climbing site of Saint-Pancrasse, located in the Grésivaudan valley (Isère). On an exposed path linking two sectors and equipped with a handrail, on the edge of the Luisset cliff, near Crolles, she slipped and died after a fall of about 150 metres.
