= 2004 IFSC Climbing World Youth Championships =

Competition climbing event

2004 UIAA World Youth Championship
- Location: (United Kingdom) Edinburgh
- Date: 10 - 12 September 2004

The 2004 UIAA World Youth Championship (14th), was held in Edinburgh from 10 to 12 September 2004. The competition climbing championships consisted of the lead event for the under 20, under 18, and under 16 age categories.

== Medal table ==
* Host nation (Great Britain)

| Rank | Nation | Gold | Silver | Bronze | Total |
|---|---|---|---|---|---|
| 1 | France | 3 | 2 | 2 | 7 |
| 2 | Austria | 1 | 0 | 0 | 1 |
| 2 | Canada | 1 | 0 | 0 | 1 |
| 2 | Netherlands | 1 | 0 | 0 | 1 |
| 5 | Belgium | 0 | 1 | 1 | 2 |
| 6 | Bulgaria | 0 | 1 | 0 | 1 |
| 6 | Spain | 0 | 1 | 0 | 1 |
| 6 | Switzerland | 0 | 1 | 0 | 1 |
| 9 | Czech Republic | 0 | 0 | 1 | 1 |
| 9 | Russia | 0 | 0 | 1 | 1 |
| 9 | United States | 0 | 0 | 1 | 1 |
| Totals (11 entries) | | 6 | 6 | 6 | 18 |

== Medalists ==
=== Male ===
| Event | Gold | Silver | Bronze |
Junior (Under 20)
| Lead | Jorg Verhoeven; Netherlands | Eduard Marin Garcia; Spain | Dmitrii Sharafutdinov; Russia |
Youth A (Under 18)
| Lead | Sean McColl; Canada | Ivan Kaurov; Russia | Fabien Comina; France |
Youth B (Under 16)
| Lead | David Lama; Austria | Blagovest Lazarov; Bulgaria | Daniel Woods; United States |

=== Female ===
| Event | Gold | Silver | Bronze |
Junior (Under 20)
| Lead | Caroline Ciavaldini; France | Florence Pinet; France | Stéphanie Crouvisier; France |
Youth A (Under 18)
| Lead | Caroline Januel; France | Maud Ansade; France | Chloé Graftiaux; Belgium |
Youth B (Under 16)
| Lead | Charlotte Durif; France | Christina Schmid; Switzerland | Silvie Rajfova; Czech Republic |
