= Alizée Dufraisse =

French rock climber (born 1987)

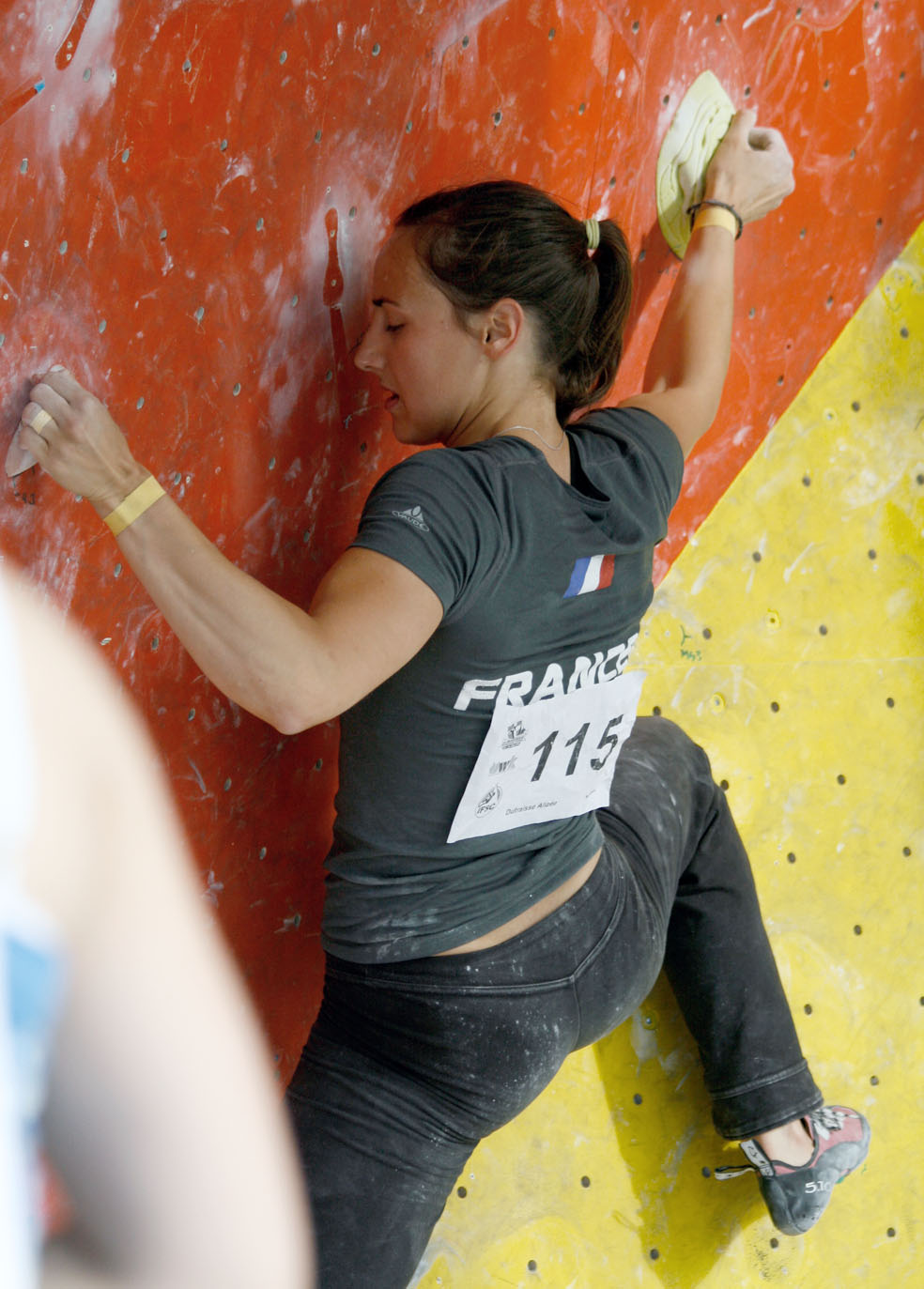
- Alizee Dufraisse in qualifying at the Boulderin Worldcup in Vienna, Austria, May 28, 2010

Personal information
- Born: 13 June 1987 (age 39) Pessac, France
- Height: 164 cm (5 ft 5 in)
- Weight: 46 kg (101 lb)
- Website: Alizée Dufraisse

Climbing career
- Type of climber: Competition lead climbing; Competition bouldering; Sport climbing; Bouldering
Medal record
Women's competition climbing
Representing France
IFSC European Championships
Bronze medal – third place	2010 Imst/Innsbruck	Lead
- Updated on 10 May 2013

Alizée Dufraisse (born 13 June 1987 in Pessac, France) is a French professional rock climber who specializes in competition lead climbing and competition bouldering, and also in outdoor sport climbing.

== Climbing career ==
=== Rock climbing ===
Dufraisse has been climbing since the age of seven. In 2003, she first redpointed the sport climbing grade of 8a (5.13b).

In January 2012, she climbed the sport climbing route, La Reina Mora 8c+/9a , which had been only climbed by Ramón Julián Puigblanque, Daniel Andrada, and Nicolas Favresse, and was considered to be close to a full 9a, which would have been the fourth-ever female ascent of a 9a in history).

=== Competition climbing ===
In 2008, she was a gold medalist in the French competition climbing championship. In 2009, she won the bouldering competition at Rock Master. In 2010, she won a bronze medal at the European Championships in Imst Austria.

== Personal life ==
Dufraisse is also interested in other sports, including the pole vault.

She lives in Aix-en-Provence.
