= Johanna Ernst =

Austrian rock climber (born 1992)

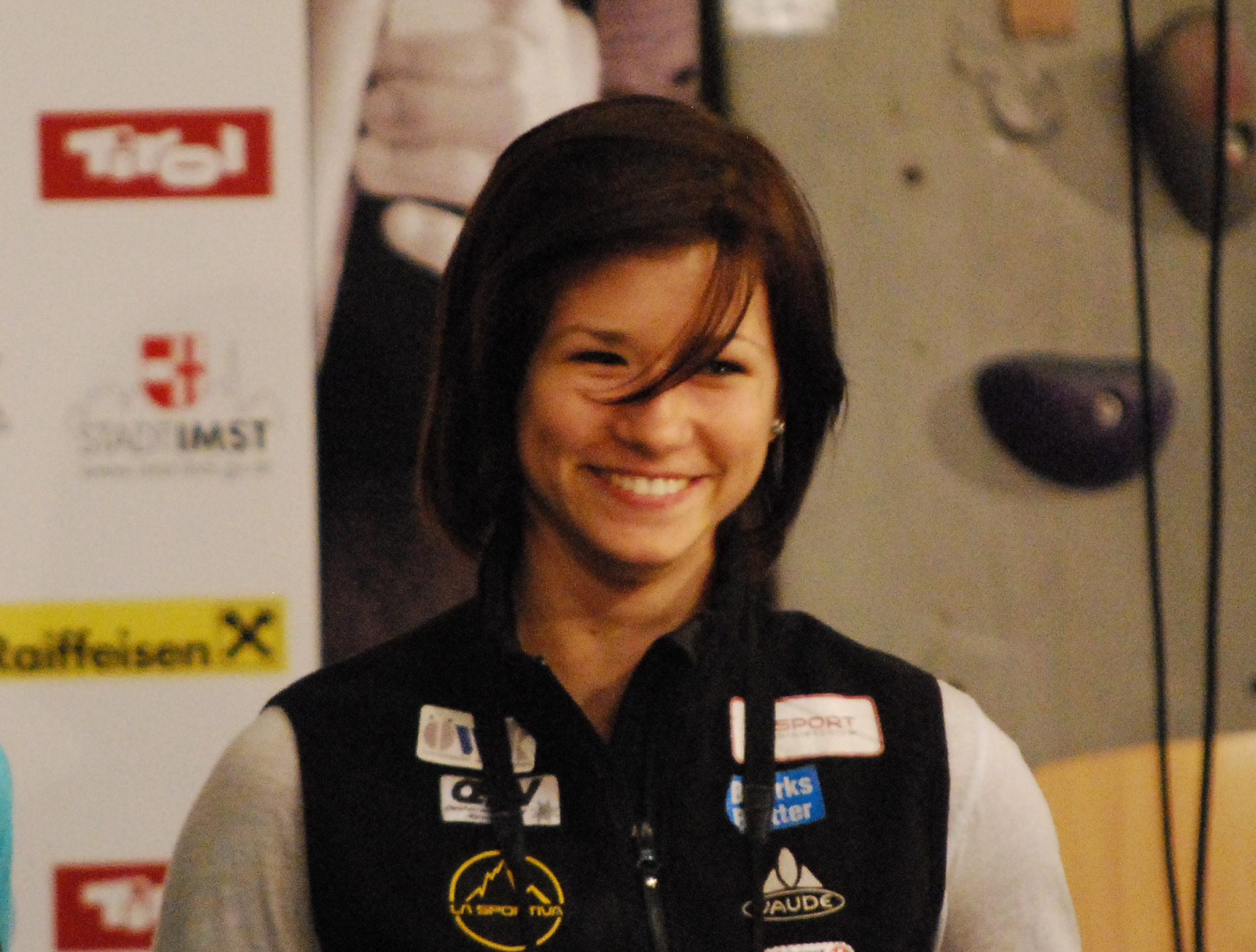
- Johanna Ernst in Imst, 2009

Personal information
- Nationality: Austrian
- Born: 16 November 1992 (age 33) Mittersill, Austria
- Occupation: Professional rock climber
- Height: 158 cm (5 ft 2 in)
- Weight: 48 kg (106 lb)
- Website: www.johanna-ernst.at

Climbing career
- Type of climber: Competition climbing; Sport climbing
- Highest grade: Redpoint: 8c+ (5.14c); Onsight/Flash: 8b (5.13d)
- Known for: Winning the World Cup twice, and the World Championships once.
Medal record
Women's competition climbing
Representing Austria
World Championships
Gold medal – first place	2009 Xining	Lead
Bronze medal – third place	2012 Paris	Lead
World Cup
Winner	2008	Lead
Winner	2009	Lead
Second place	2008	Combined
Third place	2009	Combined
Third place	2012	Lead
European Championships
Gold medal – first place	2008	Lead
Silver medal – second place	2010	Lead
- Updated on 3 November 2017

Johanna Ernst (born 16 November 1992) is an Austrian professional rock climber who specialises in competition lead climbing, competition bouldering and outdoor sport climbing.

== Climbing career ==
=== Competition climbing ===
Ernst began climbing when she was 8 years old. Initially, she only competed in the competition lead climbing discipline. In 2008, when she was 16, she participated in her first Lead Climbing World Cup and won it, earning three gold, two silver and one bronze medals. In the same year she also won the Rock Master climbing festival and the Lead Climbing European Championship in Paris.

In 2009, she won the Lead Climbing World Championships in Qinghai and, for the second time in a row, the Lead Climbing World Cup. As a decoration of honor for these outstanding achievements, in 2009 she was also awarded the Gold Medal for Services to the Republic of Austria.

In 2010, she could not compete in the Lead Climbing World Cup due to an ankle sprain caused by a fall during the Bouldering World Cup on June 4 in Vail. She went on to earn a silver medal at the European Championships in Imst.

== Rankings ==
=== Climbing World Cup ===
Discipline	2008	2009	2010	2011	2012
Lead	1	1	-	6	3
Bouldering	30	22	28	-	-
Speed	-	-	-	-	-
Combined	2	3	-	-	-

=== Climbing World Championships ===
Discipline	2009	2011	2012
Lead	1	4	3

=== Climbing European Championships ===
Discipline	2008	2010	2013
Lead	1	2	19

== Number of medals in the Climbing World Cup ==
=== Lead ===
Season	Gold	Silver	Bronze	Total
2008	3	2	1	6
2009	3		1	4
2011	2			2
2012	1	2	1	4
Total	9	4	3	16

== Rock climbing ==
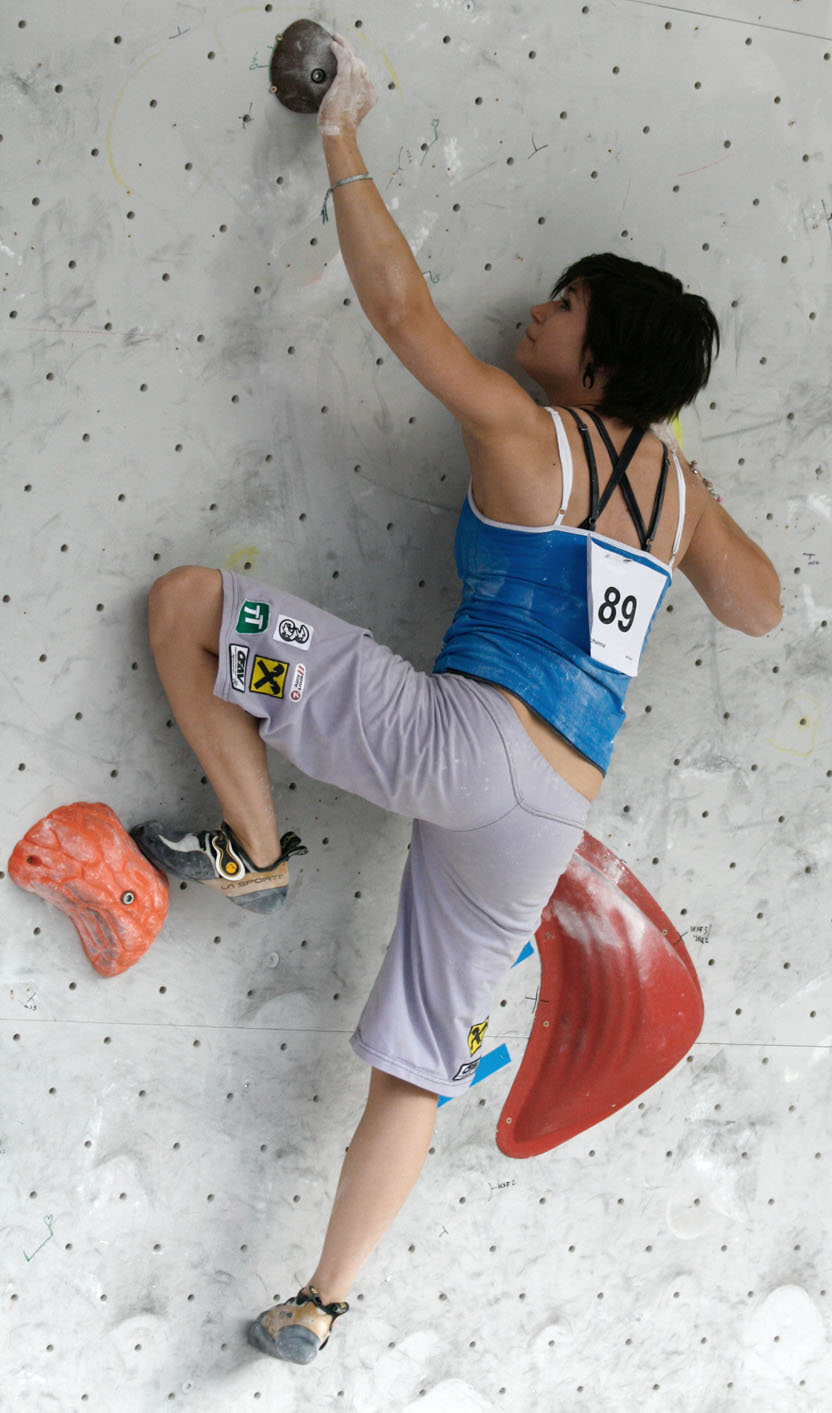
Johanna competing at the 2010 World Cup event in Wien.

=== Redpointed routes ===
8c+ (5.14c):

- Open your Mind - Santa Linya (ESP) - 6 April 2012

8c (5.14b):

- La Fabelita - Santa Linya (ESP) - 5 April 2012
- Wallstreet - Frankenjura (GER) - 11 August 2014

8b+b :

- Minas Tirith - Ötztal (AUT) - 7 August 2008

=== Onsighted routes ===
8b (5.13d):

- Santa Linya - Santa Linya (ESP) - 3 April 2009

8a+ (5.13c):

- La Mare del Tano - Santa Linya (ESP) - 3 April 2009
- Flix Flax - Terradets (ESP) - 1 April 2009
- White Winds - Schleierwasserfall (AUT) - 30 March 2008
