= Domen Škofic =

Slovenian rock climber

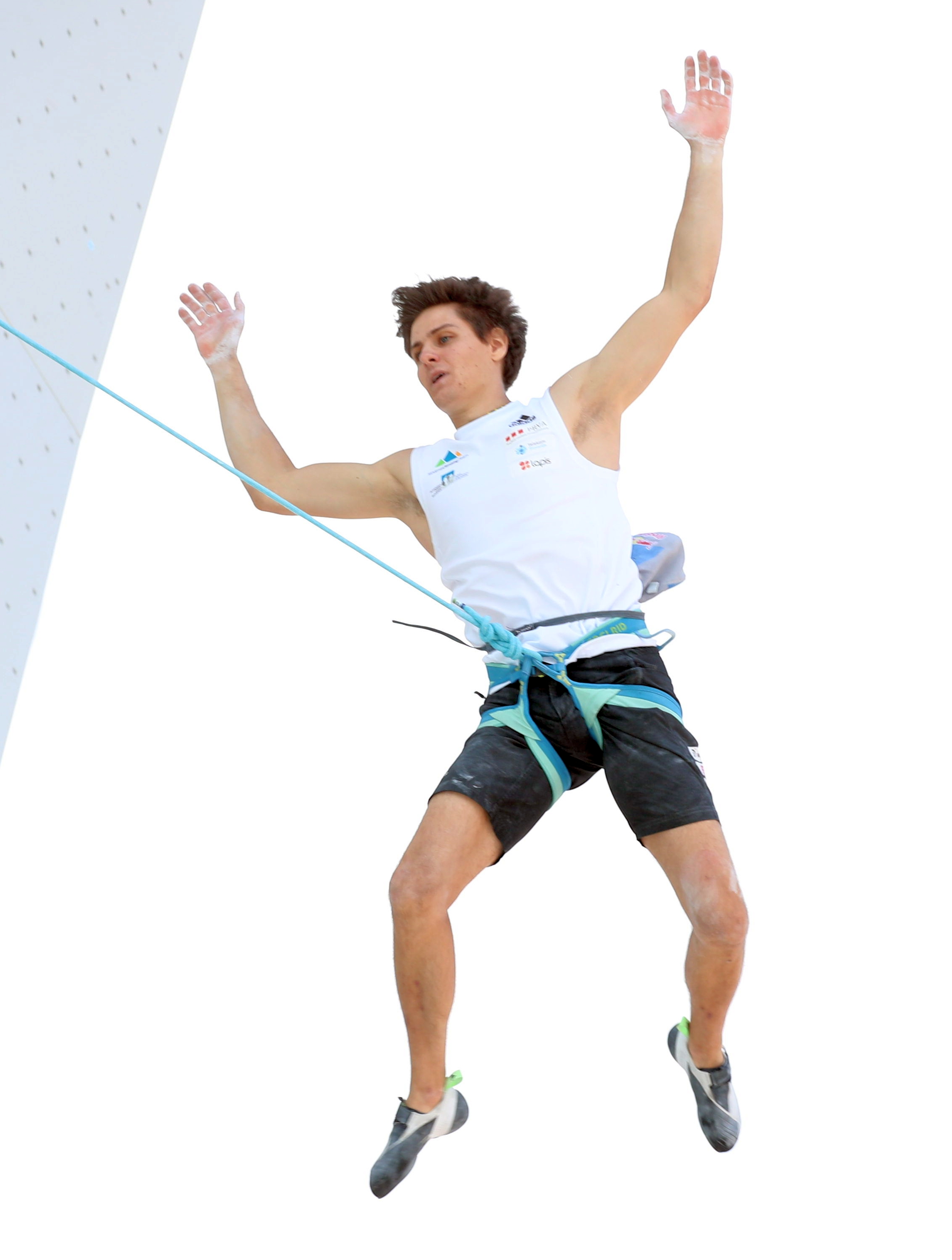
- Škofic in 2022

Personal information
- Nationality: Slovenian
- Born: 11 April 1994 (age 32) Ljubljana, Slovenia
- Occupation: Professional sport climber
- Height: 176 cm (5 ft 9 in)
- Weight: 62 kg (137 lb)

Climbing career
- Type of climber: Competition climbing; Sport climbing
- Highest grade: Redpoint: 9a+ (5.15a); Onsight/Flash: 8c+ (5.14c)
- Known for: Winning Lead Climbing World Cup in 2016
Medal record
Men's competition climbing
Representing Slovenia
World Cup
Third place	2014	Combined
Third place	2015	Combined
Winner	2016	Lead
Third place	2018	Lead
World Championships
Silver medal – second place	2009	Youth Lead
Silver medal – second place	2012	Juniors Lead
Bronze medal – third place	2013	Juniors Lead
European Championships
Gold medal – first place	2012	Juniors Lead
Bronze medal – third place	2013	Juniors Lead
- Updated on 30 October 2018

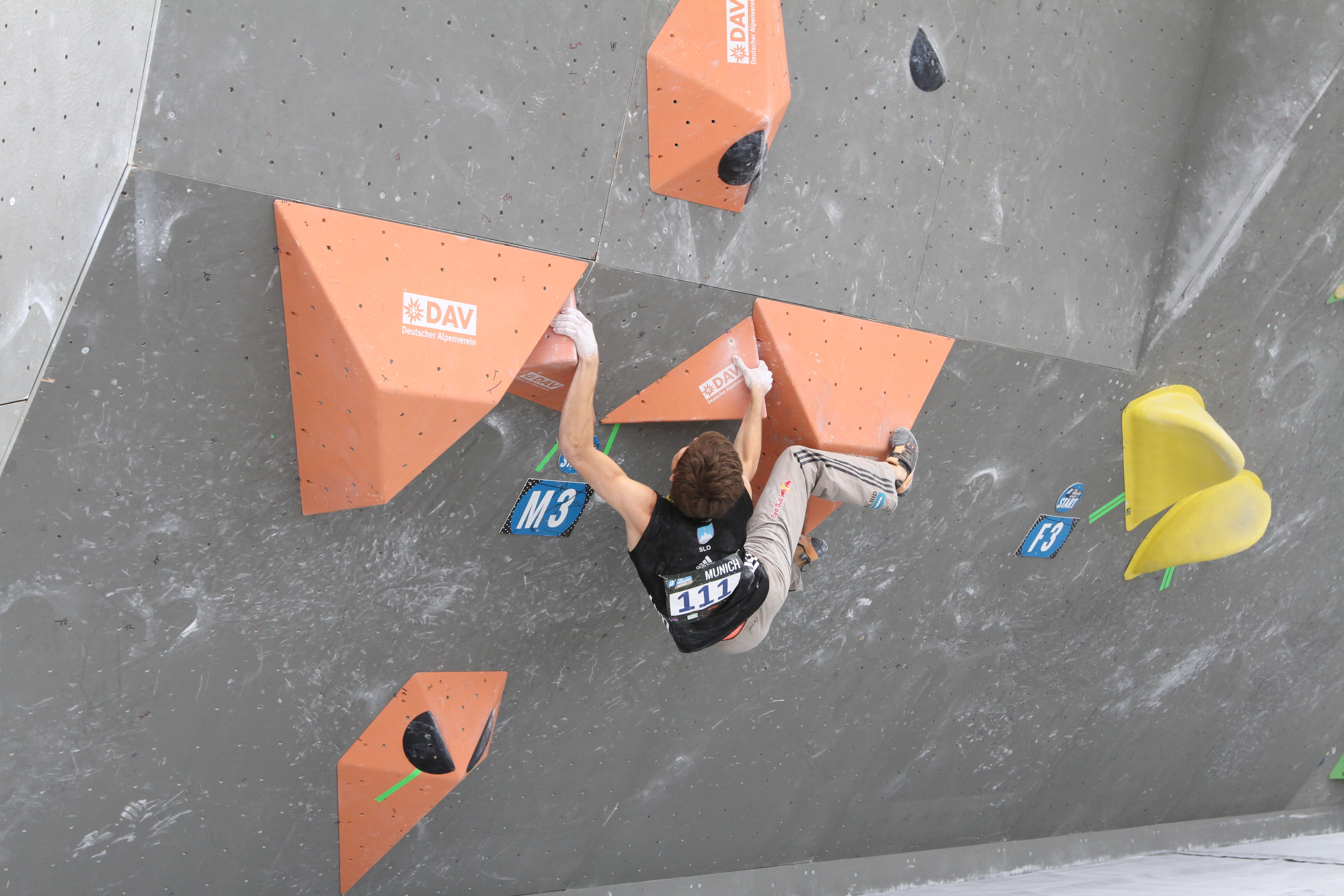
Domen Škofic, 2015

Domen Škofic (born 11 April 1994, in Ljubljana) is a Slovenian rock climber who specializes in competition climbing and also outdoor sport climbing. In 2016, he won the IFSC Climbing World Cup in competition lead climbing.

== Rankings ==
=== Climbing World Cup ===
Discipline	2010	2011	2012	2013	2014	2015	2016	2017	2018
Lead	32	15	15	9	5	4	1	4	3
Bouldering	-	60	-	86	58	20	-	70	-
Speed	-	-	-	-	-	-	-	-	-
Combined	-	6	-	7	3	3	-	17	-

=== Climbing World Championships ===
Youth

Discipline	2009 Youth B	2010 Youth A	2011 youth A	2012 Juniors	2013 Juniors
Lead	2	5	1	2	3

Adult

Discipline	2011	2012	2014	2016
Lead	26	16	4	4
Bouldering	-	-	37	-
Speed	-	-	35	-
Combined	-	-	5	-

=== Climbing European Championships ===
Youth

Discipline	2012 Juniors	2013 Juniors
Lead	1	3

Adult

Discipline	2013	2015	2017
Lead	11	9	5
Bouldering	-	15	-
Speed	-	-	40

=== Rock Master ===
Discipline	2016
Duel	4

== Number of medals in the Climbing European Youth Cup ==
=== Lead ===
Season	Category	Gold	Silver	Bronze	Total
2011	Youth A	3			3
2012	Juniors	6			6
Total		9	0	0	9

== Number of medals in the Climbing World Cup ==
=== Lead ===
Season	Gold	Silver	Bronze	Total
2014		1	2	3
2015	1	1	1	3
2016	3	1		4
2017		1		1
2018	1		2	3
Total	5	4	5	14
