= Charles Cole =

Charles Cole may refer to:

== People ==
- Charles A. Cole, member of the 130th New York State Legislature
- Charles C. Cole (New York), member of the 118th New York State Legislature
- Charles Cleaves Cole (1841–1905), U.S. federal judge
- Charlie Cole (lawyer) (Charles E. Cole, born 1927), attorney general of Alaska
- Charles H. Cole (1871–1952), American military and political figure
- Charles H. Cole (banker) (1847–1906), American banker
- Charles Nelson Cole, dean of Oberlin College; father of the biophysicist Kenneth Stewart Cole
- Tom Cole (writer) (Charles Thomas Cole, 1933–2009), playwright and screenwriter
- Charles W. Cole (1906–1978), president of Amherst College and U.S. ambassador to Chile
- Charles Cole, shoe manufacturer, founder and president of Five Ten Footwear
- Charles Cole (climber) (1955–2018), American rock climber, inventor, and entrepreneur
- Charles Octavius Cole (1814–1858), American painter

== Other uses ==
- Buddy Cole (character) (Charles Budderick Cole), a fictional character created by the actor-comedian Scott Thompson
- SS Charles N. Cole, a Liberty ship

== See also ==
- Charlie Cole (disambiguation)
- Charles Coles (disambiguation)
