= BFL Climbing Combine =

Climbing athletic assessment and scouting event

- Official BFL Climbing Combine logo
- Venue: BFL Facility
- Date: Annual
- Website: climbingcombine.com

BFL Climbing Combine (short for Beast Fingers League Climbing Combine) is a United States-based single-day athletic assessment event focused on competition climbing. Founded in 2021 by Beast Fingers Climbing, the Combine was established to provide standardized, data-driven evaluation for climbers preparing for national and international climbing competitions. Modeled in part after the NFL Scouting Combine, the BFL applies performance analytics to assess climbers across multiple physical and climbing-specific disciplines, helping to identify talent within youth and elite climbing pipelines.

== Overview ==
Held annually, the BFL Climbing Combine evaluates athletes using a series of strength, power, and control-based tests. These include bench press maximums, weighted pull-ups, front lever holds, vertical jump, and isometric compression challenges. It also features climbing-specific tools such as the proprietary Grippul, which measures finger force production on narrow edges. The scoring system normalizes output based on strength-to-weight ratio, allowing for comparison across a wide range of body types and demographics.

It has featured climbers from Team USA, Olympic-climbing athletes including Natalia Grossman, and nationally ranked youth competitors. Broadcast coverage has included streaming partnerships with YouTube and EpicTV Europe, making the event accessible to a growing audience of coaches, scouts, and fans of competitive climbing.

== History ==
BFL Climbing Combine was founded in Denver, Colorado in 2021 by Aman Anderson of Beast Fingers Climbing. The intent was to address the lack of standardized evaluation in the sport of climbing. The combine has grown into a recognized tool in US climbing. BFL has established a presence in urban sports culture and streaming.

The BFL Climbing Combine has received support from major climbing hold brands including, Kilter Grips, athletic brands, Gatorade, which awarded a Community Grant in 2024, and Adidas Terrex from 2021-2024, and upon change of contract, Adidas Five Ten Footwear for 2025. to expand event infrastructure and athlete support. Additional backing has come from local gyms and training gear manufacturers.

Beast Fingers Climbing and its BFL Combine have received attention from major publications, including The Denver Post and Climbing Magazine for their efforts to increase diversity and athletic development in underserved communities. Anderson established Beast Fingers Climbing in Globeville, Denver neighborhood to serve underprivileged youth, aiming to diversify sport climbing.

In early 2023, Beast Fingers Climbing faced the threat of eviction due to rising rental costs and financial strain exacerbated by the COVID-19 pandemic. The situation gained attention from both the local and national climbing communities, prompting an outpouring of support. Adidas and community members provided critical funding, allowing the gym and the BFL to continue operations.

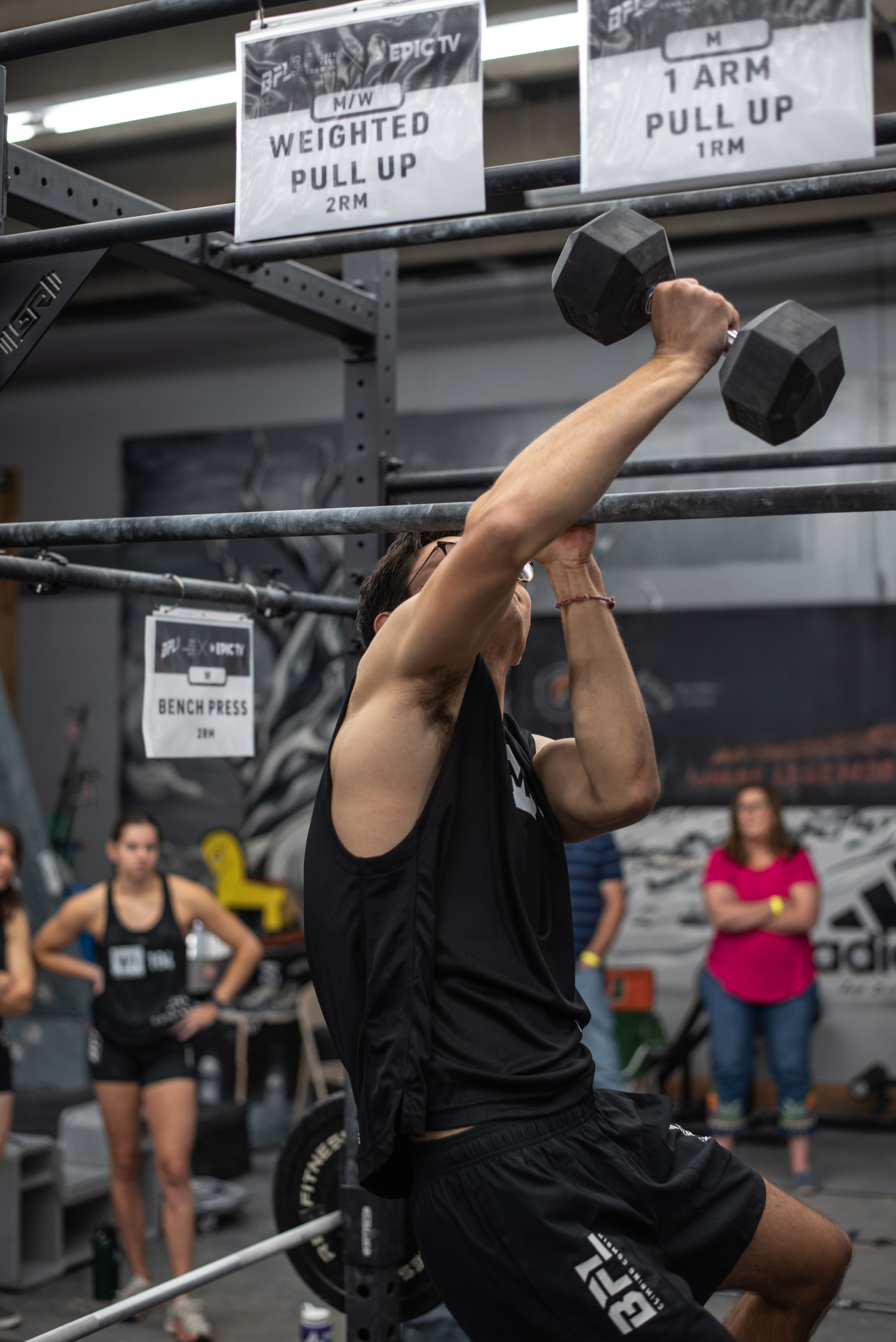
Noah Wheeler performs one-arm pull up at the 2023 BFL3 Climbing Combine.

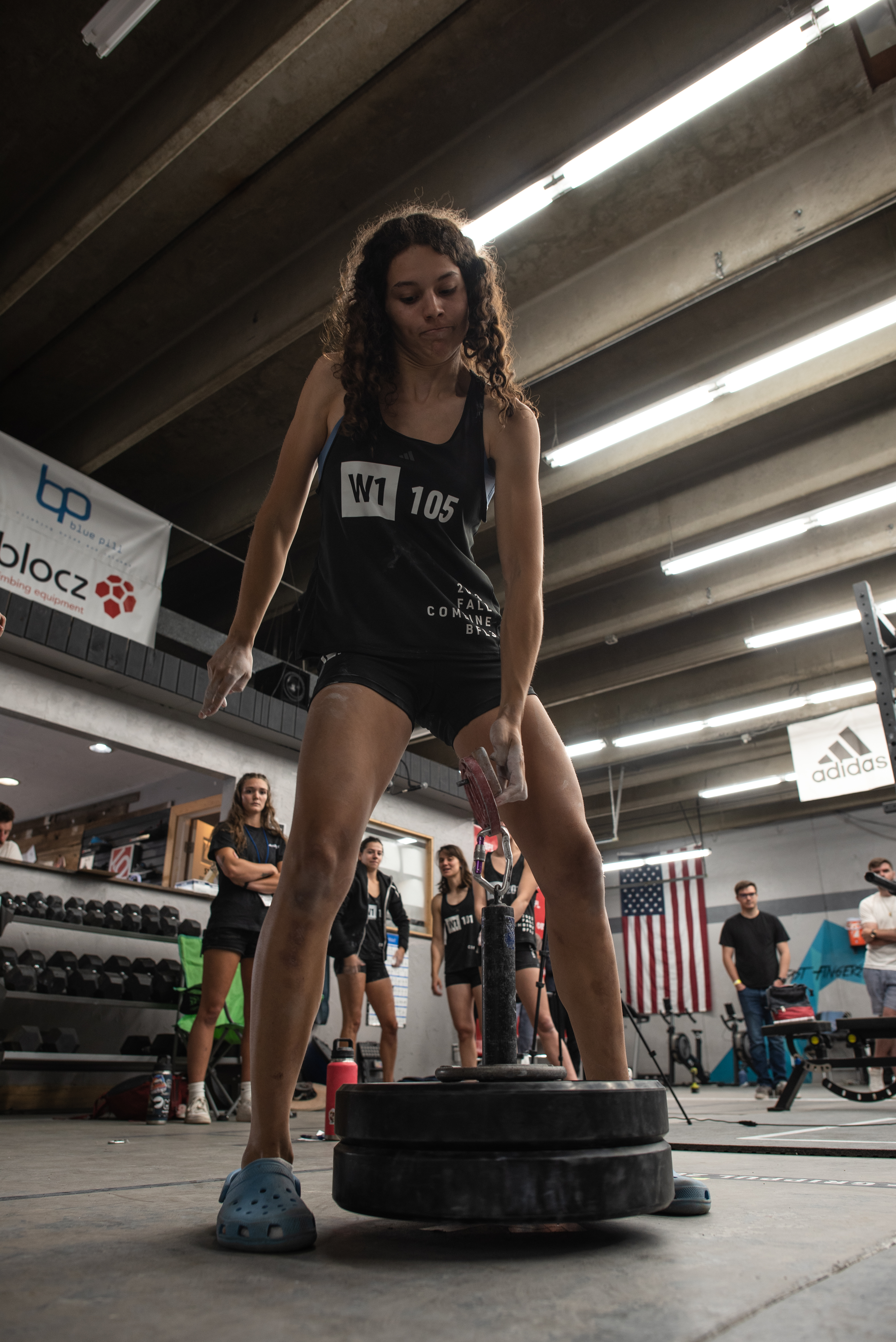
Sonia Gutierrez hand grip assessment at the BFL Climbing Combine, using a no-hang finger strength assessment.

== Testing events ==
The 2021 format was high-volume and emphasized raw output across standard calisthenics. Metrics like "Reps" and "Seconds" dominated, with some innovation introduced via the Grippul and Compression Box. This laid the groundwork for performance-based standardization in the following BFL 2-4, for athlete safety, and to allow athletes to have more energy for each skilled event, including the 4 skill competition boulders to be climbed after.

The combine features unique climbing-specific drills:

- Bench Press 2RM (% body weight) Athletes perform a two-repetition maximum bench press. The score is calculated as a ratio of the lifted weight to the athlete's body weight, emphasizing relative strength.
- Front Lever hold (seconds) Athletes hold a horizontal front lever position for as long as possible. The duration is recorded, with longer holds indicating greater core and shoulder strength.
- Grippul Lift (grip test) This test measures finger strength by having athletes lift weight using a 20mm edge. The score is the lifted weight divided by body weight, highlighting grip strength efficiency.
- Weighted Pull-Up (% body weight) Athletes perform pull-ups with added weight. The score is the additional weight lifted divided by body weight, assessing upper body pulling strength.
- Vertical Jump (inches) Measures explosive leg power by recording the height of a vertical jump.
- 1-Arm Weighted Lift This evaluates unilateral pulling strength. Athletes perform a pull-up with one arm while holding additional weight in the other hand. The score is the added weight divided by body weight.
- Hollow Body Hold (for women) This core endurance test requires athletes to maintain a hollow body position. The time held is recorded, reflecting core stability and endurance.

Tests are derived from academic research and climbing biomechanics.

== Athlete evaluation ==
The BFL Climbing Combine is an annual athletic evaluation and scouting event for competitive rock climbers. Its assessment model was developed along with Anderson and KörperForce, whose focus on neuromuscular efficiency, relative strength, and performance diagnostics, laid the groundwork for a new framework in climbing-specific testing, forming the basis of the BFL Combine's evaluation system. The combine includes standardized drills and scoring protocols that measure grip strength, explosive power, and body control—providing data-driven insights for athlete development and scouting.

=== Scoring system ===
The BFL Climbing Combine uses a strength-to-weight ratio model to evaluate athletes. Most events are normalized by dividing the athlete's performance by their body weight.

Example formula:

S = MaxLift / BodyWeight

Raw metrics such as jump height or hold time are used directly when appropriate.

=== Ranking Algorithm ===
Athletes are ranked based on a cumulative score from all events:

T = S_{1} + S_{2} + ... + S_{n}

Where:

- T is the total score
- S_{1} to S_{n} are normalized scores from individual events (e.g., bench press ratio, grippul ratio)

The athlete with the highest total score is awarded Rank 1.

Example calculation:

- Bench Ratio = 1.30
- Grippul Ratio = 1.10
- 1-Arm Pull-Up Ratio = 0.20

T = 1.30 + 1.10 + 0.20 = 2.60

This approach emphasizes relative strength, power, and efficiency across climbers of different body types.

== Broadcast coverage ==
- BFL 1–2 were streamed on the Beast Fingers YouTube Channel
- BFL 3–4 were exclusively streamed via EpicTV Europe for International Coverage

== Notable athletes ==
Athletes from BFL who have gone on to Team USA , international events, or notable ascents include:

- Adriene Akiko Clark – USA Climbing National Team Member
- Natalia Grossman – Olympian, and USA Climbing National Team Member
- Drew Ruana – USA Climbing National Team Member, Multiple v16/v17
- Noah Wheeler – USA Climbing National Team Member, Multiple v16/v17

== Results Summary ==
=== Men's Results ===
2021 BFL Combine Results

Name	Weight	Bench Press (Reps)	Flying Ladder (Reps)	Front Lever (s)	Front Lever Rank	1 Arm Pull Up (Reps)	Grippul Lift (STW%)	Weighted Pull-ups (Reps)	Compression (s)	Compression Rank	Overall Score
Drew Ruana	130	22	5	5.09	11	8	115	18	19.44	8	211.53
John McNamara	135	23	5	1.94	8	8	107	10	21.59	10	203.53
Cooper Bastian	164	24	5	5.62	10	3	107	17	22.15	6	199.77
Zander Waller	162	29	8	11.85	3	3	108	10	23.53	5	201.38
Brenden Killian	155	26	4	4.57	7	4	94	17	29.34	4	189.91
Derek New	138	8	4	23.41	9	3	109	8	32.56	11	207.97
Austin Weber	117	7	5	9.06	1	2	112	10	37.56	9	192.62
Shane Fedorov	143	14	5	29.49	6	1	100	11	39.25	3	208.74
Owen Dejohn	127	15	5	1.93	6	1	98	13	40.75	7	173.68
Alex Johnson	165	21	3	12.75	4	2	104	13	41.19	1	182.94
Daniel Frandson	155	11	2	19.78	2	1	87	7	51.22	2	183

2022 BFL Combine Results

Name	Weight (lb)	Bench Max (lb)	Bench % BW	Flying Ladder (Reps)	Front Lever (s)	Grippul Lift (lb)	Grippul % BW	Vertical Jump (in)	Weighted Pull-Up (lb)	Weighted % BW	Compression (s)	1-Arm Pull-Up (Reps)
Derek New	140.85	135	61.23	5	32.28	150	1.06	25	100	45.36	53.67	6
Drew Ruana	135	215	97.52	5	32.63	165	1.22	29	165	74.85	56.65	8
Zach Galla	136	185	83.91	5	17.84	166	1.22	28	135	61.23	38.42	9
Toinon Beigne	141	180	81.65	6	10.3	108	0.77	27	120	54.43	47.4	4
Zander Waller	166	235	106.59	6	10.31	185	1.11	30	135	61.23	37.76	5
Austin Weber	125	135	61.23	5	8.36	140	1.12	28	70	31.75	17.54	2
Jonathan Ruana	140	210	95.25	3	4.5	120	0.86	27	90	40.82	17.51	0
Hank Gaylord	142.4	155	70.31	4	10.65	160	1.12	26	120	54.43	44.37	6
Matt Dyer	167	195	88.45	3	15.03	140	0.83	26	70	31.75	20.56	0

2023 BFL Combine Results

Name	Height	Weight (lb)	Bench Max	Bench % BW	Front Lever (s)	Grippul Lift (lb)	Grippul % BW	Vertical Jump (in)	Weighted Pull-Up 2RM (lb)	Weighted 2RM % BW	1 Arm Max (lb)	1 Arm % BW	Dragon Squat	Points
Noah Wheeler	5'11"	150.5	165	1.096	8:19	175	1.127	26	135	0.90	0	0	3	3
Ben Wheeler	5'11"	155	DNF	DNF	DNF	DNF	DNF	DNF	DNF	DNF	DNF	DNF	DNF	
Conor Wellman	—	—	DNF	DNF	DNF	DNF	DNF	DNF	DNF	DNF	DNF	DNF	DNF	
Gunner Autterson	5'7"	170.3	205	1.204	5:43	170	0.999	34	115	0.658	5	0.029	2	2
Derek New	5'9"	146.5	210	1.197	16:09	150	1.022	28	135	0.78	5	0.034	2	2
Drew Ruana	5'7"	136.3	175	1.284	16:09	165	1.210	28	135	0.95	30	0.220	3	3
Eugene Uhm	5'7"	130	145	1.115	1:59	145	1.115	28	80	0.615	5	0.038	2	2
Gabe Krzykwa	5'7"	175.35	210	1.197	3:13	150	0.855	28	135	0.77	5	0.028	2	2

2024 BFL Combine Results

Name	Height (cm)	Weight (lb)	Bench Max (lb)	Bench % BW	Front Lever (s)	Grippul Lift (lb)	Grippul % BW	Vertical Jump (cm)	Weighted Pull-Up 2RM (lb)	Weighted 2RM % BW	1-Arm (lb)	1-Arm % BW
Noah Wheeler	180.3	165	165	1.00	13	180	1.09	74	140	0.85	25	0.15
Jacob Iarussi	172.72	174	275	1.58	11	175	1.01	51	160	0.92	20	0.11
Aiden Gloyd	177.8	149	165	1.11	1	170	1.14	66	95	0.64	15	0.10
Gunner Autterson	180.3	161	215	1.34	11	175	1.09	86	100	0.62	5	0.03
Francesco Military	177.8	166	225	1.36	8	180	1.08	82	135	0.81	30	0.18
Drew Ruana	170.18	145	195	1.34	20.4	155	1.07	68	145	1.00	30	0.21
Austin Reitz	180.3	135	155	1.15	2	155	1.15	64	90	0.67	17.5	0.13

2025 BFL Combine Results

Name	Height (cm)	Weight (lb)	Bench Max (lb)	Bench % BW	Front Lever (s)	Grippul Lift (lb)	Grippul % BW	Vertical Jump (cm)	Weighted Pull-Up 2RM (lb)	Weighted 2RM % BW	1-Arm (lb)	1-Arm % BW
Gabe Krzykwa	175.35	175.8	225	1.28	8	174	0.99	71.2	140	0.85	12.5	0.07
Gunner Autterson	180.3	168	225	1.33	5	186.5	1.11	76.2	115	0.68	25	0.14

=== Women's Results ===
2021 BFL Combine Results

Name	Weight	Bench Press (Reps)	Flying Ladder (Reps)	Front Lever Rank	Front Lever (s)	Grippul Lift (STW%)	Weighted Pull-ups (Reps)	Compression (s)	Compression Rank	Overall Score
Emily Herdic	119.2	5	3	4	2.19	100	79	37.9	6	237.09
Natalia Grossman	104.4	1	2	6	2.8	93	79	52	7	242.8
Campbell Sarinopoulos	116	2	3	5	2.3	101	60	16.1	3	192.4
Maya Rudd	120	3	2	2	0.9	79	70	28.2	5	190.1
McKenzie Howard	149.6	11	2	7	2.9	66	53	6.3	1	149.2
Grace Ryan	144.6	5	2	3	1.12	76	51	7.63	2	147.75
Alexa Scherhrer	150	2	3	1	0	60	36	25.03	4	131.03

2022 BFL Combine Results

Name	Weight (lb)	Bench Max (lb)	Bench % BW	Flying Ladder (Reps)	Hollow Body (min:sec)	Grippul Lift (lb)	Grippul % BW	Vertical Jump (in)	Weighted Pull-Up (lb)	Weighted % BW	Compression (s)	1-Arm Pull-Up (Reps)
Scott Kerry	131.4	90	0.68	1	2:36	90	0.68	21	55	0.42	26.37	1
Campbell Sarinopoulos	110	90	0.81	2	2:36	110	1.00	22	65	0.59	42.92	1
Dolan Lydia	107.2	90	0.84	4	1:19	90	0.84	21	45	0.42	35.02	0
Adriene Akiko Clark	117.6	90	0.76	2	1:59	105	0.89	22	50	0.43	27.66	1
Stephanie Celommi	102	110	1.08	5	1:52	95	0.93	24	47.5	0.47	32.2	0

2023 BFL Combine Results

Name	Height	Weight (lb)	Bench Max	Bench % BW	Hollow Body	Grippul Lift (lb)	Grippul % BW	Vertical Jump (in)	Weighted Pull-Up 2RM (lb)	Weighted 2RM % BW	1 Arm (lb)	1 Arm % BW	Dragon Squat	Points
Stephanie Celommi	5'4"	124.8	110	0.881	1:19:00	80	0.641	25	45	0.36	15	0.121	3	3
Kestrel Pikiewicz	5'3"	119.8	80	0.667	1:27:00	95	0.794	22	50	0.42	25	0.210	3	3
Tiana Schwarz	5'2"	115.1	85	0.734	1:54:00	105	0.912	20	45	0.39	0	0.000	3	3
Zoe Steinberg	5'5"	130.85	113	0.864	2:00:00	110	0.841	24	65	0.497	15	0.114	3	3
Sonia Gutierrez	5'7"	125.45	85	0.678	1:59:00	95	0.758	23	57.5	0.458	30	0.239	3	3
Adriene Akiko Clark	5'6"	120	80	0.667	0:55:31	95	0.792	22	65	0.54	25	0.208	3	3

2024 BFL Combine Results

Name	Height (cm)	Weight (lb)	Bench Max (lb)	Bench % BW	Hollow Body (min)	Grippul Lift (lb)	Grippul % BW	Vertical Jump (cm)	Weighted Pull-Up 2RM (lb)	Weighted 2RM % BW	1-Arm Lock-off (lb)	1-Arm Lock-off % BW
Anika Shoemaker	162.56	140	140	1.00	—	130	0.93	55	85	0.61	30	0.21
Maddy Morris	165	135	115	0.85	—	115	0.85	47	80	0.59	30	0.22
Kestrel Pikiewicz	162.56	126	115	0.91	—	90	0.71	51	50	0.40	40	0.32
Kaitlyn Bone	157.48	125	115	0.92	—	135	1.08	61	80	0.64	40	0.32

2025 BFL Combine Results

Name	Height (cm)	Weight (lb)	Bench Max (lb)	Bench % BW	Hollow Body (min)	Grippul Lift (lb)	Grippul % BW	Vertical Jump (cm)	Weighted Pull-Up 2RM (lb)	Weighted 2RM % BW	1-Arm Lock-off (lb)	1-Arm Lock-off % BW
Amayah Burgos	172.72	150	110	0.73	1:34	120	0.80	62	40	0.26	35	0.23
Kestrel Pikiewicz	162.56	139.6	145	1.03	2:03	115	0.82	61	65	0.40	45	0.32
Marlowe LeMaire	167.64	102	85	0.83	1:16	85	0.83	55	35	0.34	35	0.34

== See also ==
- USA Climbing
- IFSC Climbing World Cup
- NFL Scouting Combine
