= Hiking boot =

Sturdy footwear for outdoor activities

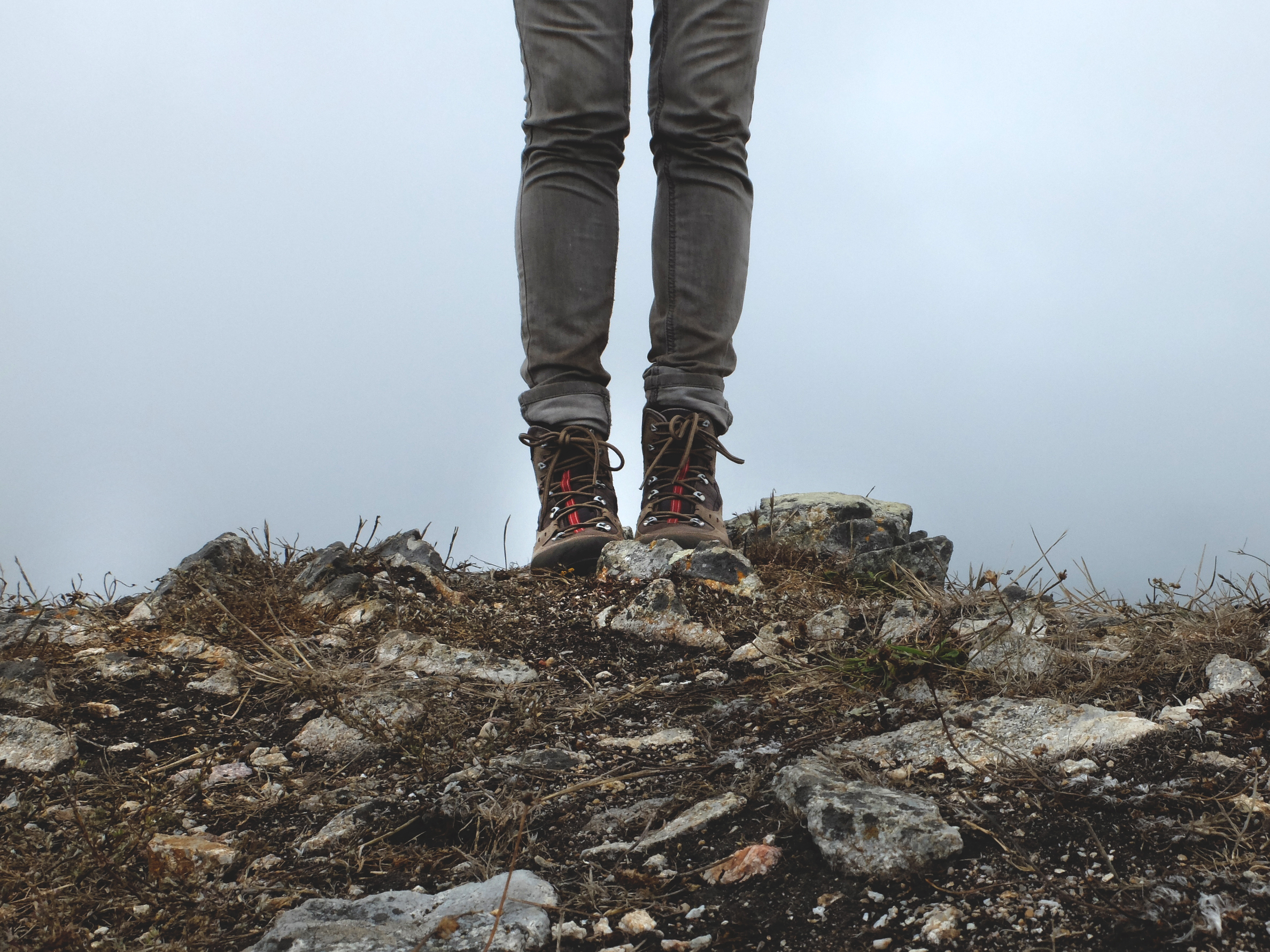
Hiking boots

Hiking (walking) boots are footwear specifically designed for protecting the feet and ankles during outdoor walking activities such as hiking. They are one of the most important items of hiking gear since their quality and durability can determine a hiker's ability to walk long distances without injury. Hiking boots are constructed to provide comfort for walking considerable distances over rough terrain. Boots that protect the hiker's feet and heel are recommended. Hiking boots give ankle support and are fairly stiff. A less popular alternative is to use light trainers with thin soles. Footwear should be neither too loose nor too tight, to help prevent blisters and sore feet. Hiking socks that wick sweat from the feet, provide warmth, and cushion the feet are recommended and a thin, inner sock may also help. Most hiking boots are also designed for other outdoor activities such as backpacking, climbing, mountaineering, and hunting.

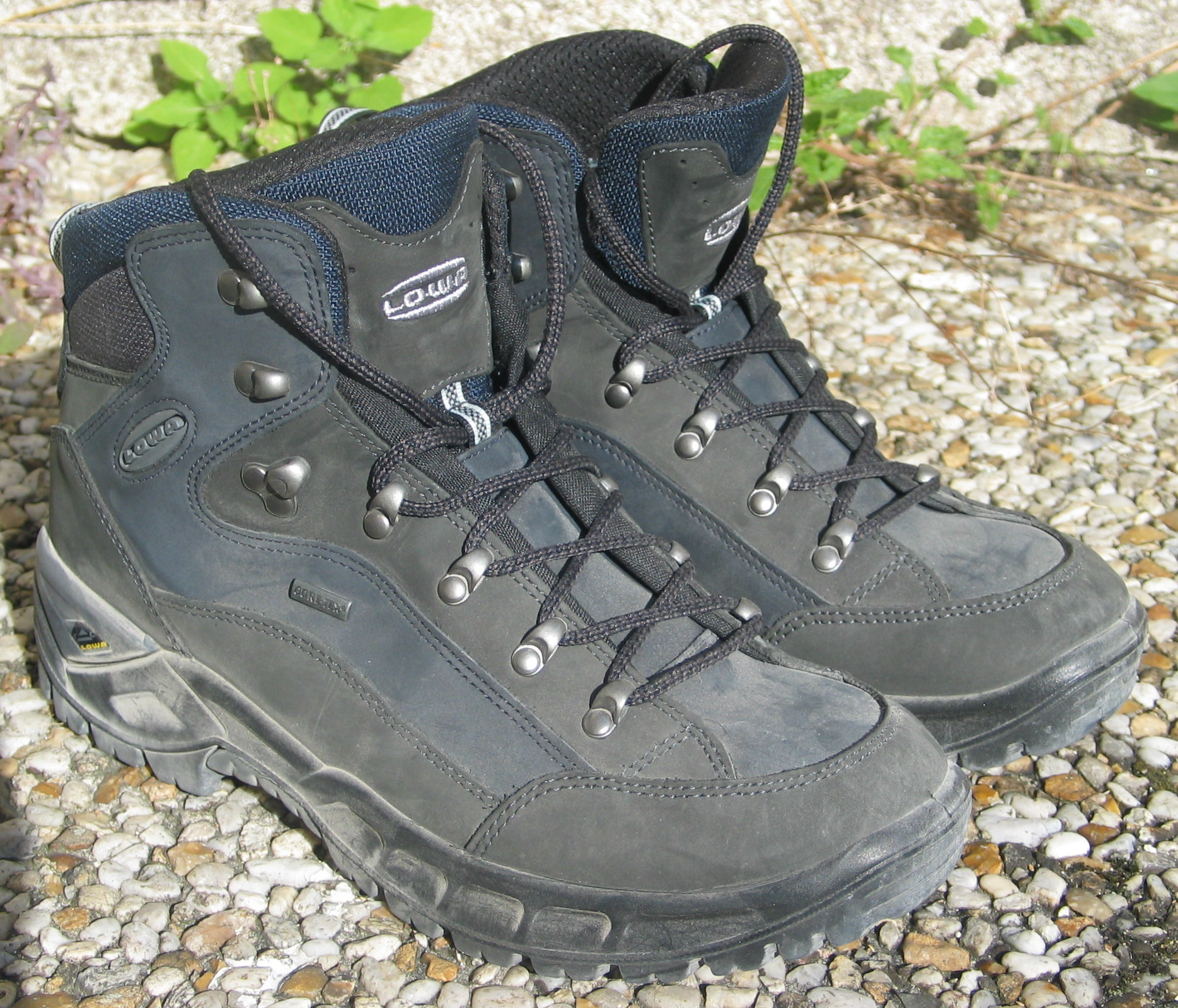
Typical early 21st-century hiking boots

== History ==
Before the 1970s and 80s, most hikers wore hunting, riding, military or everyday work boots while hiking. Some even wore gym shoes. Grandma Gatewood famously wore Keds sneakers during her first thru-hike of the Appalachian Trail in 1955. While so-called “mountain boots” were also available as early as the 1850s, they were mostly worn by climbers and adventurers from the upper classes who could afford their high price tags. One of the earliest uses of the term “hiking boots” appeared in the December 1914 issue of Mazama, the journal of The Mazamas mountaineering club. Use of this phrase in this instance, however, likely referred to “mountain boots”.

The first major improvement in mountaineering boots came about as a result of a deadly climbing accident in 1935. While descending Punta Rasica on the Swiss-Italian border, an expedition led by Vitale Bramani was caught in a severe snowstorm. Unable to descend along the icy rock walls, six of the climbers died from exhaustion, exposure and frostbite. As was the custom at that time, climbers wore heavy, hobnailed boots along the lower slopes of mountains. As they climbed higher they would exchange their boots for lighter rock climbing shoes, usually made with thin leather, felt-bottom soles that offered little protection against cold temperatures or moisture. Though they worked relatively well in normal weather conditions, the shoes offered virtually no grip in icy conditions. Convinced that inadequate footwear played a major role in the deaths of his six companions, Bramani was determined to find a solution to this problem. Two years later he introduced a sole with an innovative tread design that he called Carrarmato, an Italian word that means “tank tread.” The sole was made from vulcanized rubber and featured heavy lugs that were designed to take the place of hobnails. The rubber lug pattern provided boots with outstanding traction and allowed them to be used on a variety of surfaces, including uneven forest floors, bare rock, loose scree slopes and hard-packed snow. In 1937 Bramani launched his revolutionary new product. Taking the first two letters of his first name, and the first four letters of his last name, Vitale Bramani named his new company Vibram. Almost immediately the new lugged soles caught on with the climbing community, and eventually with hikers by the 1960s and 70s.

By the 1970s American bootmakers were beginning to turn their focus towards the production of lighter boots for day hikers and backpackers. One of the first boots to deliver on this promise was the Danner 6490, which weighed in at 3 pounds and 14 ounces. Since the introduction of that boot, manufacturers have made numerous advances over the years that have reduced the weight of hiking boots. This includes the use of lightweight leather or synthetic fabric uppers, replacing stitching with cement or injection molding to attach uppers to soles, and the use of shallower lugs.

The next major technological advance in boots came in 1980 when Danner and Donner Mountain Corporation introduced the first hiking boots made with Gore-Tex. Once the original high production costs were cut, the use of Gore-Tex in hiking boots became the industry standard. Nearly all hiking boots sold today are made with Gore-Tex or a similar waterproof-breathable fabric.

== Types ==
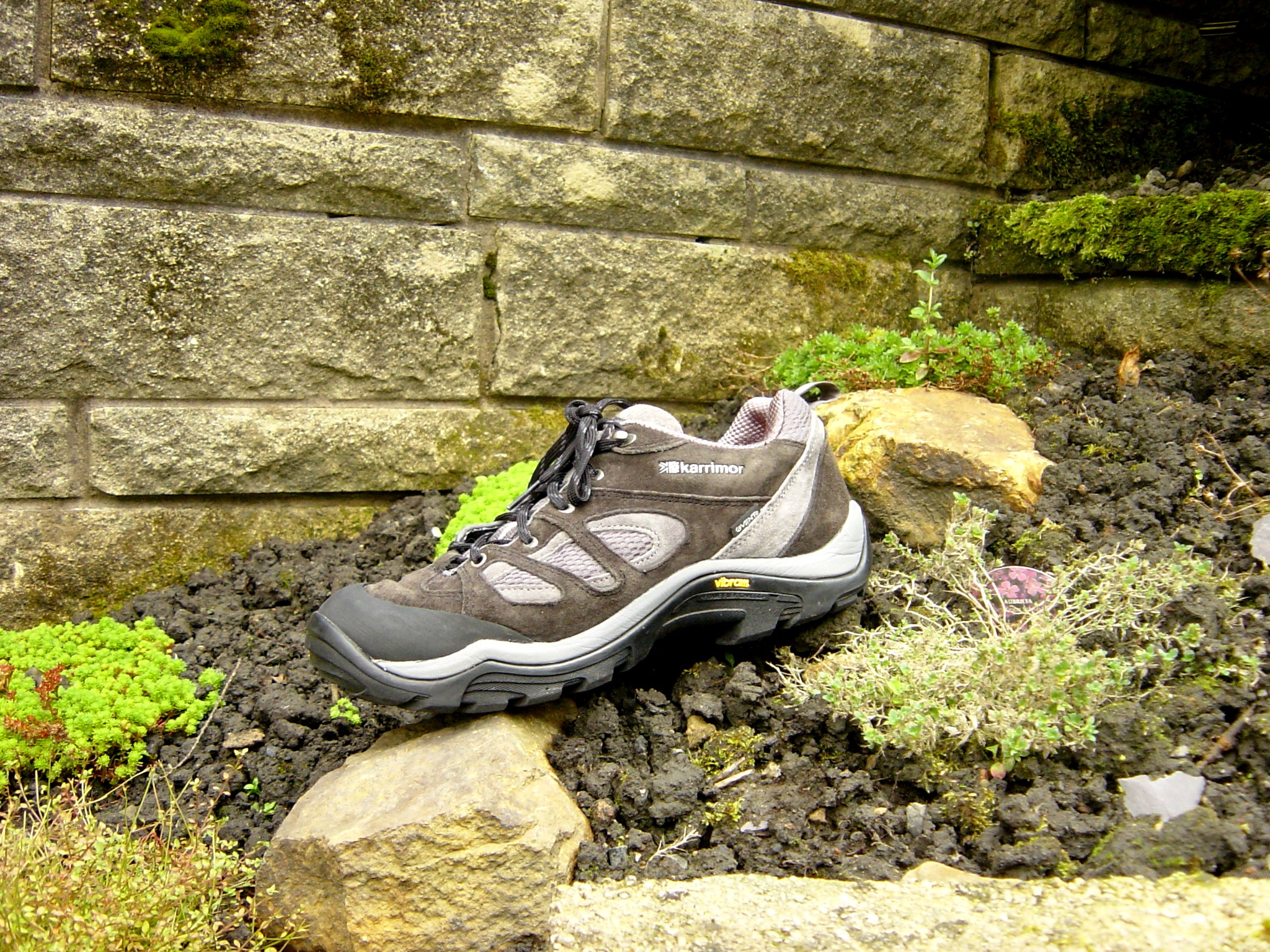
A Karrimor hiking trainer

There are three main types of walking footwear.

1. Trail shoes are made for hiking in dry climates, on well-established, less rugged or rocky paths. They are suitable for many types of day hikes.
2. Trail hikers are for steeper inclines and muddy paths. They are used where a lightweight boot is most suitable. Trail hikers are also sturdy, higher-cut, and watertight. These boots provide more stability and ankle protection against protruding limbs and rocks than hiking shoes do.
3. Mountain walking or hiking boots are designed for mountain and hill walking, backpacking and mountaineering. Crampons can be attached to them for a better grip on glaciers or hard-packed snow. They are extremely strong, and durable, and have stiff soles to give the ankles support and protection on difficult rocky trails. Mountaineering boots are usually taller and stiffer than hiking boots, providing insulation as well as support and protection.

== Parts ==
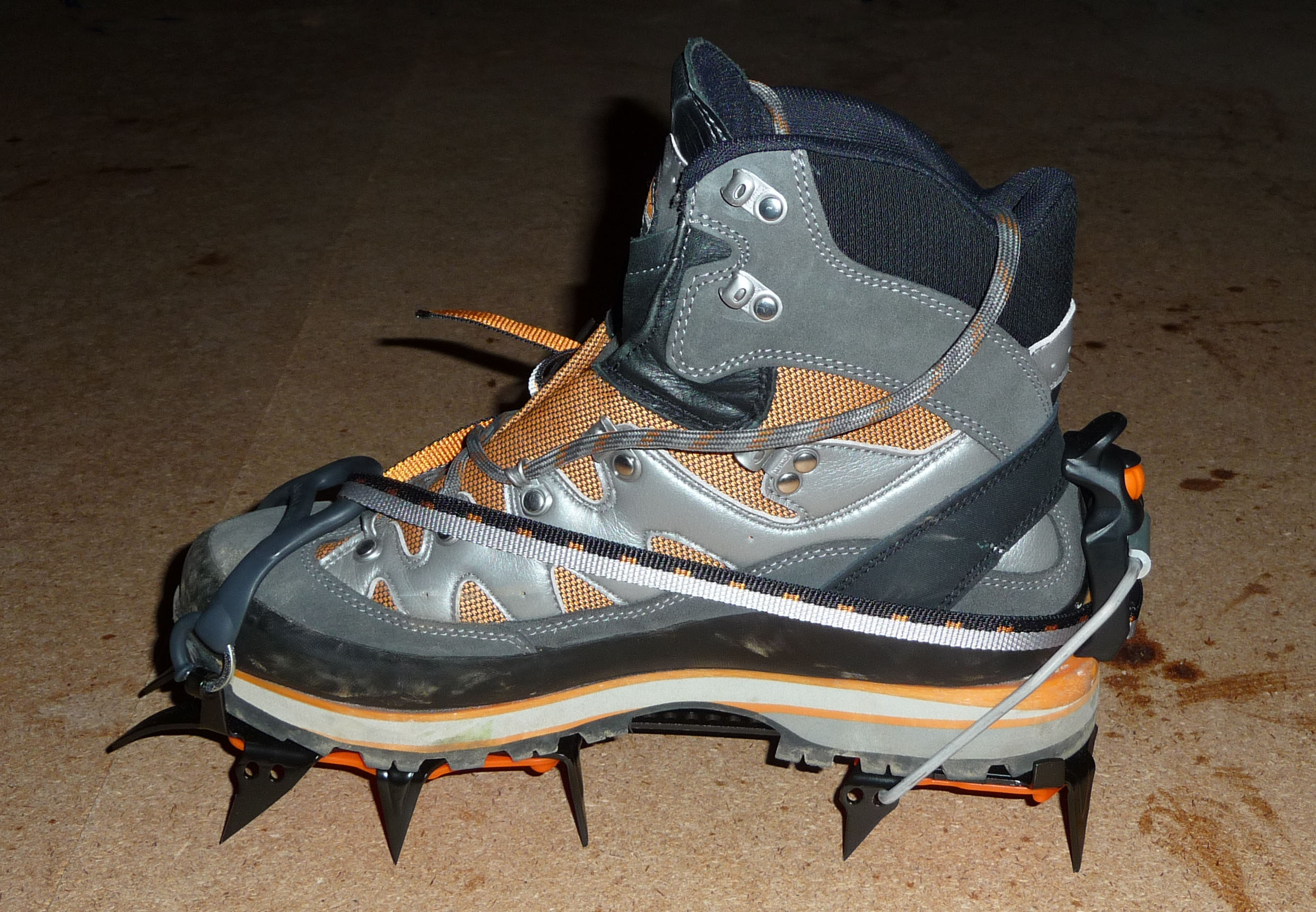
A Meindl boot with crampons attached

1. Upper: The upper part of a hiking boot is intended to protect and support the foot with an all-over snug fit. Uppers should be water repellent/proof, but allow the feet to breathe to prevent excess moisture from causing blisters and other discomfort.
2. Soles: Hiking boots have deep-lugged soles of tough rubber to provide friction and avoid slipping on any surfaces. Soles absorb and redirect shocks, and provide cushion for the feet.
3. Tongues: The flaps that cover the inlet of the upper are called tongues. This is the part that goes underneath the laces. Tongues make sure that water, dirt and debris will not enter the boots.
4. Linings and Paddings: Linings and paddings provide more protection and comfort for the feet.
5. Insoles / Footbeds: Insoles are the bottom part of the inner that the feet rest on. Insoles that are perfectly shaped to the hiker's feet will ensure maximum support and balance.
6. Shanks: The stiff plastic or metal plates built into the sole. Boots are made with full, three-quarter, or half-length shanks. Longer shanks make for stiffer boots.
7. Rand: Partial rand that protects high-wear areas or a full rand that encircles the boots above the midsole. Typically made of rubber or PU-coated leather.
8. Scree Collars: Protects the Achilles tendon and ankle from chafing.
9. Crampon Connections: Crampons are worn on boots to provide traction on snow and ice.

== See also ==
- List of boots
- List of shoe styles
- Backpacking
- Footwear
- Hill walking
- Mountaineering boots
- Trail running shoes
- Approach shoe
- Wellington boot
