= Adriene Akiko Clark =

American competition climber

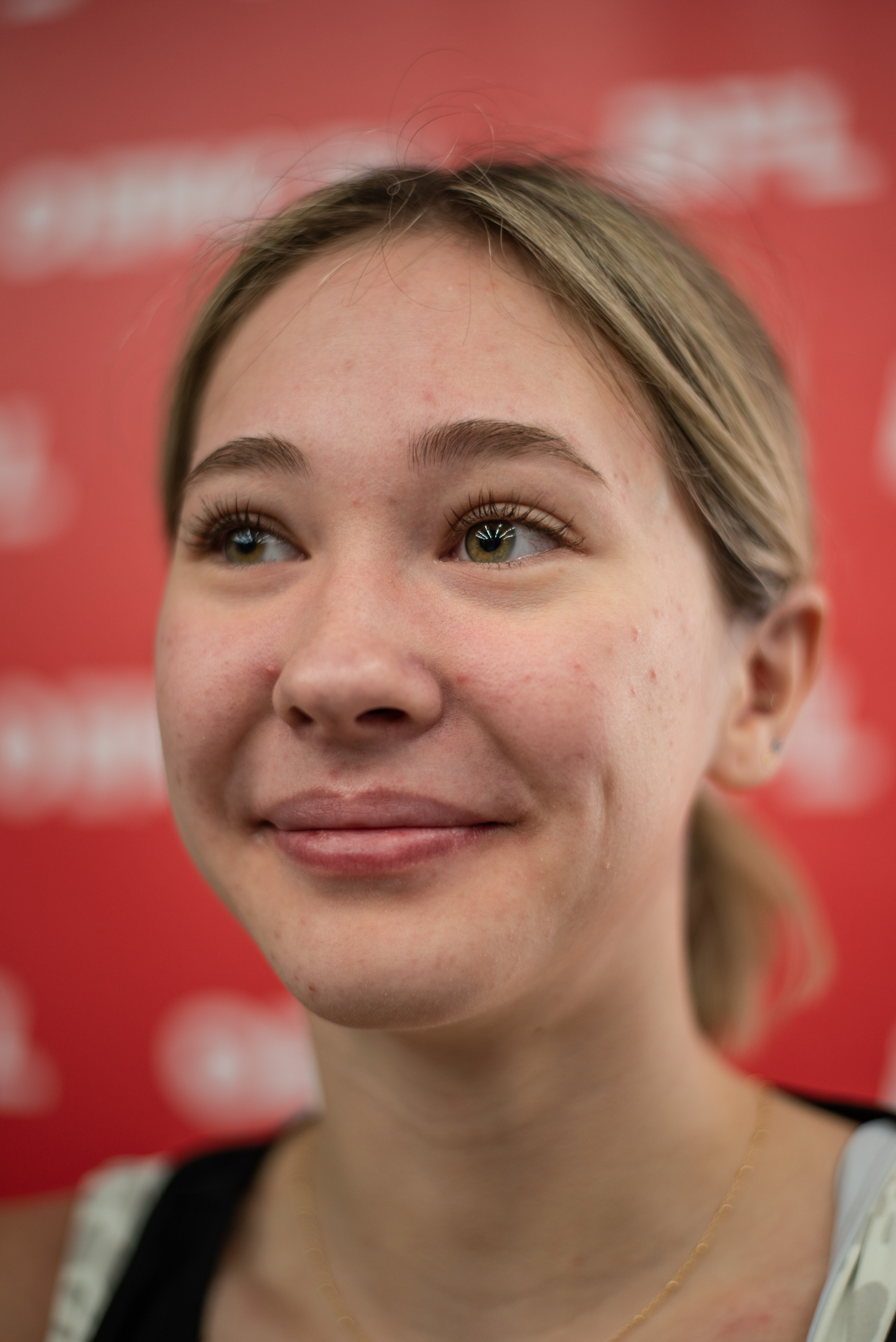
- Clark at 2023 BFL Climbing Combine in Colorado

Personal information
- Nationality: American
- Born: December 6, 2004 (age 21) St. Louis, Missouri, U.S.
- Occupation: Rock climber
- Height: 168 cm (5 ft 6 in)
- Website: adrieneakiko.com

Sport
- Sport: Competition climbing
- Events: Bouldering, Sport climbing
- Club: USA Climbing
- Turned pro: May 8, 2022 (age 17)
Medal record
Women's competition climbing
Representing the United States
Event	1st	2nd	3rd
2024 IFSC Climbing Pan American Championships	1	0	0

Adriene Akiko Clark (Akiko (Japanese: 明子); /ˈædriːənˈɑːkiːkoʊklɑːrk/ AD-ree-ən-AH-kee-koh-KLARK); born December 6, 2004) is an American professional rock climber who competes in competition climbing, including the IFSC Climbing World Cup and national-level events. Representing the United States, Clark specializes in bouldering and lead climbing, and is a member of the 2025 USA Climbing National Team.

Clark earned her first international medal by winning gold in bouldering at the 2024 IFSC Pan American Championships, securing her spot on the 2025 USA National Team.

== Early life ==
Clark was born and raised in St. Louis, Missouri. Initially trying ballet and gymnastics, Clark was introduced to rock climbing at age four during a visit to REI. She began climbing at the age of 7 at Upper Limits Climbing Gym and soon joined Team Upper Limits. She competed in her first climbing competition on November 10, 2012, and attended her first USA Climbing Nationals in January 2013 at age 8. She was sponsored by Five Ten Footwear from a young age.

In 2008, Clark's family moved to Centennial, Colorado. She joined Team ABC in Boulder, Colorado in 2021, training under four-time World Champion Robyn Erbesfield-Raboutou. Ahead of the 2024 USA Climbing National Championships, Clark also trained with coach Ryan Arment and worked alongside World Cup medalist and nine-time USA Climbing National Champion, Alex Puccio.

== Competition climbing career ==
Clark qualified for multiple international events during her youth career but declined to participate in the Youth World Championships. Her international debut came at the 2022 IFSC World Cup in Seoul, South Korea, on May 8, 2022, where she placed 39th in Women's Boulder. The event was won by American teammate Natalia Grossman.

In 2024, Clark became involved in a scoring controversy during the USA Climbing National Team Trials. In the final round, Clark was leading, with a would-be score of 38+, ahead of fellow finalists Olivia Ma and Annie Sanders. However, all finalists' scores were paused at 36 after officials controversially ruled that it was impossible to reach and clip the protection point beyond hold 36 in accordance with Rule 7.11.2 (b)(iv). All finalists disagreed with the call, and Sanders handed Clark her gold medal.

At the 2025 USA Climbing National Team Trials, Clark won the Women's Lead category. Her combined result secured her a position on the 2025 U.S. Lead National Team.

Before her pro debut, Clark participated in the 2022 and 2023 BFL Climbing Combine.

Pre-pro measurables
Height	Weight (lb)	Bench Press Max	Bench Press % BW	Hollow Body	Grippul Lift (lb)	Grippul % BW	Vertical Jump (in)	Weighted Pull-Up (lb)	Weighted Pull-Up % BW	1 Arm Lockoff (lb)	1 Arm Lockoff % BW
5′6″ (1.68 m)	120 (54 kg)	80 (36 kg)	0.667	0:55:31	95 (43 kg)	0.792	22 (0.55 m)	65 (29 kg))	0.540	25 (11 kg)	0.208
All values from 2023 BFL Climbing Combine.

=== National Titles ===
- 2026 Lead 3rd Place – Portland Rock Gym, Beaverton (3rd place)
- 2025 Lead Champion – Mesa Rim Climbing Center, Austin (1st place)
- 2025 Boulder 2nd Place – Mesa Rim Climbing Center, Austin (2nd place)
- 2024 Lead 3rd Place – Sportrock, Rio (3rd place)
- 2023 Lead 2nd Place – YETI Nationals, Vertical View (2nd place)
- 2022 Boulder Champion – Stone Summit, Atlanta (1st place)

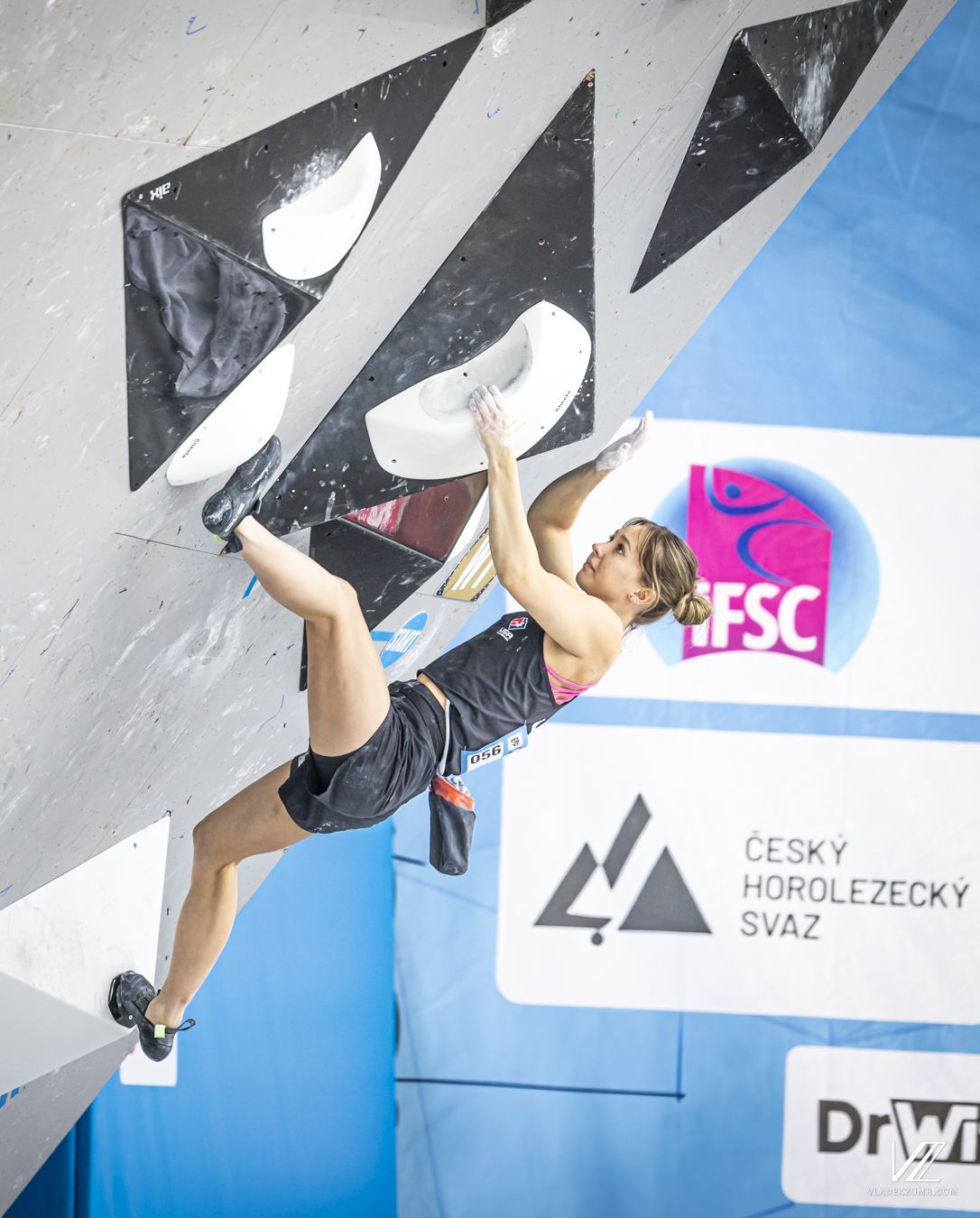
Clark competing at the 2025 Boulder World Cup in Prague.

=== International Career ===
==== 2022 World Cup Season ====
Clark made her senior debut at the 2022 IFSC World Cup in Seoul, where she placed 39th in Women's Boulder. The event was won by Natalia Grossman, who led a strong U.S. performance at the competition.

In June 2022, Clark competed at the IFSC Boulder World Cup in Brixen, Italy, where she placed 31st in the women's qualification round.

Later in May 2022, she participated in the 2022 IFSC Climbing World Cup in Salt Lake City, Utah, where she placed 17th in the first bouldering event and 31st in the second.

==== 2023 World Cup Season ====
Clark competed in the 2023 IFSC World Cup Boulder World Cup in Prague, finishing 19th among a field of international athletes. The event was won by France's Oriane Bertone, with Clark as the only U.S. athlete in the top 20.

==== 2024 World Cup Season ====
Clark won her first international gold medal in 2024, taking first place in Women's Boulder at the IFSC Pan American Championships in Santiago, Chile, ahead of Argentina's Valentina Aguado and Canada's Jacqueline Ho. The result qualified her for the 2025 IFSC World Cup circuit and the U.S. National Team.

In 2024, Clark was among several Team USA climbers who were unable to compete at the IFSC World Cup in Briançon, France, due to a clerical error by USA Climbing. The governing body failed to confirm their participation, resulting in disqualification from the event.

==== 2025 World Cup Season ====
Clark was selected as one of five American lead climbers on the U.S. team for the 2025 IFSC World Cup season, including the Bali stop, alongside fellow athletes like Zoe Yi and Colin Duffy. Clark opened her 2025 season at the IFSC Boulder World Cup in Keqiao, China, where she placed 24th in the qualification round. She then competed in the Lead World Cup in Wujiang, China, placing 29th.

In May, Clark finished 26th in the Lead World Cup in Bali, Indonesia.

She concluded the first half of her season with a 29th-place finish in the Boulder World Cup in Salt Lake City, Utah.

At the 2025 IFSC Boulder World Cup in Prague, Clark finished 21st in the qualification rounds, making the cut for semi-finals. She placed alongside notable climbers such as Japan's Mao Nakamura and Israel's Ayala Kerem in a close four-way tie for the final 21st spot.

In September 2025, Clark competed at her first IFSC Climbing World Championships in Seoul, placing 44th in the women's lead qualification round.

==== 2026 World Cup Season ====
Clark qualified for both Boulder and Lead National teams, placing third in Lead Women's finals, selected as one of five American climbers on the U.S. team for the 2026 World Climbing Series season, alongside fellow athletes Brooke Raboutou, Melina Costanza, and Nekaia Sanders.

== National and International Results ==
=== National Results ===
==== National Championships and Team Trials ====
Year	Event	Discipline	Rank	Location
2026	USAC National Team Trials	Lead	3rd	Portland Rock Gym, Beaverton
2026	USAC National Team Trials	Boulder	8th	Portland Rock Gym, Beaverton
2025	USAC National Team Trials	Lead	1st	Mesa Rim Climbing Center, Austin
2025	USAC National Team Trials	Boulder	2nd	Mesa Rim Climbing Center, Austin
2024	USAC National Team Trials	Lead	3rd	Sportrock, Virginia
2024	USAC National Team Trials	Boulder	4th	Sportrock, Virginia
2023	USAC National Team Trials	Lead	2nd	Vertical View, Idaho
2023	USAC National Team Trials	Boulder	4th	Mesa Rim Climbing Center, Texas
2022	USAC National Team Trials	Boulder	6th	Stone Summit, Georgia
2021	YETI National Championships	Boulder	5th	Salt Lake City, Utah

Results sourced from USA Climbing Results.

=== International Results ===
==== IFSC Podiums ====
Discipline	2022	2023	2024	2025	2026
Bouldering	–	–	1	–	–
Lead	–	–	–	–	–

==== IFSC World Cup and Continental Rankings ====
Representing the United States
Event	City	Date	Discipline	Rank
2026 World Climbing Series	Prague	2026-06-07	Boulder	31
2026 World Climbing Series	Alcobendas	2026-05-31	Boulder	29
2026 World Climbing Series	Wujiang	2026-05-10	Lead	25
2026 World Climbing Series	Keqiao	2026-05-03	Boulder	21
2025 IFSC World Cup	Korea	2025-07-19	Boulder	43
2025 IFSC World Cup	Korea	2025-00-28	Lead	48
2025 IFSC World Cup	Spain	2025-07-19	Lead	50
2025 IFSC World Cup	Chamonix	2025-07-13	Lead	32
2025 IFSC World Cup	Innsbruck	2025-06-29	Lead	15
2025 IFSC World Cup	Innsbruck	2025-06-29	Boulder	20
2025 IFSC World Cup	Bern	2025-06-15	Boulder	37
2025 IFSC World Cup	Prague	2025-06-08	Boulder	22
2025 IFSC World Cup	Salt Lake City, USA	2025-05-26	Boulder	29
2025 IFSC World Cup	Bali, India	2025-05-04	Lead	26
2025 IFSC World Cup	Wujiang	2025-04-27	Lead	29
2025 IFSC World Cup	Keqiao	2025-04-20	Boulder	24
2024 IFSC Pan American Championships	Santiago	2024-11-25	Boulder	1
2024 IFSC Pan American Championships	Santiago	2024-11-25	Lead	13
2024 IFSC World Cup	Koper	2024-09-07	Lead	38
2024 IFSC World Cup	Chamonix	2024-07-14	Lead	31
2024 IFSC World Cup	Salt Lake City	2024-05-06	Boulder	23
2024 IFSC World Cup	Wujiang	2024-04-14	Lead	21
2023 IFSC World Cup	Briançon	2023-07-15	Lead	29
2023 IFSC World Cup	Chamonix	2023-07-09	Lead	59
2023 IFSC World Cup	Villars-sur-Ollon	2023-07-02	Lead	63
2023 IFSC World Cup	Prague	2023-06-04	Boulder	19
2023 IFSC World Cup	Salt Lake City	2023-05-22	Boulder	39
2022 IFSC World Cup (B)	Brixen, Italy	2022-06-12	Boulder	31
2022 IFSC World Cup (B,S)	Salt Lake City	2022-05-30	Boulder	31
2022 IFSC World Cup (B,S)	Salt Lake City	2022-05-23	Boulder	17
2022 IFSC World Cup (B,S)	Seoul	2022-05-08	Boulder	39

Sourced from the International Federation of Sport Climbing
