= Charles Cole (climber) =

American rock climber and inventor

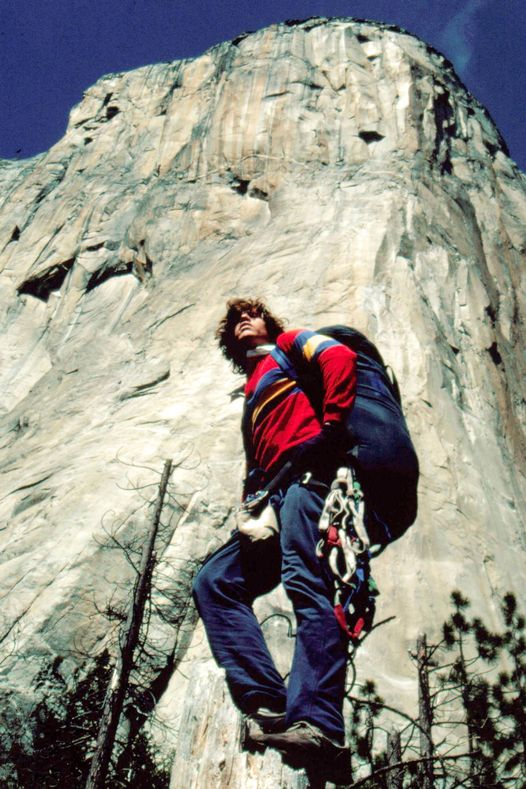
- Cole in Yosemite, c. 1980s
- Born: Charles David Cole III; April 29, 1955; Mineola, New York, U.S.
- Died: July 14, 2018 (aged 63); Redlands, California, U.S.
- Education: University of Southern California (BS); University of Michigan (MBA)
- Occupations: Inventor, Entrepreneur, Climber
- Known for: Founder of Five Ten, inventor of Stealth rubber
- Spouse: Paola Cole
- Children: 3

Charles David "Charlie" Cole III (April 29, 1955 – July 14, 2018) was an American rock climber, inventor, and entrepreneur. He was the founder of the climbing shoe company Five Ten, established in 1985, and is best known for inventing the ultra-sticky Stealth Rubber outsole that revolutionized rock climbing and mountain sports footwear. An accomplished climber himself, Cole achieved several notable first ascents in Yosemite and Joshua Tree and earned a reputation as a pioneering innovator in climbing gear. His developments in high-friction rubber technology "changed the way we all climb."

== Early life and education ==
Cole was born in Mineola, New York, on April 29, 1955. In 1968, his family moved to Pasadena, California, where he attended the Polytechnic School. He later studied at St. Paul's School in New Hampshire, and went on to earn a B.S. in mechanical engineering from the University of Southern California in 1978, followed by an MBA from the University of Michigan in 1981.

Cole began climbing during his university years, inspired by the film The Eiger Sanction. He pursued climbing full-time after briefly working as an engineer, living out of Camp 4 in Yosemite and developing a reputation for bold ascents.

== Climbing career ==
In the late 1970s and early 1980s, Cole completed difficult first ascents in Yosemite, including Jolly Roger (VI 5.10 A5, with Steve Grossman), and solo ascents of Queen of Spades (VI 5.9 A4+) and Space (VI 5.10 A4+) on El Capitan. He also put up notable free climbs in Joshua Tree, including the classic Run For Your Life (5.10b).

== Founding of Five Ten ==
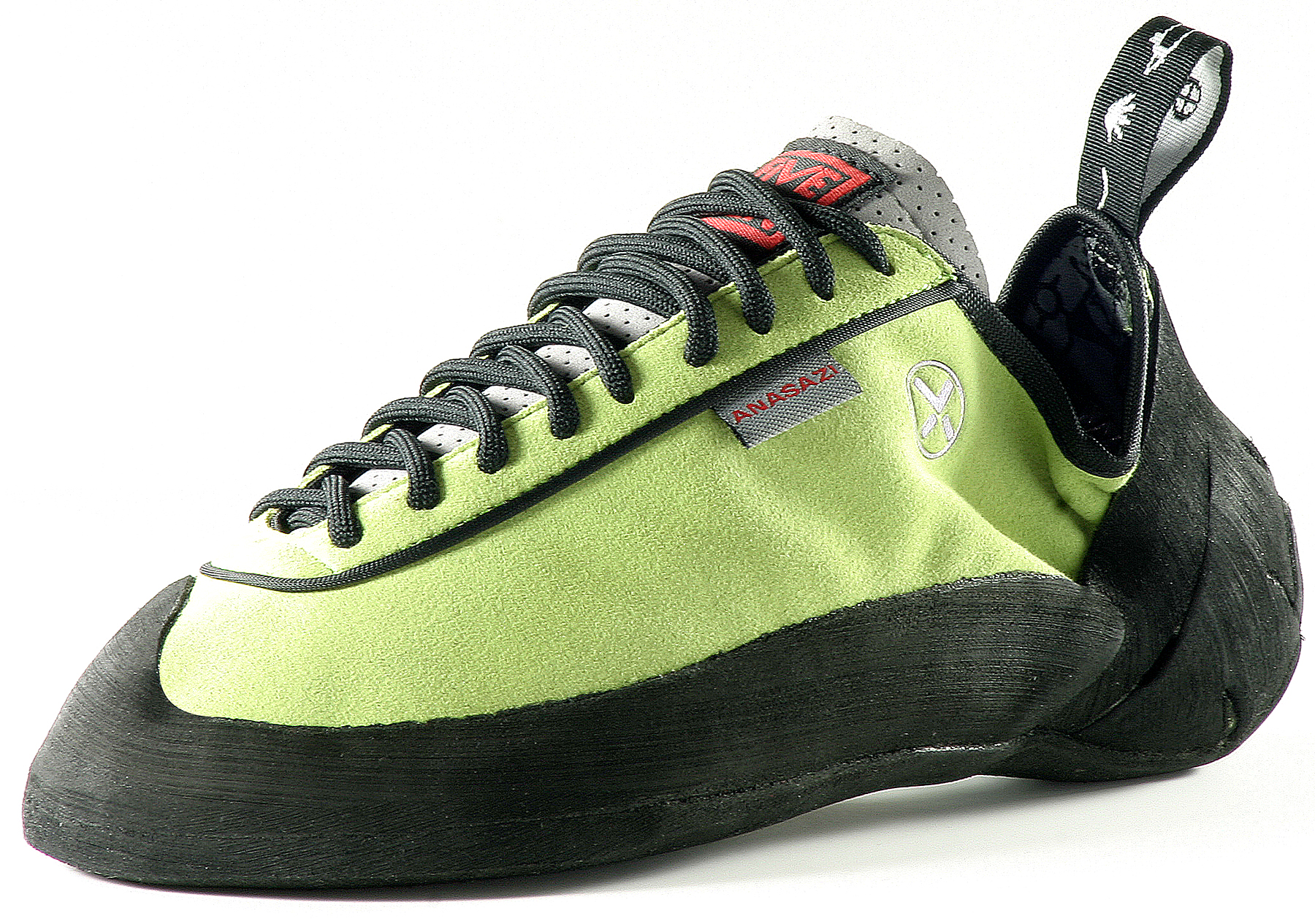
Original Five Ten Anasazi Verde

In 1985, Cole founded Five Ten in Redlands, California. The company name referenced the 5.10 grade in the Yosemite Decimal System. Cole created the brand’s first approach shoe, the Five Tennie, in response to slippery Yosemite descents.

He later partnered with chemists to develop Stealth Rubber, a high-friction compound introduced in 1986. It became a cornerstone of Five Ten’s success, offering superior grip for climbing, mountain biking, and military footwear.

== Innovation and legacy ==
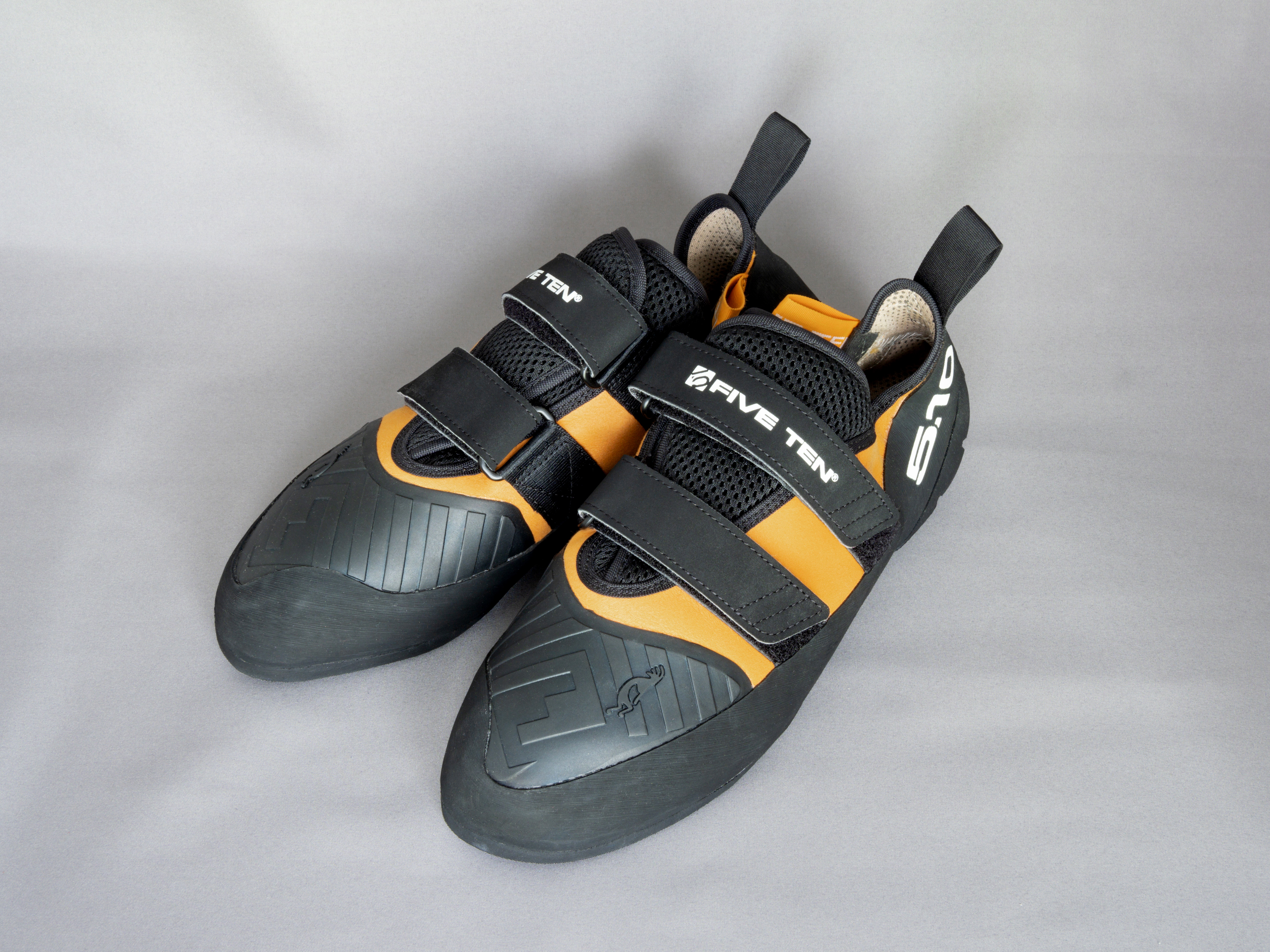
Five Ten Anasazi Pro climbing shoe in orange

Cole introduced several industry firsts, including the first climbing shoes with Velcro straps, women's-specific designs, and downturned sport shoes. His innovations extended to mountain biking, with the launch of the Impact shoe for flat pedals.

In 2011, Adidas acquired Five Ten for $25 million. Cole continued working in R&D for a few years. When Adidas moved operations to Germany in 2017, former Five Ten staff founded Unparallel Sports in California to preserve Cole’s vision.

== Inventions and Patents ==
Cole was credited with a wide range of innovations that transformed outdoor sports footwear, particularly in rock climbing and mountain biking. Over his career, he was granted more than ten U.S. patents, many of which focused on rubber compounds, shoe structure, and performance design. His innovations helped set industry standards in the 1980s and 1990s and remain foundational in modern climbing gear.

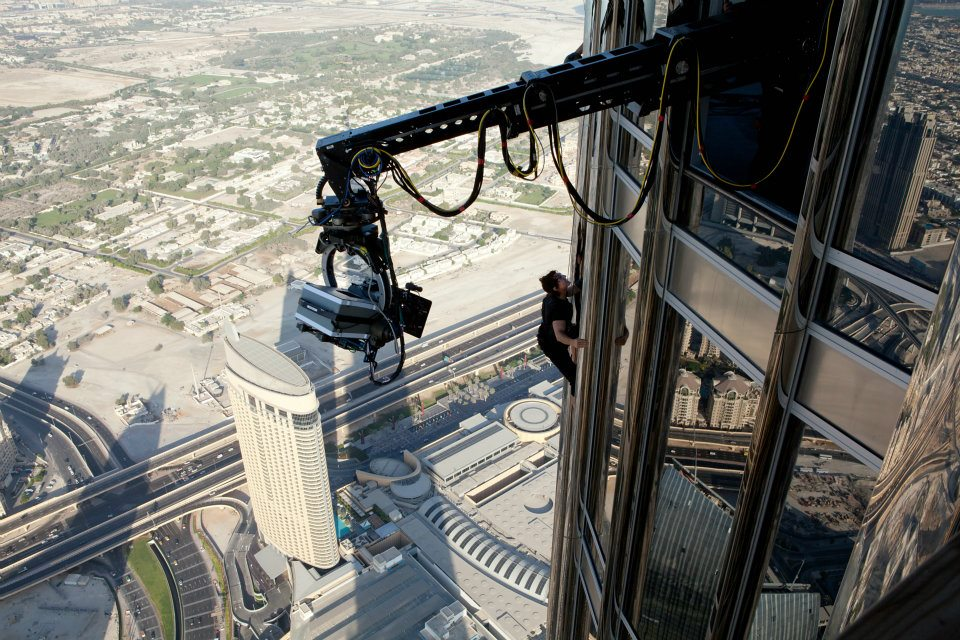
Behind the scenes of Mission: Impossible – Ghost Protocol, where actor Tom Cruise wore custom footwear featuring Five Ten’s Stealth MI6 rubber for the Burj Khalifa climbing scene.

Stealth MI6 Rubber (2011) – A softer rubber compound developed for impact absorption and stealth movement, initially designed for Tom Cruise's climb on the Burj Khalifa in "Mission: Impossible – Ghost Protocol."

Stealth Rubber (1986) – A high-friction rubber compound offering exceptional grip on rock surfaces. Initially developed for climbing shoes, it was later adapted for mountain biking, military, and water sports applications.

- Patent: "US Patent WO1991001659A1 – Climbing shoe". USPTO.

Climbing Shoe Construction with Downturned Toes – Cole was the first to produce a commercially available climbing shoe with an aggressive down-camber, aiding performance on overhanging sport climbs.

- Patent: US 7,373,738 B2 – Faceted outsole shoe structure Granted May 20, 2008; filed July 23, 2002. Describes a shoe outsole with multiple faceted portions for improved traction and terrain adaptability—used in Five Ten’s later climbing and biking shoes.

Velcro Strap Closure for Climbing Shoes – He introduced the first climbing shoes to use Velcro hook-and-loop closures instead of laces, improving on-the-go adjustability and ease of removal.

Five Tennie (1985) – The first modern approach shoe, blending the grip of a climbing shoe with the comfort of a hiking sneaker.

- Impact Mountain Biking Shoe (2000) – The first purpose-built flat-pedal mountain bike shoe, incorporating Stealth Rubber to provide unparalleled grip on platform pedals.

Micro-Cellular Rubber Outsole – Cole helped develop a lightweight outsole using micro-cellular sponge rubber, designed to maintain high grip while reducing shoe weight. This innovation advanced Five Ten’s performance in mountain biking and impact-prone disciplines.

- Patent: US 7,398,808 B2 – Micro-cellular sponge rubber outsole Granted July 15, 2008; filed August 21, 2002. Describes an outsole constructed from a micro-cellular rubber compound designed to reduce weight while maintaining durability and high surface grip—used in advanced Stealth Rubber models for mountain biking and climbing shoes.

=== Miscellaneous Innovations ===
- Rubber-soled canyoneering water shoe (Five Tennie Water)
- Women-specific climbing shoe design
- Low-profile climbing slippers with elastic pull-tabs

Note: While not all of his innovations were formally patented, Cole’s engineering approach and obsessive attention to friction-based performance left a permanent mark on climbing shoe design. His work continues to inspire climbing and outdoor gear companies worldwide.

== Death ==
Cole died on July 14, 2018, at his home in Redlands. He was 63 and survived by his wife, Paola, and three children.
