= Charles Coles (disambiguation) =

Charles Coles was an American actor and tap dancer.

Charles Coles may also refer to:

- Charles Coles (footballer) (1879–1942), Australian rules footballer for Geelong Football Club
- Chuck Coles (born 1981), musician
- Chuck Coles (baseball) (1931–1996), Major League Baseball left fielder
- Charlie Coles (1942–2013), basketball coach

== See also ==
- Charles Cole (disambiguation)
