= Mountaineering boot =

Footwear for mountain climbing

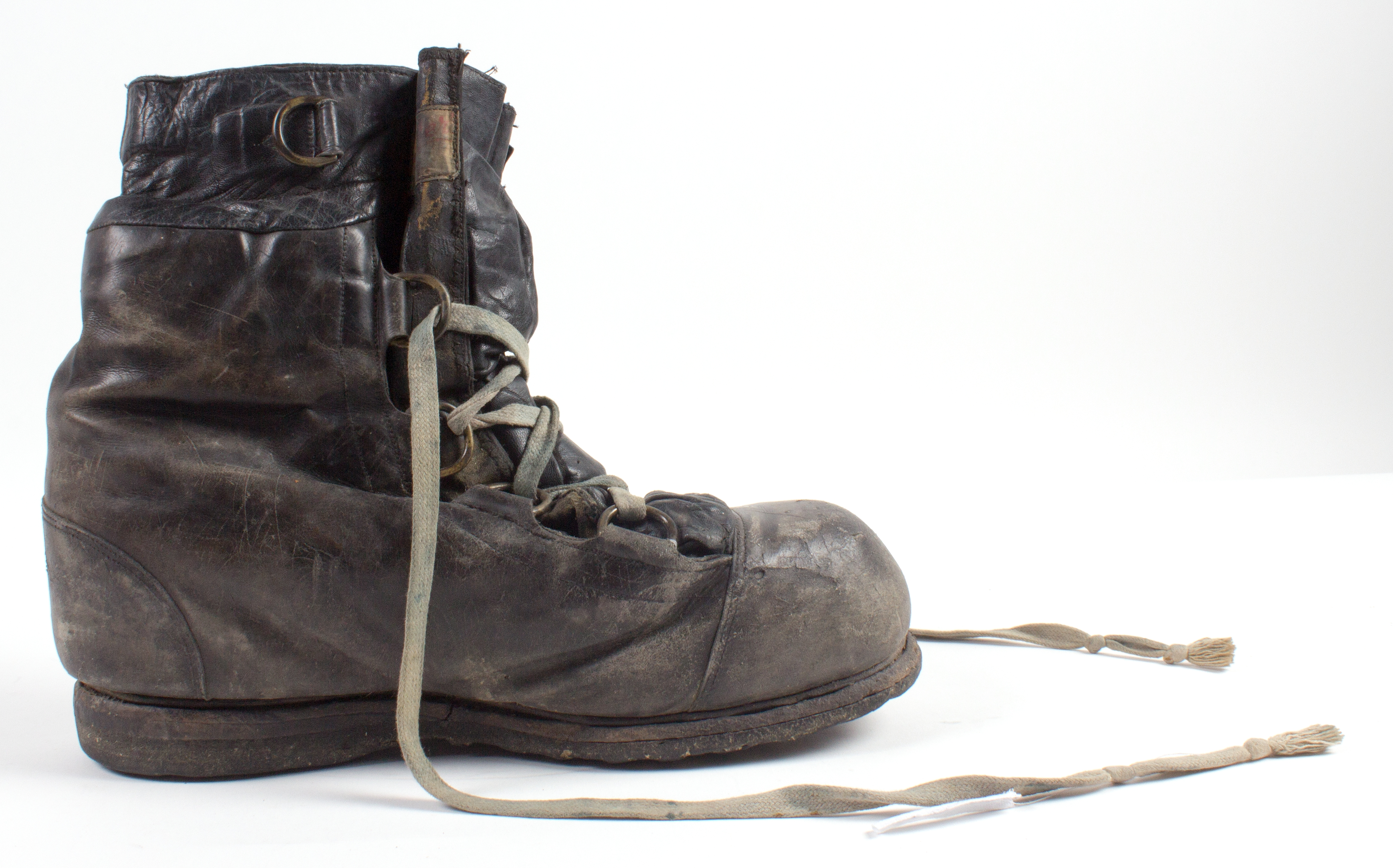
Mountaineering boots from 1961. They are a copy of the model that Edmund Hillary used on Mount Everest in 1953

Mountaineering, expedition or high altitude boots are a type of footwear used in mountain climbing. They are designed specifically for moving over harsh terrain.

== Design ==
Not to be confused with hiking boots, mountaineering boots are usually taller, stiffer, and insulated. The boots can be made of leather, plastic, or modern synthetic materials like Kevlar.

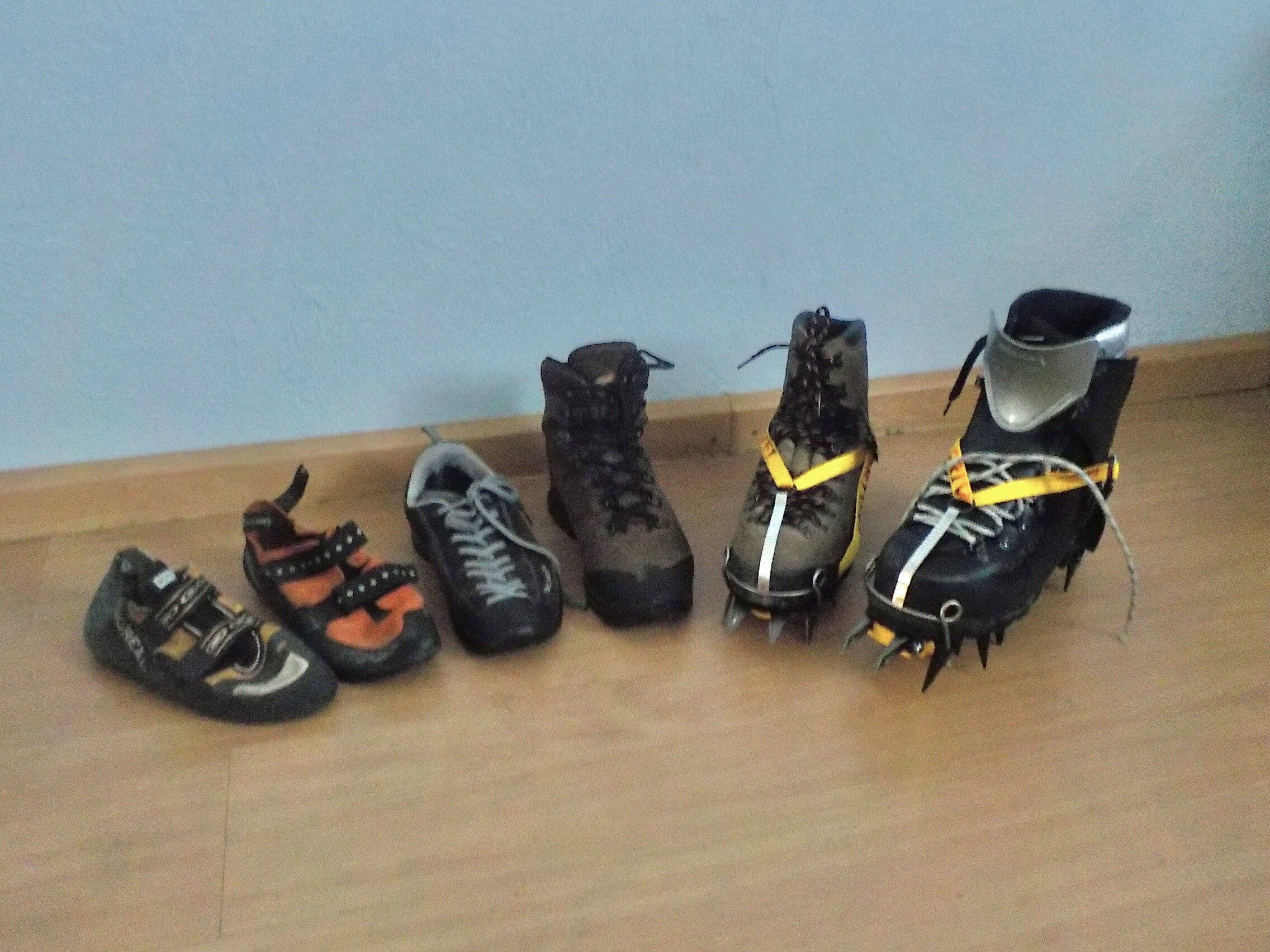
From left to right: two rock climbing shoes, approach shoe, hiking boot, a leather mountaineering boot and a plastic mountaineering boot. The mountaineering boots are fitted with automatic crampons

The extra height and stiffness of mountaineering boots helps support the climber in steep terrain where flexible boots could cause unsure footing and possibly result in a fall. This extra stiffness is traditionally achieved through the use of a full steel shank, though some manufacturers have begun to use carbon fiber to create the necessary stiffness.

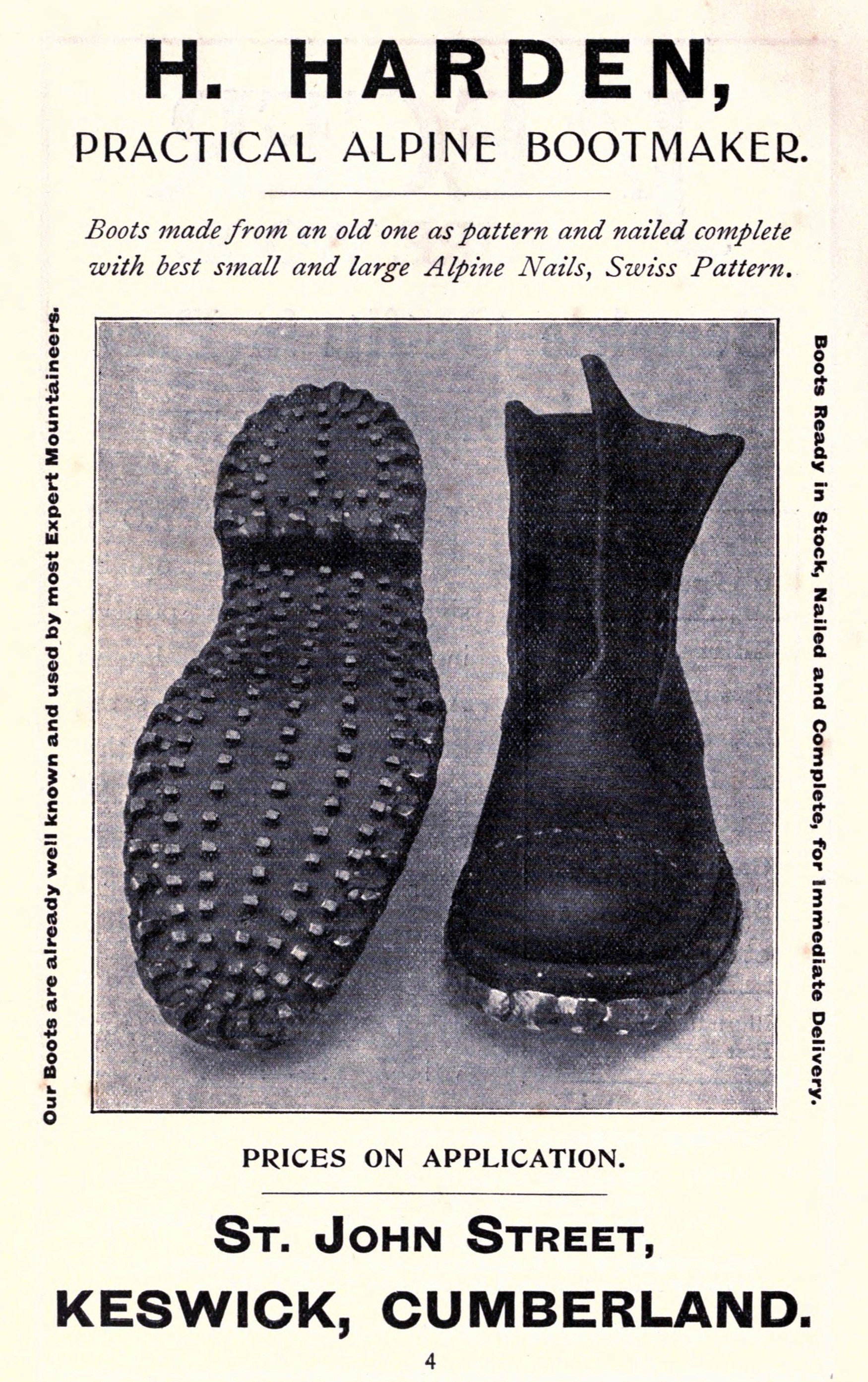
Mountaineering boots from 1911

Mountaineering boots are typically designed to be used with crampons. To achieve compatibility with crampons, welts are moulded into the toe and heel of the boot, providing a platform for the crampon to attach to. The stiffness of the boot enhances the precision of the crampon and allows a climber to pursue steeper and more difficult terrain.

Another important aspect of mountaineering boots is warmth. To prevent frostbite in extreme cold conditions, synthetic insulation is incorporated into the boot. Lighter weight boots are classified as single boots. These single boots are insulated as a single unit with the insulation being permanently attached to the rest of the boot. Double boots, another classification, typically consist of a non-insulated leather or plastic outer shell with a removable insulated liner. The purpose of a double boot is long-term protection from cold weather. If the liner becomes wet, it can be removed from the shell and dried inside a sleeping bag. Since the insulation cannot be removed from single boots, they are not ideally suited for multi-day cold weather excursions.

== Other uses ==
Mountaineering boots are used for ice climbing, mixed (rock and ice) climbing, and crevasse traverse and rescue. They are not completely stiff like ski boots as they need some degree of flexibility for activities such as hiking and snowshoeing.

The versatility of these boots also makes them popular for other activities. With their durability and extreme-weather adaptability, they are worn by snow-plough drivers, cable car operators, mountain rangers (especially in the winter), rescue paramedics, ski lift operators and snowcat drivers.

Mountaineering boots are generally considered to be too stiff for backpacking on established trails.

In recent years, companies have been making mountaineering boots to be NFPA compliant so they may be used in wildland firefighting.

== See also ==
- List of boots
- List of shoe styles
- Approach shoe
