= Charlie Cole =

Charlie Cole may refer to:

- Charlie Cole (lawyer) (born 1927), American lawyer, attorney general of Alaska 1990–1994
- Charlie Cole (photographer) (1955–2019), American photographer who took the picture of the Tank Man during the 1989 Tiananmen Square protests
- Charlie Cole (rower) (born 1986), American rower who competed in the 2012 Olympics

== See also ==
- Charles Cole (disambiguation)
