= Shank (footwear) =

Element of a shoe

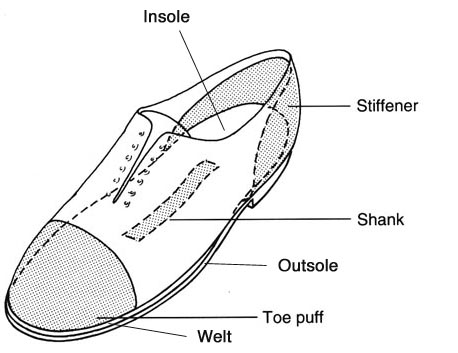
Schematic of some common components of a dress shoe including the insole, stiffener, shank, outsole, toe puff, and welt.

In a boot or shoe, the shank is a long, thin piece of material between the insole and outsole intended to support the foot and provide structure.

== Background ==
Materials and design for shanks vary widely with the purpose of the footwear. The shank of a pointe shoe used for ballet is made of flexible materials like leather, plastic, or cardstock, and may have customized length, thickness, and stiffness. Heavy boots such as those used for construction or hiking have far more rigid and durable shanks, often using steel, though contemporary shanks are more commonly made of less heat-conductive materials such as fiberglass and Kevlar. These materials' rigid nature adds a protective element, helping shield feet from puncture wounds and stone bruises. The shank is crucial to the functionality of mountaineering boots, as they diminish the load incurred by the feet and calves over the course of an ascent.

== Gallery ==
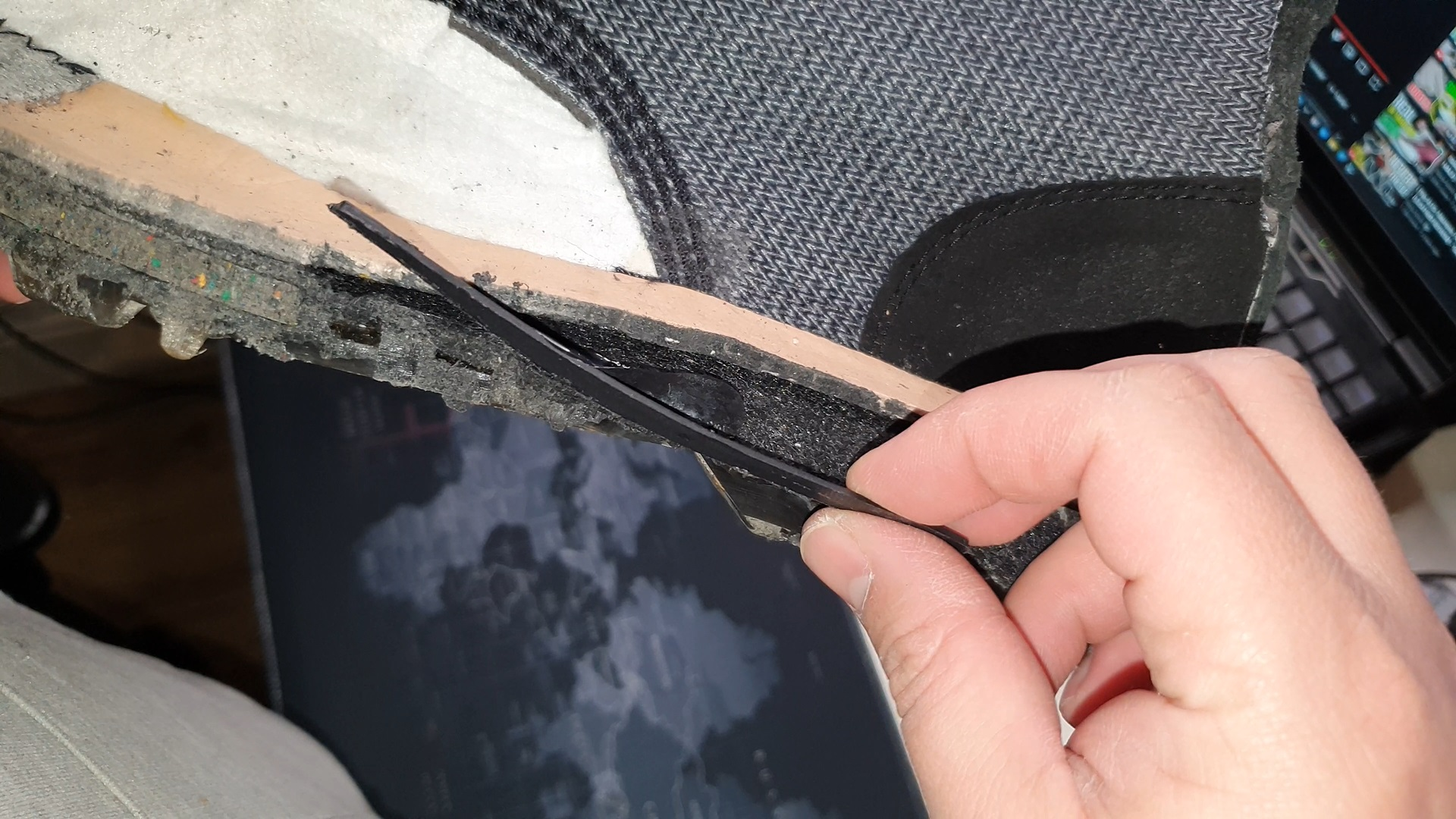
TPU shank in work boots

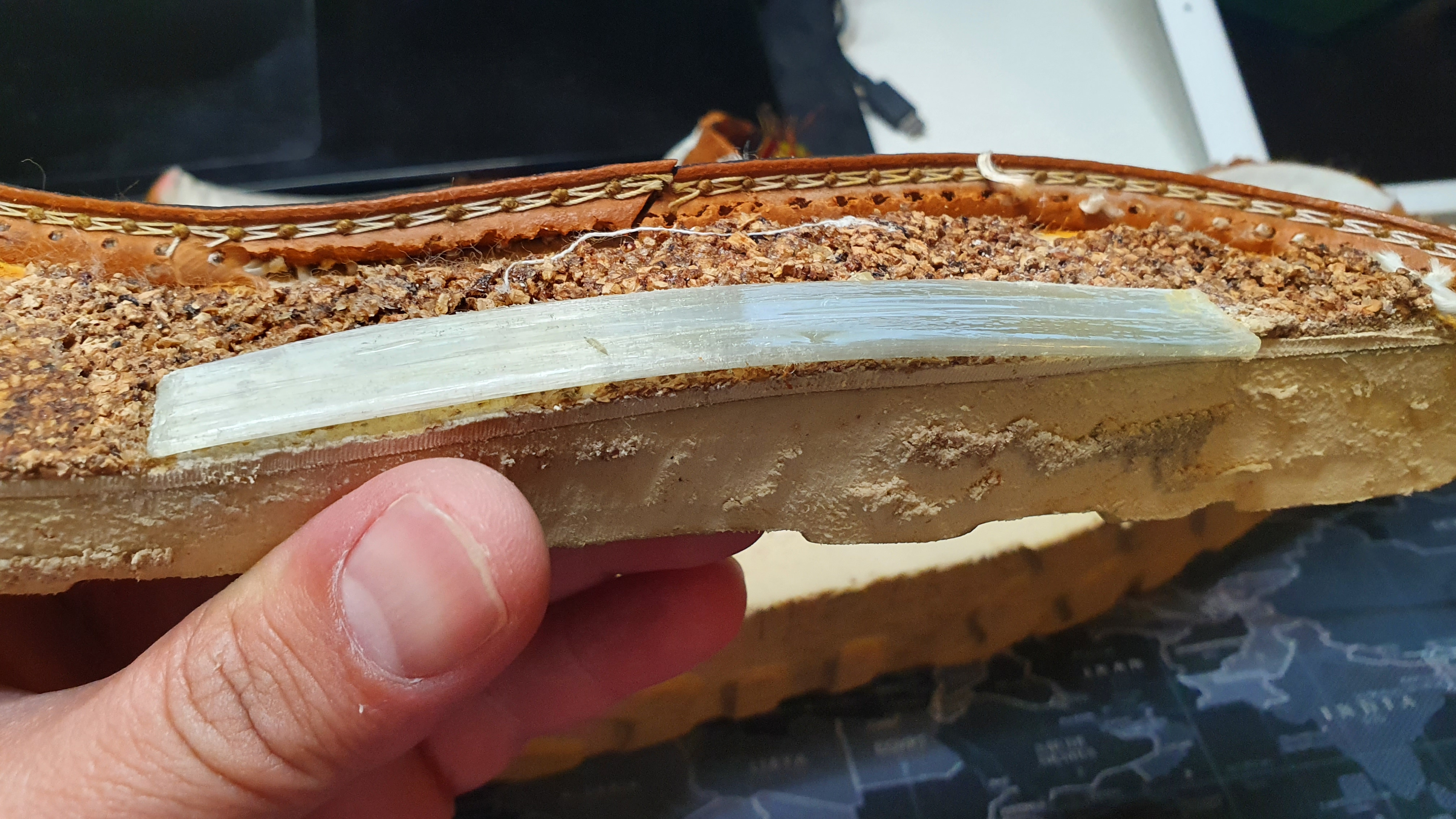
Fiberglass shank in steel toe boots
