= Climbing shoe =

Type of footwear designed for rock climbing

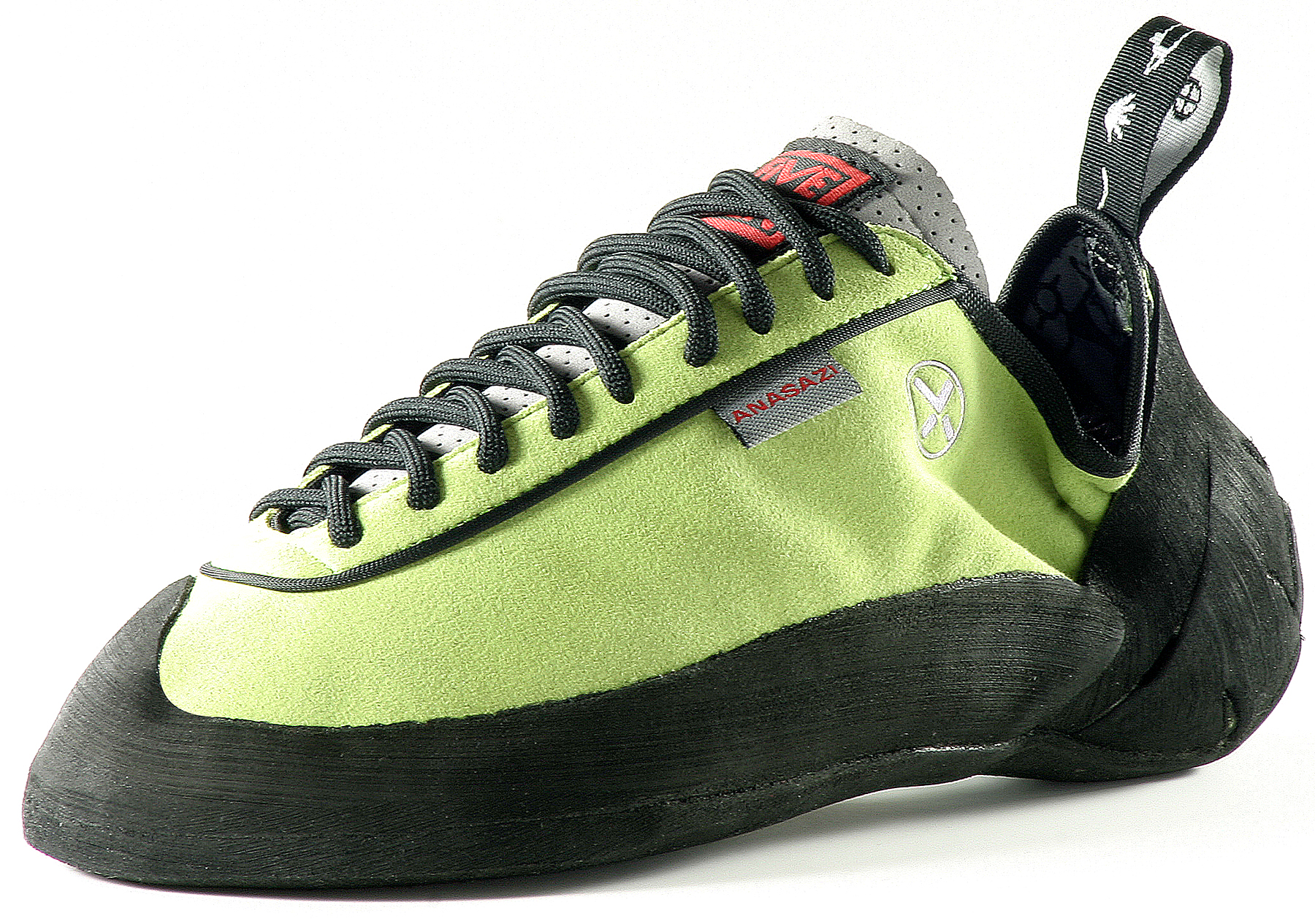

A climbing shoe is a specialized type of footwear designed for rock climbing. Typical climbing shoes have a tight fit, an asymmetrical downturn, and a sticky rubber sole with an extended rubber rand to the heel and the toe. Different types of shoes can be better suited for different levels of technique and routes.

== Design ==
Modern climbing shoes use carefully crafted multi-piece patterns to conform very closely to the wearer's feet. More traditional climbing shoes tend to be stiff, but modern performance oriented models are often quite soft with a flexible midsole.

A typical climbing shoe is made out of nine parts: heel loops, lining, tongue tab, tongue, closure system, upper, toe box, rand, and heel.

=== Materials ===
Leather is the most common upper material, but other materials such as fabric and synthetic leather are also used. The climbing rubber used for soles was developed specifically for rock climbing. The two types of leather used in shoe construction are unlined leather and lined leather. Unlined leather stretches more than its lined counterpart. As such, lined leather is used in areas where stretching is not desired, and occurs the most. Unlined leather is often used on the tongue and tongue tab of the shoe where stretching is desired. Synthetic materials are more rigid and provide ventilation for the shoe; they are often used in the liner, heel loops, and the closure system.

The soles of climbing shoes are made out of special rubber composites. These rubber composites differ depending on the desired stickiness, durability, and softness. Climbing shoes have rubber that are unique to the type of shoe as it molds onto the holds of a wall. There is a tradeoff between stickiness of a rubber and its durability. Stickier shoes provide better performance for climbers, but are worn out quicker.

=== Closure systems ===
Modern climbing shoes come in different closure systems that allow the wearer to adjust the tightness of the shoe.

==== Lace-up shoes ====
Lace-up shoes use a traditional lace, like those on sneakers, that reaches the rand of the shoe. Lace-ups provide climbers with the most adjustability in the shoe's tightness. A climber wearing lace-up shoes can loosen the shoe for walk-off routes or tighten the laces to complete a harder route.

==== Velcro shoes ====
Velcro shoes will often have one or two Velcro straps that allow for the adjustment of tightness. Velcro allows for quicker but less precise adjustments than laced shoes. They are commonly used in indoor-climbing environments because they are easier to take on and off.

==== Slip-on ====
Slip-on shoes do not have any form of adjustable closure, allowing the user to fit their shoes into tighter fitting spaces. They need to be fitted properly in order to prevent the feet from moving inside the shoe. A benefit of this close fit is a higher sensitivity to the climb, allowing the wearer of the shoe to use smaller holds for their feet.

=== Nose types ===
Climbing shoes are typically made with one of two types of noses: pointed or rounded.

==== Pointed ====
Pointed shoes can make it easier for climbers to stand on smaller holds.

==== Rounded ====
Rounded shoes allow all toes to reach the front of the shoe more easily, granting the climber more power when pushing off the wall.

== Shoe types ==
Modern climbing shoes are typically subdivided into three different profiles based on their shape: neutral, moderate, and aggressive.

=== Neutral ===
Neutral shoes, similar to everyday sneakers, feature a flatter outer sole that allows the foot to rest flat during use. According to REI, this style of shoe is best fitted for beginner climbers because of comfort. More experienced climbers may also use neutral shoes to climb longer routes.

=== Moderate ===
Slightly more downturned than the neutral shoe, moderate shoes have a cambered (curved) toe box. They typically have a thinner sole and stickier rubber than neutral shoes. This enables climbers to climb different types of routes, including slab, crack, slight overhangs, and multi-pitch.

=== Aggressive ===
Aggressive shoes feature a stronger downturn than moderate shoes. This style of shoe is often the most painful to wear for climbers due to its strong curve and heel tension. According to REI, they are shaped asymmetrically to allow for climbers to place greater weight on their big toe in footwork techniques. Aggressive shoes, similar to moderate shoes, have thin soles and sticky rubber, giving climbers greater sensitivity in their feet.

== Fit ==
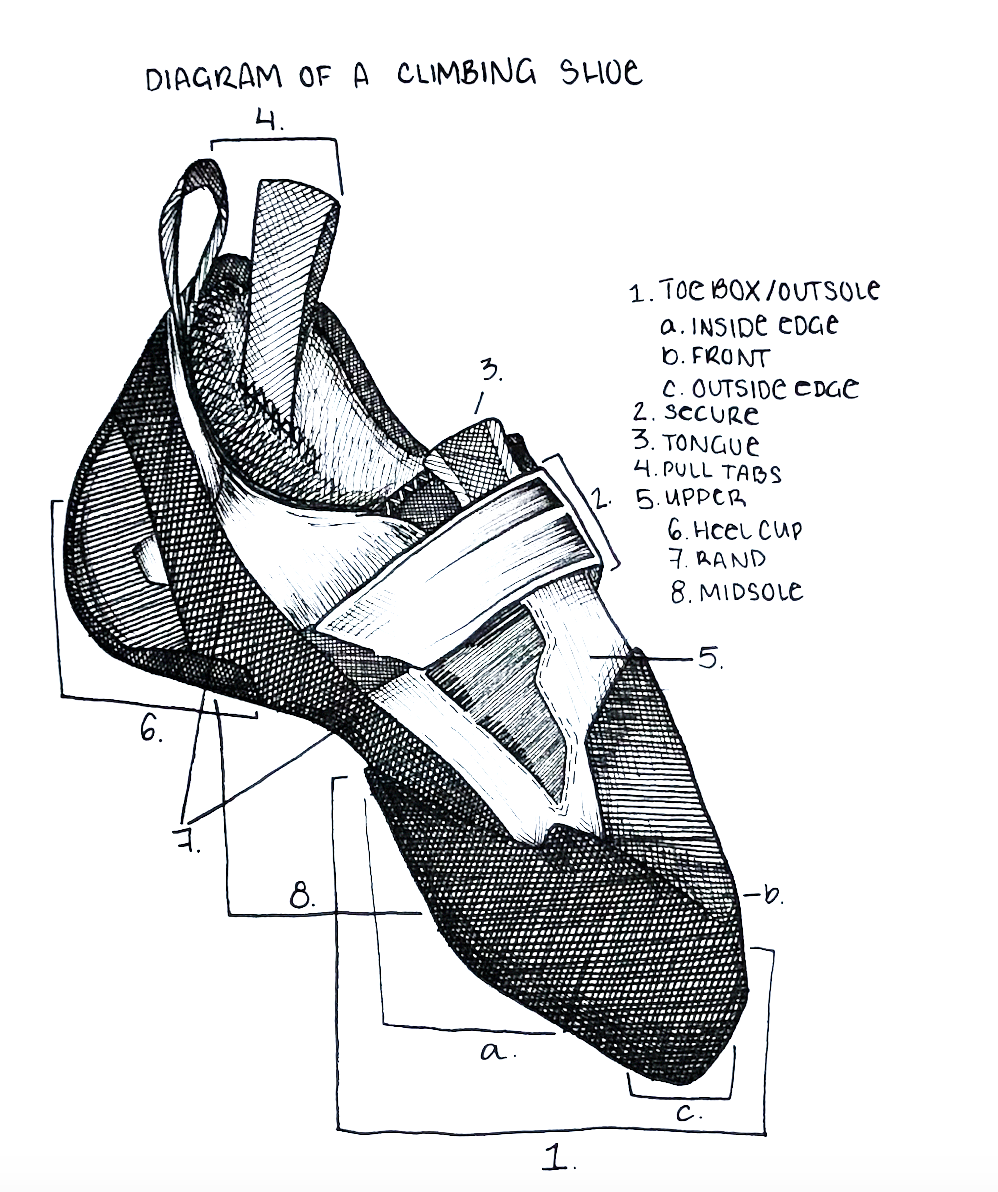
The anatomy of a modern climbing shoe

Climbing shoes fit very closely to support the foot and allow the climber to use small footholds effectively. Most climbers forgo socks in order to achieve a more precise fit. Climbers will typically wear shoes in a way that sometimes uncomfortably constricts their feet. A smaller size allows the toes to be at the front of the shoe, preventing it from shifting inside the shoe, and can allow the climber to generate more force. As a result of their tightness, most climbing shoes, particularly the more aggressive or technical styles, are uncomfortable when properly fitted.

Because pointed shoes may cause the toes to not reach the front of the shoe, this can lead to the use of smaller shoes. Depending on the material of the upper, the shoes may stretch up to an additional two sizes, which can encourage climbers to buy shoes that are even smaller than they typically would. The tight fit of climbing shoes has raised concerns about the impact on climbers' feet. Foot pain or discomfort as a result of tight shoes is a common complaint among climbers. Given their stiff nature, the foot can be compressed while wearing climbing shoes, and chronic injuries and deformities, like hallux valgus and achilles tendinitis, can occur with long-term usage of overly-tight shoes.

== Uses ==
The modern climbing shoe's features leverage a climber's ability to use their feet more technically.

=== Edging ===
Edging is a footwork technique where climbers rely on their toes to step on smaller surfaces. Shoes that are downturned aggressively and have a pointed toe allow the climber to utilize their feet on smaller foot holds. The stiffer the sole of the shoe, the more pressure a climber is able to put on their toes.

=== Smearing ===
Smearing is when a climber uses the sole of their shoe to walk on a wall or a flat surface without any footholds. Shoes with a more sensitive sole made of thinner rubber allow for the climber to have more flexibility in their feet and not use footholds.

=== Toe hook and heel hook ===
A toe hook is when the climber utilizes the rubber on the toe of their shoe to hook their toe onto a hold. A heel hook is when the climber utilizes the rubber on the heel of their shoe to hook their heel onto a hold. The rubber allows for greater frictional support and adherence between the shoe and the hold.

== History ==
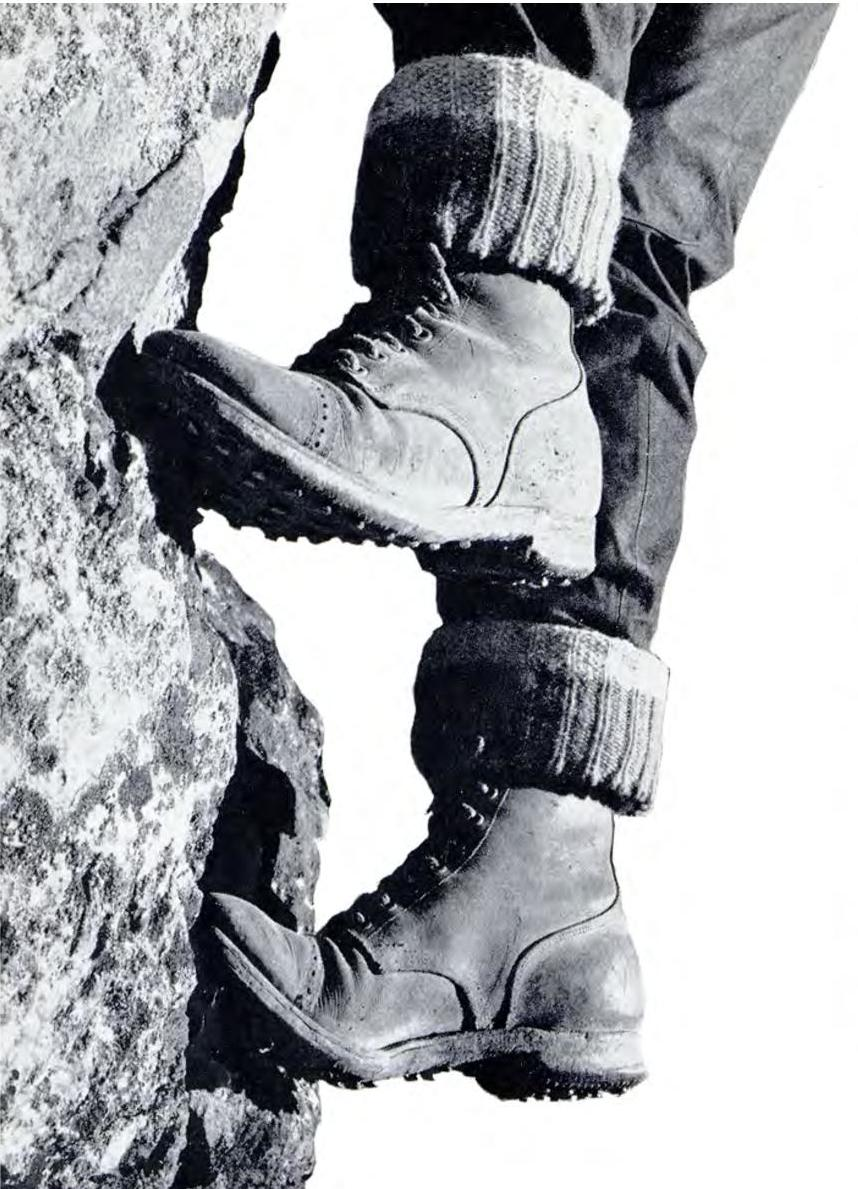
Early rock climbers used heavy-soled mountaineering boots.

Early rock climbers used heavy-soled mountaineering boots studded with metal cleats and hobnails. An advance on this for dry rock was boots with Vibram soles, with a pattern of rubber studs developed by Vitale Bramani in Italy in the 1930s.

In postwar Britain, a new generation of climbers like Joe Brown began to climb harder routes wearing plimsolls (rubber-soled canvas sneakers), sometimes with woollen socks over them to improve grip.

Pierre Allain was an enthusiastic French rock climber who experimented with hard composite rubber-soled canvas boots; by the late 1950s, his "PA" boots were being used by climbers worldwide. Fellow French climber Edmond Bourdonneau later introduced "EB" boots in 1950 after purchasing Allain's company, which had softer rubber soles and became very popular in the 1960 and 1970s.

In 1982, Boreal, a Spanish company located in Villena, produced the "Firé" style of shoe with a revolutionary sticky rubber sole.

== Repairs ==
A climbing shoe will deteriorate at different rates depending on the habits of the climber wearing it. The sole may wear down or delaminate from the rand, and important seams can fray which endangers the structural integrity of the shoe. A study done on consumer practices suggests that users will either repair or purchase new objects when faced with worn materials that affect service. It was found that consumers tend to choose to repair products when the practice allows them to maintain a habit, such as having broken-in shoes that the consumer would prefer to wear instead of a new pair. When climbing shoes experience wear, especially damage that prevents use, they can be sent to a resoler. The resoler can perform repairs such as a half-resole or a re-rand to mend the shoes. A resole will not change how the shoe fits or is shaped, which allows the consumer to maintain their habits. A re-rand is required for more damaged shoes, which can impact the shoe's shape. If a shoe that experiences wear is left unrepaired for too long, it may reach a point where it can no longer be mended and a new pair must be purchased.

== Health concerns ==
=== Downsizing ===
A vast majority of climbers choose to use tight climbing shoes since less restrictive shoes leave room for the foot to slip around inside the shoe and can make it harder for individuals to gain stability on smaller climbing surfaces. Smaller climbing shoes are especially common among more elite climbers. Tighter shoes can help improve a climber's ability, so many climbers are willing to compromise their foot comfort. The climbing culture around smaller shoes has garnered attention regarding the health of climbers’ feet. The smaller fit has been shown to stunt bone growth in younger climbers and have lasting injuries and deformities. The injuries and health complications related to tight climbing shoes have also prompted research into developing more appropriate climbing shoes. One group of researchers has developed a climbing shoe prototype that molds to the foot for a more natural fit with features that accommodate the variance in foot width among climbers. The findings from this prototype show that different shoe designs can help reduce the risk of injury while maintaining climbers’ ability level.

=== Inhalation of rubber particles ===
Rubber-derived chemicals (RDCs) are chemicals that may be harmful to humans when ingested and can be found in high concentrations in the rubber soles of climbing shoes. The rubber additives are released into the air when the rubber wears down through use. A study has found that there are higher levels of RDCs present in indoor climbing gyms compared to other environments where climbing shoes are not typically worn. Adults who frequent these gyms inhale more RDCs than the average person, and this raises potential health concerns about rubber additive levels in climbing shoes’ soles.

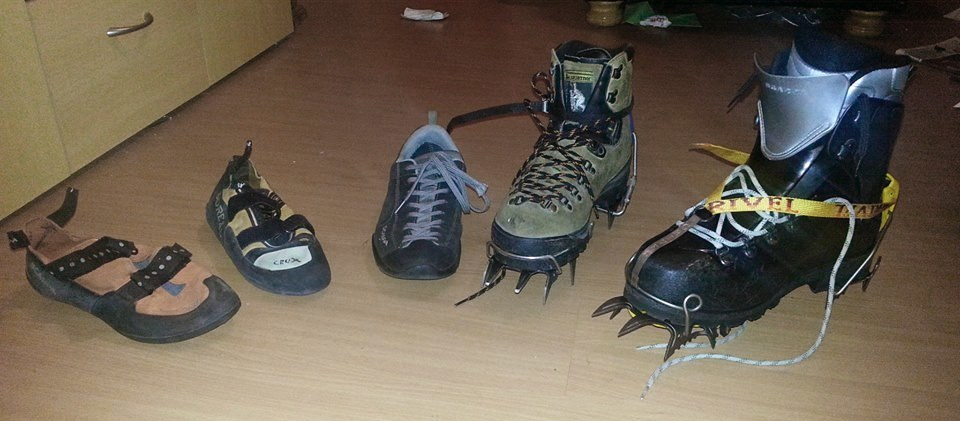
L-R: Two rock climbing shoes, an approach shoe, a leather boot and a plastic mountaineering boot, last two with automatic crampons

== Manufacturers ==
- Black Diamond Equipment
- Five Ten Footwear (owned by Adidas)
- La Sportiva
- Mammut Sports Group
- Millet
- Quechua
- Scarpa

== See also ==
- List of shoe styles
- Approach shoe
