= Approach shoe =

Combination of hiking boot and a rock-climbing shoe

Approach shoes are hybrid footwear that have some characteristics in common with hiking boots, and others with rock-climbing shoes. Like a shoe or boot designed for hiking, a properly-fitting approach shoe can be worn comfortably while walking for long distances. Like a climbing shoe, it generally has a specialized sticky rubber sole that maintains traction on steeper grades of rock. On more extreme terrain, or when carrying heavier loads, it supports neither task as well as more specialised footwear would.

Approach shoes typically also lack effective insulation in the soles, limiting their effectiveness for hiking over hot surfaces or in cold conditions.

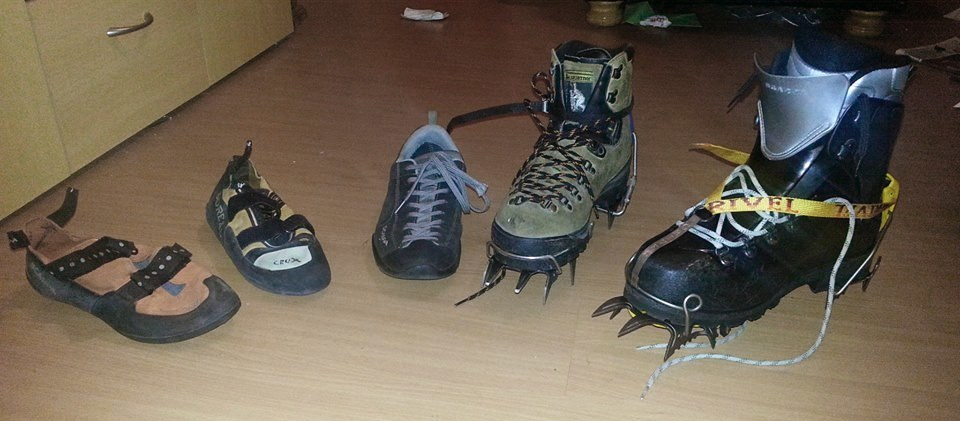
L-R: Two rock climbing shoes, an approach shoe, a leather boot and a plastic mountaineering boot, last two with automatic crampons

== See also ==
- Comparison of orthotics
- Trail running shoe
