= Five Ten Footwear =

German outdoor footwear manufacturer

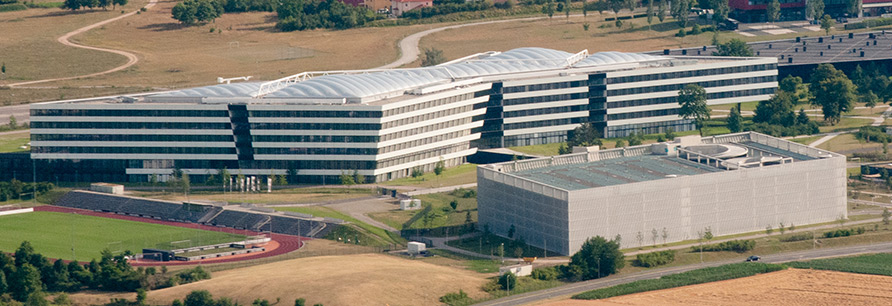
- Five Ten Footwear Headquarters in Herzogenaurach, Germany
- Formerly: Five Ten USA (1985–2011); Five Ten Footwear, Inc. (2011–2020)
- Type: Subsidiary
- Industry: Sportswear; Footwear industry; Outdoor recreation
- Founded: January 1, 1985; 41 years ago in Redlands, California, U.S.
- Founder: Charles Cole
- Headquarters: Herzogenaurach, Germany
- Area served: Worldwide
- Key people: Charles Cole (Founder; d. 2018); Rolf Reinschmidt (Adidas Outdoor SVP)
- Products: Climbing shoes; Mountain bike shoes; Approach shoes; Performance apparel
- Brands: Anasazi; Freerider; NIAD; Guide Tennie; Camp Four; Sleuth
- Number of employees: Approx. 50–100 (before integration)
- Parent: Adidas (acquired 2011)
- Website: adidas.com

Five Ten Footwear (branded as Five Ten) is a German manufacturer of outdoor recreation footwear, focusing on rock climbing, mountain biking, and approach shoes. It was founded in 1985 by climber and engineer Charles Cole in California. Cole, an accomplished rock climber with an engineering background, developed Five Ten's signature Stealth Rubber compound in 1986. This high-friction rubber, often described as the "stickiest rubber in the world," gave Five Ten climbing shoes exceptional grip and was later adapted for use in the brand's mountain bike footwear. The company's early lineup included the Guide Tennie, often cited as the first modern approach shoe, and its sticky-soled footwear gained a loyal following among climbers and cyclists for its high performance.

In 2011 Adidas acquired Five Ten, integrating it into the Adidas Terrex outdoor division. The brand's headquarters were relocated to Herzogenaurach, Germany, where it now operates as a sub-brand. Cole died in 2018 at age 63 and is remembered as a pioneer in climbing shoe innovation, especially for inventing Stealth Rubber.

== History ==
=== Founding and Early Innovation (1985–1990s) ===
Five Ten was founded in 1985 by climber and engineer Charles Cole in California. The company's name references the difficulty grade "5.10" in the Yosemite Decimal System, symbolizing the level where climbing becomes especially challenging. Cole was inspired to start the company after nearly slipping on a descent in Yosemite National Park, prompting him to develop footwear with improved grip.

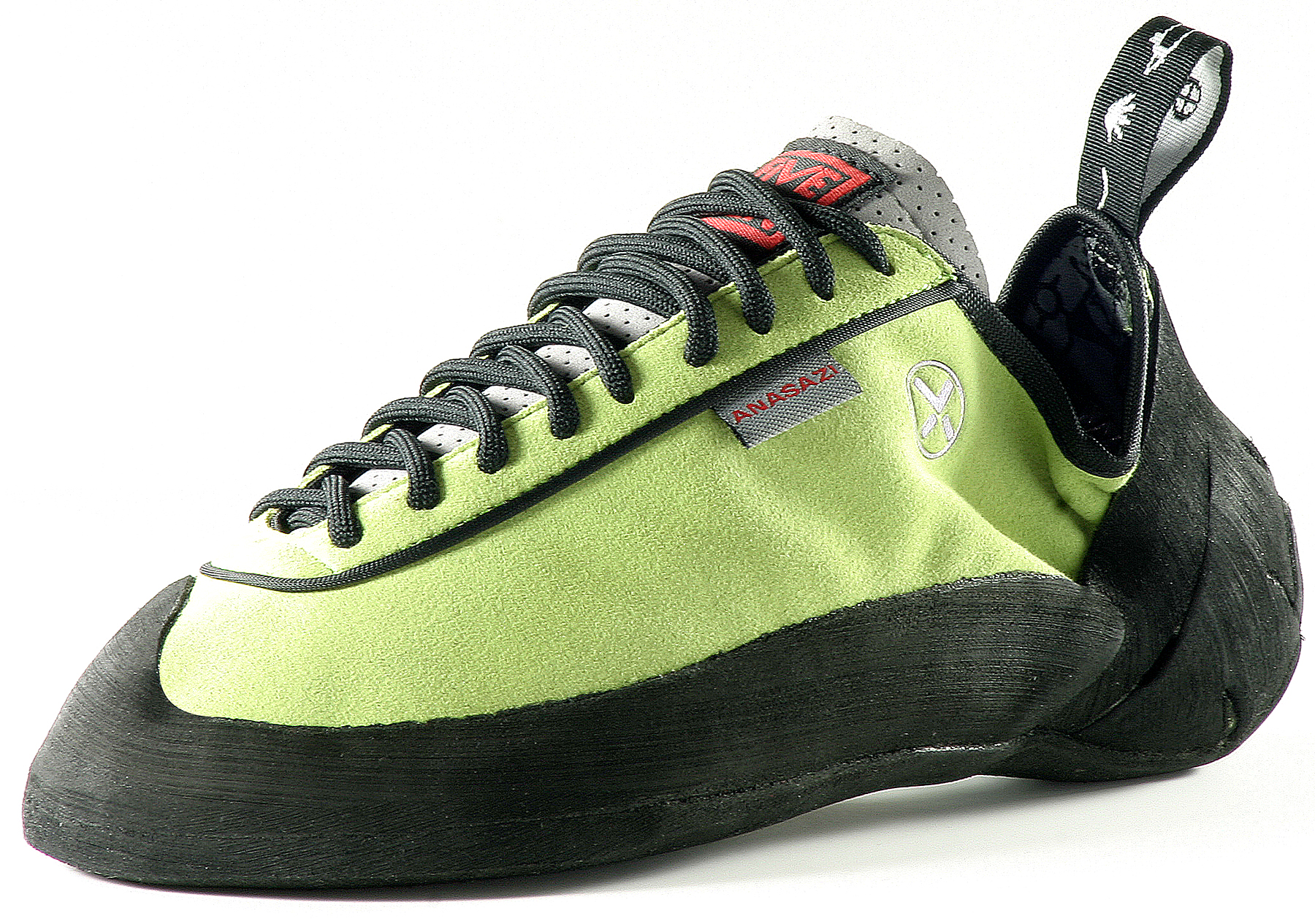
Original Five Ten Anasazi Verde

That same year Five Ten released the first modern approach shoe, the Five Tennie, designed for both hiking and scrambling. More significantly, Cole collaborated with chemists to formulate a proprietary rubber compound—later called Stealth Rubber. Introduced in 1986, Stealth Rubber provided unprecedented grip on rock, and soon became a revolutionary advancement in rock climbing footwear.

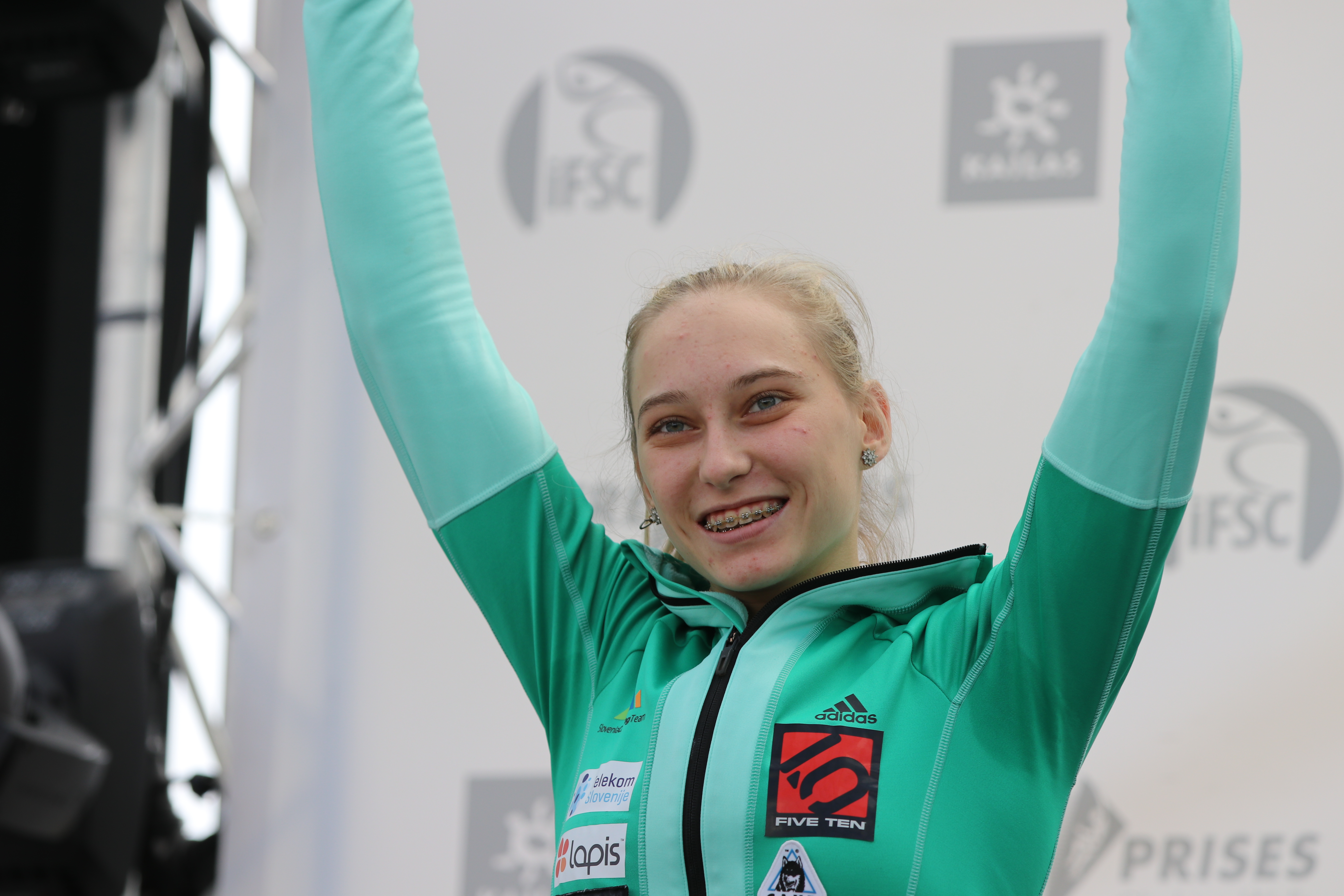
Janja Garnbret, 2× Olympic gold medalist and Adidas Five Ten athlete, competing at the 2020 Tokyo Olympics

Throughout the late 1980s and early 1990s, Five Ten expanded into performance climbing shoes. Its flagship models, such as the Anasazi line (MoccAsym, VCS, and Lace-up), quickly gained popularity among elite climbers and were featured on many of the hardest ascents of the era. At the same time, the Guide Tennie remained a popular choice among climbers needing durable approach shoes available in both canvas and leather.

=== Expansion into Mountain Biking (Late 1990s–2000s) ===
In the late 1990s mountain bikers began using Five Ten's sticky-soled shoes for better grip on flat pedals. This led to the release of the brand's first mountain bike-specific shoe, the Impact, originally produced in collaboration with Intense Cycles.

Five Ten quickly became a dominant force in flat-pedal mountain biking, sponsoring top riders like Sam Hill, Greg Minnaar, and Danny MacAskill. Hill famously won several UCI Mountain Bike World Championships while using flat pedals and Five Ten shoes, challenging the era's dominance of clipless systems.

By the mid-2000s Five Ten had become synonymous with performance in flat‑pedal mountain biking—praised for its exceptional pedal grip, enabling riders like Sam Hill to compete at the highest levels without clipless pedals.

=== Athlete Sponsorships and Brand Growth (2000s–2011) ===
Five Ten has sponsored a wide range of professional athletes across disciplines to elevate the visibility of its products. In climbing, the brand has worked with top athletes including Shauna Coxsey, Dave Graham, Janja Garnbret, Sasha DiGiulian, Tyler Landman, Ammon McNeely, and Dean Potter, representing disciplines from bouldering and sport climbing to big wall and alpine climbing.

Its shoes became standard gear in climbing gyms and competitions, and the Stealth Rubber was even used to resole shoes from other brands. By the early 2010s, Five Ten had become one of the most recognized performance footwear brands in climbing and MTB.

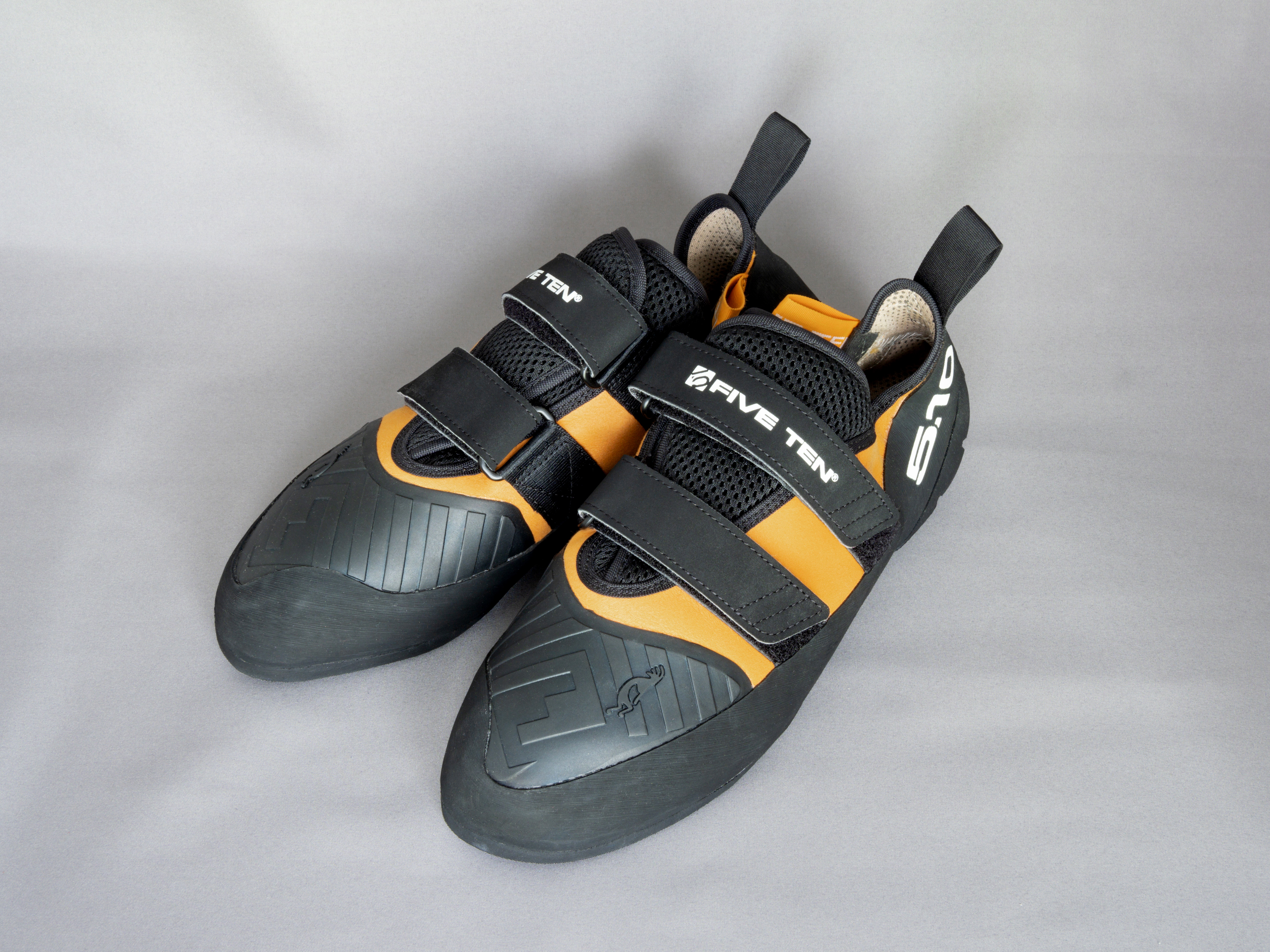
Five Ten Anasazi Pro climbing shoe in orange

=== Adidas Acquisition and Corporate Transition (2011–2020) ===
In November 2011 Adidas acquired Five Ten for US$25 million to bolster its outdoor division. The acquisition brought Five Ten's Stealth Rubber technology under Adidas's umbrella, and expanded its global distribution.

Founder Charles Cole remained involved for a time post-acquisition, particularly in R&D. Adidas continued supporting climbing and MTB athletes, eventually rebranding the company as Adidas Five Ten. New high-performance models were introduced, including the Aleon (designed with Fred Nicole) and modernized versions of classic shoes like the NIAD (a successor to the Anasazi).

In 2017 Adidas closed Five Ten's Redlands, California HQ and relocated remaining operations to Germany. Some former employees went on to found Unparallel Sports, a climbing shoe brand based in California, aiming to preserve the original craftsmanship. Charles Cole died in 2018 at age 63.

By April 2020 Five Ten had been fully integrated as a sub-brand within Adidas's Adidas Terrex line.

=== Recent Developments (2020s) ===
Adidas Five Ten has emphasized sustainability in recent years. In 2021, it released bike shoes made with Parley Ocean Plastic, aligning with Adidas's sustainability goals. The brand also launched eco-conscious biking apparel and expanded its market reach through cross-discipline innovation.

In climbing, Adidas Five Ten athletes, including Janja Garnbret and Miho Nonaka, have achieved international success at the 2020 Tokyo Olympics: Garnbret took gold and Nonaka earned silver—raising the brand's profile worldwide.

As of 2025 Five Ten continues to serve as the performance footwear division within Adidas's outdoor category, upholding its legacy in climbing, mountain biking, and approach footwear through continued innovation, athlete sponsorship, and product evolution.

== Culture and Influence ==
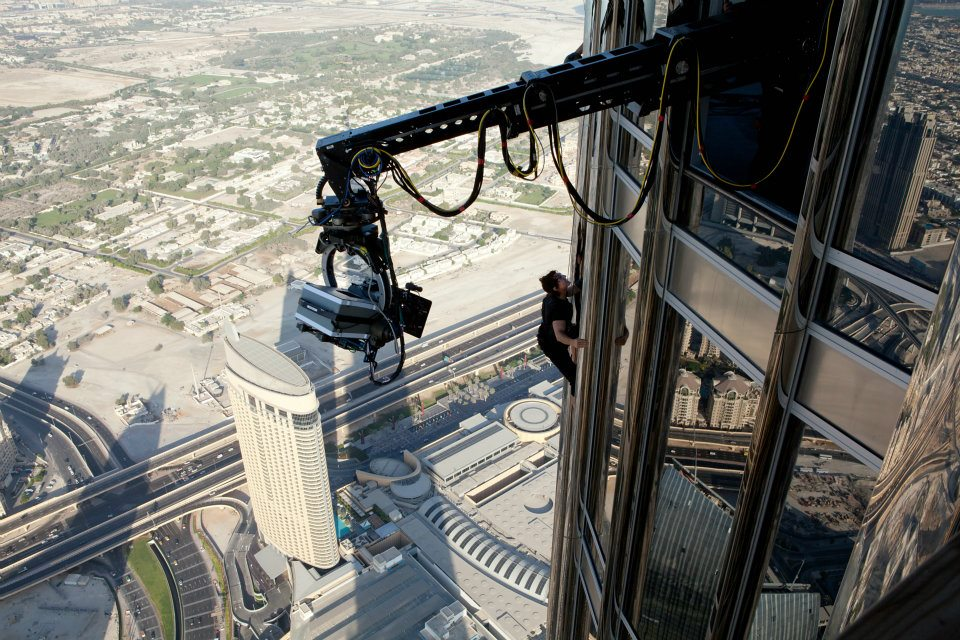
Behind the scenes of Mission: Impossible – Ghost Protocol, where actor Tom Cruise wore custom footwear featuring Five Ten’s Stealth MI6 rubber for the Burj Khalifa climbing scene.

Five Ten's proprietary Stealth Rubber compounds have found applications beyond outdoor sports, notably in film and stunt work. The most prominent example came during the filming of Mission: Impossible – Ghost Protocol (2011), in which actor Tom Cruise scaled the exterior of the Burj Khalifa in Dubai. Cruise wore custom footwear made with Stealth MI6 rubber, a soft, ultra-high-friction formulation originally engineered by Five Ten for the scene's demands.

The development of Stealth MI6 showcased the brand's innovation in blending high performance with stealth applications, and reinforced its relevance beyond traditional sports. Five Ten's rubber compounds have also seen use in military applications, canyoneering, and as part of robotics and prosthetic grip systems due to their combination of tackiness and durability.

== See also ==
- List of outdoor industry parent companies
