= Akiyo Noguchi in the Climbing World Cup =

From 2005 to 2021

Akiyo Noguchi first competed in the Climbing World Cup in 2005 in lead discipline that took place in Shanghai, China. In 2007, she started competing in bouldering and won her first World Cup medal (silver) in Sofia, Bulgaria. In 2008, she won her first gold medal in Bouldering World Cup in Montauban, France. Over the years, she has competed in both lead and boulder, with more success in the latter. Noguchi attended her final IFSC Climbing World Cup in Innsbruck in June 2021, finishing a career of 149 World Cups and 68 podium places.

== Results ==
Year	Date	Location	Rank	Discipline
2005	October 22	Shanghai, China	15	Lead
2006	May 19	Dresden, Germany	16	Lead
2006	August 5	Singapore	9	Lead
2006	September 16	Marbella, Spain	14	Lead
2007	April 20	Sofia, Bulgaria	2nd	Boulder
2007	April 27	Hall, Austria	4	Boulder
2007	June 8	Grindelwald, Switzerland	2nd	Boulder
2007	June 15	Zürich, Switzerland	24	Lead
2007	June 22	Fiera di Primiero, Italy	3rd	Boulder
2007	August 11	Qinghai, China	17	Lead
2007	October 13	Kazo, Japan	12	Lead
2008	April 18	Hall, Austria	4	Boulder
2008	May 2	Réunion, France	2nd	Boulder
2008	May 30	Grindelwald, Switzerland	3rd	Boulder
2008	June 13	Fiera di Primiero, Italy	10	Boulder
2008	July 4	Montauban, France	1st	Boulder
2008	July 12	Chamonix, France	13	Lead
2008	September 12	Bern, Switzerland	5	Lead
2008	September 19	Imst, Austria	6	Lead
2008	September 26	Puurs, Belgium	5	Lead
2008	October 31	Moscow, Russia	6	Boulder
2008	November 15	Kranj, Slovenia	3rd	Lead
2009	April 11	Kazo, Japan	1st	Boulder
2009	May 1	Hall, Austria	1st	Boulder
2009	May 29	Wien, Austria	2nd	Boulder
2009	June 5	Vail, United States	3rd	Boulder
2009	June 12	Eindhoven, Netherlands	1st	Boulder
2009	July 12	Chamonix, France	10	Lead
2009	September 25	Puurs, Belgium	13	Lead
2009	November 6	Brno, Czech Republic	7	Lead
2009	November 14	Kranj, Slovenia	2nd	Lead
2010	May 14	Greifensee, Switzerland	2nd	Boulder
2010	May 28	Wien, Austria	1st	Boulder
2010	June 4	Vail, United States	7	Boulder
2010	June 17	Moscow, Russia	4	Boulder
2010	June 25	Eindhoven, Netherlands	4	Boulder
2010	July 3	Sheffield, United Kingdom	3rd	Boulder
2010	July 30	Munich, Germany	1st	Boulder
2010	August 20	Xining, China	3rd	Lead
2010	August 28	Chuncheon, South Korea	9	Lead
2010	October 29	Huaiji, China	9	Lead
2010	November 13	Kranj, Slovenia	3rd	Lead
2011	April 14	Milan, Italy	4	Boulder
2011	May 7	Log-Dragomer, Slovenia	2nd	Boulder
2011	May 13	Vienna, Austria	7	Boulder
2011	May 27	Canmore, Canada	1st	Boulder
2011	June 3	Vail, United States	5	Boulder
2011	June 17	Eindhoven, Netherlands	1st	Boulder
2011	June 25	Barcelona, Spain	1st	Boulder
2011	July 2	Sheffield, United Kingdom	1st	Boulder
2011	August 19	Munich, Germany	6	Boulder
2011	September 30	Puurs, Belgium	5	Lead
2011	October 8	Boulder, United States	6	Lead
2012	April 13	Chongqing, China	1st	Boulder
2012	April 21	Log-Dragomer, Slovenia	5	Boulder
2012	April 27	Vienna, Austria	1st	Boulder
2012	May 18	Innsbruck, Austria	7	Boulder
2012	June 1	Vail, United States	11	Boulder
2012	August 25	Munich, Germany	1st	Boulder
2012	September 21	Puurs, Belgium	6	Lead
2012	October 20	Mokpo, South Korea	5	Lead
2012	October 27	Inzai, Japan	6	Lead
2012	November 17	Kranj, Slovenia	5	Lead
2013	March 22	Chongqing, China	4	Boulder
2013	April 5	Millau, France	3rd	Boulder
2013	April 26	Kitzbühel, Austria	2nd	Boulder
2013	May 11	Log-Dragomer, Slovenia	4	Boulder
2013	May 17	Innsbruck, Austria	3rd	Boulder
2013	June 1	Toronto, Canada	2nd	Boulder
2013	June 7	Vail, United States	2nd	Boulder
2013	July 19	Briançon, France	6	Lead
2013	August 24	Munich, Germany	9	Boulder
2013	September 20	Puurs, Belgium	5	Lead
2013	October 11	Mokpo, South Korea	7	Lead
2013	October 19	Wujiang, China	9	Lead
2013	November 1	Valence, France	7	Lead
2013	November 16	Kranj, Slovenia	2nd	Lead
2014	April 26	Chongqing, China	3rd	Boulder
2014	May 3	Baku, Azerbaijan	2nd	Boulder
2014	May 10	Grindelwald, Switzerland	4	Boulder
2014	May 16	Innsbruck, Austria	3rd	Boulder
2014	May 31	Toronto, Canada	1st	Boulder
2014	June 6	Vail, United States	1st	Boulder
2014	June 20	Haiyang, China	1st	Boulder
2014	June 27	Laval, France	1st	Boulder
2014	July 10	Chamonix, France	6	Lead
2014	July 19	Briançon, France	7	Lead
2014	October 25	Inzai, Japan	4	Lead
2014	November 15	Kranj, Slovenia	3rd	Lead
2015	May 30	Toronto, Canada	2nd	Boulder
2015	June 5	Vail, United States	2nd	Boulder
2015	June 20	Chongqing, China	1st	Boulder
2015	June 26	Haiyang, China	2nd	Boulder
2015	August 14	Munich, Germany	4	Boulder
2015	November 14	Kranj, Slovenia	13	Lead
2016	April 15	Meiringen, Switzerland	4	Boulder
2016	April 23	Kazo, Japan	20	Boulder
2016	April 30	Chongqing, China	2nd	Boulder
2016	May 14	Navi Mumbai, India	3rd	Boulder
2016	May 20	Innsbruck, Austria	6	Boulder
2016	June 10	Vail, United States	8	Boulder
2016	August 12	Munich, Germany	3rd	Boulder
2016	October 22	Xiamen, China	4	Lead
2016	November 26	Kranj, Slovenia	2nd	Lead
2017	April 7	Meiringen, Switzerland	21	Boulder
2017	April 22	Chongqing, China	3rd	Boulder
2017	April 29	Nanjing, China	13	Boulder
2017	May 6	Hachioji, Tokyo, Japan	2nd	Boulder
2017	June 9	Vail, United States	2nd	Boulder
2017	June 24	Navi Mumbai, India	3rd	Boulder
2017	August 18	Munich, Germany	3rd	Boulder
2017	October 7	Wujiang, China	4	Lead
2017	October 14	Xiamen, China	6	Lead
2017	November 11	Kranj, Slovenia	9	Lead
2018	April 13	Meiringen, Switzerland	3rd	Boulder
2018	April 21	Moscow, Russia	53	Speed
2018	April 21	Moscow, Russia	3rd	Boulder
2018	May 5	Chongqing, China	33	Speed
2018	May 5	Chongqing, China	1st	Boulder
2018	May 12	Tai'an, China	35	Speed
2018	May 12	Tai'an, China	1st	Boulder
2018	June 2	Hachioji, Japan	1st	Boulder
2018	June 8	Vail, United States	3rd	Boulder
2018	July 6	Villars, Switzerland	39	Speed
2018	July 6	Villars, Switzerland	5	Lead
2018	July 11	Chamonix, France	49	Speed
2018	July 11	Chamonix, France	7	Lead
2018	August 17	Munich, Germany	3rd	Boulder
2018	October 20	Wujiang, China	26	Speed
2018	October 20	Wujiang, China	4	Lead
2018	October 27	Xiamen, China	28	Speed
2018	October 27	Xiamen, China	3rd	Lead
2019	April 5	Meiringen, Switzerland	2nd	Boulder
2019	April 26	Chongqing, China	30	Speed
2019	April 26	Chongqing, China	2nd	Boulder
2019	May 3	Wujiang, China	34	Speed
2019	May 3	Wujiang, China	2nd	Boulder
2019	June 7	Vail, United States	2nd	Boulder
2019	July 3	Villars, Switzerland	4	Lead
2019	July 3	Villars, Switzerland	30	Speed
2019	July 11	Chamonix, France	10	Lead
2019	July 11	Chamonix, France	37	Speed
2019	October 20	Xiamen, China	2nd	Lead
2019	October 27	Inzai, Japan	4	Lead
2021	April 17	Meiringen, Switzerland	4	Boulder
2021	May 31	Salt Lake City, United States	13	Speed
2021	May 31	Salt Lake City, United States	18	Boulder
2021	June 26	Innsbruck, Austria	3rd	Lead
2021	June 26	Innsbruck, Austria	5	Boulder
