= 2011 IFSC Climbing World Cup =

International sport climbing competition

- Location: Milan, Italy Log-Dragomer, Slovenia; Vienna, Austria; Canmore, Canada; Vail, United States; Eindhoven, Netherlands; Barcelona, Spain; Sheffield, United Kingdom; Chamonix, France; Briançon, France; Daone, Italy; Munich, Germany; Xining, China; Changzhi, China; Puurs, Belgium; Boulder, United States; Amman, Jordan; Kranj, Slovenia; Kranj, Slovenia Barcelona, Spain
- Date: 14 April – 27 November 2011

Champions
- Men: (B) (Austria) Kilian Fischhuber (L) (Austria) Jakob Schubert (S) (Poland) Lukasz Swirk (C) (Austria) Jakob Schubert
- Women: (B) (Austria) Anna Stöhr (L) (Slovenia) Mina Markovič (S) (Poland) Edyta Ropek (C) (Slovenia) Mina Markovič

The 2011 IFSC Climbing World Cup was held in 20 locations. Bouldering competitions were held in 9 locations, lead in 10 locations, and speed in 5 locations. The season began on 14 April in Milan, Italy and concluded on 27 November in Barcelona, Spain.

The top 3 in each competition received medals, and the overall winners were awarded trophies. At the end of the season an overall ranking was determined based upon points, which athletes were awarded for finishing in the top 30 of each individual event.

The winners for bouldering were Kilian Fischhuber and Anna Stöhr, for lead Jakob Schubert and Mina Markovič, for speed Lukasz Swirk and Edyta Ropek, and for combined Jakob Schubert and Mina Markovič, men and women respectively. The National Team for bouldering was France, for lead Austria, and for speed Russian Federation.

== Highlights of the season ==
In bouldering, at the World Cup in Vail, Kilian Fischhuber of Austria flashed all boulders in the final round to take the win. Then at the World Cup in Munich, Dmitrii Sharafutdinov of Russia also flashed all boulders in the final round to take the win. At the end of the season, Austrian athletes, Kilian Fischhuber and Anna Stöhr clinched the overall titles of the season for men and women respectively, making it double bouldering titles for Austria.

In speed climbing, at the end of the season, Polish athletes, Lukasz Swirk and Edyta Ropek clinched the overall titles of the season for men and women respectively, making it double speed titles for Poland.

== Overview ==
No.	Location	D	G	Gold	Silver	Bronze
1	(Italy) Milan; 14–17 April 2011	B	M	(Austria) Kilian Fischhuber; 4t9 4b5	(Austria) Jakob Schubert; 3t3 3b3	(Russia) Rustam Gelmanov; 3t6 3b6
1	(Italy) Milan; 14–17 April 2011	B	W	(South Korea) Jain Kim; 3t5 3b4	(Austria) Anna Stöhr; 2t4 4b7	(France) Mélissa Le Nevé; 2t4 4b9
1	(Italy) Milan; 14–17 April 2011	S	M	(Russia) Sergei Sinitcyn; 6.650	(Russia) Evgenii Vaitsekhovskii fall	(Czech Republic) Libor Hroza; 6.930
1	(Italy) Milan; 14–17 April 2011	S	W	(Russia) Kseniia Alekseeva; 9.960	(Russia) Mariia Krasavina; 10.350	(Poland) Edyta Ropek; 9.970
2	(Slovenia) Log-Dragomer; 7–8 May 2011	B	M	(France) Guillaume Glairon Mondet; 3t3 4b6	(Russia) Dmitrii Sharafutdinov; 3t6 4b9	(Austria) Kilian Fischhuber; 2t3 4b6
2	(Slovenia) Log-Dragomer; 7–8 May 2011	B	W	(Austria) Anna Stöhr; 2t3 4b6	(Japan) Akiyo Noguchi; 2t6 3b6	(United States) Alex Puccio; 1t3 3b6
3	(Austria) Vienna; 13–14 May 2011	B	M	(Russia) Dmitrii Sharafutdinov; 1t4 4b7	(Slovenia) Klemen Becan; 1t5 4b12	(Austria) Lukas Ennemoser; 0t 3b9
3	(Austria) Vienna; 13–14 May 2011	B	W	(Austria) Anna Stöhr; 4t13 4b4	(United States) Alex Puccio; 2t2 3b3	(Ukraine) Olga Shalagina; 1t1 3b3
4	(Canada) Canmore; 27–28 May 2011	B	M	(Japan) Tsukuru Hori; 2t3 4b9	(Slovenia) Klemen Becan; 2t5 4b9	(Canada) Sean McColl; 1t2 3b5
4	(Canada) Canmore; 27–28 May 2011	B	W	(Japan) Akiyo Noguchi; 4t9 4b7	(Austria) Anna Stöhr; 4t10 4b6	(South Korea) Jain Kim; 3t12 4b14
5	(United States) Vail; 3–4 June 2011	B	M	(Austria) Kilian Fischhuber; 4t4 4b4	(Russia) Dmitrii Sharafutdinov; 4t5 4b5	(Germany) Jonas Baumann; 2t4 4b6
5	(United States) Vail; 3–4 June 2011	B	W	(Austria) Anna Stöhr; 4t7 4b7	(United States) Alex Puccio; 3t3 3b3	(France) Mélissa Le Nevé; 3t8 4b9
6	(Netherlands) Eindhoven; 17–18 June 2011	B	M	(Austria) Kilian Fischhuber; 4t5 4b4	(United States) Daniel Woods; 4t6 4b5	(France) François Kaiser; 3t5 4b4
6	(Netherlands) Eindhoven; 17–18 June 2011	B	W	(Japan) Akiyo Noguchi; 4t6 4b5	(Austria) Anna Stöhr; 4t8 4b7	(France) Mélissa Le Nevé; 3t6 4b6
7	(Spain) Barcelona; 25–26 June 2011	B	M	(France) Guillaume Glairon Mondet; 2t2 4b4	(Russia) Rustam Gelmanov; 2t2 3b3	(Russia) Dmitrii Sharafutdinov; 2t5 4b8
7	(Spain) Barcelona; 25–26 June 2011	B	W	(Japan) Akiyo Noguchi; 4t8 4b4	(United States) Alex Puccio; 2t4 3b3	(France) Mélissa Le Nevé; 2t4 3b3
8	(United Kingdom) Sheffield; 2–3 July 2011	B	M	(Austria) Kilian Fischhuber; 2t3 3b4	(Switzerland) Cédric Lachat; 2t5 4b9	(Russia) Alexey Rubtsov; 2t13 4b13
8	(United Kingdom) Sheffield; 2–3 July 2011	B	W	(Japan) Akiyo Noguchi; 2t2 4b4	(France) Mélissa Le Nevé; 2t3 3b5	(United States) Alex Puccio; 2t7 4b11
9	(France) Chamonix; 12–13 July 2011	L	M	(Austria) Jakob Schubert; Top	(Spain) Ramón Julián Puigblanqué; 46+	(Norway) Magnus Midtboe; 42-
9	(France) Chamonix; 12–13 July 2011	L	W	(France) Caroline Ciavaldini (Austria) Angela Eiter (South Korea) Jain Kim (Slovenia) Mina Markovič; Top	–	–
9	(France) Chamonix; 12–13 July 2011	S	M	(Russia) Sergey Abdrakhmanov; 6.370	(Czech Republic) Libor Hroza; 7.740	(China) QiXin Zhong; 7.450
9	(France) Chamonix; 12–13 July 2011	S	W	(Poland) Edyta Ropek; 9.310	(Russia) Alina Gaidamakina; 9.450	(Russia) Mariia Krasavina; 9.670
10	(France) Briançon; 29–30 July 2011	L	M	(Austria) Jakob Schubert; 57-	(France) Manuel Romain; 53	(Spain) Ramón Julián Puigblanqué; 51
10	(France) Briançon; 29–30 July 2011	L	W	(Slovenia) Maja Vidmar; 51+	(Slovenia) Mina Markovič; 51+	(Austria) Angela Eiter; 48-
11	(Italy) Daone; 6–7 August 2011	S	M	(Russia) Stanislav Kokorin; 12.330 (quali)	(Poland) Lukasz Swirk; 13.090	(Russia) Sergey Abdrakhmanov; 13.940
11	(Italy) Daone; 6–7 August 2011	S	W	(Russia) Alina Gaidamakina; 21.130 (quali)	(Italy) Sara Morandi; 21.170	(Poland) Edyta Ropek; 22.980
12	(Germany) Munich; 19–20 August 2011	B	M	(Russia) Dmitrii Sharafutdinov; 4t4 4b4	(Russia) Rustam Gelmanov; 4t7 4b6	(Russia) Alexey Rubtsov; 2t4 4b6
12	(Germany) Munich; 19–20 August 2011	B	W	(Slovenia) Mina Markovič; 3t7 3b7	(Germany) Juliane Wurm; 2t4 3b3	(Austria) Anna Stöhr; 1t1 3b3
13	(China) Xining; 2–3 September 2011	L	M	(Austria) Jakob Schubert; Top	(Japan) Sachi Amma; Top	(France) Manuel Romain; Top
13	(China) Xining; 2–3 September 2011	L	W	(Slovenia) Mina Markovič; Top	(South Korea) Jain Kim; Top	(Austria) Katharina Posch; 43+
13	(China) Xining; 2–3 September 2011	S	M	(China) QiXin Zhong; 6.330	(Poland) Lukasz Swirk; 6.770	(Indonesia) Pandu Asmoro Galar; 7.730
13	(China) Xining; 2–3 September 2011	S	W	(Russia) Mariia Krasavina; 8.890	(Russia) Kseniia Alekseeva; 13.090	(Russia) Yuliya Levochkina; 9.420
14	(China) Changzhi; 7–8 September 2011	L	M	(Austria) Jakob Schubert; 33	(Spain) Ramón Julián Puigblanqué; 33-	(Japan) Sachi Amma; 24+
14	(China) Changzhi; 7–8 September 2011	L	W	(South Korea) Jain Kim (Slovenia) Mina Markovič; Top	–	(Slovenia) Maja Vidmar; Top
14	(China) Changzhi; 7–8 September 2011	S	M	(Russia) Evgenii Vaitsekhovskii; 7.610	(Indonesia) Pandu Asmoro Galar fall	(Russia) Sergey Abdrakhmanov; 6.720
14	(China) Changzhi; 7–8 September 2011	S	W	(Russia) Alina Gaidamakina; 10.050	(China) CuiLian He; 11.100	(Poland) Edyta Ropek; 9.420
15	(Belgium) Puurs; 30 September – 1 October 2011	L	M	(Austria) Jakob Schubert; 56-	(Japan) Sachi Amma; 54+	(Spain) Ramón Julián Puigblanqué; 52
15	(Belgium) Puurs; 30 September – 1 October 2011	L	W	(South Korea) Jain Kim; 51-	(Austria) Angela Eiter; 47	(Slovenia) Mina Markovič; 44-
16	(United States) Boulder; 8–9 October 2011	L	M	(Austria) Jakob Schubert; 38-	(Japan) Sachi Amma; 34-	(France) Romain Desgranges; 34-
16	(United States) Boulder; 8–9 October 2011	L	W	(Austria) Johanna Ernst; 48+	(Slovenia) Mina Markovič; 44-	(Japan) Momoka Oda; 42-
17	(Jordan) Amman; 20–21 October 2011	L	M	(Austria) Jakob Schubert; 48-	(Spain) Ramón Julián Puigblanqué; 47+	(France) Manuel Romain; 38-
17	(Jordan) Amman; 20–21 October 2011	L	W	(Slovenia) Mina Markovič; 49	(Slovenia) Maja Vidmar; 49-	(South Korea) Jain Kim (Japan) Momoka Oda; 48
18	(Slovenia) Kranj; 28–29 October 2011	L	M	(Spain) Ramón Julián Puigblanqué; 39-	(Canada) Sean McColl; 38-	(Japan) Sachi Amma; 32-
18	(Slovenia) Kranj; 28–29 October 2011	L	W	(Austria) Johanna Ernst; 33-	(Austria) Katharina Posch; 31-	(Russia) Yana Chereshneva; 17-
19	(Slovenia) Kranj; 19–20 November 2011	L	M	(Canada) Sean McColl; 35+	(Japan) Sachi Amma; 35	(Austria) Jakob Schubert; 32-
19	(Slovenia) Kranj; 19–20 November 2011	L	W	(South Korea) Jain Kim; 47-	(Slovenia) Mina Markovič; 44-	(Austria) Katharina Posch; 31.5+
20	(Spain) Barcelona; 26–27 November 2011	L	M	(Spain) Ramón Julián Puigblanqué; 52	(Austria) Jakob Schubert; 52-	(Japan) Sachi Amma; 50-
20	(Spain) Barcelona; 26–27 November 2011	L	W	(Austria) Angela Eiter (South Korea) Jain Kim (Slovenia) Mina Markovič; Top	–	–
OVERALL		B	M	(Austria) Kilian Fischhuber; 600.00	(Russia) Dmitrii Sharafutdinov; 531.00	(France) Guillaume Glairon Mondet; 423.00
OVERALL		B	W	(Austria) Anna Stöhr; 652.00	(Japan) Akiyo Noguchi; 633.00	(United States) Alex Puccio; 502.00
OVERALL		L	M	(Austria) Jakob Schubert; 845.00	(Spain) Ramón Julián Puigblanqué; 661.00	(Japan) Sachi Amma; 625.00
OVERALL		L	W	(Slovenia) Mina Markovič; 751.00	(South Korea) Jain Kim; 681.00	(Slovenia) Maja Vidmar; 535.00
OVERALL		S	M	(Poland) Lukasz Swirk; 317.00	(Russia) Sergei Sinitcyn; 312.00	(Russia) Sergey Abdrakhmanov; 298.00
OVERALL		S	W	(Poland) Edyta Ropek; 342.00	(Russia) Mariia Krasavina; 328.00	(Russia) Alina Gaidamakina; 323.00
OVERALL		C	M	(Austria) Jakob Schubert; 617.00	(Canada) Sean McColl; 496.00	(Slovenia) Klemen Becan; 445.00
OVERALL		C	W	(Slovenia) Mina Markovič; 751.00	(South Korea) Jain Kim; 726.00	(Japan) Akiyo Noguchi; 578.00
NATIONAL TEAMS		B	A	France; 1999	Austria; 1874	(Russia) Russian Federation; 1489
NATIONAL TEAMS		L	A	Austria; 2623	France; 2062	Slovenia; 1761
NATIONAL TEAMS		S	A	(Russia) Russian Federation; 2087	Poland; 1135	People's Republic of China; 585
