= Alex Puccio =

American rock climber

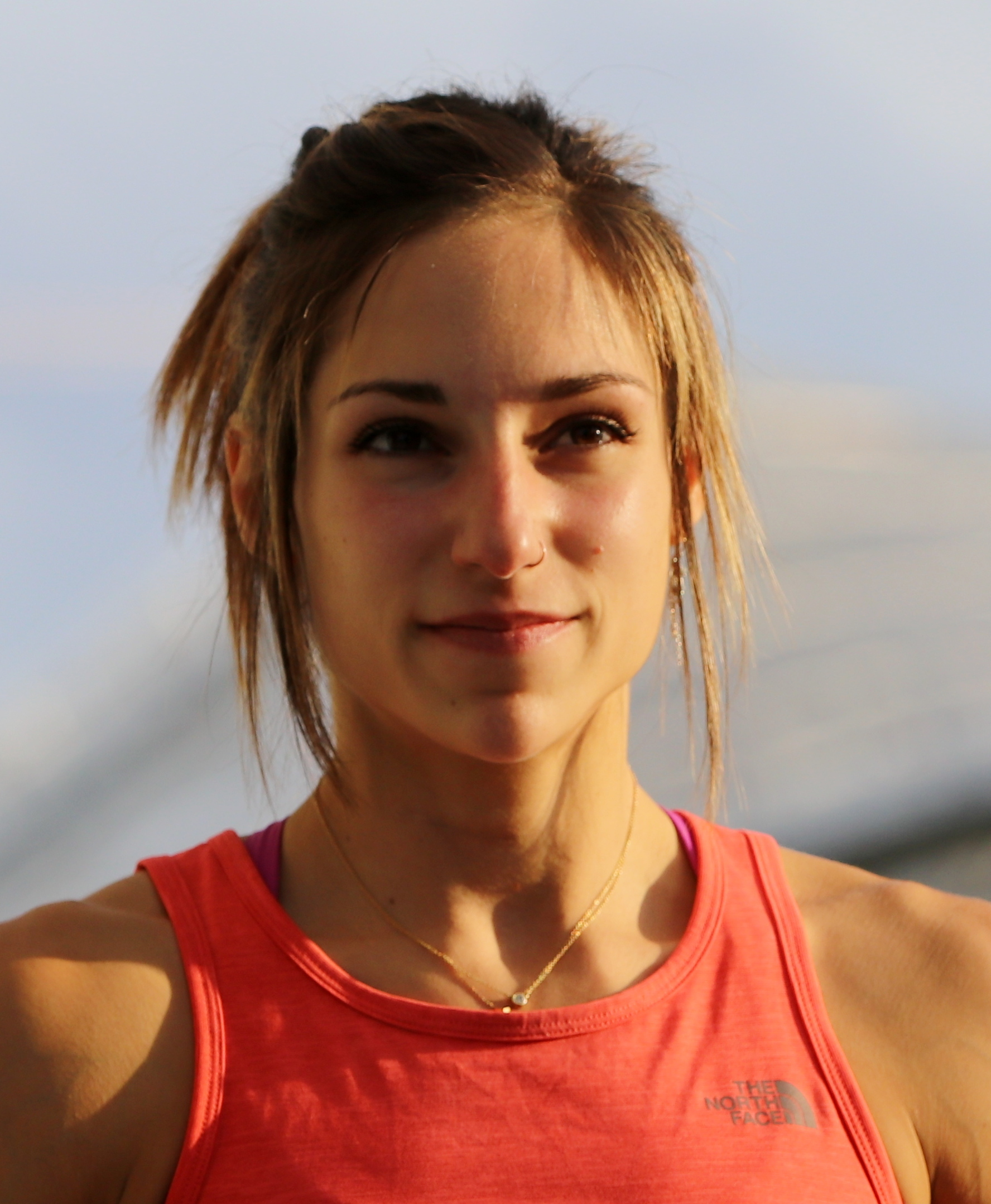
- Alex Puccio at the Boulder Worldcup Finals 2017 in Munich, Germany

Personal information
- Nationality: American
- Born: June 15, 1989 (age 37) McKinney, Texas
- Height: 5 ft 2 in (157 cm) (2013)
- Weight: 117 lb (53 kg) (2015)

Climbing career
- Type of climber: Competition climbing; Bouldering
- Highest grade: Bouldering: V14 (8B+)
Medal record
Women's sport climbing
Representing the United States
World Championships
Silver medal – second place	2014 Munich	Bouldering
World Cup
Gold medal – first place	2009 Vail	Bouldering
Gold medal – first place	2018 Vail	Bouldering
Silver medal – second place	2011 Vienna	Bouldering
Silver medal – second place	2011 Vail	Bouldering
Silver medal – second place	2011 Barcelona	Bouldering
Silver medal – second place	2013 Munich	Bouldering
Bronze medal – third place	2011 Log-Dragomer	Bouldering
Bronze medal – third place	2011 Sheffield	Bouldering
Bronze medal – third place	2012 Vienna	Bouldering
Bronze medal – third place	2013 Chongqing	Bouldering
Bronze medal – third place	2013 Kitzbühel	Bouldering
Bronze medal – third place	2013 Toronto	Bouldering
Bronze medal – third place	2013 Vail	Bouldering
Bronze medal – third place	2014 Toronto	Bouldering
Rock Master
Gold medal – first place	2012	Bouldering
Gold medal – first place	2013	Bouldering
Gold medal – first place	2014	Bouldering
- Updated on 18 March 2013

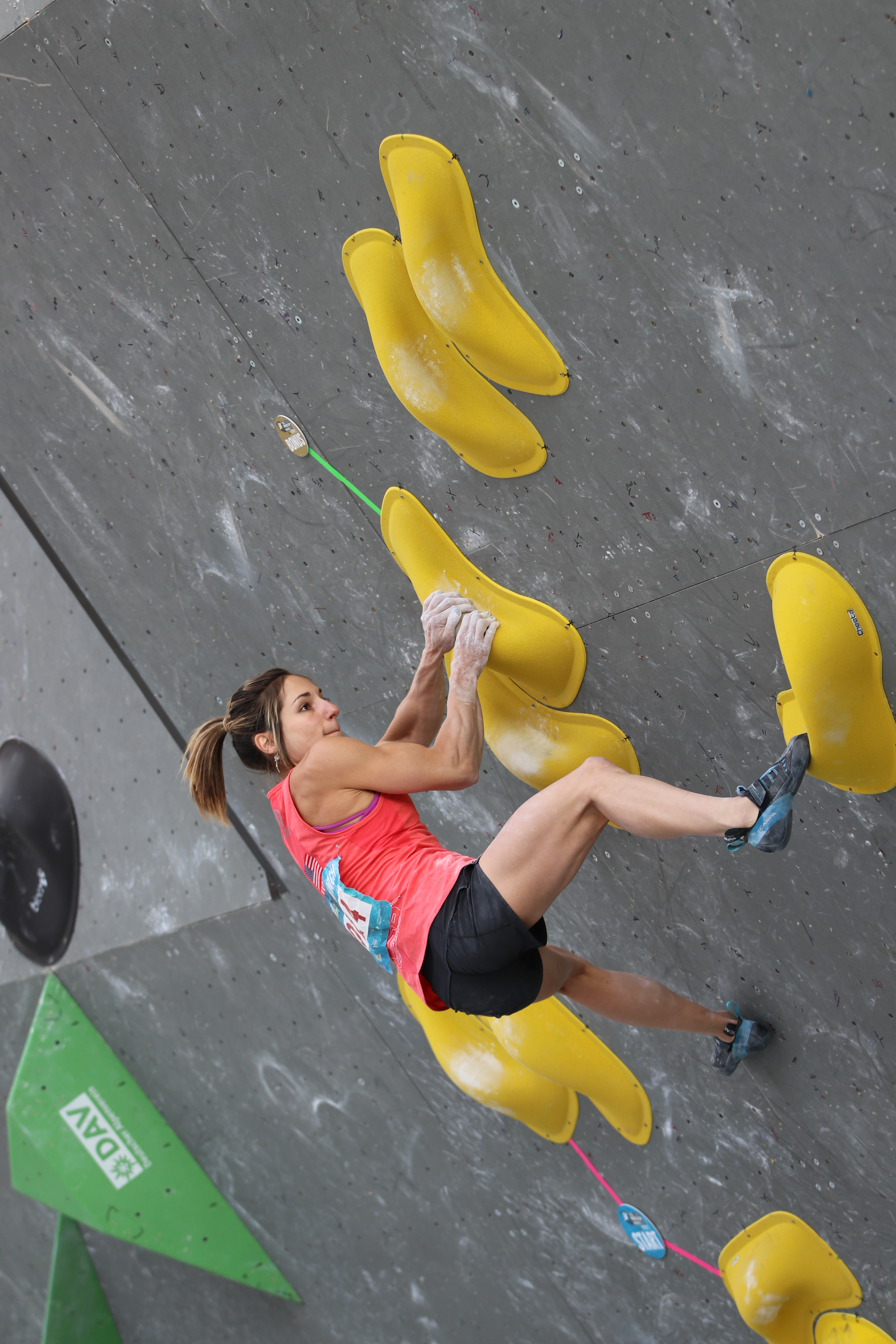
Alex Puccio climbing at the Boulder Worldcup 2017

Alex Puccio (born Alexandrea Elizabeth Cocca on June 15, 1989 in McKinney, Texas) is an American professional climber specializing in bouldering. She competes in climbing competitions and split her time between climbing outdoor and indoor. She finished third overall in the 2011 and 2013 World Cup bouldering competition, second overall in the 2014 Climbing World Championship bouldering competition, and has won the American Bouldering Series eleven times.

== Biography ==
Puccio started climbing in 2002 at age thirteen with her mother. In 2006, she participated for the first time in the U.S. Bouldering Championships, and won the title. She later won in 2007, 2008, 2010, 2011, 2012, and 2013. In 2008, 2009 and 2010 she competed in the World Cup bouldering climbing but only at the stage of Vail finishing sixth respectively, before and fourth. In 2011, she took part in all the steps going up to the podium five times, with three second places and two third places. Since then she has been a fixture on the IFSC Bouldering World Cup circuit where she is constantly a finalist.

She has ascended over two dozen boulders graded V12 (8A+) between the United States and Europe. On July 2, 2014, Puccio ascended Top Notch in Rocky Mountain National Park, her first V13 (8B) graded boulder. A month later, she ascended Jade becoming the fourth-ever woman to climb V14.

She placed second in the Boulder World Championship in Munich, Germany on 23 August 2014.

On June 5, 2015, she sustained a season-ending knee injury while warming up her dynos during the IFSC World Cup competition in Vail, Colorado. She required surgery to repair the torn ACL, MCL, and meniscus ligaments in her left knee which could have resulted in months of inactivity during the recovery. Despite a six-month inactivity prediction she was back climbing V13 (8B) by October 2015 with an ascent of Free Range in Boulder Canyon, Colorado.

In February 2016, she won the Hueco Tanks 'Rock Rodeo' amid world class competitors proving that she was still in top form. Puccio also had the most productive week-long bouldering trip by any female in history by completing three V13 (8B) boulders among many other double-digit (V-scale) boulders.

On June 19, 2016, Puccio underwent a spinal fusion surgery after doctors discovered a herniated disk between the C5 and C6 vertebrae. She first noticed the serious nature of the injury during the finals of the 2016 bouldering World Cup in Vail, CO when she felt shooting pain and weakness in her arms. Despite the pain she still climbed in the finals.

On December 19, 2016, she climbed the iconic razor blade climb Terre De Sienne V13 (8B) at Hueco Tanks. This achievement marked her 15th climb of that difficulty, performed just six months after a serious injury.

== Competition ==
Puccio is America's most accomplished female bouldering competitor. She has won the ABS National Championship eleven times and has been the top American female bouldering competitor at the IFSC world competitions. She has earned numerous medals in the bouldering World Cup events including gold medals at the 2009 Vail World Cup and the 2018 Vail World Cup. In 2014, she earned a gold medal at the Arco Rockmaster event and a silver medal in the World Championships for bouldering.

=== Rankings in the World Cup ===
Discipline	2011	2013	2014
Bouldering	3	3	6

=== Number of medals in the World Cup ===
Season	Gold	Silver	Bronze	Total
2009	1	0	0	1
2011	0	3	2	5
2012	0	0	1	1
2013	0	1	4	5
2014	0	0	1	1
2018	1	0	0	1
Total	2	4	8	14

== Notable ascents ==
- 8B+ (V14)
  - Heritage - Val Bavona (Switzerland) - 23 April 2019
  - Penrose Step - Leavenworth (USA) - 3 April 2018
  - New Base Line - Magic Wood (Switzerland), Switzerland - September 2017
  - The Wheel of Chaos - Rocky Mountain National Park (USA) - 20 September 2014 - First female ascent
  - Jade - Rocky Mountain National Park (USA) - 3 August 2014 - First female ascent
- 8B (V13)
  - Dead Meadow - Wild Basin (USA) - 2 June 2017
  - The Tea Cup - Leavenworth (USA) - 16 April 2017
  - Luther - Hueco (USA) - 22 February 2017 - This is the low start to Chablanke (V11)
  - Terre De Sienne - Hueco (USA) - 19 December 2016
  - Nagual - Hueco (USA) - 21 February 2016 - FFA
  - Slashface - Hueco (USA) - 20 February 2016 - FFA of this historic Fred Nicole climb that was once considered the most difficult boulder problem in the world and originally graded V14(8B+).
  - Crown of Aragorn - Hueco (USA) - 18 February 2016
  - Dark Waters - Rocky Mountain National Park (USA) - 9 November 2015
  - Free Range (a.k.a. cage free assis) - Boulder Canyon (USA) - 21 October 2015
  - Don't get too greedy - Rocky Mountain National Park (USA) - 14 October 2015
  - Irreversible - Rocky Mountain National Park (USA) - 26 September 2015
  - Direction - Bishop (USA) - 4 March 2015
  - The Swarm - Bishop (USA) - 23 November 2014 - Some say it may be 8B+(V14)
  - Black Lung - Joe's Valley (USA) - 25 November 2014 - First female ascent
  - Freaks of the Industry - Rocky Mountain National Park (USA) - 7 September 2014
  - The Automator - Rocky Mountain National Park (USA) - 18 August 2014
  - Nuthin But Sunshine - Rocky Mountain National Park (USA) - 7 July 2014
  - Top Notch - Rocky Mountain National Park (USA) - 2 July 2014 - First female ascent

== See also ==
- List of grade milestones in rock climbing
- History of rock climbing
- Rankings of most career IFSC gold medals
- Angie Payne, American bouldering climber
