= 2012 IFSC Climbing World Cup =

International sport climbing competition

- Location: Chongqing, China Log-Dragomer, Slovenia; Vienna, Austria; Innsbruck, Austria; Vail, United States; Chamonix, France; Briançon, France; Val Daone, Italy; Imst, Austria; Munich, Germany; Arco, Italy; Puurs, Belgium; Atlanta, United States; Xining, China; Mokpo, South Korea; Inzai, Japan Kranj, Slovenia
- Date: 13 April – 18 November 2012

Champions
- Men: (B) (Russia) Rustam Gelmanov (L) (Japan) Sachi Amma (S) (Russia) Stanislav Kokorin (C) (Austria) Jakob Schubert
- Women: (B) (Austria) Anna Stöhr (L) (Slovenia) Mina Markovič (S) (Russia) Alina Gaidamakina (C) (Slovenia) Mina Markovič

The 2012 IFSC Climbing World Cup was held in 17 locations. Bouldering competitions were held in 6 locations, lead in 9 locations, and speed in 6 locations. The season began on 13 April in Chongqing, China and concluded on 18 November in Kranj, Slovenia.

The top 3 in each competition received medals, and the overall winners were awarded trophies. At the end of the season, an overall ranking was determined based on points, which athletes were awarded for finishing in the top 30 of each event.

The winners for bouldering were Rustam Gelmanov and Anna Stöhr, for lead Sachi Amma and Mina Markovič, for speed Stanislav Kokorin and Alina Gaidamakina, and for combined Jakob Schubert and Mina Markovič, men and women respectively.

== Highlights of the season ==
In bouldering, at the World Cup in Munich, Akiyo Noguchi of Japan flashed all boulders in the final round to take the win.

In speed climbing, at the World Cup in Xining, Evgenii Vaitcekhovskii of Russia set a new world record of 5.88 seconds in the semifinal against his teammate Sergey Abdrakhmanov's 5.98 seconds. At the end of the season, Russian athletes, Stanislav Kokorin and Alina Gaidamakina clinched the overall titles of the season for men and women respectively, making it double speed titles for Russia.

== Overview ==
No.	Location	D	G	Gold	Silver	Bronze
1	(China) Chongqing; 13–14 April 2012	B	M	(Austria) Jakob Schubert; 2t2 3b6	(France) Guillaume Glairon Mondet; 2t5 4b4	(Russia) Rustam Gelmanov; 1t3 4b4
1	(China) Chongqing; 13–14 April 2012	B	W	(Japan) Akiyo Noguchi; 2t2 2b2	(Austria) Anna Stöhr; 2t6 3b5	(South Korea) Jain Kim; 1t2 3b4
1	(China) Chongqing; 13–14 April 2012	S	M	(Russia) Dmitrii Timofeev; 6.470	(Czech Republic) Libor Hroza; 7.280	(China) QiXin Zhong; 6.860
1	(China) Chongqing; 13–14 April 2012	S	W	(Russia) Alina Gaidamakina; 9.240	(Russia) Mariia Krasavina; 9.440	(Russia) Natalia Titova; 9.470
2	(Slovenia) Log-Dragomer; 21–22 April 2012	B	M	(Russia) Rustam Gelmanov; 3t4 4b5	(Austria) Kilian Fischhuber; 3t6 4b7	(Germany) Thomas Tauporn; 3t9 4b7
2	(Slovenia) Log-Dragomer; 21–22 April 2012	B	W	(Slovenia) Mina Markovič; 4t8 4b7	(United Kingdom) Shauna Coxsey; 2t2 4b4	(Austria) Anna Stöhr; 2t3 4b4
3	(Austria) Vienna; 27–28 April 2012	B	M	(Russia) Rustam Gelmanov; 4t7 4b4	(Russia) Dmitrii Sharafutdinov; 3t4 4b4	(Austria) Kilian Fischhuber; 3t5 4b4
3	(Austria) Vienna; 27–28 April 2012	B	W	(Japan) Akiyo Noguchi; 4t6 4b4	(Slovenia) Mina Markovič; 3t5 4b4	(United States) Alex Puccio; 2t2 3b4
4	(Austria) Innsbruck; 18–19 May 2012	B	M	(Austria) Kilian Fischhuber; 2t5 4b8	(Russia) Rustam Gelmanov; 1t1 3b4	(Canada) Sean McColl; 0t 4b4
4	(Austria) Innsbruck; 18–19 May 2012	B	W	(Austria) Anna Stöhr; 4t7 4b6	(United Kingdom) Shauna Coxsey; 4t8 4b7	(France) Mélissa Le Nevé; 3t4 3b4
5	(United States) Vail; 1–2 June 2012	B	M	(Austria) Kilian Fischhuber; 4t7 4b7	(Canada) Sean McColl; 4t9 4b9	(Germany) Jan Hojer; 3t3 3b3
5	(United States) Vail; 1–2 June 2012	B	W	(Austria) Anna Stöhr; 4t14 4b11	(United Kingdom) Shauna Coxsey; 3t4 4b5	(Germany) Juliane Wurm; 3t4 3b3
6	(France) Chamonix; 12–13 July 2012	L	M	(Japan) Sachi Amma; 43+	(Spain) Ramón Julián Puigblanqué; 41+	(Canada) Sean McColl; 40+
6	(France) Chamonix; 12–13 July 2012	L	W	(Slovenia) Mina Markovič; 42+	(South Korea) Jain Kim; 42+	(Japan) Momoka Oda; 41
6	(France) Chamonix; 12–13 July 2012	S	M	(Russia) Stanislav Kokorin; 6.401	(Ukraine) Danyil Boldyrev; 9.043	(Ukraine) Yaroslav Gontaryk; 6.397
6	(France) Chamonix; 12–13 July 2012	S	W	(Poland) Aleksandra Rudzinska; 8.998	(Russia) Alina Gaidamakina; 9.193	(Russia) Natalia Titova; 9.402
7	(France) Briançon; 20–21 July 2012	L	M	(Japan) Sachi Amma; 53+	(Canada) Sean McColl; 50+	(Austria) Jakob Schubert; 49
7	(France) Briançon; 20–21 July 2012	L	W	(France) Hélène Janicot; Top	(Austria) Johanna Ernst; Top	(France) Charlotte Durif; Top
8	(Italy) Val Daone; 28–29 July 2012	S	M	(Ukraine) Yaroslav Gontaryk; 12.980	(Russia) Evgenii Vaitsekhovskii fall	(Russia) Sergei Sinitcyn; 16.160
8	(Italy) Val Daone; 28–29 July 2012	S	W	(Poland) Edyta Ropek; 20.910	(Poland) Klaudia Buczek; 21.330	(Russia) Alina Gaidamakina; 18.300
9	(Austria) Imst; 10–11 August 2012	L	M	(Netherlands) Jorg Verhoeven; 47+	(Austria) Jakob Schubert; 46+	(Japan) Sachi Amma; 46+
9	(Austria) Imst; 10–11 August 2012	L	W	(Japan) Momoka Oda; 60+	(Slovenia) Mina Markovič; 57+	(Austria) Johanna Ernst; 51+
10	(Germany) Munich; 25–26 August 2012	B	M	(Russia) Dmitrii Sharafutdinov; 4t10 4b9	(Canada) Sean McColl; 4t10 4b10	(Austria) Jakob Schubert; 3t10 4b17
10	(Germany) Munich; 25–26 August 2012	B	W	(Japan) Akiyo Noguchi; 4t4 4b4	(Austria) Anna Stöhr; 4t5 4b5	(Germany) Juliane Wurm; 4t6 4b5
11	(Italy) Arco; 1–2 September 2012	S	M	(Italy) Leonardo Gontero; 6.600	(Russia) Sergei Sinitcyn; 6.740	(Czech Republic) Libor Hroza; 6.500
11	(Italy) Arco; 1–2 September 2012	S	W	(Russia) Alina Gaidamakina; 9.040	(Russia) Yuliya Levochkina; 9.700	(Russia) Natalia Titova; 8.960
12	(Belgium) Puurs; 21–22 September 2012	L	M	(Spain) Ramón Julián Puigblanqué; 60+	(Switzerland) Cédric Lachat; 57+	(France) Romain Desgranges; 57+
12	(Belgium) Puurs; 21–22 September 2012	L	W	(South Korea) Jain Kim; 56	(Austria) Johanna Ernst; 54+	(Austria) Magdalena Röck; 51+
13	(United States) Atlanta; 29–30 September 2012	L	M	(Spain) Ramón Julián Puigblanqué; Top	(Austria) Jakob Schubert; Top	(France) Romain Desgranges; 70+
13	(United States) Atlanta; 29–30 September 2012	L	W	(South Korea) Jain Kim; 59+	(Slovenia) Mina Markovič; 59+	(Slovenia) Maja Vidmar; 54
14	(China) Xining; 12–13 October 2012	L	M	(Canada) Sean McColl; 38+	(Netherlands) Jorg Verhoeven; 33	(Italy) Stefano Ghisolfi; 32
14	(China) Xining; 12–13 October 2012	L	W	(Austria) Johanna Ernst; Top	(Slovenia) Mina Markovič; Top	(South Korea) Jain Kim; 42+
14	(China) Xining; 12–13 October 2012	S	M	(Russia) Stanislav Kokorin; 6.080	(Russia) Evgenii Vaitsekhovskii; 6.290	(Russia) Sergey Abdrakhmanov; 6.110
14	(China) Xining; 12–13 October 2012	S	W	(France) Esther Bruckner; 8.540	(Poland) Edyta Ropek; 9.190	(Russia) Mariia Krasavina; 8.580
15	(South Korea) Mokpo; 20–21 October 2012	L	M	(South Korea) Hyunbin Min; 33	(Japan) Sachi Amma; 32+	(Canada) Sean McColl; 29+
15	(South Korea) Mokpo; 20–21 October 2012	L	W	(South Korea) Jain Kim; 36+	(Slovenia) Mina Markovič; 36+	(Russia) Dinara Fakhritdinova; 35+
15	(South Korea) Mokpo; 20–21 October 2012	S	M	(Ukraine) Danyil Boldyrev; 6.110	(Russia) Arsenii Shevchenko; 6.590	(Ukraine) Yaroslav Gontaryk; 6.200
15	(South Korea) Mokpo; 20–21 October 2012	S	W	(Russia) Yuliya Levochkina; 9.340	(Russia) Mariia Krasavina; 9.400	(France) Esther Bruckner; 9.350
16	(Japan) Inzai; 27–28 October 2012	L	M	(Spain) Ramón Julián Puigblanqué; Top	(Austria) Jakob Schubert; Top	(Japan) Sachi Amma; Top
16	(Japan) Inzai; 27–28 October 2012	L	W	(Slovenia) Mina Markovič; Top	(South Korea) Jain Kim; 51+	(Slovenia) Maja Vidmar; 49+
17	(Slovenia) Kranj; 17–18 November 2012	L	M	(Austria) Jakob Schubert; 43+	(Japan) Sachi Amma; 34	(Norway) Magnus Midtboe; 33+
17	(Slovenia) Kranj; 17–18 November 2012	L	W	(Slovenia) Mina Markovič; 37+	(Japan) Momoka Oda; 37+	(Slovenia) Maja Vidmar; 37+
OVERALL		B	M	(Russia) Rustam Gelmanov; 400.00	(Austria) Kilian Fischhuber; 354.00	(Austria) Jakob Schubert; 318.00
OVERALL		B	W	(Austria) Anna Stöhr; 425.00	(Japan) Akiyo Noguchi; 394.00	(United Kingdom) Shauna Coxsey; 350.00
OVERALL		L	M	(Japan) Sachi Amma; 600.00	(Spain) Ramón Julián Puigblanqué; 568.00	(Austria) Jakob Schubert; 538.00
OVERALL		L	W	(Slovenia) Mina Markovič; 675.00	(South Korea) Jain Kim; 617.00	(Austria) Johanna Ernst; 522.00
OVERALL		S	M	(Russia) Stanislav Kokorin; 361.00	(Ukraine) Danyil Boldyrev; 314.00	(Ukraine) Yaroslav Gontaryk; 301.00
OVERALL		S	W	(Russia) Alina Gaidamakina; 396.00	(Russia) Yuliya Levochkina; 345.00	(Russia) Mariia Krasavina; 319.00
OVERALL		C	M	(Austria) Jakob Schubert; 737.00	(Canada) Sean McColl; 681.00	(Japan) Sachi Amma; 499.00
OVERALL		C	W	(Slovenia) Mina Markovič; 764.00	(South Korea) Jain Kim; 631.00	(Japan) Akiyo Noguchi; 590.00
