= 2013 IFSC Climbing World Cup =

2013 edition of the Climbing World Cup series

- Location: Chongqing, China Millau, France; Kitzbühel, Austria; Log-Dragomer, Slovenia; Innsbruck, Austria; Toronto, Canada; Vail, United States; Baku, Azerbaijan; Briançon, France; Imst, Austria; Munich, Germany; Arco, Italy; Puurs, Belgium; Perm, Russia; Mokpo, South Korea; Haiyang, China; Wujiang, China; Valence, France Kranj, Slovenia
- Date: 22 March – 17 November 2013

Champions
- Men: (B) (Russia) Dmitrii Sharafutdinov (L) (Japan) Sachi Amma (S) (Russia) Stanislav Kokorin (C) (Austria) Jakob Schubert
- Women: (B) (Austria) Anna Stöhr (L) (South Korea) Jain Kim (S) (Russia) Alina Gaidamakina (C) (Slovenia) Mina Markovič

The 2013 IFSC Climbing World Cup was held in 19 locations. Bouldering competitions were held in 8 locations, lead in 8 locations, and speed in 7 locations. The season began on 22 March in Chongqing, China and concluded on 17 November in Kranj, Slovenia.

The top 3 in each competition received medals, and the overall winners were awarded trophies. At the end of the season an overall ranking was determined based upon points, which athletes were awarded for finishing in the top 30 of each individual event.

The winners for bouldering were Dmitrii Sharafutdinov and Anna Stöhr, for lead Sachi Amma and Jain Kim, for speed Stanislav Kokorin and Alina Gaidamakina, and for combined Jakob Schubert and Mina Markovič, men and women respectively. The National Team for bouldering was Austria, for lead Japan, and for speed Russian Federation.

== Highlights of the season ==
In bouldering, at the World Cup in Kitzbühel, Anna Stöhr of Austria flashed all boulders in the final round to take the win.

In speed climbing, at the World Cup in Wujiang, Iuliia Kaplina of Russia set a new world record of 7.85s in the final round against her teammate Mariia Krasavina. Then at the end of the season, Russian athletes, Stanislav Kokorin and Alina Gaidamakina clinched the overall titles of the season for men and women respectively, making it double speed titles for Russia.

== Overview ==
No.	Location	D	G	Gold	Silver	Bronze
1	(China) Chongqing; 22–23 March 2013	B	M	(Russia) Dmitrii Sharafutdinov; 4t9 4b9	(Austria) Jakob Schubert; 3t5 3b5	(Japan) Tsukuru Hori; 3t6 3b6
1	(China) Chongqing; 22–23 March 2013	B	W	(Austria) Anna Stöhr; 3t5 4b6	(Japan) Momoka Oda; 2t3 3b3	(United States) Alex Puccio; 2t3 3b4
1	(China) Chongqing; 22–23 March 2013	S	M	(Russia) Stanislav Kokorin; 10.000	(Czech Republic) Libor Hroza fall	(China) QiXin Zhong; 6.220
1	(China) Chongqing; 22–23 March 2013	S	W	(Poland) Aleksandra Rudzinska; 8.430	(Russia) Yuliya Levochkina; 9.930	(Russia) Iuliia Kaplina; 8.440
2	(France) Millau; 5–6 April 2013	B	M	(Austria) Kilian Fischhuber; 3t9 3b5	(France) Guillaume Glairon Mondet; 1t1 4b10	(Netherlands) Jorg Verhoeven; 1t1 3b4
2	(France) Millau; 5–6 April 2013	B	W	(Austria) Anna Stöhr; 4t13 4b13	(United Kingdom) Shauna Coxsey; 4t14 4b13	(Japan) Akiyo Noguchi; 3t7 4b9
3	(Austria) Kitzbühel; 26–27 April 2013	B	M	(Austria) Jakob Schubert; 2t7 4b9	(France) Guillaume Glairon Mondet; 1t2 2b2	(Russia) Dmitrii Sharafutdinov; 1t3 3b3
3	(Austria) Kitzbühel; 26–27 April 2013	B	W	(Austria) Anna Stöhr; 4t4 4b4	(Japan) Akiyo Noguchi; 4t4 4b4	(United States) Alex Puccio; 4t6 4b6
4	(Slovenia) Log-Dragomer; 11–12 May 2013	B	M	(Canada) Sean McColl; 3t5 4b9	(Germany) Jan Hojer; 2t8 3b9	(Russia) Dmitrii Sharafutdinov; 2t10 3b8
4	(Slovenia) Log-Dragomer; 11–12 May 2013	B	W	(Austria) Anna Stöhr; 3t6 4b5	(France) Mélissa Le Nevé; 3t6 4b7	(United Kingdom) Shauna Coxsey; 2t3 4b4
5	(Austria) Innsbruck; 17–18 May 2013	B	M	(Germany) Jan Hojer; 4t6 4b6	(Russia) Dmitrii Sharafutdinov; 4t7 4b7	(Austria) Kilian Fischhuber; 3t3 3b3
5	(Austria) Innsbruck; 17–18 May 2013	B	W	(Germany) Juliane Wurm; 4t5 4b4	(Austria) Anna Stöhr; 4t6 4b5	(Japan) Akiyo Noguchi; 3t9 4b10
6	(Canada) Toronto; 1–2 June 2013	B	M	(Austria) Kilian Fischhuber; 3t5 4b5	(Netherlands) Jorg Verhoeven; 3t5 3b5	(Austria) Jakob Schubert; 2t2 3b4
6	(Canada) Toronto; 1–2 June 2013	B	W	(Austria) Anna Stöhr; 4t10 4b10	(Japan) Akiyo Noguchi; 3t4 4b5	(United States) Alex Puccio; 3t5 4b4
7	(United States) Vail; 7–8 June 2013	B	M	(Russia) Dmitrii Sharafutdinov; 3t5 4b6	(Russia) Rustam Gelmanov; 3t7 4b5	(Netherlands) Jorg Verhoeven; 1t1 3b3
7	(United States) Vail; 7–8 June 2013	B	W	(Austria) Anna Stöhr; 4t9 4b7	(Japan) Akiyo Noguchi; 4t9 4b9	(United States) Alex Puccio; 4t9 4b9
8	(Azerbaijan) Baku; 22–23 June 2013	S	M	(Russia) Stanislav Kokorin; 6.280	(Ukraine) Yaroslav Gontaryk; 6.750	(Italy) Leonardo Gontero; 6.660
8	(Azerbaijan) Baku; 22–23 June 2013	S	W	(Russia) Iuliia Kaplina; 8.080	(Russia) Alina Gaidamakina; 8.270	(Poland) Aleksandra Rudzinska; 8.640
9	(France) Briançon; 19–20 July 2013	L	M	(Spain) Ramón Julián Puigblanqué; 47+	(Japan) Sachi Amma; 46+	(Switzerland) Cédric Lachat; 39+
9	(France) Briançon; 19–20 July 2013	L	W	(South Korea) Jain Kim; Top	(Slovenia) Mina Markovič; 52	(France) Hélène Janicot; 50+
10	(Austria) Imst; 9–10 August 2013	L	M	(Czech Republic) Adam Ondra; 54+	(Austria) Jakob Schubert; 54+	(Spain) Ramón Julián Puigblanqué; 52+
10	(Austria) Imst; 9–10 August 2013	L	W	(Slovenia) Mina Markovič; 60+	(Japan) Momoka Oda; 60+	(South Korea) Jain Kim; 57.5
11	(Germany) Munich; 24–25 August 2013	B	M	(Japan) Rei Sugimoto; 3t11 3b8	(Germany) Thomas Tauporn; 2t4 2b4	(Russia) Rustam Gelmanov; 2t5 3b6
11	(Germany) Munich; 24–25 August 2013	B	W	(Austria) Anna Stöhr; 4t9 4b7	(United States) Alex Puccio; 3t5 4b5	(United Kingdom) Shauna Coxsey; 2t5 3b6
12	(Italy) Arco; 7 September 2013	S	M	(Czech Republic) Libor Hroza; 5.990	(China) QiXin Zhong; 6.270	(Russia) Stanislav Kokorin; 6.240
12	(Italy) Arco; 7 September 2013	S	W	(Russia) Alina Gaidamakina; 8.780	(Russia) Mariia Krasavina fall	(Russia) Kseniya Polekhina; 8.610
13	(Belgium) Puurs; 20–21 September 2013	L	M	(Austria) Jakob Schubert; 44	(Japan) Sachi Amma; 39+	(Canada) Sean McColl; 39+
13	(Belgium) Puurs; 20–21 September 2013	L	W	(South Korea) Jain Kim; Top	(Slovenia) Mina Markovič; 50	(Japan) Momoka Oda; 43+
14	(Russia) Perm; 27–29 September 2013	L	M	(Spain) Ramón Julián Puigblanqué; 45	(Austria) Jakob Schubert; 43+	(South Korea) Hyunbin Min; 37+
14	(Russia) Perm; 27–29 September 2013	L	W	(South Korea) Jain Kim; Top	(Austria) Magdalena Röck; 32+	(Japan) Momoka Oda; 32+
14	(Russia) Perm; 27–29 September 2013	S	M	(Russia) Arsenii Shevchenko; 7.650	(Czech Republic) Libor Hroza fall	(China) QiXin Zhong; 6.440
14	(Russia) Perm; 27–29 September 2013	S	W	(Russia) Alina Gaidamakina; 8.350	(Russia) Yuliya Levochkina; 8.780	(Russia) Mariia Krasavina; 8.380
15	(South Korea) Mokpo; 11–12 October 2013	L	M	(Japan) Sachi Amma; 46+	(South Korea) Hyunbin Min; 46+	(Canada) Sean McColl; 45+
15	(South Korea) Mokpo; 11–12 October 2013	L	W	(Slovenia) Mina Markovič; Top	(South Korea) Jain Kim; Top	(Japan) Momoka Oda; 59
15	(South Korea) Mokpo; 11–12 October 2013	S	M	(China) QiXin Zhong; 6.047	(Czech Republic) Libor Hroza; 6.281	(Russia) Stanislav Kokorin; 7.328
15	(South Korea) Mokpo; 11–12 October 2013	S	W	(Russia) Iuliia Kaplina; 9.310	(Russia) Alina Gaidamakina fall	(Russia) Yuliya Levochkina; 9.040
16	(China) Haiyang; 15–16 October 2013	S	M	(Iran) Reza Alipourshenazandifar; 6.240	(Russia) Stanislav Kokorin; 6.270	(Russia) Evgenii Vaitsekhovskii; 6.180
16	(China) Haiyang; 15–16 October 2013	S	W	(Russia) Alina Gaidamakina; 8.240	(Poland) Aleksandra Rudzinska; 8.540	(Russia) Mariia Krasavina; 8.320
17	(China) Wujiang; 19–20 October 2013	L	M	(Japan) Sachi Amma; 44+	(Canada) Sean McColl; 43+	(Austria) Jakob Schubert; 41+
17	(China) Wujiang; 19–20 October 2013	L	W	(Slovenia) Mina Markovič; 38+	(South Korea) Jain Kim; 38+	(Austria) Magdalena Röck; 34+
17	(China) Wujiang; 19–20 October 2013	S	M	(Russia) Stanislav Kokorin; 6.810	(Iran) Reza Alipourshenazandifar fall	(Ukraine) Yaroslav Gontaryk; 6.550
17	(China) Wujiang; 19–20 October 2013	S	W	(Russia) Iuliia Kaplina; 7.850	(Russia) Mariia Krasavina; 7.970	(Russia) Yuliya Levochkina; 10.540
18	(France) Valence; 1–2 November 2013	L	M	(Czech Republic) Adam Ondra; 39+	(Canada) Sean McColl; 34+	(France) Gautier Supper; 33+
18	(France) Valence; 1–2 November 2013	L	W	(South Korea) Jain Kim; 47+	(Slovenia) Mina Markovič; 45+	(Japan) Momoka Oda; 44
19	(Slovenia) Kranj; 16–17 November 2013	L	M	(Austria) Jakob Schubert; 41+	(Czech Republic) Adam Ondra; 40+	(Japan) Sachi Amma; 39
19	(Slovenia) Kranj; 16–17 November 2013	L	W	(Japan) Momoka Oda; 34+	(Japan) Akiyo Noguchi; 34	(Slovenia) Mina Markovič; 29+
OVERALL		B	M	(Russia) Dmitrii Sharafutdinov; 516.00	(Austria) Jakob Schubert; 394.00	(Canada) Sean McColl; 377.00
OVERALL		B	W	(Austria) Anna Stöhr; 700.00	(Japan) Akiyo Noguchi; 480.00	(United States) Alex Puccio; 438.00
OVERALL		L	M	(Japan) Sachi Amma; 572.00	(Austria) Jakob Schubert; 535.00	(Spain) Ramón Julián Puigblanqué; 420.00
OVERALL		L	W	(South Korea) Jain Kim; 625.00	(Slovenia) Mina Markovič; 605.00	(Japan) Momoka Oda; 491.00
OVERALL		S	M	(Russia) Stanislav Kokorin; 510.00	(Czech Republic) Libor Hroza; 405.00	(China) QiXin Zhong; 360.00
OVERALL		S	W	(Russia) Alina Gaidamakina; 515.00	(Russia) Iuliia Kaplina; 471.00	(Poland) Aleksandra Rudzinska; 402.00
OVERALL		C	M	(Austria) Jakob Schubert; 755.00	(Canada) Sean McColl; 651.00	(Japan) Sachi Amma; 507.00
OVERALL		C	W	(Slovenia) Mina Markovič; 648.00	(Japan) Akiyo Noguchi; 634.00	(Japan) Momoka Oda; 628.00
NATIONAL TEAMS		B	A	Austria; 1946	(Japan); 1523	(Russia) Russian Federation; 1309
NATIONAL TEAMS		L	A	(Japan); 1750	Austria; 1567	France; 1460
NATIONAL TEAMS		S	A	(Russia) Russian Federation; 2524	Poland; 1534	Ukraine; 946
