= 2014 IFSC Climbing World Cup =

International sport climbing competition

- Location: Chongqing, China Baku, Azerbaijan; Grindelwald, Switzerland; Innsbruck, Austria; Toronto, Canada; Vail, United States; Haiyang, China; Laval, France; Chamonix, France; Briançon, France; Imst, Austria; Arco, Italy; Mokpo, South Korea; Wujiang, China; Inzai, Japan Kranj, Slovenia
- Date: 26 April – 16 November 2014

Champions
- Men: (B) (Germany) Jan Hojer (L) (Austria) Jakob Schubert (S) (Ukraine) Danyil Boldyrev (C) (Canada) Sean McColl
- Women: (B) (Japan) Akiyo Noguchi (L) (South Korea) Jain Kim (S) (Russia) Mariia Krasavina (C) (Japan) Akiyo Noguchi

The 2014 IFSC Climbing World Cup was held in 16 locations. Bouldering competitions were held in 8 locations, lead in 8 locations, and speed in 7 locations. The season began on 26 April in Chongqing, China and concluded on 16 November in Kranj, Slovenia.

The top 3 in each competition received medals, and the overall winners were awarded trophies. At the end of the season an overall ranking was determined based upon points, which athletes were awarded for finishing in the top 30 of each individual event.

The winners for bouldering were Jan Hojer and Akiyo Noguchi, for lead Jakob Schubert and Jain Kim, for speed Danyil Boldyrev and Mariia Krasavina, and for combined Sean McColl and Akiyo Noguchi, men and women respectively. The National Team for bouldering was Japan, for lead Austria, and for speed Russian Federation.

== Highlights of the season ==
In bouldering, at the World Cup in Baku, Anna Stöhr of Austria flashed all boulders in the final round to take the win.

In speed climbing, at the World Cup in Arco, Libor Hroza of Czech Republic set new world records twice at 5.76 seconds in the qualification round and 5.73 seconds in the quarter-final against Ukraine's Danyil Boldyrev's 5.75 seconds. The previous world record was 5.88s, set by Evgenii Vaitcekhovskii of Russia at the 2012 Speed World Cup in Xining, China.

France was the only nation in the top three National Team Ranking in all disciplines.

== Overview ==
No.	Location	D	G	Gold		Silver		Bronze	
1	(China) Chongqing; 26–27 April	B	M	(Germany) Jan Hojer	4t26 4b24	(Russia) Dmitrii Sharafutdinov	3t5 3b5	(Netherlands) Jorg Verhoeven	2t9 2b9
1	(China) Chongqing; 26–27 April	B	W	(Germany) Juliane Wurm	3t6 3b6	(United Kingdom) Shauna Coxsey	3t7 4b10	(Japan) Akiyo Noguchi	3t12 4b13
1	(China) Chongqing; 26–27 April	S	M	(Russia) Stanislav Kokorin	6.760	(Ukraine) Danyil Boldyrev	9.150	(Czech Republic) Libor Hroza	6.250
1	(China) Chongqing; 26–27 April	S	W	(Russia) Iuliia Kaplina	8.020	(Russia) Mariia Krasavina	8.240	(France) Anouck Jaubert	8.470
2	(Azerbaijan) Baku; 3–4 May	B	M	(Russia) Dmitrii Sharafutdinov	3t3 4b4	(Germany) Jan Hojer	2t2 4b5	(Russia) Rustam Gelmanov	2t2 3b3
2	(Azerbaijan) Baku; 3–4 May	B	W	(Austria) Anna Stöhr	4t4 4b4	(Japan) Akiyo Noguchi	4t5 4b4	(United Kingdom) Shauna Coxsey	4t5 4b5
2	(Azerbaijan) Baku; 3–4 May	S	M	(Ukraine) Danyil Boldyrev	6.090	(Russia) Evgenii Vaitsekhovskii	7.300	(China) QiXin Zhong	6.390
2	(Azerbaijan) Baku; 3–4 May	S	W	(Russia) Mariia Krasavina	8.550	(Russia) Iuliia Kaplina	fall	(France) Anouck Jaubert	8.730
3	(Switzerland) Grindelwald; 10–11 May	B	M	(Germany) Jan Hojer	3t7 3b7	(Russia) Dmitrii Sharafutdinov	3t10 4b14	(Austria) Kilian Fischhuber	2t7 2b7
3	(Switzerland) Grindelwald; 10–11 May	B	W	(United Kingdom) Shauna Coxsey	4t10 4b10	(Austria) Anna Stöhr	4t12 4b8	(Germany) Juliane Wurm	3t11 3b7
4	(Austria) Innsbruck; 16–17 May	B	M	(Austria) Kilian Fischhuber	4t7 4b6	(Czech Republic) Adam Ondra	4t8 4b6	(Russia) Rustam Gelmanov	4t14 4b14
4	(Austria) Innsbruck; 16–17 May	B	W	(United Kingdom) Shauna Coxsey	3t11 3b10	(Austria) Anna Stöhr	2t6 3b5	(Japan) Akiyo Noguchi	1t1 2b4
5	(Canada) Toronto; 31 May – 1 June	B	M	(France) Guillaume Glairon Mondet	3t8 4b16	(Germany) Jan Hojer	3t9 4b8	(Canada) Sean McColl	2t2 4b9
5	(Canada) Toronto; 31 May – 1 June	B	W	(Japan) Akiyo Noguchi	4t5 4b5	(United Kingdom) Shauna Coxsey	4t7 4b7	(United States) Alex Puccio	4t11 4b11
6	(United States) Vail; 6–7 June	B	M	(Russia) Dmitrii Sharafutdinov	4t8 4b5	(France) Guillaume Glairon Mondet	3t6 4b6	(Canada) Sean McColl	3t12 4b10
6	(United States) Vail; 6–7 June	B	W	(Japan) Akiyo Noguchi	4t5 4b5	(France) Fanny Gibert	2t3 4b8	(Austria) Anna Stöhr	2t5 4b6
7	(China) Haiyang; 20–22 June	B	M	(Germany) Jan Hojer	3t7 4b8	(Canada) Sean McColl	2t5 3b6	(France) Guillaume Glairon Mondet	0t 2b4
7	(China) Haiyang; 20–22 June	B	W	(Japan) Akiyo Noguchi	2t2 4b6	(United Kingdom) Shauna Coxsey	2t5 3b5	(Austria) Anna Stöhr	1t3 2b6
7	(China) Haiyang; 20–22 June	L	M	(Austria) Jakob Schubert	32+	(Canada) Sean McColl	31+	(France) Gautier Supper	29
7	(China) Haiyang; 20–22 June	L	W	(South Korea) Jain Kim	46+	(Austria) Magdalena Röck	38+	(Belgium) Anak Verhoeven	37+
7	(China) Haiyang; 20–22 June	S	M	(China) QiXin Zhong	6.030	(Poland) Marcin Dzieński	6.450	(Ukraine) Danyil Boldyrev	6.110
7	(China) Haiyang; 20–22 June	S	W	(Russia) Mariia Krasavina	8.350	(Russia) Iuliia Kaplina	fall	(France) Anouck Jaubert	8.580
8	(France) Laval; 27–28 June	B	M	(Russia) Rustam Gelmanov	4t8 4b8	(France) Guillaume Glairon Mondet	3t6 3b5	(France) Jeremy Bonder	2t4 2b2
8	(France) Laval; 27–28 June	B	W	(Japan) Akiyo Noguchi	3t4 4b7	(Japan) Miho Nonaka	3t6 4b10	(Germany) Juliane Wurm	3t7 4b7
9	(France) Chamonix; 10–12 July	L	M	(Japan) Sachi Amma	28+	(Austria) Jakob Schubert	24+	(Slovenia) Domen Škofic	23+
9	(France) Chamonix; 10–12 July	L	W	(South Korea) Jain Kim	50+	(Austria) Magdalena Röck	45+	(Slovenia) Mina Markovič	44+
9	(France) Chamonix; 10–12 July	S	M	(Ukraine) Danyil Boldyrev	7.200	(Poland) Marcin Dzieński	fall	(Iran) Reza Alipour	6.010
9	(France) Chamonix; 10–12 July	S	W	(Russia) Alina Gaidamakina	8.300	(Poland) Aleksandra Rudzinska	fall	(Russia) Mariia Krasavina	7.700
10	(France) Briançon; 19–20 July	L	M	(Japan) Sachi Amma	46+ (sf)	(France) Romain Desgranges	43+	(Austria) Jakob Schubert	42+
10	(France) Briançon; 19–20 July	L	W	(South Korea) Jain Kim	50+ (sf)	(Austria) Magdalena Röck	43+	(Belgium) Anak Verhoeven	43+
11	(Austria) Imst; 1–2 August	L	M	(Czech Republic) Adam Ondra	41+	(Canada) Sean McColl	39+	(Austria) Jakob Schubert	39
11	(Austria) Imst; 1–2 August	L	W	(Austria) Magdalena Röck	50+	(South Korea) Jain Kim	49	(Austria) Jessica Pilz	44+
12	(Italy) Arco; 30–31 August	S	M	(Czech Republic) Libor Hroza	6.440	(France) Bassa Mawem	6.580	(Italy) Alessandro Santoni	5.990
12	(Italy) Arco; 30–31 August	S	W	(France) Anouck Jaubert	7.950	(Russia) Yuliya Levochkina	8.390	(Russia) Mariia Krasavina	8.120
13	(South Korea) Mokpo; 11–12 October	L	M	(Austria) Jakob Schubert	Top	(Slovenia) Domen Škofic	49	(France) Romain Desgranges	44+
13	(South Korea) Mokpo; 11–12 October	L	W	(Slovenia) Mina Markovič	45+	(Belgium) Anak Verhoeven	43+	(France) Hélène Janicot	38+
13	(South Korea) Mokpo; 11–12 October	S	M	(Poland) Marcin Dzieński	6.233	(Czech Republic) Libor Hroza	fall	(Ukraine) Danyil Boldyrev	5.989
13	(South Korea) Mokpo; 11–12 October	S	W	(Russia) Iuliia Kaplina	7.879	(France) Anouck Jaubert	7.973	(Poland) Patrycja Chudziak	8.936
14	(China) Wujiang; 18–19 October	L	M	(Italy) Stefano Ghisolfi	36+	(Spain) Ramón Julián Puigblanqué	36	(France) Romain Desgranges	34+
14	(China) Wujiang; 18–19 October	L	W	(Slovenia) Mina Markovič	31+	(Belgium) Anak Verhoeven	24+	(France) Hélène Janicot	20+
14	(China) Wujiang; 18–19 October	S	M	(China) QiXin Zhong	6.020	(Czech Republic) Libor Hroza	6.060	(France) Bassa Mawem	6.040
14	(China) Wujiang; 18–19 October	S	W	(Russia) Mariia Krasavina	8.070	(France) Anouck Jaubert	8.100	(Russia) Iuliia Kaplina	8.230
15	(Japan) Inzai; 25–26 October	L	M	(Czech Republic) Adam Ondra	49	(Japan) Sachi Amma	45+	(Slovenia) Domen Škofic	43+
15	(Japan) Inzai; 25–26 October	L	W	(South Korea) Jain Kim	Top	(Slovenia) Mina Markovič	47+	(Slovenia) Maja Vidmar	44+
16	(Slovenia) Kranj; 15–16 November	L	M	(Czech Republic) Adam Ondra	44+	(Canada) Sean McColl	38	(Japan) Sachi Amma	37+
16	(Slovenia) Kranj; 15–16 November	L	W	(Slovenia) Mina Markovič	46+	(South Korea) Jain Kim	42+	(Japan) Akiyo Noguchi	36
OVERALL		B	M	(Germany) Jan Hojer	558.00	(Russia) Dmitrii Sharafutdinov	467.00	(France) Guillaume Glairon Mondet	461.00
OVERALL		B	W	(Japan) Akiyo Noguchi	610.00	(United Kingdom) Shauna Coxsey	556.00	(Austria) Anna Stöhr	488.00
OVERALL		L	M	(Austria) Jakob Schubert	516.00	(Canada) Sean McColl	440.00	(Czech Republic) Adam Ondra	428.00
OVERALL		L	W	(South Korea) Jain Kim	607.00	(Slovenia) Mina Markovič	547.00	(Austria) Magdalena Röck	501.00
OVERALL		S	M	(Ukraine) Danyil Boldyrev	461.00	(Czech Republic) Libor Hroza	419.00	(Poland) Marcin Dzieński	402.00
OVERALL		S	W	(Russia) Mariia Krasavina	510.00	(Russia) Iuliia Kaplina	476.00	(France) Anouck Jaubert	455.00
OVERALL		C	M	(Canada) Sean McColl	676.00	(Czech Republic) Adam Ondra	457.00	(Slovenia) Domen Škofic	336.00
OVERALL		C	W	(Japan) Akiyo Noguchi	690.00	(Slovenia) Mina Markovič	555.00	(Japan) Momoka Oda	305.00
NATIONAL TEAMS		B	A	(Japan)	1712	France	1581	(Germany)	1259
NATIONAL TEAMS		L	A	Austria	1636	(Japan)	1594	France	1531
NATIONAL TEAMS		S	A	(Russia) Russian Federation	2137	Poland	1415	France	1216

== Bouldering ==
An overall ranking was determined based upon points, which athletes were awarded for finishing in the top 30 of each individual event. The national ranking was the sum of the points of that country's three best male and female athletes. Results displayed (in brackets) were not counted.

=== Men ===
The results of the ten most successful athletes of the Bouldering World Cup 2014:

Rank	NAME	Points	Laval 27.06.2014	Haiyang 20.06.2014	Vail 06.06.2014	Toronto 31.05.2014	Innsbruck 16.05.2014	Grindelwald 10.05.2014	Baku 03.05.2014	Chongqing 26.04.2014
1	(Germany) Jan Hojer	558	4. 55.00	1. 100.00	7. 43.00	2. 80.00	10. (34.00)	1. 100.00	2. 80.00	1. 100.00
2	(Russia) Dmitrii Sharafutdinov	467	21. 9.00	7. 43.00	1. 100.00		4. 55.00	2. 80.00	1. 100.00	2. 80.00
3	(France) Guillaume Glairon Mondet	461	2. 80.00	3. 65.00	2. 80.00	1. 100.00	5. 51.00	10. 34.00	15. (22.00)	5. 51.00
4	(Russia) Rustam Gelmanov	337	1. 100.00		20. 12.00	5. 51.00	3. 65.00	15. 22.00	3. 65.00	15. 22.00
5	(Austria) Kilian Fischhuber	325			5. 51.00	8. 40.00	1. 100.00	3. 65.00	4. 55.00	19. 14.00
6	(Canada) Sean McColl	302	7. 43.00	2. 80.00	3. 65.00	3. 65.00	8. 40.00	21. 9.00		
7	(France) Jeremy Bonder	272	3. 65.00		4. 55.00	7. 43.00	22. 9.00	17. 18.00	5. 51.00	11. 31.00
8	(Slovenia) Jernej Kruder	227	10. 32.00		15. 22.00	9. 37.00	7. 43.00	6. 47.00	16. 20.00	13. 26.00
9	(South Korea) Jongwon Chon	195	15. 22.00	4. 55.00	16. 20.00	4. 55.00				7. 43.00
10	(Netherlands) Jorg Verhoeven	193	17. 18.00	13. 26.00	17. 18.00	17. 18.00	14. 24.00		14. 24.00	3. 65.00

=== Women ===
The results of the ten most successful athletes of the Bouldering World Cup 2014:

Rank	NAME	Points	Laval 27.06.2014	Haiyang 20.06.2014	Vail 06.06.2014	Toronto 31.05.2014	Innsbruck 16.05.2014	Grindelwald 10.05.2014	Baku 03.05.2014	Chongqing 26.04.2014
1	(Japan) Akiyo Noguchi	610	1. 100.00	1. 100.00	1. 100.00	1. 100.00	3. 65.00	4. (55.00)	2. 80.00	3. 65.00
2	(United Kingdom) Shauna Coxsey	556	5. 51.00	2. 80.00	5. (51.00)	2. 80.00	1. 100.00	1. 100.00	3. 65.00	2. 80.00
3	(Austria) Anna Stöhr	488	6. 47.00	3. 65.00	3. 65.00	8. (40.00)	2. 80.00	2. 80.00	1. 100.00	5. 51.00
4	(Germany) Juliane Wurm	430	3. 65.00	5. 51.00	7. 43.00	5. 51.00	8. (40.00)	3. 65.00	4. 55.00	1. 100.00
5	(Japan) Miho Nonaka	300	2. 80.00	6. 47.00	11. 31.00	4. 55.00	6. 47.00	8. 40.00		
6	(United States) Alex Puccio	289			10. 34.00	3. 65.00	9. 37.00	5. 51.00	6. 47.00	4. 55.00
7	(France) Marine Thévenet	277	9. 37.00		6. 47.00	14. 24.00	5. 51.00	12. 28.00	7. 43.00	6. 47.00
8	(France) Fanny Gibert	270	4. 55.00		2. 80.00	12. 28.00	13. 26.00	23. 7.00	11. 31.00	7. 43.00
9	(Austria) Katharina Saurwein	197	16. 20.00	8. 40.00	9. 37.00	16. 20.00	7. 43.00		12. 28.00	21. 9.00
10	(Japan) Momoka Oda	174		10. 34.00			10. 32.00	10. 34.00	8. 40.00	10. 34.00

=== National Teams ===
The results of the ten most successful countries of the Bouldering World Cup 2014:

Country names as used by the IFSC

Rank	Nation	Points	Laval 6/27/2014	Haiyang 6/20/2014	Vail 6/6/2014	Toronto 5/31/2014	Innsbruck 5/16/2014	Grindelwald 5/10/2014	Baku 5/3/2014	Chongqing 4/26/2014
1	Japan	1712	216	294	230	241	(177)	275	237	219
2	France	1581	328	(65)	294	213	229	123	188	206
3	Germany	1259	173	(151)	154	189	153	203	173	214
4	(Russia) Russian Federation	1195	116	163	112	(51)	186	133	268	217
5	Austria	1150	124	105	153	100	260	206	202	(74)
6	(United Kingdom) Great Britain	746	110	100	(54)	96	120	116	100	104
7	United States	672	27	(6)	222	179	37	68	77	62
8	Slovenia	462	32		32	84	93	108	71	42
9	(South Korea) Republic of Korea	401	56	168	30	92				55
10	Netherlands	384	42	57	44	51	45	(9)	62	83

== Lead ==
An overall ranking was determined based upon points, which athletes were awarded for finishing in the top 30 of each individual event. The national ranking was the sum of the points of that country's three best male and female athletes. Results displayed (in brackets) were not counted.

=== Men ===
The results of the ten most successful athletes of the Lead World Cup 2014:

Rank	NAME	Points	Kranj 15.11.2014	Inzai 25.10.2014	Wujiang 18.10.2014	Mokpo 11.10.2014	Imst 01.08.2014	Briançon 19.07.2014	Chamonix 10.07.2014	Haiyang 20.06.2014
1	(Austria) Jakob Schubert	516.00	5. 51.00	4. 55.00	17. (18.00)	1. 100.00	3. 65.00	3. 65.00	2. 80.00	1. 100.00
2	(Canada) Sean McColl	440.00	2. 80.00	5. 51.00	5. 51.00	5. 51.00	2. 80.00	6. 47.00	9. (37.00)	2. 80.00
3	(Czech Republic) Adam Ondra	428.00	1. 100.00	1. 100.00	19. 14.00	9. 37.00	1. 100.00	8. 40.00	27. (4.00)	9. 37.00
4	(France) Romain Desgranges	414.00	7. 43.00	7. (43.00)	3. 65.00	3. 65.00	4. 55.00	2. 80.00	5. 51.00	4. 55.00
5	(Slovenia) Domen Škofic	410.00	4. 55.00	3. 65.00	4. 55.00	2. 80.00	7. 43.00	14. (24.00)	3. 65.00	6. 47.00
6	(Spain) Ramón Julián Puigblanqué	346.00	8. 40.00	25. (6.00)	2. 80.00	4. 55.00	6. 47.00	4. 55.00	6. 47.00	15. 22.00
7	(Japan) Sachi Amma	345.00	3. 65.00	2. 80.00				1. 100.00	1. 100.00	
8	(France) Gautier Supper	315.00	12. 28.00	8. 40.00	8. 40.00	8. 40.00	5. 51.00	5. 51.00	18. (16.00)	3. 65.00
9	(Italy) Stefano Ghisolfi	313.00	6. 47.00	18. 16.00	1. 100.00	6. 47.00	8. 40.00	16. 20.00	25. (6.00)	7. 43.00
10	(Norway) Magnus Midtbø	252.00		6. 47.00	12. 28.00	10. 34.00	10. 34.00	10. 32.00	7. 43.00	10. 34.00

=== Women ===
The results of the ten most successful athletes of the Lead World Cup 2014:

Rank	NAME	Points	Kranj 15.11.2014	Inzai 25.10.2014	Wujiang 18.10.2014	Mokpo 11.10.2014	Imst 01.08.2014	Briançon 19.07.2014	Chamonix 10.07.2014	Haiyang 20.06.2014
1	(South Korea) Jain Kim	607.00	2. 80.00	1. 100.00	10. (34.00)	6. 47.00	2. 80.00	1. 100.00	1. 100.00	1. 100.00
2	(Slovenia) Mina Markovič	547.00	1. 100.00	2. 80.00	1. 100.00	1. 100.00	5. 51.00	6. (47.00)	3. 65.00	5. 51.00
3	(Austria) Magdalena Röck	501.00	9. (37.00)	5. 51.00	4. 55.00	4. 55.00	1. 100.00	2. 80.00	2. 80.00	2. 80.00
4	(Belgium) Anak Verhoeven	447.00	7. (43.00)	6. 47.00	2. 80.00	2. 80.00	4. 55.00	3. 65.00	4. 55.00	3. 65.00
5	(France) Hélène Janicot	324.00	10. 34.00	7. 43.00	3. 65.00	3. 65.00	9. 37.00	9. 37.00	15. (22.00)	7. 43.00
6	(Austria) Katharina Posch	281.00	5. 51.00	12. 28.00	5. 51.00	5. 51.00	15. (22.00)	8. 40.00	13. 26.00	10. 34.00
7	(Slovenia) Maja Vidmar	265.00	8. 40.00	3. 65.00	8. 40.00	9. 37.00		4. 55.00	12. 28.00	
8	(Russia) Dinara Fakhritdinova	237.00	26. (5.00)	15. 22.00	13. 26.00	11. 31.00	13. 26.00	10. 34.00	5. 51.00	6. 47.00
9	(Japan) Yuka Kobayashi	236.00	6. 47.00	8. 40.00	6. 47.00	10. 34.00		18. 16.00	20. 12.00	8. 40.00
10	(Japan) Akiyo Noguchi	210.00	3. 65.00	4. 55.00				7. 43.00	6. 47.00	

=== National Teams ===
The results of the ten most successful countries of the Lead World Cup 2014:

Country names as used by the IFSC

Rank	Nation	Points	Kranj 11/15/2014	Inzai 10/25/2014	Wujiang 10/18/2014	Mokpo 10/11/2014	Imst 8/1/2014	Briançon 7/19/2014	Chamonix 7/10/2014	Haiyang 6/20/2014
1	Austria	1636	210	(184)	204	267	288	201	220	246
2	Japan	1594	258	280	159	187	(83)	244	263	203
3	France	1531	167	(163)	194	170	230	270	236	264
4	Slovenia	1373	270	210	195	217	141	134	206	(98)
5	(South Korea) Republic of Korea	951	80	100	(34)	162	95	149	142	223
6	Canada	548	98	65	85	75	89	47	(37)	89
7	Belgium	542	65	(55)	96	87	69	73	64	88
8	Italy	538	90	(16)	100	47	138	75	45	43
9	(Russia) Russian Federation	468	(6)	22	26	40	84	81	112	103
10	Czech Republic	440	100	100	26	37	100	40	(4)	37

== Speed ==
An overall ranking was determined based upon points, which athletes were awarded for finishing in the top 30 of each individual event. The national ranking was the sum of the points of that country's three best male and female athletes. Results displayed (in brackets) were not counted.

=== Men ===
The results of the ten most successful athletes of the Speed World Cup 2014:

Rank	NAME	Points	Wujiang 18.10.2014	Mokpo 11.10.2014	Arco 30.08.2014	Chamonix 10.07.2014	Haiyang 20.06.2014	Baku 03.05.2014	Chongqing 26.04.2014
1	(Ukraine) Danyil Boldyrev	461.00	10. (34.00)	3. 65.00	5. 51.00	1. 100.00	3. 65.00	1. 100.00	2. 80.00
2	(Czech Republic) Libor Hroza	419.00	2. 80.00	2. 80.00	1. 100.00	7. 43.00	8. (40.00)	5. 51.00	3. 65.00
3	(Poland) Marcin Dzieński	402.00	8. 40.00	1. 100.00	4. 55.00	2. 80.00	2. 80.00	11. (31.00)	6. 47.00
4	(China) QiXin Zhong	365.00	1. 100.00		16. 20.00	8. 40.00	1. 100.00	3. 65.00	8. 40.00
5	(France) Bassa Mawem	361.00	3. 65.00	4. 55.00	2. 80.00	4. 55.00	7. (43.00)	4. 55.00	5. 51.00
6	(Russia) Stanislav Kokorin	339.00	4. 55.00	7. 43.00	6. 47.00	16. (20.00)	6. 47.00	6. 47.00	1. 100.00
7	(Russia) Evgenii Vaitsekhovskii	312.00	6. 47.00	5. 51.00	15. (22.00)	14. 24.00	4. 55.00	2. 80.00	4. 55.00
8	(Russia) Arsenii Shevchenko	247.00	7. 43.00	6. 47.00	7. 43.00	10. 34.00	9. 37.00	7. 43.00	11. (31.00)
9	(France) Quentin Nambot	165.00	9. 37.00	9. 37.00	8. 40.00	5. 51.00			
10	(Italy) Leonardo Gontero	124.00			9. 37.00	11. 31.00		10. 34.00	15. 22.00

=== Women ===
The results of the ten most successful athletes of the Speed World Cup 2014:

Rank	NAME	Points	Wujiang 18.10.2014	Mokpo 11.10.2014	Arco 30.08.2014	Chamonix 10.07.2014	Haiyang 20.06.2014	Baku 03.05.2014	Chongqing 26.04.2014
1	(Russia) Mariia Krasavina	510.00	1. 100.00	6. (47.00)	3. 65.00	3. 65.00	1. 100.00	1. 100.00	2. 80.00
2	(Russia) Iuliia Kaplina	476.00	3. 65.00	1. 100.00	15. (22.00)	5. 51.00	2. 80.00	2. 80.00	1. 100.00
3	(France) Anouck Jaubert	455.00	2. 80.00	2. 80.00	1. 100.00	4. (55.00)	3. 65.00	3. 65.00	3. 65.00
4	(Poland) Klaudia Buczek	290.00	4. 55.00	4. 55.00	18. (16.00)	7. 43.00	7. 43.00	7. 43.00	5. 51.00
5	(Russia) Yuliya Levochkina	265.00			2. 80.00	12. 28.00	5. 51.00	5. 51.00	4. 55.00
6	(Poland) Aleksandra Mirosław	250.00			16. 20.00	2. 80.00	4. 55.00	4. 55.00	8. 40.00
7	(Russia) Alina Gaidamakina	242.00			13. 26.00	1. 100.00	6. 47.00	6. 47.00	15. 22.00
7	(Poland) Monika Prokopiuk	242.00	7. 43.00	5. 51.00	6. 47.00	8. 40.00	9. 37.00	15. (22.00)	14. 24.00
9	(Poland) Edyta Ropek	225.00	5. 51.00	8. 40.00	9. 37.00	16. (20.00)	10. 34.00	13. 26.00	9. 37.00
10	(Poland) Patrycja Chudziak	204.00	6. 47.00	3. 65.00	4. 55.00	9. 37.00			

=== National Teams ===
The results of the ten most successful countries of the Speed World Cup 2014:

Country names as used by the IFSC

Rank	Nation	Points	Wujiang 10/18/2014	Mokpo 10/11/2014	Arco 8/30/2014	Chamonix 7/10/2014	Haiyang 6/20/2014	Baku 5/3/2014	Chongqing 4/26/2014
1	(Russia) Russian Federation	2137	318	(288)	306	315	370	401	427
2	Poland	1415	(193)	271	241	267	215	220	201
3	France	1216	182	172	238	207	(108)	203	214
4	Ukraine	854	74	108	198	165	(65)	160	149
5	People's Republic of China	547	157		28	40	164	65	93
6	Czech Republic	428	80	80	100	52	(40)	51	65
7	Indonesia	281					209		72
8	Italy	279			136	87		34	22
9	(South Korea) Republic of Korea	205	24	119			62		
10	Austria	186			65	79		42	

== Combined ==
5 best competition results are counting for IFSC Climbing Worldcup 2014. Not counting points are in brackets.

Participation in at least 2 disciplines is required.

=== Men ===
The results of the ten most successful athletes of the Combined World Cup 2014:

Rank	NAME	Pts
1	(Canada) Sean McColl	676.00
2	(Czech Republic) Adam Ondra	457.00
3	(Slovenia) Domen Škofic	336.00
4	(Italy) Stefano Ghisolfi	324.00
5	(South Korea) Jongwon Chon	203.00
6	(Japan) Kokoro Fujii	196.00
7	(France) Alban Levier	132.00
8	(Japan) Rei Sugimoto	119.00
9	(South Korea) Jihwan Park	92.00
10	(China) ZiDa Ma	83.00

=== Women ===
The results of the ten most successful athletes of the Combined World Cup 2014:

Rank	NAME	Pts
1	(Japan) Akiyo Noguchi	690.00
2	(Slovenia) Mina Markovič	555.00
3	(Japan) Momoka Oda	305.00
4	(Russia) Dinara Fakhritdinova	281.00
5	(Japan) Miho Nonaka	277.00
6	(Austria) Katharina Posch	259.00
7	(Japan) Yuka Kobayashi	228.00
8	(France) Charlotte Durif	226.00
9	(Japan) Aya Onoe	225.00
10	(Japan) Risa Ota	198.00
