= Manuel Romain =

Columbian singer and artist

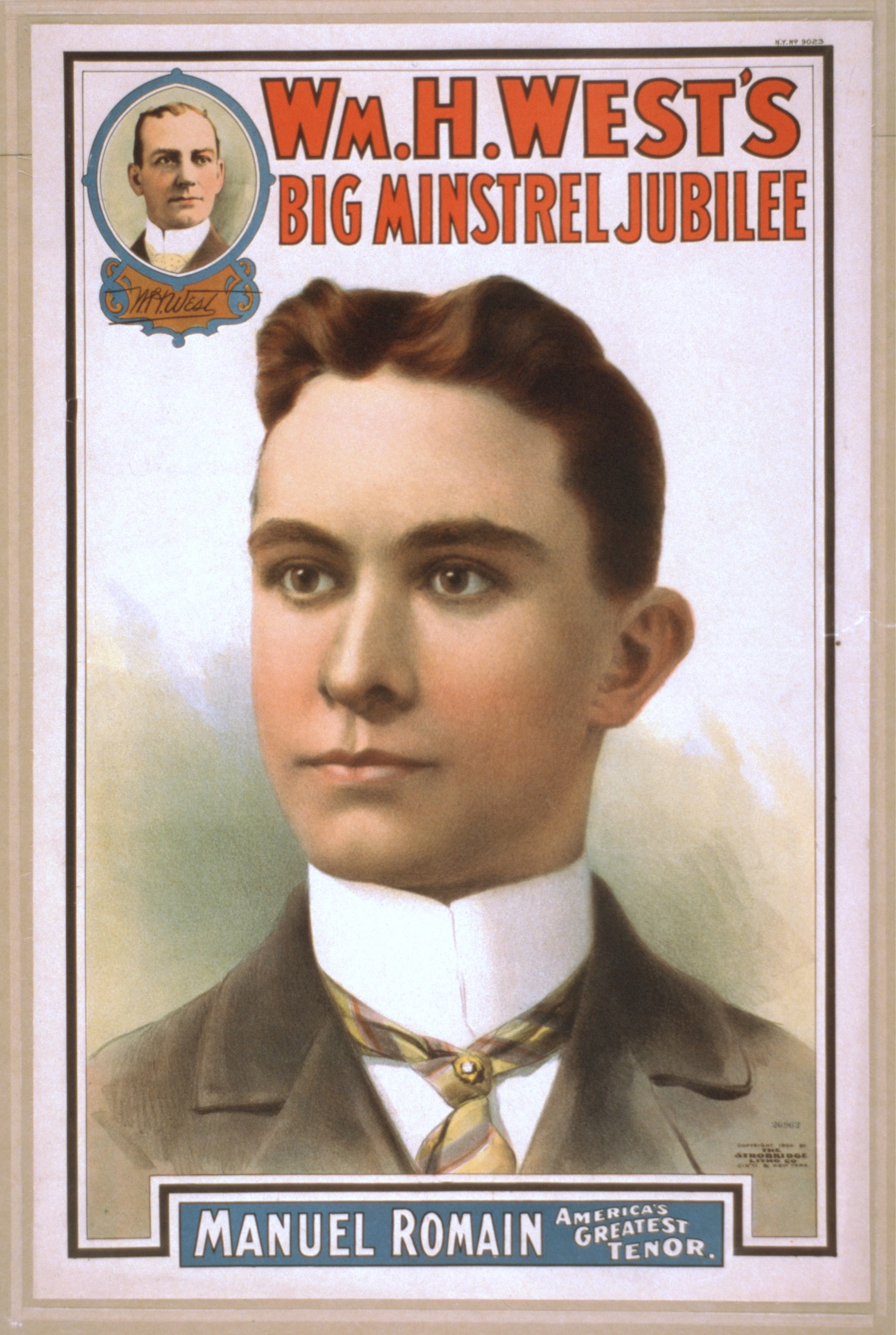
- Romain on a c. 1900 promotional poster for William H. West's Big Minstrel Jubilee
- Born: 1870; Boston, Massachusetts
- Died: December 22, 1926 (aged 56); Quincy, Massachusetts

Manuel Romain (1870 – December 22, 1926) was an American singer and recording artist. He had several bestseller recordings in Columbia Records including "When I Lost You" (1913), "I Miss You Most of All" (1914), and "You're More Than the World To Me" (1914). A tenor, he performed in vaudeville and minstrel shows in the early 1900s.

== Discography ==
- "Daisies Won't Tell" (1910) Edison records
- "That's How I Need You" / "Always Think of Mother" Columbia Records
- "Curse Of An Aching Heart", song by Al Piantadosi
- "That's a Real Moving Picture from Life" by Harry von Tilzer
- "When the sheep are in the fold, Jennie dear" (1909)
- "The Trail of the Lonesome Pine"
- "Just to Remind You"
- "I Wonder Who's Kissing Her Now" (1910)
- When I Lost You" (1913), written in 1912 by Irving Berlin after his wife of five months Dorothy Goetz died of typhoid

== See also ==
- List of Edison Blue Amberol Records: Popular Series
