= Sean McColl =

Canadian rock climber (born 1987)

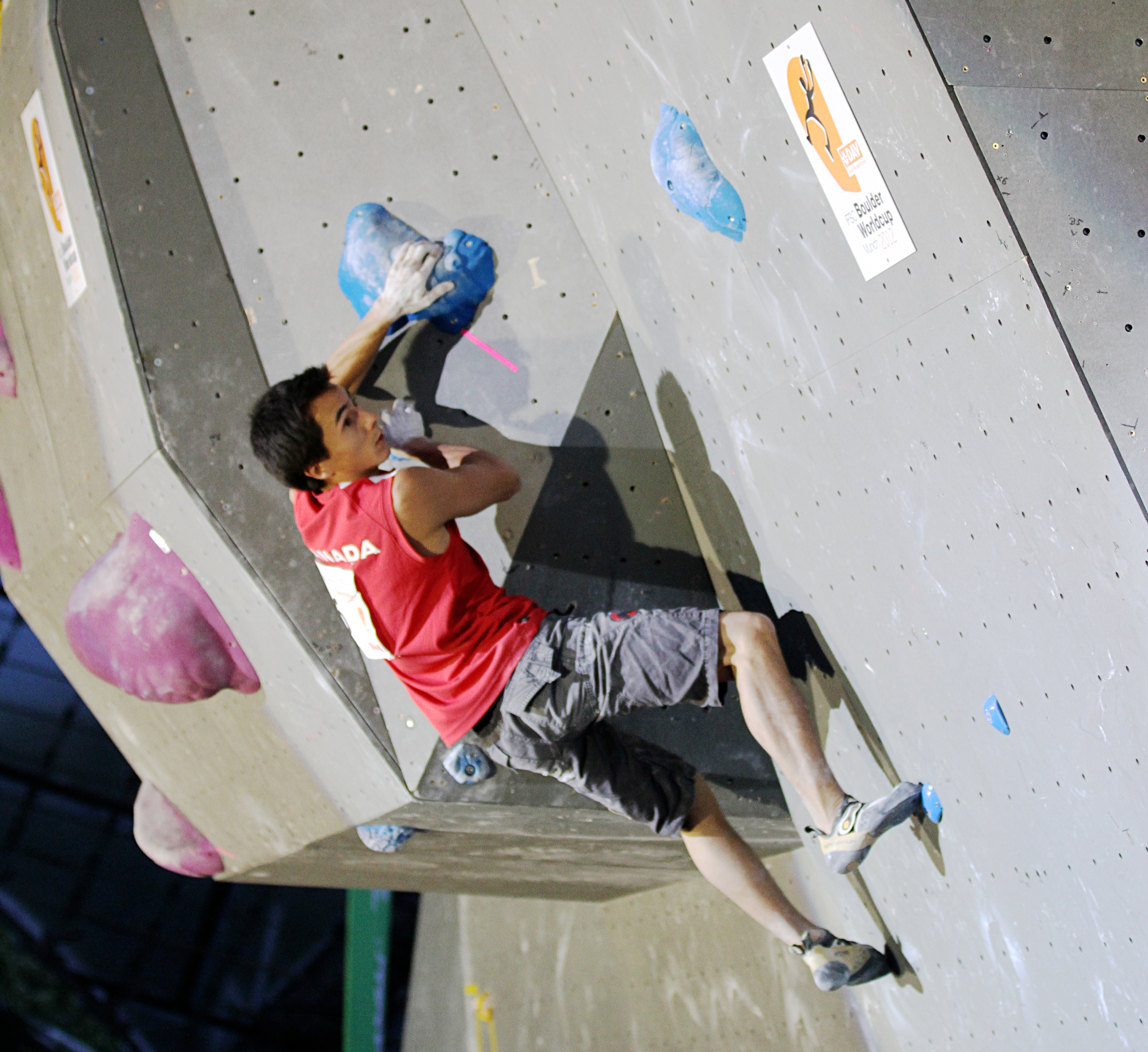
- McColl competing at the 2012 Bouldering World Cup in Munich

Personal information
- Born: 3 September 1987 (age 38) Vancouver, British Columbia, Canada
- Occupation: Professional Athlete
- Height: 169 cm (5 ft 7 in)
- Weight: 60 kg (132 lb)
- Website: www.seanmccoll.com

Climbing career
- Type of climber: Competition climbing; Sport climbing; Bouldering
- Highest grade: Redpoint: 9a (5.14d); Bouldering: V15 (8C)
- Major ascents: Dreamcatcher (5.14d); Nagual (V13), flash; Big Paw (V15); Meadowlark Lemon (V14)
Medal record
Men's competition climbing
Representing Canada
Event	1st	2nd	3rd
Lead World Cup	3	9	8
Bouldering World Cup	2	6	6
World Games	0	0	1
World Games
Bronze medal – third place	2017 Wroclaw	Lead
World Championships
Gold medal – first place	2012 Paris	Combined
Gold medal – first place	2014 Munich/Gijón	Combined
Gold medal – first place	2016 Paris	Combined
Silver medal – second place	2012 Paris	Lead
World Cup (Season)
Second place	2011	Combined
Second place	2012	Combined
Third place	2013	Bouldering
Second place	2013	Lead
Winner	2013	Combined
Second place	2014	Combined
Winner	2015	Combined
- Updated on 1 August 2022

Sean McColl (born 3 September 1987) is a professional rock climber from North Vancouver, Canada. In competition climbing, he competes in the competition lead climbing, competition speed climbing, and competition bouldering disciplines, and has won major competitions in all three. He is also notable for his outdoor sport climbing and bouldering ascents.

== Biography ==
Sean McColl was born on 3 September 1987 in Vancouver, Canada and lived in Chambéry, France for several years in his twenties. As of the past couple of years, he travels the world training and competing. He is sponsored by VISA, Adidas, SCARPA, Flashed Climbing, Perfect Descent, Joe Rockheads, and Vertical'Art.

== Competition climbing ==
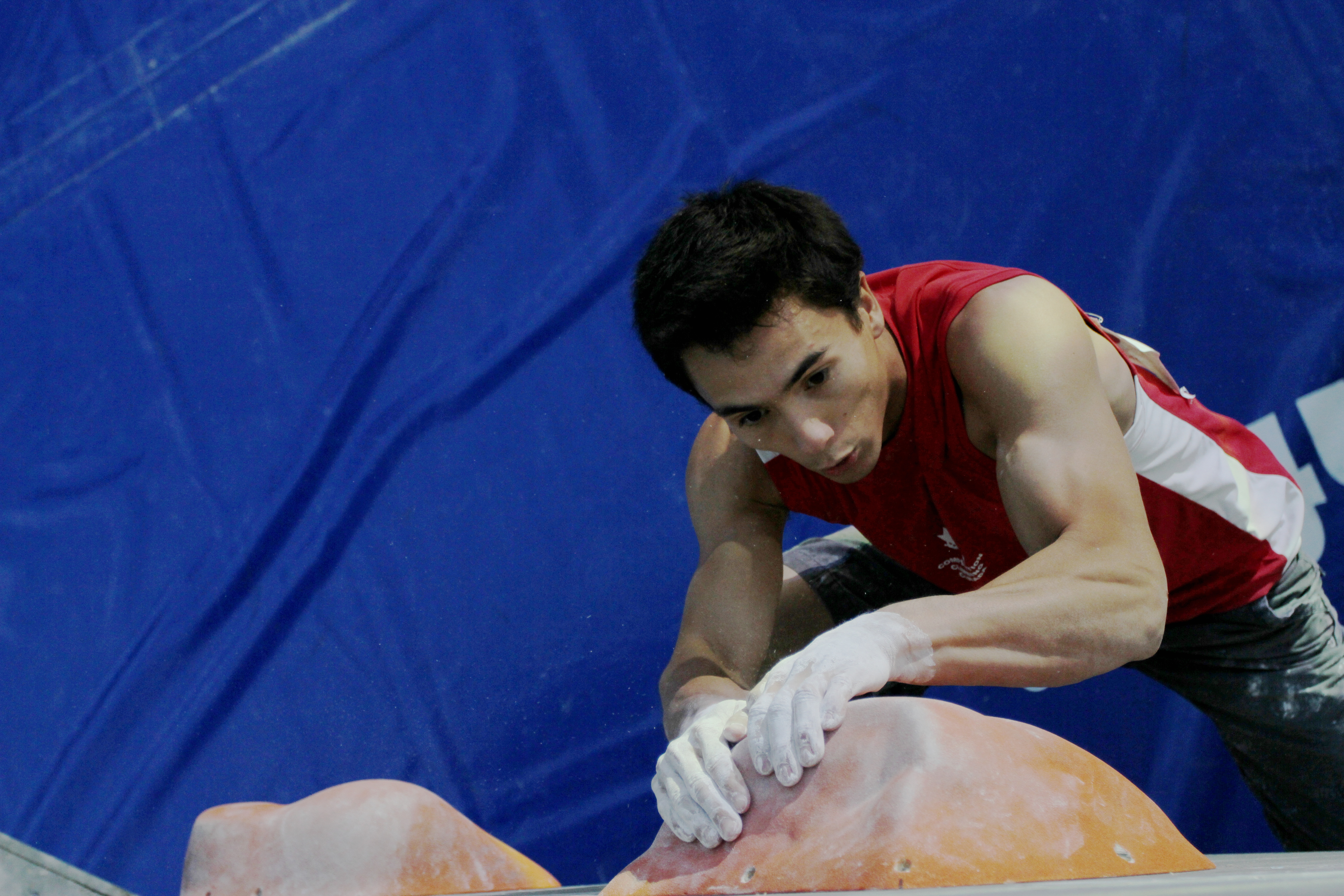
McColl at the final event of the Bouldering World Cup 2012

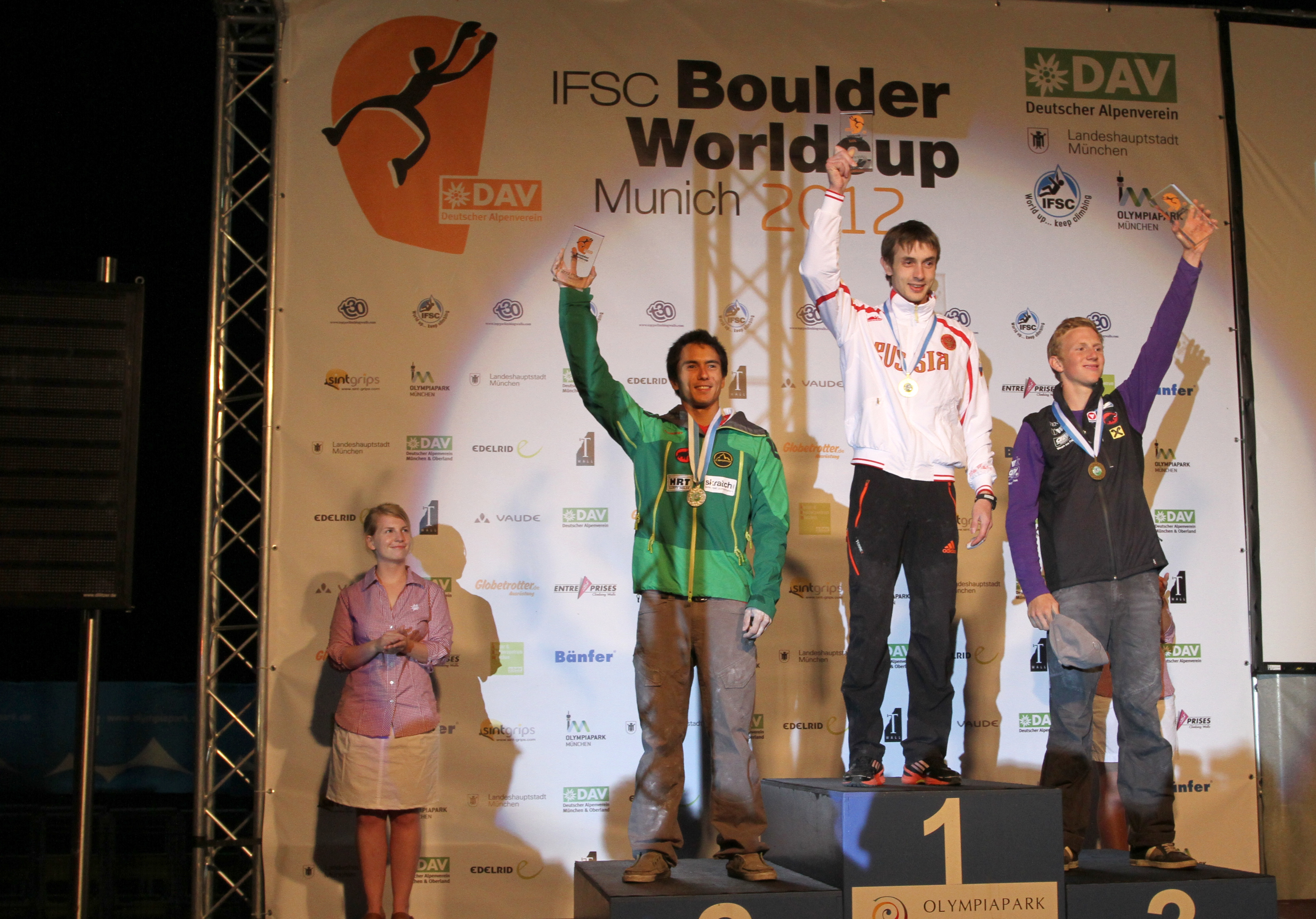
McColl winning second place at the final event of the Bouldering World Cup 2012

Sean McColl found early success while training with the Canada Youth National Climbing Team. He won the gold medal in lead climbing in his age group at the 2002, 2003, and 2004 Youth World Championships. In 2006, he won in both the lead and speed climbing categories, and was beginning to break into the top 20 finishes at adult competitions. In February 2011, McColl won first place at the 12th Annual ABS Nationals bouldering competition in Boulder, Colorado.

2012 was McColl's most successful competition season to date, with 10 podium finishes at major climbing competitions. In September, McColl competed in the IFSC Climbing World Championships, where he placed second in lead climbing and fourth in bouldering. Although he did not win either event, he earned enough points to secure first place in the overall competition. Two months later, he went to the PanAmerican Championships in Venezuela. He took first place in lead climbing and second place in bouldering, making him the first Canadian athlete to reach the podium at the competition.

In May 2013, McColl earned his first Bouldering World Cup win at an event in Log Dragomer. He was the only male competitor to solve three of the four finals problems, taking first place over Jan Hojer and Dmitri Sarafutdinov. One week later, McColl took fourth place at the World Cup in Innsbruck. He placed fourth once again in June at the World Cup event in Vail.

McColl is known as a very strong athlete both in bouldering and lead. Although he was never able to win a World Championship in these individual disciplines, in 2012 he won the overall IFSC Climbing World Championships, by ranking second in lead and fourth in bouldering. From 2011 to 2014, he consistently obtained very high IFSC Climbing World Cup rankings in both disciplines. In 2014 and 2016, he won the Combined World Cup, while in 2011, 2012, 2013, and 2015 he ranked second in the Combined World Cup.

McColl won the bronze medal at The World Games 2017 in Wrocław, Poland.

McColl qualified for the Olympics at the 2019 IFSC Climbing World Championships. He went on to represent Canada at the 2020 Summer Olympics, where he placed 17th in the combined competition.

=== Ninja Warrior ===
In 2014, McColl competed for Team Europe in American Ninja Warrior: USA vs. The World, and led his team to victory. On Stage 2, McColl blew through the stage, at one point landing hard on his stomach. During Stage 3, McColl fell on the final obstacle, just feet from the end, allowing the American team the opportunity to tie up the competition. On Stage 4, although the Americans started strong, McColl flew up the rope, beating their time by three-tenths of a second.

== Rankings ==
=== Climbing World Cup ===
Discipline	2003	2004	2005	2006	2007	2008	2009	2010	2011	2012	2013	2014	2015	2016	2017
Lead	56	-	-	20	-	9	12	43	6	4	5	2	8	6	21
Bouldering	-	-	-	27	-	8	11	11	13	5	3	6	8	6	40
Speed	-	-	-	-	-	-	-	-	-	24	32	29	17	36	84
Combined	-	-	-	11	-	6	6	6	2	2	2	1	2	1	41

=== Climbing World Championships ===
Youth

Discipline	2001 Youth B	2002 Youth B	2003 Youth A	2004 Youth A	2005 Juniors	2006 Juniors
Lead	-	1	1	1	6	1
Speed	1	-	-	-	8	1

Adult

Discipline	2007	2009	2011	2012	2014	2016
Lead	41	5	13	2	6	6
Bouldering	25	6	11	4	9	14
Speed	-	43	53	43	26	38
Combined	-	1	-	1	1	1

== Number of medals in the Climbing European Youth Cup ==
=== Lead ===
Season	Category	Gold	Silver	Bronze	Total
2001	Youth B			1	1
2006	Juniors			1	1
Total		0	0	2	2

== Number of medals in the Climbing World Cup ==
=== Lead ===
Season	Gold	Silver	Bronze	Total
2008			1	1
2009			1	1
2010				0
2011	1	1		2
2012	1	1	2	4
2013		2	2	4
2014		3		3
2015		1	1	2
2016	1		1	2
2017		1		1
Total	3	9	8	20

=== Bouldering ===
Season	Gold	Silver	Bronze	Total
2008			1	1
2009		1		1
2010		1		1
2011			1	1
2012		2	1	3
2013	1			1
2014		1	2	3
2015	1			1
2016			1	1
2018		1		1
Total	2	6	6	14

== Notable ascents ==
=== Routes ===
In September 2009, McColl claimed the second ascent of Dreamcatcher, a sport route in Squamish, British Columbia. Rated 5.14d on the Yosemite Decimal System, Dreamcatcher is considered one of the hardest climbing routes in Canada. It was first established and climbed by Chris Sharma in 2005, and was unrepeated for four years despite efforts by Ethan Pringle, Sonnie Trotter and Paul Robinson.

=== Boulders ===
In March 2012, McColl competed in the Hueco Rock Rodeo, an annual outdoor bouldering competition in Hueco Tanks, Texas. During the competition, he completed Nagual (rated V13 on the V-scale) in one attempt, an accomplishment known as a "flash". McColl is one of few climbers to have flashed a bouldering problem with such a high degree of difficulty.

== See also ==
- List of first ascents (sport climbing)
- History of rock climbing
- Rankings of most career IFSC gold medals
