= Dmitrii Sharafutdinov =

Russian rock climber (born 1986)

Dmitri Sarafutdinov
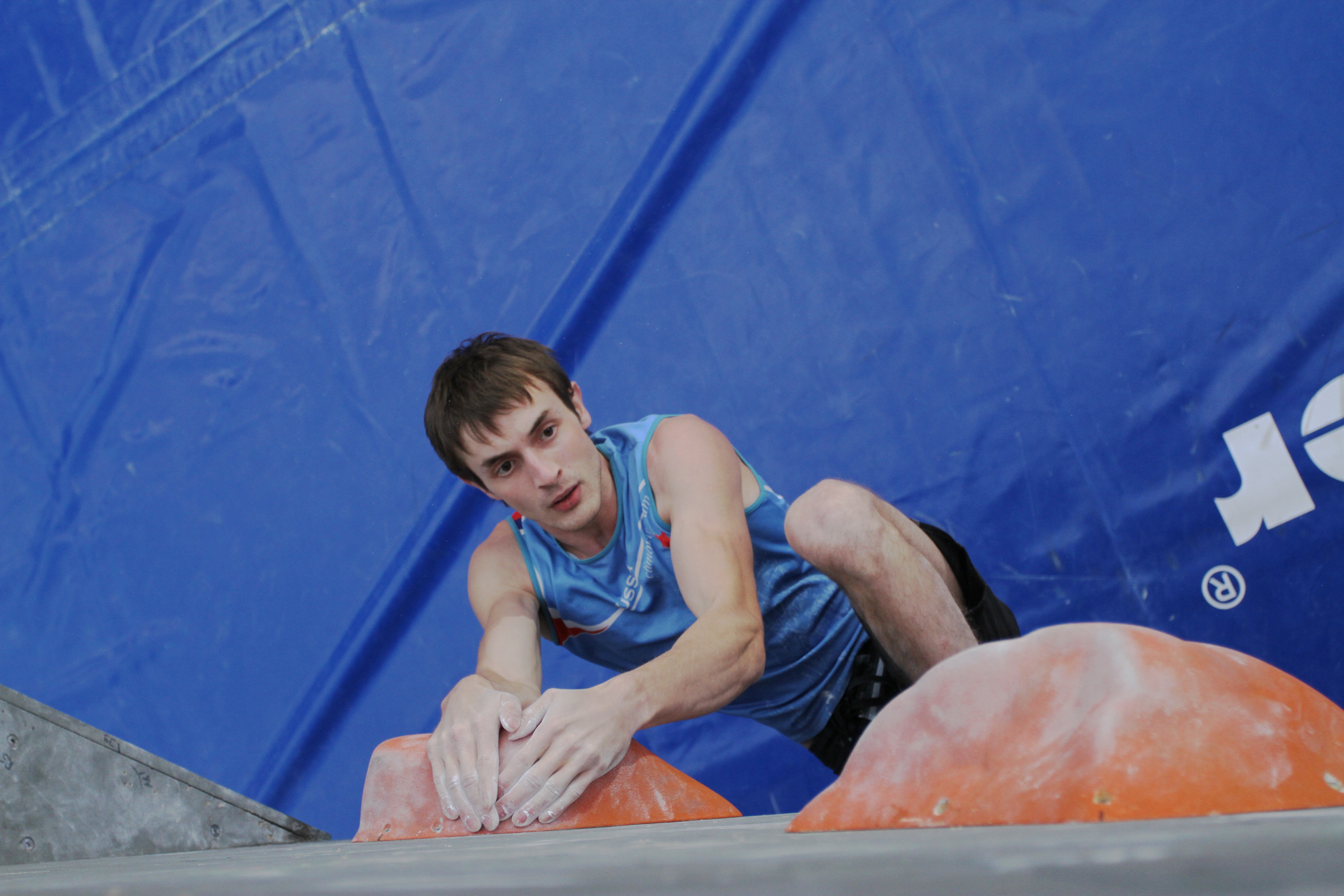
- Climbing at the Bouldering Worldcup August 2012

Personal information
- Nationality: Russian
- Born: 16 September 1986 (age 40) Korkino, Chelyabinsk Oblast, Russia
- Height: 178 cm (5 ft 10 in)
- Weight: 59 kg (130 lb)

Climbing career
- Type of climber: Competition climbing; Sport climbing; Bouldering
- Highest grade: Redpoint: 9a+ (5.15a)
- Known for: Winning 3 World Championships and 1 World Cup
Medal record
Men's competition climbing
Representing Russia
World Championships
Gold medal – first place	2007 Avilés	Bouldering
Gold medal – first place	2011 Arco	Bouldering
Gold medal – first place	2012 Paris	Bouldering
World Cup
Second place	2007	Bouldering
Third place	2008	Bouldering
Second place	2011	Bouldering
Winner	2013	Bouldering
Second place	2014	Bouldering
European Championships
Silver medal – second place	2013	Bouldering
Bronze medal – third place	2006	Lead
- Updated on 28 July 2017

Dmitri Sarafutdinov (Russian: Дмитрий Рафаилевич Шарафутдинов; born 16 September 1986 in Korkino), also known as Dmitrii Sharafutdinov, is a professional Russian rock climber and competition climber who specializes in competition bouldering. He has won three World Championships, in 2007, 2011 and 2012 and one Bouldering World Cup in 2013.

== Climbing career ==
Dmitri started climbing when he was six years old and trained in a small climbing gym in Korkino.

=== Competition climbing ===
In 2002 he started competing in the youth competition speed climbing and competition lead climbing disciplines. In 2002 he won the bronze medal in speed Youth A at the World Youth Championship in Canteleu, France and in 2004 he won the bronze medal in lead Junior at the World Youth Championship in Edinburgh.

In 2003 he began competing in the senior categories, in lead, speed, and bouldering disciplines, and in 2004 he won the Russian Climbing Championship in bouldering. From 2007 he focused on bouldering where he achieved his greatest success.

On 24 April 2007 Dmitri took his first podium in the Bouldering World Cup placing second in Sofia, and on 23 June he gained his first victory at Fiera di Primiero, Italy. He ended the season in second place behind Kilian Fischhuber. In the same year he won his first gold medal at the World Championships in Avilés, Spain.

In 2011 he achieved five podiums and the final second place in the Bouldering World Cup and his second gold medal at the World Championships in Arco, Italy. In 2012 he won his third World Championships, in Paris.

In 2013 he won his first Bouldering World Cup title, with two wins, one second and two podium finishes out of eight events.

=== Rock climbing ===
In July 2012 he climbed his hardest sport climbing route, the 9a+ (5.15a)-graded route, Ali-Hulk extension, in Rodellar, Spain. The route consists of a boulder route and a sport climbing route that are linked together.

== Rankings ==
=== Climbing World Cup ===
Discipline	2003	2004	2005	2006	2007	2008	2009	2010	2011	2012	2013	2014	2015	2016	2017
Bouldering	56	-	27	23	2	3	24	4	2	4	1	2	11	12	24
Lead	63	-	44	-	44	-	-	-	-	-	49	-	-	-	-
Speed	20	-	11	19	16	27	-	-	-	-	-	-	-	-	-
Combined	14	-	3	10	4	4	-	-	-	-	4	-	-	-	77

=== Climbing World Championships ===
Discipline	2005	2007	2009	2011	2012	2014	2016
Bouldering	7	1	-	1	1	5	33
Lead	30	47	-	-	-	-	-
Speed	-	11	-	-	-	-	-

=== Climbing European Championships ===
Discipline	2004	2006	2007	2008	2010	2013	2015
Bouldering	8	-	4	5	9	2	11
Lead	54	3	-	41	-	18	-
Speed	-	8	-	-	-	22	-

== Number of medals in the World Cup ==
=== Bouldering ===
Season	Gold	Silver	Bronze	Total
2007	2	1		3
2008	2	1		3
2009				0
2010	1	1		2
2011	2	2	1	5
2012	1	1		2
2013	2	1	2	5
2014	2	2		4
Total	12	9	3	24

== See also ==
- List of grade milestones in rock climbing
- History of rock climbing
- Rankings of most career IFSC gold medals
