= USA Climbing =

Governing body for competition climbing

- Formation: 1 January 1988
- Type: 501(c)3 non-profit sports federation
- Headquarters: Salt Lake City, Utah, U.S.
- Members: IFSC
- President: Kate Felsen Di Pietro
- CEO: Marc Norman
- Website: USA Climbing

USA Climbing is the national governing body of the sport of competition climbing in the United States. As a 501(c)3 non-profit, they promote Sport Climbing which comprises three competition disciplines: bouldering, lead climbing, and speed climbing, in elite, youth and collegiate formats.

USA Climbing receives sanctioning and is recognized by the following organizations: the International Federation of Sport Climbing (IFSC), the International Olympic Committee (IOC), and the United States Olympic & Paralympic Committee.

== Competition history ==
Below is a brief timeline of American competition climbing history:

- 1988 & 1989 – Stand-alone World Cup events at Snowbird, Utah, were organized by UIAA and the American Alpine Club.
- 1994 – Junior National Championship organized by the American Sport Climbers Federation (ASCF) is created.
- 1998 – The ASCF became the Junior Competition Climbing Association (JCCA).
- 2002 – The JCCA expanded to include adult competitors and changed its name again to the United States Competition Climbing Association (USCCA).
- 2003 – USCCA decided to rename the organization to what it is called today, USA Climbing (USAC).
- 2004 – USAC took over operations of the American Bouldering Series (ABS).

== Competition structure ==
=== Elite ===
Any eligible climber aged 16 and older who meets the USAC qualification criteria may compete at Elite Nationals. There are no Regional or Divisional competitions for Elite competitors. The winners in each gender/event (Lead, Speed, and Bouldering) at Elite Nationals are recognized as the National Champions of the United States. However, a non-US citizen cannot be the National Champion of the US. If a non-US citizen wins any gender/event, the next highest-placed US citizen in that gender/event is declared the National Champion.

=== Youth ===
Youth climbers are subdivided into 5 age groups. As of the 2024–25 season, USA Climbing no longer categorizes youth athletes using the Jr, A, B, C, D system. The age ranges are based on how old the competitor will be by the end of the season, not their current age:

- U20 (19 years old)
- U19 (17–18 years old)
- U17 (15–16 years old)
- U15 (13–14 years old)
- U13 (≤12 years old)

The US is subdivided into 9 Divisions and 18 Regions. Anyone may compete in local competitions. USA Climbing members who have attended at least two local competitions and place in the top 26 in their region may compete at their respective Regional Championships. The top 13 competitors in each gender/category at Regionals receive an invitation to compete at their respective Divisional Championships. The top 6 competitors in each gender/category at the Divisional Championships receive an invitation to compete at the National Championships. The top four climbers in each gender/category/event at the National Championships are considered to be the U.S. Youth National Team. Youth on the National Teams for the U19 and U17 categories are eligible to compete at the Youth Pan American and Youth World Championships.

Starting with the 2024-2025 season:

USA Climbing adopted U13, U15, U17, U19, and U20 category names based on birth year, doing away with the Jr/A/B/C/D terms. This restructuring was driven by a desire to align with international standards and IFSC changes, especially for youth progression and eligibility for international events like Youth World Championships.

Starting in 2025-2026 season: youth age groups split into U20 M/O and F, U19 M/O and F, U17 M/O and F, U15 M/O and F, and U13 M/O/F.

=== Collegiate ===
Provides access for undergraduate or graduate students that are currently enrolled at a college or university to compete in bouldering, lead and speed climbing.

=== Adaptive ===
Adaptive provides access for athletes with physical disabilities to compete in both bouldering and lead/top rope climbing.

Categories included in Adaptive are open to those with physical disabilities: Neurological / Physical Disability, Visual Impairment, Upper Extremity Amputee, Lower Extremity, Amputee, Seated, Youth.

== Elite bouldering ==
The following are the results for bouldering at Elite National Championship level.

=== Male ===
Year	Gold	Silver	Bronze
2005	Daniel Woods	Mike Feinberg	Matt Segal
2006	Daniel Woods	Ethan Pringle	Nicholas Sherman
2007	Daniel Woods	Paul Robinson	Sean McColl
2008	Paul Robinson	Chris Sharma	Sean McColl
2009	Daniel Woods	Paul Robinson	Sean McColl
2010	Daniel Woods	Matt Bosley	Robert D'Anastasio
2011	Sean McColl	Alex Johnson	Kyle Owen
2012	Daniel Woods	Ethan Pringle	Michael Bautista
2013	Daniel Woods	Ian Dory	Vasya Vorotnikov
2014	Daniel Woods	Vasya Vorotnikov	Andy Lamb
2015	Mohammad Jafari Mahmodabadi	Daniel Woods	Michael O'Rourke
2016	Nathaniel Coleman	Jimmy Webb	Carlo Traversi
2017	Nathaniel Coleman	Kai Lightner	Alexey Rubtsov
2018	Nathaniel Coleman	Sean Bailey	Drew Ruana
2019	Sean Bailey	Nathaniel Coleman	Drew Ruana
2020	Nathaniel Coleman	Sean Bailey	Ben Hanna
2021	Colin Duffy	Ben Hanna	Zach Galla
2022	Dillon Countryman	Sean Bailey	Luke Muehring
2023	Adam Shahar	Hugo Hoyer	Dillon Countryman
2024	Vail Everett	Zander Waller	Brendan Beauchamp
2025	Benjamin Hanna	Joshua Gerhardt	Vail Everett
2026	Hugo Hoyer	Cozmo Rothfork	Sergey Lakhno

=== Female ===
Year	Gold	Silver	Bronze
2005	Portia Menlove	Lizzy Asher	Alex Johnson
2006	Alex Puccio	Alex Johnson	Angie Payne
2007	Alex Puccio	Elizabeth Asher	Angie Payne
2008	Alex Puccio	Alex Johnson	Paige Claassen
2009	Alex Johnson	Chauncenia Cox	Kate McGinnis
2010	Alex Puccio	Alex Johnson	Francesca Metcalf
2011	Alex Puccio	Francesca Metcalf	Sasha DiGiulian
2012	Alex Puccio	Angie Payne	Shauna Coxsey
2013	Alex Puccio	Andrea Szekely	Isabelle Faus
2014	Juliane Wurm	Alex Puccio	Megan Mascarenas
2015	Alex Puccio	Alex Johnson	Angie Payne
2016	Megan Mascarenas	Alex Puccio	Claire Buhrfeind
2017	Alex Puccio	Ashima Shiraishi	Brooke Raboutou
2018	Alex Puccio	Ashima Shiraishi	Brooke Raboutou
2019	Ashima Shiraishi	Alex Johnson	Margo Hayes
2020	Natalia Grossman	Cloe Coscoy	Alex Johnson
2021	Melina Costanza	Kylie Cullen	Maya Madere
2022	Anastasia Sanders	Cloe Coscoy	Mira Capicchioni
2023	Melina Costanza	Kylie Cullen	Jojo Chi
2024	Melina Costanza	Cloe Coscoy	Jojo Chi
2025	Melina Costanza	Adriene Akiko Clark	Nekaia Sanders
2026	Natalia Grossman	Brooke Raboutou	Melina Costanza

== Elite lead ==
The following are the results for lead at Elite National Championship level

=== Male ===
Year	Gold	Silver	Bronze
2004	Vadim Vinokur	Ethan Pringle	Ionel Ene
2005	Ethan Pringle	Vadim Vinokur	Daniel Woods
2006	Daniel Woods	Vasya Vorotnikov	Gabor Szekely
2007	?	?	?
2008	Chris Sharma	Jon Cardwell	Dave Graham
2009	Carlo Traversi	Dave Graham	Ethan Pringle
2010	Magnus Midtbo	Daniel Woods	Matty Hong
2011	Magnus Midtbo	Carlo Traversi	Matty Hong
2012	Vasya Vorotnikov	Dylan Barks	Daniel Woods
2013	Daniel Woods	Carlo Traversi	Noah Ridge
2014	Brad Weaver	Noah Ridge	Robert D'Anastasio
2015	Kai Lightner	Jesse Grupper	Matty Hong
2016	Sean Bailey	Kai Lightner	Ben Tresco
2017	Kai Lightner	Jesse Grupper	Drew Ruana
2018	Sean Bailey	Drew Ruana	Solomon Barth
2019	Jesse Grupper	Zander Waller	Solomon Barth
2020	Not held	n/a	n/a
2021	Jesse Grupper	Colin Duffy	Nathaniel Coleman
2022	Sean Bailey	Jesse Grupper	Hugo Hoyer
2023	Hugo Hoyer	Sergey Lakhno	Ross Fulkerson
2024	Cruz Padilla	Hugo Hoyer	Sergey Lakhno
2025	Sergey Lakhno	Declan Osgood	Dillon Countryman
2026	Colin Duffy	Dillon Countryman	Jesse Grupper

=== Female ===
Year	Gold	Silver	Bronze
2004	Emily Harrington	Lizzy Asher	Elizabeth Broun
2005	Emily Harrington	Elizabeth Broun	Lizzy Asher
2006	Emily Harrington	Andrea Szekely	Mykael-Ann McGinley
2007	?	?	?
2008	Emily Harrington	Paige Claassen	Tiffany Hensley
2009	Emily Harrington	Paige Claassen	Sasha DiGiulian
2010	Sasha DiGiulian	Lauren Lee	Paige Claassen
2011	Sasha DiGiulian	Paige Claassen	Dana Riddle
2012	Sasha DiGiulian	Delaney Miller	Michaela Kiersch
2013	Charlotte Durif	Delaney Miller	Chelsea Rude
2014	Delaney Miller	Sasha DiGiulian	Claire Buhrfeind
2015	Delaney Miller	Margo Hayes	Claire Buhrfeind
2016	Margo Hayes	Grace McKeehan	Michaela Kiersch
2017	Ashima Shiraishi	Margo Hayes	Brooke Raboutou
2018	Claire Buhrfeind	Michaela Kiersch	Alex Puccio
2019	Margo Hayes	Ashima Shiraishi	Katherine Lamb
2020	Not held	n/a	n/a
2021	Quinn Mason	Melina Costanza	Kyra Condie
2022	Anastasia Sanders	Quinn Mason	Kyra Condie
2023	Melina Costanza	Adriene Clark	Analise Van Hoang
2024	Melina Costanza	Analise Van Hoang	Quinn Mason
2025	Adriene Akiko Clark	Ella Fisher	Melina Costanza
2026	Brooke Raboutou	Analise Van Hoang	Alexandra Inghilterra

== Elite speed ==
Starting with the 2021 Speed National Championships, the US competition format was changed to match the IFSC speed climbing competition format. Prior to 2021, US Speed Climbing National Champions (and final ranking placements) were determined by the fastest climber to finish the speed route. As of 2021, US Speed National Champions were determined by the winners of the IFSC knockout format.

=== Male ===
Year	Gold	Silver	Bronze
2004	Patrick Cassiday	Brian Solano	Ethan Pringle
2005	Hans Florine	Patrick Cassiday	Brett Ashton
2006	Patrick Cassiday	Vadim Vinokur	Eric Cosman
2007	?	?	?
2008	Ryan Roden	Brian Furciniti	Daniel Duran
2009	Ryan Roden	Nic Sutton	Michael Perry
2010	Eric Sanchez	Nic Sutton	Joshua Levin
2011	Alex Johnson	Joshua Levin	Mark Puccio
2012	Alex Johnson	Joshua Levin	Charlie Andrews-Jubelt
2013	Joshua Levin	Dominic LaBarge	Thomas Pitzel
2014	John Brosler	Stanislav Kokorin	Ryan Strickland
2015	Libor Hroza	John Brosler	Michael Retoff
2016	Libor Hroza	John Brosler	Max Hammer
2017	John Brosler	Libor Hroza	Max Hammer
2018	John Brosler	Jordan Fishman	Max Hammer
2019	John Brosler	Noah Bratschi	Joe Goodacre
2020	Not held	n/a	n/a
2021	Joe Goodacre	Rafe Stokes	Micah Liss
2022	Sam Watson	Merritt Ernsberger	Noah Bratschi
2023	Michael Hom	Thomas Lin	Logan Miner
2024	Merritt Ernsberger	Logan Miner	Taede Mai
2025	Michael Hom	Logan Schlecht	Merritt Ernsberger
2026	Ben Jennings	Noah Bratschi	William Eaton

=== Female ===
Year	Gold	Silver	Bronze
2004	Mykael-Ann McGinley	Audrey Gawrych	Emily Harrington
2005	Mykael-Ann McGinley	Stephanie Outland	Josie McKee
2006	Mykael-Ann McGinley	Jayme Hatch	Stephanie Outland
2007			
2008	Tiffany Hensley	Amanda Sutton	Stephanie Outland
2009	Amanda Sutton	Mykael-Ann McGinley	Tiffany Hensley
2010	Shannon Lochridge	Amanda Sutton	Taylor Mitchell
2011	Dana Riddle	Amanda Sutton	Delaney Miller
2012	Danielle Rogan	Jacquelyn Wu	Kyra Condie
2013	Kyra Condie	Kayla Lieuw	Marissa Romero
2014	Megan Carr	Danielle Rogan	Jacquelyn Wu
2015	Sidney Trinidad	Grace Mckeehan	Kyra Condie
2016	Claire Buhrfeind	Sidney Trinidad	Erica Meister
2017	Claire Buhrfeind	Amanda Wooten	Grace McKeehan
2018	Claire Buhrfeind	Piper Kelly	Amanda Wooten
2019	Emma Hunt	Piper Kelly	Sienna Kopf
2020	Not held	n/a	n/a
2021	Callie Close	Emma Hunt	Piper Kelly
2022	Callie Close	Piper Kelly	Sophia Curcio
2023	Isis Rothfork	Kaitlyn Bone	Kailer Kordewick
2024	Emma Hunt	Sophia Curcio	Isis Rothfork
2025	Micaela Patajo	Kayleigh Borek	Isis Rothfork
2026	Sophia Curcio	Piper Kelly	Kayleigh Borek

=== Current US speed climbing records ===
Starting in 2023, USA Climbing adopted the same criteria as the Elite category to officially recognize Speed climbing records for Youth age groups. One key criterion is the use of an officially recognized electronic timing system. Historically, youth records were maintained for developmental purposes without official standards. Now, official Youth speed climbing records can only be set at specific events: USAC Youth Qualifying Events, USAC Youth Regional Championships, USAC Youth Divisional Championships, USAC Youth National Championships, IFSC Youth Pan American Championships, IFSC Youth World Championships, and other USAC or IFSC sanctioned events in which youth age groups compete. Records are not kept for youth age groups C and D because the speed climbing routes vary at each competition.

Men's	15 meter		10 meter	
	Time (seconds)	Athlete	Time (seconds)	Athlete
Elite	4.74	Sam Watson	3.95	John Brosler
Junior	5.75	Logan Minor	4.03	Noah Bratschi
Youth A	5.32	Zach Hammer	4.34	John Brosler
Youth B	6.18	Sam Watson	5.03	Michael Retoff

Women's	15 meter		10 meter	
	Time (seconds)	Athlete	Time (seconds)	Athlete
Elite	6.38	Emma Hunt	5.64	Claire Buhrfeind
Junior	7.55	Emma Hunt	5.80	Piper Kelly
Youth A	7.84	Sophia Curcio	5.88	Grace McKeehan
Youth B	7.96	Jojo Chi	6.33	Sidney Trinidad

==== History of the US speed climbing record ====
Beginning in 2019, USA Climbing established specific criteria for setting official National Records in the Elite Speed Climbing category. As such, the National Records below for the Elite category have been officially recognized by USA Climbing.

Men's National Record History
Date	Time (s)	Athlete	Location	Competition
April 28, 2023	5.02	Sam Watson	Seoul, South Korea	2023 IFSC World Cup
May 20, 2022	5.20	John Brosler	Salt Lake City, Utah	2022 IFSC World Cup
May 28, 2021	5.60	John Brosler	Salt Lake City, Utah	2021 IFSC World Cup
March 28, 2021	5.62	John Brosler	Memphis, Tennessee	USA Climbing Team Trials Invitational
March 28, 2021	5.85	Noah Bratschi	Memphis, Tennessee	USA Climbing Team Trials Invitational
January 20, 2019	5.99	John Brosler	Salt Lake City, Utah	USA Climbing Combined Invitational

Women's National Record History
Date	Time (s)	Athlete	Location	Competition
August 10, 2023	6.67	Emma Hunt	Bern, Switzerland	2023 IFSC World Championships
July 2, 2023	6.68	Emma Hunt	Villars, Switzerland	2023 IFSC World Cup
May 7, 2023	6.79	Emma Hunt	Jakarta, Indonesia	2023 IFSC World Cup
April 28, 2023	6.82	Emma Hunt	Seoul, Korea	2023 IFSC World Cup
Sept 10, 2022	6.84	Emma Hunt	Edinburgh, Scotland	2022 IFSC World Cup
July 2, 2021	7.19	Emma Hunt	Villars, Switzerland	2021 IFSC World Cup
July 2, 2021	7.43	Emma Hunt	Villars, Switzerland	2021 IFSC World Cup
May 28, 2021	7.52	Emma Hunt	Salt Lake City, Utah	2021 IFSC World Cup
March 29, 2021	7.56	Emma Hunt	Memphis, Tennessee	USA Climbing Team Trials Invitational
March 29, 2021	7.76	Emma Hunt	Memphis, Tennessee	USA Climbing Team Trials Invitational
March 29, 2021	7.95	Emma Hunt	Memphis, Tennessee	USA Climbing Team Trials Invitational
March 28, 2021	8.04	Emma Hunt	Memphis, Tennessee	USA Climbing Team Trials Invitational
March 1, 2020	8.05	Emma Hunt	Los Angeles, California	IFSC Pan American Championships

== Elite team (current) ==
The athletes who represent the United States in International competition events.

- Bouldering & Lead National Team – Men
  - Colin Duffy
- Bouldering & Lead National Team – Women
  - Adriene Akiko Clark
  - Brooke Raboutou
- Bouldering National Team – Men
  - Auggie Chi
  - Colin Duffy
  - Vail Everett
  - Ben Hanna
  - Hugo Hoyer
- Bouldering National Team – Women
  - Adriene Akiko CLark
  - Melina Costanza
  - Brooke Raboutou
  - Annie Sanders
  - Nekaia Sanders
- Speed National Team – Men
  - Noah Bratschi
  - Zach Hammer
  - Michael Hom
  - Ben Jennings
  - Sam Watson
- Speed National Team – Women
  - Sophia Curcio
  - Emma Hunt
  - Piper Kelly
  - Isis Rothfork
  - Lily Staudt
- Lead National Team – Men
  - Dillon Countryman
  - Colin Duffy
  - Ross Fulkerson
  - Jesse Grupper
  - Sergey Lakhno
- Lead National Team – Women
  - Adriene Akiko Clark
  - Ella Fisher
  - Brooke Raboutou
  - Annie Sanders
  - Analise Van Hoang

== Elite team (historical) ==
2022 - The athletes who represent the United States in International competition events in 2022.

- Bouldering & Lead National Team – Men
  - Sean Bailey
  - Nathaniel Coleman
  - Colin Duffy
  - Ben Hanna
  - Jesse Grupper
- Bouldering & Lead National Team – Women
  - Melina Costanza
  - Kylie Cullen
  - Natalia Grossman
  - Quinn Mason
  - Brooke Raboutou
- Bouldering National Team – Men
  - Sean Bailey
  - Nathaniel Coleman
  - Colin Duffy
  - Zach Galla
  - Ben Hanna
- Bouldering National Team – Women
  - Melina Costanza
  - Kylie Cullen
  - Natalia Grossman
  - Maya Madere
  - Brooke Raboutou
- Lead National Team – Men
  - Sean Bailey
  - Nathaniel Coleman
  - Colin Duffy
  - Ross Fulkerson
  - Jesse Grupper
- Lead National Team – Women
  - Kyra Condie
  - Melina Costanza
  - Natalia Grossman
  - Quinn Mason
  - Brooke Raboutou
- Speed National Team – Men
  - Noah Bratschi
  - John Brosler
  - Merritt Ernsberger
  - Joe Goodacre
  - Sam Watson
- Speed National Team – Women
  - Callie Close
  - Emma Hunt
  - Piper Kelly
  - Olivia Ma
  - Liberty Runnels

2021 - The athletes who represented the United States at International competition events in 2021.

- Men's Lead Team
  - Sean Bailey
  - Nathaniel Coleman
  - Colin Duffy
  - Timothy Kang
  - Ellis Ernsberger
- Men's Speed Team
  - Merritt Ernsberger
  - John Brosler
  - Noah Bratschi
  - Nathaniel Coleman
  - Colin Duffy
- Men's Bouldering Team
  - Nathaniel Coleman
  - Ross Fulkerson
  - Colin Duffy
  - Ben Hanna
  - John Brock
- Women's Lead Team
  - Kyra Condie
  - Natalia Grossman
  - Brooke Raboutou
  - Ashima Shiraishi
  - Maya Madere
- Women's Speed Team
  - Emma Hunt
  - Kyra Condie
  - Julia Duffy
  - Callie Close
  - Brooke Raboutou
- Women's Bouldering Team
  - Natalia Grossman
  - Kyra Condie
  - Brooke Raboutou
  - Kylie Cullen
  - Campbell Sarinopoulos

== Youth bouldering ==
=== Male Junior ===
Year	Gold	Silver	Bronze
2011	Alex Johnson	Griffin Whiteside	Mishael Beyer
2012	Michael O'Rourke	Alex Fritz	Joseph Gifford
2013	Josh Levin	Greig Seitz	Noah Ridge
2014	Sean Bailey	Dominic LaBarge	Nicholas Milburn
2015	Nathaniel Coleman	Joseph Diaz	Dalton Bunker
2016	Nathaniel Coleman	Jesse Grupper	Charles Barron
2017	Kai Lightner	Drew Ruana	Brett Walker
2018	Zach Galla	Bobby Taft-Pittman	Drew Ruana
2019	Elijah Kiser	Sam McQueen	Zach Galla
2020	Ross Fulkerson	Noah Wheeler	Clay Gordon
2021	Zander Waller	Tanner Bauer	AJ Flynn
2022	Zander Waller	Ellis Ernsberger	Leo Costanza
2023	Isaac Leff	Adam Shahar	Quinn O'Francia
2024	Adam Shahar	Dillon Countryman	Vail Everett

=== Female Junior ===
Year	Gold	Silver	Bronze
2011	Francesca Metcalf	Isabelle Faus	Jesse Youngwerth
2012	Cicada Jenerik	Francesca Metcalf	Audrey Hsu
2013	Cicada Jenerik	Michaela Kiersch	Carina Claassen
2014	Kyra Condie	Kerry Scott	Zoe Leibovitch
2015	Megan Mascarenas	Zoe Steinberg	Kyra Condie
2016	Megan Mascarenas	Claire Buhrfeind	Lily Canavan
2017	Margo Hayes	Lily Canavan	Grace McKeehan
2018	Bimini Horstmann	Melina Costanza	Maya Madere
2019	Natalia Grossman	Cloe Coscoy	Arabella Jariel
2020	Lauren Bair	Natalia Grossman	Cloe Coscoy
2021	Helen Stephens	Nekaia Sanders	Quinn Mason
2022	Helen Gillett	Isis Rothfork	Kylie Cullen
2023	Jessica Wence	Abigail Humber	Isis Rothfork
2024	Kelly Ng	Ava Kovtunovich	Ella Fisher

=== Male Youth A ===
Year	Gold	Silver	Bronze
2011	Andy Lamb	Joeseph Gifford	Josh Levin
2012	Nicholas Milburn	Dylan Barks	Nicholas Picarella
2013	Connor Everton	Sean Bailey	Ethan Rogers
2014	Nathaniel Coleman	Brendan Mitchell	Solomon Barth
2015	Kai Lightner	Shawn Raboutou	Benjamin Hanna
2016	Kai Lightner	Bobby Taft-Pittman	Rudolph Ruana
2017	Sam Struthers	Ross Fulkerson	Zach Galla
2018	Ross Fulkerson	Darren Skolnik	Gabriel Galen
2019	Zander Waller	Jordan Fishman	Nathaniel Surma
2020	Colin Duffy	Zander Waller	Leo Costanza
2021	Brian Squire	Ardch Intrachupongse	Lucas Oddi
2022	Dillon Countryman	Benn Wheeler	Brenden Beauchamp
2023	Vail Everett	Nathan Sato	Brenden Beauchamp
2024	Declan Osgood	Cozmo Rothfork	Cruz Padilla

=== Female Youth A ===
Year	Gold	Silver	Bronze
2011	Dana Riddle	Michaela Kiersch	Audrey Hsu
2012	Kyra Condie	Jacquelyn Wu	Dana Riddle
2013	Kyra Condie	Megan Mascarenas	Hannah Tolson
2014	Megan Mascarenas	Claire Bresnan	Margo Hayes
2015	Melina Costanza	Claire Buhrfeind	Grace Mckeehan
2016	Maya Madere	Georgia Bank	Sidney Trinidad
2017	Ashima Shiraishi	Brooke Raboutou	Isabel Barrientos
2018	Brooke Raboutou	Natalia Grossman	Sienna Kopf
2019	Sienna Kopf	Quinn Mason	Sarah Kate Ashton
2020	Campbell Sarinopoulos	Kylie Cullen	Norah Chi
2021	Isis Rothfork	Adriene Clark	Kylie Cullen
2022	Sovarae Sanders	Olivia Ma	Julia De la Paz
2023	Paloma Slowik	Carly Alba	Sienna Perez
2024	Jojo Chi	Analise Van Hoang	Lucy Drury

=== Male Youth B ===
Year	Gold	Silver	Bronze
2011	Nicholas Picarella	Daniel Berman	Liam Vence
2012	Nathaniel Coleman	Brendan Mitchell	Shawn Raboutou
2013	Sam Kim	Culin Li	Shawn Raboutou
2014	Kai Lightner	Lucas Kepl	Brett Walker
2015	Matthew Grossman	Joe Goodacre	Zach Galla
2016	Corbin Miley	Devon Wong	Clay Gordon
2017	Colin Duffy	Zander Waller	Dylan Duregger
2018	Anthony Lesik	Colin Duffy	Zander Waller
2019	Brian Squire	Oliver Kuang	Reece Chapman
2020	Oscar Baudrand	Ian Tan	Dillon Countryman
2021	Auggie Chi	Dillon Countryman	Hugo Hoyer
2022	Auggie Chi	Hugo Hoyer	Cruz Padilla
2023	Peter Gusev	Beckett Hsin	Cruz Padilla
2024	Banlu Rogaway	Benjamin Rose-Innes	Beckett Hsin

=== Female Youth B ===
Year	Gold	Silver	Bronze
2011	Zoe Steinberg	Megan Mascarenas	Kerry Scott
2012	Megan Mascarenas	Clara Dixon	Katherine Lamb
2013	Claire Buhrfeind	Margo Hayes	Sidney Trinidad
2014	Sidney Trinidad	Cierra Graham	Audrey Miller
2015	Lauren Bair	Ashima Shiraishi	Brooke Raboutou
2016	Ashima Shiraishi	Brooke Raboutou	Sienna Kopf
2017	Nekaia Sanders	Amelia Marcuson	Sienna Kopf
2018	Sarah Kate Ashton	Nekaia Sanders	Marielle Horstmann
2019	Mira Capicchioni	Campbell Sarinopoulos	Matti Dennis
2020	Mira Capicchioni	Ava Kovtunovich	Olivia Ma
2021	Anastasia Sanders	Alina Albert	Sienna Perez
2022	Anastasia Sanders	Analise Van Hoang	Sienna Perez
2023	Suhvin Park	Analise Van Hoang	Jojo Chi
2024	Evelyn Orton	Evie Albrecht	Lucy Duncan

=== Male Youth C ===
Year	Gold	Silver	Bronze
2011	Sam Kim	Kai Lightner	Charles Barron
2012	Kai Lightner	Jake Fields	Gavin Dixon
2013	Mirko Caballero	Matthew Grossman	Clay Gordon
2014	Mirko Caballero	Dylan Duregger	Corbin Miley
2015	Innis Gallagher	Noah Wheeler	Domingo Jones
2016	Elliot Wiecek	Colin Duffy	Anthony Lesik
2017	Lucas Oddi	Quinn O'Francia	Jack Felix
2018	Brody Rexroad	Ty Picker	Oscar Baudrand
2019	Hugo Hoyer	Lucas Tillery	Zachary Hammer
2020	Auggie Chi	Lucas Tillery	Declan Osgood
2021	Cruz Padilla	Landers Gaydosh	James Burt
2022	Theodor Schermann	Logan Zhang	tBecket Hsin
2023	Banlu Rogaway	Logan Zhang	Arief Nagara
2024	Bayes Wilder	Landon Lewis	Jackson Day

=== Female Youth C ===
Year	Gold	Silver	Bronze
2011	Margo Hayes	Isabelle Goodacre	Claire Buhrfiend
2012	Sidney Trinidad	Melina Costanza	Cierra Graham
2013	Ashima Shiraishi	Stella Noble	Natalia Grossman
2014	Ashima Shiraishi	Brooke Raboutou	Isabel Barrientos
2015	Lauren Berry	Mia Manson	Tesla Mitchell
2016	Jessica Fecanin	Campbell Sarinopoulos	Marielle Horstmann
2017	Campbell Sarinopoulos	Olivia Kosanovich	Lydia Dolan
2018	Olivia Kosanovich	Oceana Carter	Meera Krishnan
2019	Maggie Carter	Anna Kelley (Evangelina Briggs FN)	Alina Albert
2020	Lucy Drury	Stella Blackwell	Analise Van Hoang
2021	Shae McCarl	Analise Van Hoang	Jojo Chi
2022	Lucy Crissman	Abigail Schlotterback	Selene Nicol
2023	KhadijaMagali Suleman	Evie Albrecht	Lily Tsai
2024	Marlowe LeMaire	Isabel Patajo	Madeleine Van Hoang

=== Male Youth D ===
Year	Gold	Silver	Bronze
2011	Mirko Caballero	Joe Goodacre	Lukas Strauss-Wise
2012	Mirko Caballero	Joe Goodacre	Clay Gordon
2013	Nathaniel Surma	Dylan Duregger	Colin Duffy
2014	Colin Duffy	Jason Wills	Ethan Rogers
2015	Lucas Oddi	Leo Costanza	Samuel Adams
2016	*Oscar Baudrand	Emmanuel Derima	Vail Everett
2017	Lucas Tillery	Augustine Chi	Hugo Hoyer
2018	Hugo Hoyer	Lucas Tillery	Declan Osgood
2019	Cruz Padilla	Nathaniel Perullo	James Burt
2020	Logan Zhang	Landers Gaydosh	Colton Emerson
2021	USAC Discontinued D National Championships		

=== Female Youth D ===
Year	Gold	Silver	Bronze
2011	Ashima Shiraishi	Brooke Raboutou	Lauren Bair
2012	Ashima Shiraishi	Lauren Bair	Natalia Grossman
2013	Mia Manson	Phoebe Dolan	Charlotte Howell
2014	Jessica Fecanin	Campbell Sarinopoulos	Phoebe Wong
2015	Campbell Sarinopoulos	Sophie Volchenboum	Sophia Hoermann
2016	Olivia Kosanovich	Julia De La Paz	Meera Krishnan
2017	Julia de la Paz	Maggie Carter	Lilly Czerwinski
2018	Sienna Perez	Olivia Long	Anna Kelley
2019	Analise Van Hoang	Kestrel Pikiewicz	Noemie Nguyen
2020	Joyce Yang	KhadijaMagali Suleman	Evie Albrecht
2021	USAC Discontinued D National Championships		

== Youth lead ==
=== Male Junior ===
Year	Gold	Silver	Bronze
2004	Zeb Engberg	Alex Honnold	Zach Levitt
2005	Zeb Engberg	Paul Wallace	Daniel Mills
2012	Owen Graham	Shane Puccio	Andy Lamb
2013	Dylan Barks	Josh Levin	Dominic Labarge
2014	Sean Bailey	Ben Isaac Tresco	Dominic Labarge
2015	Nathaniel Coleman	Sean Bailey	Ben Isaac Tresco
2016	Brian Huang	Nathaniel Coleman	Jesse Grupper
2017	Drew Ruana	Sean Bailey	Ben Isaac Tresco
2018	Bobby Taft-Pittman	Zach Galla	John Brock
2019	Stefan Fellner	Clay Gordon	Derek New
2020	Not held	n/a	n/a
2021	Connor Herson	Zander Waller	Cody Stevenson
2022	Sergey Lakhno	Zander Waller	Ellis Ernsberger
2023	Sergey Lakhno	Graham Owens	Josh Greenbaum
2024	Adam Shahar	Dillon Countryman	Vail Everett

=== Female Junior ===
Year	Gold	Silver	Bronze
2004	Alice Braginsky	Sydney McNair	Jessa Goebel
2005	Chelsea Rude	Sarah Broun	Sydney McNair
2012	Michaela Kiersch	Cicada Jenerik	Shannon Lochridge
2013	Delaney Miller	Michaela Kiersch	Alexa Nazarian
2014	Delaney Miller	Kyra Condie	Zoe Steinberg
2015	Kyra Condie	Samantha Scharenberg	Victoria Clarke
2016	Margo Hayes	Grace McKeehan	Claire Buhrfiend
2017	Claire Buhrfiend	Tori Perkins	Melina Costanza
2018	Melina Costanza	Bimini Horstmann	Maya Madere
2019	Natalia Grossman	Lauren Bair	Jenny Jiang
2020	Not held	n/a	n/a
2021	Quinn Mason	Jillian Gerlitz	Emily Herdic
2022	Kylie Cullen	Marielle Horstmann	Julia Duffy
2023	Norah Chi	Ava Kovtunovich	Olivia Ma
2024	Ava Kovtunovich	Ella Fisher	Kaitlyn Bone

=== Male Youth A ===
Year	Gold	Silver	Bronze
2004	Paul Wallace	Patrick Luther	Zach Lerner
2005	Daniel Woods	Jon Cardwell	Carlo Traversi
2013	Nicholas Bradley	Sean Bailey	Connor Everton
2014	Jesse Grupper	Solomon Barth	Nicholas Bradley
2015	Rudolph Ruana	Benjamin Hanna	Kai Lightner
2016	Bobby Taft-Pittman	Joseph Catama	Lucas Kepl
2017	Ross Fulkerson	Zach Galla	Stefan Fellner
2018	Clay Gordon	Ross Fulkerson	Stefan Fellner
2019	Colin Duffy	Zander Waller	Conor Herson
2020	Not held	n/a	n/a
2021	Gavin Albright	Graham Owens	Sergey Lakhno
2022	Dillon Countryman	Nathan Sato	Brenden Beauchamp
2023	Declan Osgood	Vail Everett	Nathan Sato

=== Female Youth A ===
Year	Gold	Silver	Bronze
2004	Kasia Pietras	Stephanie Outland	Victoria Guido
2005	Sierra Crane	Alex Johnson	Kasia Pietras
2013	Kyra Condie	Chloe Laberge	Samantha Scharenberg
2014	Margarita Marsanova	Grace Mckeehan	Margo Hayes
2015	Margo Hayes	Claire Buhrfeind	Melina Costanza
2016	Bimini Horstmann	Sidney Trinidad	Melina Costanza
2017	Ashima Shiraishi	Jenny Jiang	Isabel Barrientos
2018	Emma Palmer	Natalia Grossman	Sienna Kopf
2019	Emma Grace Lehmann	Quinn Mason	Emily Herdic
2020	Not held	n/a	n/a
2021	Norah Chi	Sophia Hoermann	Callie Close
2022	Ella Fisher	Mira Capicchioni	Sovarae Sanders
2023	Zoe Yi	Ella Fisher	Alina Albert

=== Male Youth B ===
Year	Gold	Silver	Bronze
2004	Daniel Woods	Jon Cardwell	Andrew Rothner
2005	Grady Bagwell	Brian Antheunisse	Matt Fultz
2013	Kai Lightner	Rudolph Ruana	Benjamin Hanna
2014	Kai Lightner	Rudolph Ruana	Emmanuel Quintana
2015	Clay Gordon	Devin Wong	Lucas Kepl
2016	Devin Hammonds	Ross Fulkerson	Clay Gordon
2017	Colin Duffy	Connor Herson	Zander Waller
2018	Connor Herson	Colin Duffy	Zander Waller
2019	Lucas Oddi	Oliver Kuang	Leo Costanza
2020	Not held	n/a	n/a
2021	Hugo Hoyer	Dillon Countryman	Declan Osgood
2022	Hugo Hoyer	Auggie Chi	Hunter Hering
2023	Bryce Nix	Beckett Hsin	Cruz Padilla

=== Female Youth B ===
Year	Gold	Silver	Bronze
2004	Autumn Duke	Elizabeth Broun	Meagan Martin
2005	Tiffany Hensley	Marah Bragdon	Paige Claassen
2013	Claire Buhrfeind	Margo Hayes	Margarita Marsanova
2014	Sidney Trinidad	Melina Costanza	Bimini Horstmann
2015	Ashima Shiraishi	Brooke Raboutou	Lauren Bair
2016	Ashima Shiraishi	Brooke Raboutou	Sami Singleton
2017	Sami Singleton	Dinah Marcuson	Allie Nishi
2018	Alex Plotnikoff	Matti Dennis	Elle McDonald
2019	Norah Chi	Olivia Ma	Matti Dennis
2020	Not held	n/a	n/a
2021	Anastasia Sanders	Ella Fisher	Joselyn Toyoda
2022	Anastasia Sanders	Analise Van Hoang	Zoe Yi
2023	Claire Larson	Analise Van Hoang	Alexandra Inghilterra

=== Male Youth C ===
Year	Gold	Silver	Bronze
2004	Matt Fultz	Brian Anthenisse	Benjamin Hoberg
2005	William Butcher	Austin Boze	Matt Danford
2012	Kai Lightner	Drew Ruana	Eli Frankel
2013	Ross Fulkerson	Devin Hammonds	Sam Mcqueen
2014	Clay Gordon	Ross Fulkerson	Joe Goodacre
2015	Colin Duffy	Elliot Wiecek	Zander Waller
2016	Colin Duffy	Elliot Wiecek	Connor Herson
2017	Lucas Oddi	Oscar Baudrand	Isaac Leff
2018	*Oscar Baudrand	Adam Shahar	Graham Owens
2019	Auggie Chi	Hugo Hoyer	Lucas Tillery
2020	Not held	n/a	n/a
2021	Cruz Padilla	Cozmo Rothfork	Landers Gaydosh
2022	Landers Gaydosh	Becket Hsin	Logan Zhang
2023	Logan Zhang	Bayes Wilder	Banlu Rogaway

=== Female Youth C ===
Year	Gold	Silver	Bronze
2004	Marah Bragdon	Tiffany Hensley	Sasha DiGiulian
2005	Sasha DiGiulian	Chauncenia Cox	Francesca Metcalf
2012	Sidney Trinidad	Cierra Graham	Bimini Horstmann
2013	Chloe Massenat	Stella Noble	Ruby Huie
2014	Stella Noble	Lauren Bair	Emma Palmer
2015	Jessica Fecanin	Quinn Mason	Marielle Horstmann
2016	Alex Plotnikoff	Dinah Marcuson	Matti Dennis
2017	Norah Chi	Olivia Ma	Shyanne Williams
2018	Shyanne Williams	Alina Albert	Meera Krishnan
2019	Anastasia Sanders	Alina Albert	Sienna Perez
2020	Not held	n/a	n/a
2021	Analise van Hoang	Shae McCarl	Kestrel Pikiewicz
2022	Maya Ene	KhadijaMagali (KM) Suleman	Joyce Yang
2023	Maya Ene	KhadijaMagali (KM) Suleman	Evie Albrecht
2024	Leina Okamoto	Kalaya Lucas	Marlowe LeMaire

=== Male Youth D ===
Year	Gold	Silver	Bronze
2004	Joshua Levin	Julian Bautista	Michael Beyer
2005	Joshua Levin	Andy Lamb	Jeremy Lack
2012	Joe Goodacre	Clay Gordon	Devin Wong
2013	Colin Duffy	Victor Baudrand	Jason Wills
2014	Colin Duffy	Zander Waller	Ethan Rogers
2015	Lucas Tillery	Lucas Oddi	Joshua Gerhardt
2016	*Oscar Baudrand	Hugo Hoyer	Calvin Cha
2017	Lucas Tillery	Calvin Cha	Hugo Hoyer
2018	Auggie Chi	Declan Osgood	Hugo Hoyer
2019	Cruz Padilla	Wilson Whitley	Cozmo Rothfork
2020	Not held	n/a	n/a
2021	USAC Discontinued D National Championships		

=== Female Youth D ===
Year	Gold	Silver	Bronze
2004	Cicada Jenerik	Francesca Metcalf	Alyse Dietel
2005	Cicada Jenerik	Laurel Shimamura	Hunter Schumaker
2012	Stella Noble	Natalia Grossman	Lauren Bair
2013	Mia Manson	Sami Singleton	Rowen Villamil
2014	Alex Plotnikoff	Jessica Fecanin	Campbell Sarinopoulos
2015	Matti Dennis	Lydia Dolan	Anna Von Dungen
2016	Shyanne Williams	Olivia Kosanovich	Meera Krishnan
2017	Maggie Carter	Julia de la Paz	Meera Krishnan
2018	Zoe Yi	Kestrel Pikiewicz	Ella Gelling-Zurek
2019	Analise van Hoang	Jojo Chi	Noemie Nguyen
2020	Not held	n/a	n/a
2021	USAC Discontinued D National Championships		

== Youth speed ==
=== Male Junior ===
Year	Gold	Silver	Bronze
2013	Thomas Pitzel	Ryan Strickland	Josh Levin
2014	Thomas Pitzel	Dominic Labarge	Jacob Wilbur
2015	John Brosler	Brendan Mitchell	Kirby Coggins
2016	John Brosler	Ben Hammer	Luke Muehring
2017	Max Hammer	Michael Finn-Henry	Luke Muehring
2018	Noah Bratschi	Michael Finn-Henry	Max Hammer
2019	Joe Goodacre	Noah Bratschi	Nicholas Montella
2020	Not held	n/a	n/a
2021	Vincent Lee	Darren Skolnik	Micah Liss
2022	Zachary Palmer	Micah Liss	Ben Jennings
2023	Ben Jennings	Micah Feller	Silas Chang

=== Female Junior ===
Year	Gold	Silver	Bronze
2013	Delaney Miller	Dana Riddle	Alexa Nazarian
2014	Danielle Rogan	Jacquelyn Wu	Kyra Condie
2015	Kayla Lieuw	Kyra Condie	Megan Carr
2016	Amanda Wooten	Claire Buhrfeind	Grace McKeehan
2017	Amanda Wooten	Piper Kelly	Grace McKeehan
2018	Piper Kelly	Chloe Massenat	Audrey Miller
2019	Lauren Bair	Natalia Grossman	Audrey Johnson
2020	Not held	n/a	n/a
2021	Emma Hunt	Sienna Kopf	Emma Wetsel
2022	Callie Close	Kiara Pellicane-Hart	Kylie Cullen
2023	Isis Rothfork	Callie Close	Sonia Gutierrez

=== Male Youth A ===
Year	Gold	Silver	Bronze
2013	John Brosler	Collier Skinn	Brendan Mitchell
2014	John Brosler	Michael Retoff	Jake Criss
2015	Max Hammer	Michael Retoff	Luke Muehring
2016	Noah Bratschi	Gentry Cole	Drew Ruana
2017	Noah Bratschi	Luke Rodley	Griffin Barros-King
2018	Jordan Fishman	Joe Goodacre	Darren Skolnik
2019	Jordan Fishman	Joshua Muehring	Ethan Freudenheim
2020	Not held	n/a	n/a
2021	James Roberts	Ardch Intrachupongse	Oliver Kuang
2022	Dillon Countryman	Samuel Watson	Skyler Mengerink
2023	Michael Hom	Skyler Mengerink	Zachary Hammer

=== Female Youth A ===
Year	Gold	Silver	Bronze
2013	Megan Carr	Kyra Condie	Kayla Lieuw
2014	Claire Buhrfeind	Grace Mckeehan	Kayla Lieuw
2015	Erica Meister	Claire Buhrfeind	Grace Mckeehan
2016	Jenna Wang	Sidney Trinidad	Ariana Mathews
2017	Arabella Jariel	Ariana Mathews	Amanda Brownstein
2018	Mia Bawendi	Amanda Brownstein	Sienna Kopf
2019	Emma Hunt	Mia Bawendi	Kiara Pellicane-Hart
2020	Not held	n/a	n/a
2021	Callie Close	Olivia Ma	Norah Chi
2022	Sophia Curcio	Kaitlyn Bone	Olivia Ma
2023	Lily Nguyen	Liberty Runnels	Sophia Curcio

=== Male Youth B ===
Year	Gold	Silver	Bronze
2013	Michael Retoff	Brandon Lieuw	Nicholas Becker
2014	Max Hammer	Matthew Nunes	Gentry Cole
2015	Noah Bratschi	Eric Brem	Matthew Nunes
2016	Clay Gordon	Luke Rodley	Joshua Muehring
2017	Jordan Fishman	Joshua Muehring	Darren Skolnik
2018	Anthony Lesik	Ellis Ernsberger	Ethan Freudenheim
2019	Quinn O'Francia	Oliver Kuang	Silas Chang
2020	Not held	n/a	n/a
2021	Richard Li	Zach Hammer	Sam Watson
2022	Logan Schlecht	Michael Hom	Auggie Chi
2023	Logan Schlecht	Zaden Rogers	Declan Calfy

=== Female Youth B ===
Year	Gold	Silver	Bronze
2013	Claire Buhrfeind	Sidney Trinidad	Grace Mckeehan
2014	Sidney Trinidad	Jenna Wang	Bimini Horstmann
2015	Jenna Tseng	Arabella Jariel	Jamie Dunlavy
2016	Lauren Bair	Arabella Jariel	Brooke Raboutou
2017	Mia Bawendi	Kiara Pellicane-Hart	Sienna Kopf
2018	Emma Hunt	Callie Close	Kiara Pellicane-Hart
2019	Callie Close	Olivia Ma	Oceana Carter
2020	Not held	n/a	n/a
2021	Sophia Curcio	Sienna Perez	Anastasia Sanders
2022	Lily Nguyen	Jojo Chi	Micaela Patajo
2023	Victoria DSouza	Emiko Takeuchi	Jojo Chi

=== Male Youth C ===
Year	Gold	Silver	Bronze
2013	Joe Goodacre	Matthew Nunes	Matthew Grossman
2014	Corbin Miley	Spencer Kapayo	Joe Goodacre
2015	Chad Test	Colin Duffy	Luke Davison
2016	Ethan Freudenheim	Colin Duffy	Connor Herson
2017	Oliver Kuang	Quinn O'Francia	Oscar Baudrand
2018	Zach Hammer	Silas Chang	Vail Everett
2019	Lucas Tillery	Zach Hammer	Vail Everett
2020	Not held	n/a	n/a
2021	Cozmo Rothfork	Reeder Smith	Cruz Padilla
2022	Mitchell Boyer	Braxton Birkenfeld	Noah Kim
2023	Noah Kim	Austin Bock	Logan Zhang

=== Female Youth C ===
Year	Gold	Silver	Bronze
2013	Riley Ogier	Lauren Bair	Jenna Tseng
2014	Lauren Bair	Natalia Grossman	Olivia Ogier
2015	Jessica Fecanin	Kiara Pellicane-Hart	Phoebe Dolan
2016	Jessica Fecanin	Nicole (Coco) Mar	Kiara Pellicane-Hart
2017	Nicole (Coco) Mar	Oceana Carter	Matti Dennis
2018	Olivia Kosanovich	Olivia Ma	Oceana Carter
2019	Alina Albert	Sienna Perez	Jordan Carr
2020	Not held	n/a	n/a
2021	Jojo Chi	Yealiya Southern	Emiko Takeuchi
2022	Joyce Yang	Khadija Suleman	Evie Albrecht
2023	Evie Albrecht	Zoe Chi	Kaitlyn Weaver

=== Male Youth D ===
Year	Gold	Silver	Bronze
2013	Chad Test	Joshua Muehring	Ethan Rogers
2014	Colin Duffy	Zander Waller	Ethan Rogers
2015	Leo Costanza	Lucas Tillery	Cedar Holden
2016	Owen Bales	Calvin Cha	Dillon Countryman
2017	Dillon Countryman	Emmanuel Derima	Vail Everett
2018	Lucas Tillery	Michael Cullen	Auggie Chi
2019	Liam Anderson	William Eaton	Cozmo Rothfork
2020	Not held	n/a	n/a
2021	USAC Discontinued D National Championships		

=== Female Youth D ===
Year	Gold	Silver	Bronze
2013	Jessica Fecanin	Phoebe Dolan	Mia Manson
2014	Jessica Fecanin	Charlotte Howell	Nicole (Coco) Mar
2015	Nicole (Coco) Mar	Zoe Lang	Campbell Sarinopoulos
2016	Oceana Carter	Ella Mcritchie	Alila Allen
2017	Maggie Carter	Julia de la Paz	Alina Albert
2018	Carly Alba	Sienna Perez	Kaliina Yates
2019	Jojo Chi	Noemie Nguyen	Yealiya Southern
2020	Not held	n/a	n/a
2021	USAC Discontinued D National Championships		

== See also ==
- International Federation of Sport Climbing
- IFSC Climbing World Cup
- IFSC Climbing World Championships
- IFSC Climbing World Youth Championships
