= Michaela Kiersch =

American rock climber

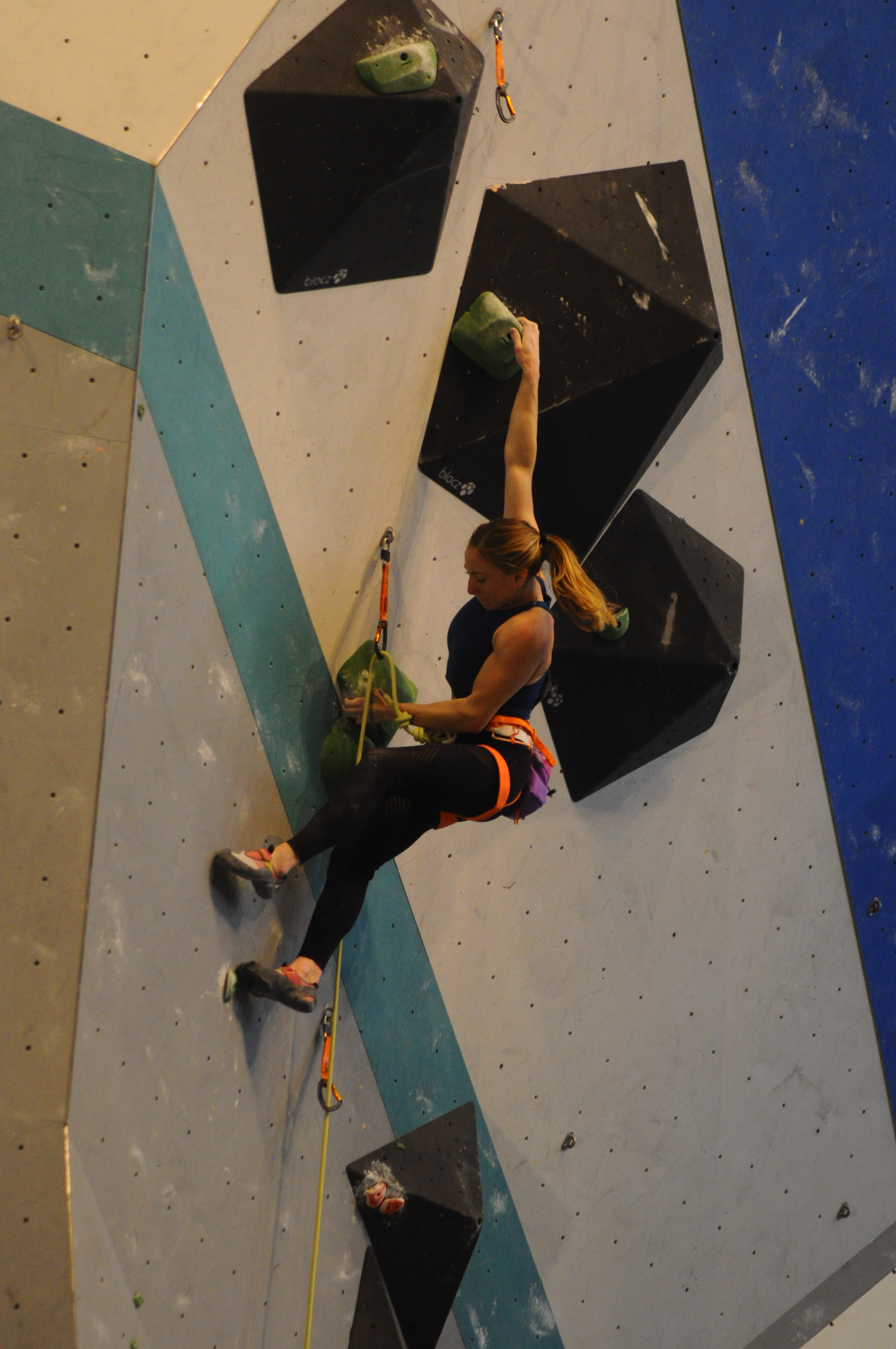
- Kiersch competing in the semifinal of the 2019 US Open National Championships

Personal information
- Born: December 13, 1994 (age 31) Chicago, Illinois, US
- Education: DePaul University (Degree); Rush University (Doctorate, 2022)
- Occupations: Rock climber, Occupational therapist

Climbing career
- Type of climber: Bouldering; Sport climbing; Competition climbing
- Ape index: 3 in (8 cm)
- Highest grade: Redpoint: 9a+ (5.15a); Onsight/Flash: 8b+ (5.14a); Bouldering: 8C (V15)
- First ascents: Mad Lib (9a, 2025)
- Known for: First woman to have climbed at both 9a+ (5.15a) and 8C (V15); First American woman to do a first free ascent at 9a (5.14d)
- Updated on 23 August 2026

Michaela Kiersch (born 1994) is an American rock climber and competition climber from Chicago, Illinois who is known for being both one of the strongest female sport climbers in the world, and also one of the strongest female boulder climbers in the world.

== Competition climbing ==
In her youth, Kiersch was active in competition climbing and won US national events for lead and for bouldering in the youth category, and placed 5th at the IFSC Youth World Championships. She was a member of the US National Team for lead, boulder and speed climbing events and medaled in the national lead finals. At 15, she ranked 22nd on her full international debut at the 2010 IFSC Boulder World Cup, and the following year, placed 18th in an IFSC Lead World Cup event, however Kiersch decided to focus on her academic studies, on outdoor climbing, and on the training needed for outdoor climbing, which she was particularly interested in given her academic studies.

Kiersch continued to take part in competitions on natural surfaces, and won the female category in the international outdoor bouldering competition, the Hueco Rock Rodeo, in 2019 and in 2024.

== Rock climbing ==
Kiersch came to national attention by making the first female free ascent (FFFA) of notable American sport-climbing routes, including The Golden Ticket (2016) and Necessary Evil (2018), both at 5.14c (8c+), and Super Tweak (2021), America's first 5.14b (8c). In September 2021, Kiersch came to international prominence by making the second female ascent of Dreamcatcher, a famous 9a (5.14d) graded sport-climb in Squamish, British Columbia, and her first ascent at the grade.

During 2022, after completing her doctorate in occupational therapy, Kiersch toured Europe where she showed her bouldering skills by completing internationally notable boulder problems including New Base Line, her first 8B+ (V14), followed by Tigris SDS, also at that grade. She was noted at the time as being the only female climber that had completed both a 9a (5.14d) graded sport-climbing route and a V14 (8B+) graded boulder problem in the last twelve months.

By 2024, she became the first woman in history to have climbed both a 9a+ (5.15a) graded sport-climbing route (which she did in 2023 with La Rambla in Spain), and a 8C (V15) graded bouldering problem (which she did with Dreamtime in Switzerland, which was also the FFFA). In 2025, she became the first American female climber to complete the first free ascent (FFA) of a 9a (5.14d) graded sport-climbing route with her ascent of Mad Lib at Lone Rock Point in Vermont.

== See also ==
- Margo Hayes, American sport climber
- Katie Lamb, American boulderer
