= 2018 in sport climbing =

This article lists the main competition climbing events and their results for 2018.

== World Championships ==
Date	Location	Competition	Discipline	Men	Women
August 9 – 16	(Russia) Moscow	World Youth Championships	Junior Bouldering	(Japan) Meichi Narasaki	(United Kingdom) Hannah Slaney
August 9 – 16	(Russia) Moscow	World Youth Championships	Youth "A" Bouldering	(France) Sam Avezou	(Italy) Laura Rogora
August 9 – 16	(Russia) Moscow	World Youth Championships	Youth "B" Bouldering	(Japan) Rei Kawamata	(Japan) Natsuki Tanii
August 9 – 16	(Russia) Moscow	World Youth Championships	Junior Lead	(Japan) Meichi Narasaki	(Slovenia) Vita Lukan
August 9 – 16	(Russia) Moscow	World Youth Championships	Youth "A" Lead	(Japan) Hidemasa Nishida	(United States) Brooke Raboutou
August 9 – 16	(Russia) Moscow	World Youth Championships	Youth "B" Lead	(United States) Colin Duffy	(Japan) Natsuki Tanii
August 9 – 16	(Russia) Moscow	World Youth Championships	Junior Speed	(Italy) Gian Luca Zodda	(Russia) Ekaterina Barashchuk
August 9 – 16	(Russia) Moscow	World Youth Championships	Youth "A" Speed	(Russia) Almaz Nagaev	(Poland) Natalia Kalucka
August 9 – 16	(Russia) Moscow	World Youth Championships	Youth "B" Speed	(South Korea) Jeon Ha-ram	(South Korea) Jeong Ji-min
September 6 – 16	(Austria) Innsbruck	World Championships	Bouldering	(Japan) Kai Harada	(Slovenia) Janja Garnbret
September 6 – 16	(Austria) Innsbruck	World Championships	Lead	(Austria) Jakob Schubert	(Austria) Jessica Pilz
September 6 – 16	(Austria) Innsbruck	World Championships	Speed	(Iran) Reza Alipour	(Poland) Aleksandra Rudzinska
September 6 – 16	(Austria) Innsbruck	World Championships	Combined	(Austria) Jakob Schubert	(Slovenia) Janja Garnbret

== Continental Championships ==
Date	Location	Competition	Discipline	Men	Women
November 7 – 11	(Japan) Kurayoshi	Asian Championships	Bouldering	(Japan) Meichi Narasaki	(Japan) Futaba Ito
November 7 – 11	(Japan) Kurayoshi	Asian Championships	Lead	(Japan) Kokoro Fujii	(South Korea) Jain Kim
November 7 – 11	(Japan) Kurayoshi	Asian Championships	Speed	(Indonesia) Alfian Muhammad	(Indonesia) Sari Agustina
November 7 – 11	(Japan) Kurayoshi	Asian Championships	Combined	(Japan) Meichi Narasaki	(Japan) Akiyo Noguchi
November 21 – 26	(Ecuador) Guayaquil	Pan American Championships	Bouldering	(Canada) Zach Richardson	(United States) Sierra Blair-Coyle
November 21 – 26	(Ecuador) Guayaquil	Pan American Championships	Lead	(United States) Kai Lightner	(United States) Ashima Shiraishi
November 21 – 26	(Ecuador) Guayaquil	Pan American Championships	Speed	(United States) John Brosler	(United States) Piper Kelly

== Others ==
Date	Location	Competition	Discipline	Men	Women
November 16 – 18	(China) Guangzhou	China Open	Bouldering	(Japan) Yoshiyuki Ogata	(Austria) Jessica Pilz
November 16 – 18	(China) Guangzhou	China Open	Lead	(Slovenia) Domen Škofic	(Austria) Jessica Pilz
November 16 – 18	(China) Guangzhou	China Open	Speed	(China) Zhong Qixin	(Poland) Aleksandra Rudzinska
