= Hueco Rock Rodeo =

Bouldering competition in Texas, US

The Hueco Rock Rodeo is a bouldering competition held annually in February at Hueco Tanks State Historic Site in the extremities of El Paso, Texas. It attracts professional rock climbers from around the world. The proceeds go toward conservation and access. The competition was not the original intention of the event but with the growing popularity of bouldering, it has become a difficult competition to win. After more than 20 years it is a mainstay in the climbing community and is a festival as well as a competition.

== History ==
The following are excerpts from Rock and Ice magazine by Melissa Strong on the early history of the event:

"In 1989 the El Paso Climbers Club (EPCC) started the Rock Rodeo before any restrictions came into place at Hueco Tanks. Dave Head remembers fondly some of the early Rodeos: “We would get Croakies and give them out—then the next few weeks you would see all of the people at Hueco wearing their Croakies. It was simple back then. There were trophies, velvet Elvis posters and the most injured climber got a bottle of tequila.” For six years the Rodeo continued to attract up to 150 participants including Dale Goddard, Hans Florine and Matt Samet. There were some changes in the Rodeo’s format because of ongoing access issues due to over use and vandalized pictographs, but the Rodeo went on still hosted by the EPCC and held at Pete’s. In 1995, due to continuing problems, the Rodeo was suspended. In 1996 the Rodeo continued, but was called the 7th Rock Rodeo. The 8th and 9th Rock Rodeo occurred before the Public Use Plan (PUP) was put into place in 1998. After the PUP went into effect, the Hueco Rock Rodeo tradition was put on hold in 1999, 2000, 2001, and 2002. In 2003 Rob Rice appealed to the park and was able to put on the 10th annual Rock Rodeo–the first Rodeo hosted by the Rock Ranch."

== Format ==
The format has changed over the 20+ years of competition but the modern era standards (2012–present) are fairly consistent.

Each year the event organizers dictate a location where the separate categories will compete. The location changes every year.

Typically there are five main categories:

- Recreational: V0-V4
- Intermediate: V3-V7
- Advanced: V5-V10
- Masters (ages 40+): V0-V14
- Open:V7-V14

In previous years the "Open" category was referred to as the "Mutant" category.

In the specified location a scorecard containing a list of boulder problems is given to the competitors. From this list the competitors must successfully climb the boulder problem without falling and have two witnesses sign the scorecard to receive the allocated point value for the climb. Attempts are recorded in the event of a tie. The top 6 problems are taken as the total score.

Scores for each boulder problem are related to the "V-Scale". V7 may equal 700pts. So if a competitor has an overall score of 6000 then they may have climbed 6 V10 boulders.

The coveted Open category is one of the most competitive with the winner receiving a rodeo style belt buckle, cash prize, and international recognition.

== Men's results ==
| Year | Location | Winner | Points |
|---|---|---|---|
| 2006 | ? | (United States) Matt Wilder | 6870? |
| 2007 | ? | ? | ? |
| 2008 | North & East | (United States) Kevin Jorgeson | 7200 |
| 2009 | North | (United States) Paul Robinson | 7700 |
| 2010 | East | (United States) Daniel Woods | ? |
| 2011 | East | (United States) Daniel Woods | 7400 |
| 2012 | Spur | (United States) Daniel Woods | 7600 |
| 2013 | East | (United States) Paul Robinson | 7780 |
| 2014 | Spur | (United States) Daniel Woods | 8115 |
| 2015 | West | (United States) Daniel Woods | 7170 |
| 2016 | North | (Austria) Jakob Schubert | 7710 |
| 2017 | North | (United States) Daniel Woods | 7,295 |
| 2018 | ? | (United States) Keenan Takahashi | ? |
| 2019 | North | (United States) Keenan Takahashi | ? |
| 2020 | ? | (United States) Matt Fultz | 7,705 |

== Women's results ==
| Year | Location | Winner | Points |
|---|---|---|---|
| 2006 | west buttress | (United States) Ana Burgos | 5342? |
| 2007 | ? | ? | ? |
| 2008 | ? | ? | ? |
| 2009 | North | (Canada) Thomasina Pidgeon | ? |
| 2010 | Spur | (United States) Alex Puccio | ? |
| 2011 | Spur | ? | ? |
| 2012 | Spur | (Austria) Katha Saurwein | 5900 |
| 2013 | East | (United States) Angie Payne | 2960 |
| 2014 | Spur | (Germany) Jule Wurm | 6100 |
| 2015 | West | (Norway) Maria Sandbu | 3800 |
| 2016 | North | (United States) Alex Puccio | 6510 |
| 2017 | North | (United States) Kyra Condie | 3,910 |
| 2018 | ? | (United States) ? | ? |
| 2019 | North | (United States) Michaela Kiersch | ? |
| 2020 | ? | (United States) Michaela Tracy | 5,070 |

== Masters' Results ==
| Year | Location | Winner | Points |
|---|---|---|---|
| 2014 | ? | (United States) Ty Foose | 3,360 |
| 2015 | West Mtn | (United States) Ty Foose | ? |
| 2016 | North Mtn | (United States) Jay Bone | 46 |
| 2017 | ? | (United States) Ty Foose | ? |
| 2018 | ? | (United States) Jason Syesta | ? |
| 2019 | East Mtn | (United States) Ty Foose | 12,489 |
| 2020 | ? | (United States) Joe Czerwinski | 4,355 |
