= Alex Johnson (climber) =

American rock climber (born 1989)

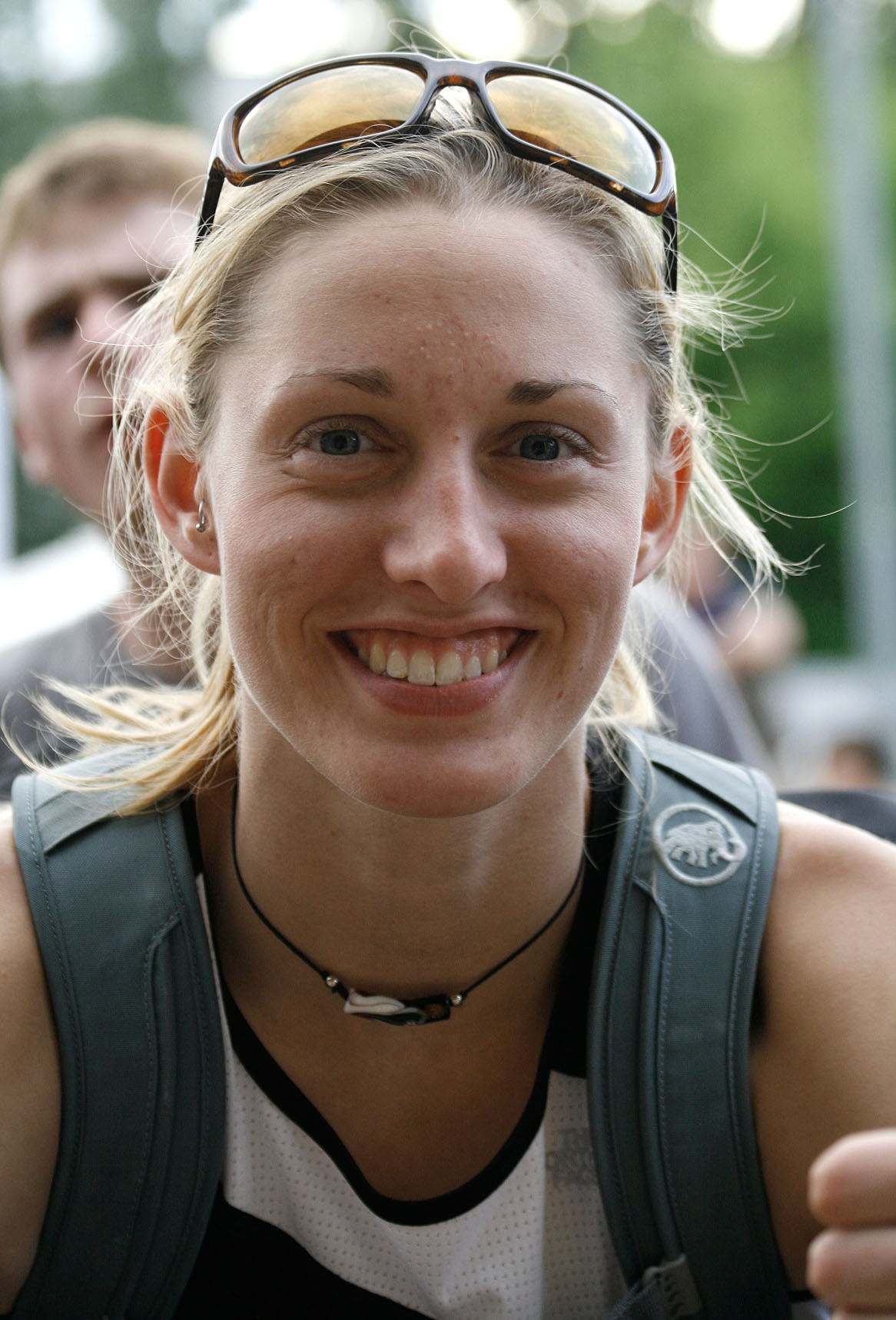
- Alex Johnson at the 2010 Bouldering World Cup in Vienna

Personal information
- Born: April 3, 1989 (age 37) Hudson, Wisconsin, U.S.
- Occupations: Professional Rock Climber, Rock Climbing Coach
- Height: 5 ft 9 in (175 cm)
- Weight: 132 lb (60 kg)
- Website: www.alexjohnsonclimbing.com

Climbing career
- Type of climber: Bouldering, Competition bouldering
- Highest grade: Bouldering: V14 (8B+)
- Known for: Won two stages of the Bouldering World Cup series
Medal record
Women's competition climbing
Representing United States
World Cup
Gold medal – first place	2008 Vail	Bouldering
Gold medal – first place	2010 Greifensee	Bouldering
Silver medal – second place	2009 Vail	Bouldering
Silver medal – second place	2010 Sheffield	Bouldering

Alexandra Johnson (born April 3, 1989) is an American rock climber who specializes in bouldering and who has made numerous first female ascents of notable boulders, including Clear Blue Skies V12 (8A+) in Colorado, and Book of Nightmares V12 (8A+) and Lethal Design V12 (8A+) in Red Rocks. Her highest rated boulder send, as of 2022, was The Swarm at grade V14 (8B+) in Bishop. In competition bouldering, she won the overall American Bouldering Series in 2009, and has twice won individual stages in the annual IFSC Climbing World Cup series in bouldering.

== Early life ==
Alex Johnson was born and raised in Hudson, Wisconsin. She began climbing in 1997, won her first American Bouldering Series Youth Climbing National Championship in 2002 at age twelve, and won the Adult National Championships in 2003 at age thirteen. She continued to win professional bouldering competitions throughout her childhood, but in her last two years of high school she turned away from climbing to focus her energy on track, and in 2007, she won the Wisconsin State Championships in pole vaulting. This win helped her earn a track and field scholarship to attend Minnesota State University.

== Climbing career ==
=== Competition climbing ===
In 2008, she won the first stage of the annual IFSC Climbing World Cup series for bouldering that was held in America (Anna Stöhr won the overall 2008 World Cup for bouldering. After her first World Cup stage win, Johnson left Minnesota State University and moved to Colorado to focus on bouldering. She won the overall 2009 American Bouldering Series (ABS 10), and took second to Alex Puccio in another 2009 World Cup stage (Akiyo Noguchi won the overall 2009 Bouldering World Cup), but won a second World Cup stage in 2010 (Akiyo Noguchi also won the overall 2010 Bouldering World Cup).

She then moved to Europe to train with the Austrian team, but after a string of disappointing finishes in 2011 and a bout of debilitating depression, Johnson returned to the US. Between 2012 and 2015, she placed well in several national and international competitions, including first place at the UBC Pro Tour Championships in 2012 and second place, again to Alex Puccio, in the American Bouldering Series National Championships. After a three-year break from competition climbing, during which time she coached, Johnson returned in 2019 as part of a bid for the 2020 Olympics.

=== Bouldering ===
Although Johnson is best known as a competition climber, she has increasingly focused on outdoor climbing, and she has claimed the first female ascent of several notable outdoor problems, including Luminance, Whispers of Wisdom, Across the Tracks, Progressive Guy, Vigilante, Stake Your Claim, Diesel Power, Beyond Life, Dark Horse, Seek and Destroy, and Prune Tang at the V10 grade, Stand and Deliver, Drive On, Divergence, Gypsies, Tramps and Thieves, and Double Stack at V11, and Clear Blue Skies, The Mystery, Diaphanous Sea, and Lethal Design, and Book of Nightmares at V12. She has also done a successful ascent of “The Swarm” at V13/14. Like many women who have claimed first female ascents of difficult problems, Johnson faced controversy and the threat of a downgrade after many of her V12 first female ascents.

== Personal life ==
In 2018, Alex came out publicly as LGBTQ+ and advocates for equality in sports and the outdoors. Her coming out story combined with her send of The Swarm culminated in a feature length film on the 2022 Reel Rock Film Tour. She is in a relationship with fellow professional climber Melina Costanza.

== World Cup Medals ==
Season	Gold	Silver	Bronze	Total
2008	1	0	0	1
2009	0	1	0	1
2010	1	1	0	2
Total	2	2	0	4

== See also ==
- Alex Puccio, American bouldering climber
- Angie Payne, American bouldering climber
