= Delaney Miller =

American rock climber

Personal information
- Nationality: American
- Born: April 6, 1995 (age 31) Dallas, TX
- Height: 5 ft 2 in (157 cm)

Climbing career
- Type of climber: Sport climbing; Bouldering; Competition climbing

Delaney Miller (born April 6, 1995) is an American former professional rock climber who specialised in competition climbing and sport climbing. In 2013, Miller took second to Sasha DiGiulian in "The Heist", a bouldering competition by and for women. She placed second in the 2013 Psicocomp to DiGiulian, and placed second again in 2014 to Claire Buhrfeind. In April 2014, she beat out DiGiulian and Buhrfeind to become the Sports Climbing Series National Champion. In September 2014, she redpointed the 9a (5.14d) graded sport-climbing route, Fat Camp, in Colorado. Miller was also a senior editor for Climbing.
