= Matty Hong =

American rock climber (born 1991)

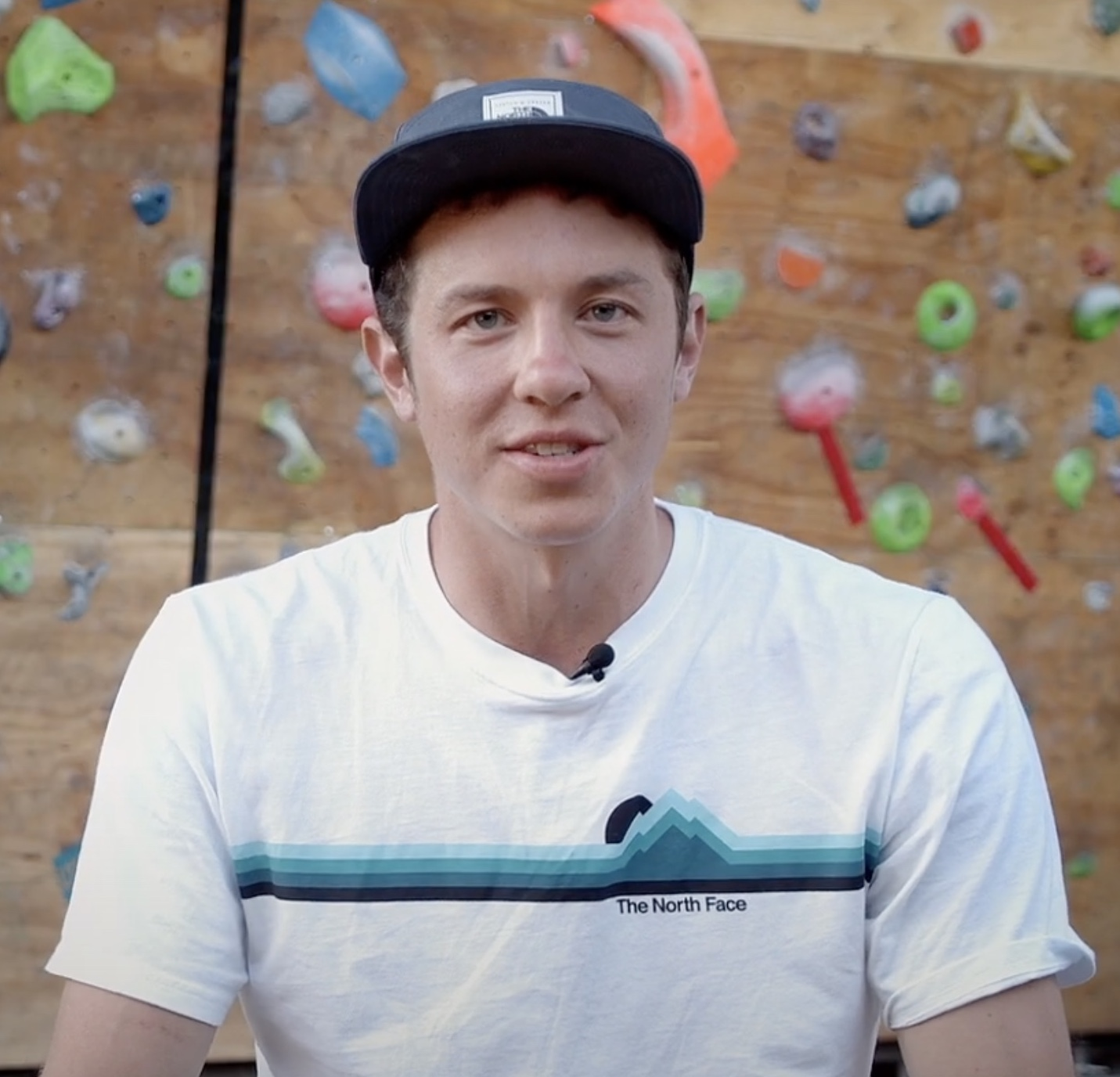
- Hong in 2019

Personal information
- Born: 4 September 1991 (age 34) Boulder, Colorado, United States
- Education: University of Colorado Boulder
- Occupations: Rock climber, film director, photographer

Climbing career
- Type of climber: Competition climbing; Sport climbing; Bouldering
- Highest grade: Onsight/Flash: 5.13a (7c+); Bouldering: V15 (8C)
- Known for: Becoming the fourth American climber to send a 5.15b (9b) route

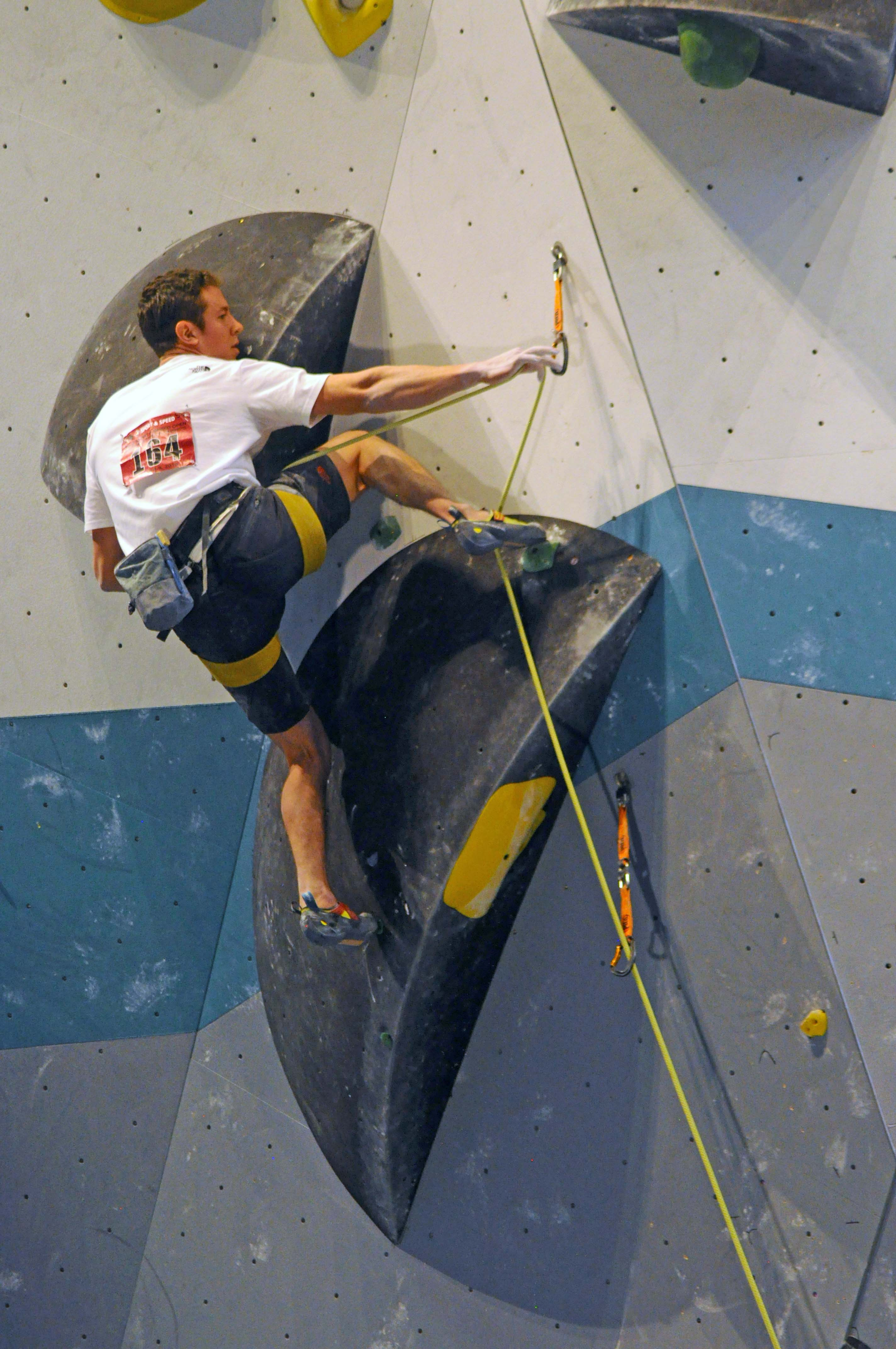
Hong competing in 2019

Matthew Jacob Hong (born September 4, 1991) is an American rock climber, filmmaker and photographer. In 2018, he became the fourth American to climb a route graded at 5.15b (9b). As a filmmaker, he directed the 2017 film Break on Through, which documented Margo Hayes completing the first-ever female ascent of a 9a+ (5.15a) graded sport climbing route, and is featured on the Reel Rock Film Tour.

== Early life and education ==
Hong was born in Boulder, Colorado in 1991. He began climbing at an early age, brought to climbing spots in Rifle Canyon as a baby by his father Steve Hong and mother Karin Budding, who were both pioneering rock climbers. He joined a climbing team in middle school and began climbing more seriously at age 15, when he climbed his first 5.13d (8b) and 5.14a (8b+) routes in Rifle.

After earning a Bachelor of Fine Arts in Film Production at the University of Colorado Boulder, Hong climbed his first 5.15a (9a+) route, Papichulo 5.15a (9a+) in Oliana, Spain, in March 2016.

== Climbing career ==
=== Sport climbing ===
In 2011, Hong recorded the first ascent of the sport climbing route, Bad Girls Club, in Rifle and in 2015, he bolted and completed his first route, La Cucaracha in Wicked Cave, also in Rifle.

In May 2018, he climbed the 5.15b (9b) graded sport climbing route, Fight or Flight, in Oliana, Spain, becoming the fourth American to climb the grade after Chris Sharma, Ethan Pringle and Daniel Woods.

In October 2021, Hong completed the second-ever ascent of Flex Luthor, first sent by Tommy Caldwell in 2003. Hong suggested the grade be revised to 5.15b (9b) from 5.15a (9a+) after multiple holds broke making the climb harder. In November 2022, Jonathan Siegrist made the third repeat of Flex Luthor and downgraded it back to 5.15a (9a+).

In May 2023, Hong made the 20th ascent of Sharma's 2001 route, Realization/Biographie 9a+ (5.15a), in Ceuse.

=== Competition climbing ===
As a competition climber, Hong competed at IFSC Climbing World Youth Championships in 2009 and 2010 in the Male Youth Junior (age 17–19) category. He has also competed in the senior climbing circuit, making the final at the 2011 IFSC Lead World Cup event in Boulder, finishing sixth.

== Notable ascents ==
=== Redpoint ===
- 5.15b (9b)
  - Fight or Flight, Oliana, Spain, 2018
  - Flex Luthor, Fortress of Solitude, Colorado, 2021.
- 5.15a (9a+)
  - Realization/Biographie, Ceuse. France, 2023.
  - La Rambla, Siurana, Spain, 2017
  - Papichulo, Oliana, Spain, 2017
  - Joe Mama, Oliana, Spain, 2017

=== First ascent ===
- 5.14d (9a)
  - Bad Girls Club, Rifle, Colorado, 2011
  - Planet Garbage (5.14d), Rifle, Colorado, 2014
  - Stocking Stuffer (5.14d), Rifle, Colorado, 2017
- 5.14c (8c+)
  - La Cucaracha, Rifle, Colorado, 2015
  - Apple Juice Flood, Red River Gorge, Kentucky, 2016
  - Sweet Tooth, Red River Gorge, Kentucky, 2016

=== Onsight ===
- 5.13a (7c+)
  - Logical Progression, El Gigante, Mexico
- 5.14b (8c)
  - Mind Control, Oliana, Catalunya

=== Bouldering ===
- V15 (8C)
  - Warrior Up, Lincoln Lake, Colorado, 2012
  - Dreamtime, Ticino, Switzerland, 2020

=== Competition climbing ===
- Sixth Place, 2011 IFSC Lead World Cup, Boulder CO

== Filmography ==
- Break on Through (2017), director, featured on Reel Rock 12
