= Paul Robinson (climber) =

American professional rock climber (born 1987)

Personal information
- Born: August 28, 1987 (age 38) New Jersey
- Occupation: Rock Climber

Climbing career
- Type of climber: Bouldering; Competition climbing
- Highest grade: Bouldering: 8C (V15)
Medal record
Men's competition climbing
Representing United States
World Cup
Bronze medal – third place	2008 Vail	Bouldering

Paul David Robinson (born August 28, 1987) is an American professional rock climber who specializes in bouldering. He has established and repeated several bouldering problems at the V15 difficulty rating, in such areas as Hueco Tanks, the Buttermilks, and Magic Wood. In 2007, Robinson became the second climber in history to successfully climb a V13 boulder problem in one attempt.

== Climbing career ==
=== Competition climbing ===
In 2007, Paul Robinson took second place at the 8th Annual American Bouldering Series (ABS) National Championships. The following year, Robinson took first place at the competition, beating Chris Sharma and Sean McColl. Later that year, he took third place at the International Federation of Sport Climbing (IFSC) Bouldering World Cup in Vail, Colorado. In 2009, Robinson competed once again in the ABS National Championships, this time taking second place behind Daniel Woods. At the IFSC Bouldering World Cup in Vail, he completed three of the four finals problems, placing him in fourth behind Kilian Fischhuber. In January 2013, Robinson took third place in the finals of the Dark Horse Series IV bouldering competition. The following June, Robinson reached the finals of the IFSC Bouldering World Cup in Vail, but was unable to finish any of the final boulders and took sixth place.

=== Bouldering ===
In August 2007, Robinson made the third ascent of Jade, a V14 bouldering problem in Rocky Mountain National Park, Colorado. Later that year, he climbed the V13 Nagual boulder in one attempt, an accomplishment known as a "flash". This made Robinson the second person to have flashed a V13, after James Pearson. The following January, Robinson claimed the second ascent of Terremer, a V15 boulder in Hueco Tanks, Texas. The problem was established by Swiss climber Fred Nicole two years earlier. At the time, it was regarded as the most challenging problem at Hueco Tanks, and Robinson described it as "the hardest boulder I have ever done so far."

On 30 March 2010, Robinson claimed the first ascent of Lucid Dreaming, a highball bouldering problem in the Buttermilks near Bishop, California. He originally proposed a grade of V16, the highest bouldering grade that had yet been assigned to a problem, but he later suggested Lucid Dreaming might be a V15. The boulder is 55 feet (17 m) from ground to top, beginning with a steep overhang and ending with a slab traversal. Much of the difficulty of the climb comes from two consecutive V12 moves near the beginning, both featuring small, technical holds. The problem was not repeated until January 2014.

During the summer of 2010, Robinson spent two months climbing in Rocklands, South Africa. His main project was the second ascent of Monkey Wedding, a V15 boulder problem first established in 2002 by Fred Nicole. Other achievements included a flash of The Amphitheater (V12), and two V14 first ascents: The Big Short and Black Eagle. Later that year, Robinson visited Magic Wood in Switzerland, where he established Il Trill, a boulder problem rated 8c on the Fontainebleau scale.

In February 2011, Robinson took the third ascent of Trip Hop, a V15 problem established by Sébastien Frigault in 2003. The following month, he claimed two V15 second ascents in Europe: The Story of Two Worlds, established in 2005 by Dave Graham, and Angama, established in 2006 by Dai Koyamada. In January 2012, Robinson established Meadowlark Lemon, a V14 sit-start variation of the V13 Meadowlark problem in Red Rock Canyon, Nevada. Later that year, he claimed the second ascent of Paint it Black, a V15 problem established in Rocky Mountain National Park by Daniel Woods.

== Filmography ==
- MVM - Volume 1 (2007)
- MVM - Volume 2 (2007)
- Dosage V (2008)
- Progression (2008)
- Rocky Mountain Highball (2010)
- Reel Rock S5 E5: The Hardest Moves (2010)
- Better Than Chocolate (2011)
- The Schengen Files (2011)
- The Swiss Account (2011)
- Welcome to the Hood (2013)
- On the Circuit (2012)
- Chasing Winter (2013)
- The Network (2013)
- Petzl Rocktrip 2014 - On the Road (2014)
- Pad Party (2014)
- Uncharted Lines (2017)

== See also ==
- Notable first free ascents
