= Allison Vest =

Canadian rock climber (born 1995)

Personal information
- Nationality: Canadian
- Born: June 26, 1995 (age 31) St. Paul, Minnesota
- Education: University of British Columbia
- Height: 5 ft 6 in (168 cm)

Climbing career
- Type of climber: Competition climbing; Bouldering; Sport climbing
- Highest grade: Bouldering: V14 (8B+) (Show Your Scars)
Medal record
Canadian Bouldering Nationals
Gold medal – first place	2018	Bouldering
Gold medal – first place	2020	Bouldering
Canadian Lead Nationals
Gold medal – first place	2019	Lead

Allison Vest (born June 26, 1995) is a Canadian rock climber known for competition climbing, bouldering and sport climbing. She won the Canadian Bouldering Nationals in 2018 and 2020. She also came first in Canadian Lead Nationals in 2019, and placed 10th in the World Beach Games in Doha, Qatar in 2019. In August 2019, Vest became the first female Canadian climber to conquer a V13 (8B) graded boulder, with The Terminator, in Squamish, British Columbia. This feat was documented in the 2020 film, The Terminator, which premiered at the Vancouver International Mountain Film Festival on March 1, 2020.

In February 2022, after taking an extended break from competition climbing, Vest became the first Canadian woman to climb a V14 (8B+) graded boulder, "Show Your Scars", in Ogden, Utah.

== Personal life ==
Born in St. Paul, Minnesota, Vest relocated to Canmore, Alberta, with her family when she was seven. She retains dual citizenship. Living in the Canadian Rockies, she began competitive climbing at age 9, and joined the Canadian National Team as a teenager.

She began her studies at the University of Alberta and transferred to the University of British Columbia in 2015 to study kinesiology. In her spare time, she was a youth team coach at the Hive Climbing Gym in Vancouver.

Since spring 2020, she has lived and trained in Salt Lake City with American climber Kyra Condie, and the pair began documenting their training on their shared TikTok account, @climbingroommates. In 2022, Vest and Condie launched the podcast "Circle Up with Allison and Kyra", covering topics including climbing, motivation, body image and mindset. She has garnered a following on social media as a result of her humorous and satirical training videos.

Vest is nicknamed "Albatross" because of her 7+ ape index. At 6 ft 1 in (1.85 m), her wingspan is 7 inches (180 mm) longer than her height (5 ft 6 in (1.68 m)).

== Canadian Nationals performance ==
CEC Women's Open Boulder and Open Lead Rankings
	Rank
2020 Open Boulder Nationals	1st
2019 Open Lead Nationals	1st
2019 Open Boulder Nationals	6th
2018 Open Boulder Nationals	1st
