= Angie Payne =

American rock climber

Personal information
- Born: November 6, 1984 (age 41) Cincinnati, Ohio, U.S.
- Education: University of Colorado Boulder
- Occupation: Professional rock climber
- Height: 5 ft 5 in (165 cm)
- Weight: 55 kg (121 lb)
- Website: angiepayneclimbing.com

Climbing career
- Type of climber: Bouldering; Competition climbing; Big wall climbing
- Highest grade: Bouldering: 8B (V13)
- Known for: first-ever female to climb an 8B (V13) boulder

Angela Payne (born November 6, 1984) is an American rock climber specializing in bouldering, who won a clean sweep of the 2003-2004 US American Bouldering Series, and who in 2010, became the first-ever female in history to climb an 8B (V13) boulder.

== Early years ==
Payne was born and raised in Cincinnati, Ohio. She began indoor sport climbing at the age of 11, and competed in a number of junior sport climbing competitions before switching to bouldering at age 15 to 16. Payne says that her early idols were Lynn Hill, and as she began to focus on bouldering, Lisa Rands. In 2003, she moved to Boulder to attend college at the University of Colorado Boulder to study veterinary science, graduating in 2010.

== Climbing career ==
=== Competition climbing ===
Aged 19, and in her first year in college, Payne won a clean sweep of all three of the American Bouldering Series 5, national championship events, (and thus became the overall ABS 5 champion), and two Professional Climbers Association (PCA) competitions, (and also the overall PCA championship), for the 2003-2004 boulder season. Payne finished second overall (2012), and third overall (2006, 2007, and 2015) in the annual US Bouldering Open National Championships (what the ABS became post-2004). Amongst other podiums and victories in individual competitions,(e.g. the 2006 SENDFEST in Salt Lake City, and the 2010 Triple Crown Series at Horse Pens 40 in Steele, Alabama), in 2013, Payne won the Hueco Rock Rodeo at Hueco Tanks, in Texas.

=== Bouldering ===
From 2004 to 2009, Payne completed the first female ascent of numerous bouldering problems graded V10 (7C+) to V12 (8A+), as well as making the third female ascent of the classic Midnight Lightning in 2004, and earning an honourable mention in Climbing magazine's 2007 Golden Piton Award for her climbs, and winning her the 2007 Everest Award for Female Boulderer of the Year, at the 2007 Teva Mountain Games (Chris Sharma won the male award). In early 2008, Payne climbed Chbalank in Hueco Tanks at V11/V12, and in September 2008, she climbed Dave Graham's European Human Being in the Rocky Mountain National Park (RMNP) at "hard" V12 (8A+) and her first V12. In February 2009, she climbed Atomic Playboy in Fontainebleau in France, another V12 (8A+). In June 2010, she climbed Clear Blue Skies, and made the first female ascent of No More Green Grasses, at Mount Blue Sky, both at grade V12 (8A+).

On August 17, 2010, Payne became the first-ever female in history to complete a confirmed 8B (V13) boulder, with her ascent of The Automator in the RMNP (Anna Stöhr would complete the second-ever female ascent of an 8B (V13) just one month later). She won a second honourable mention in Climbing magazine's 2010 Golden Piton Awards. In 2012, Payne, rock climber Ethan Pringle, and mountainer Mike Libecki went to the Kangertittivatsiaq fjord in south east Greeland on a bouldering and climbing expedition. In July 2014, Payne sent her second 8B (V13) boulder, Freaks of the Industry, in Lower Chaos Canyon in the RMNP, a project she had spent several seasons working on, and which she ranked as one of the achievements she was most proud of in her career.

=== Rock climbing ===
In 2015, Payne branched into big wall climbing, ascending the 3,264-foot spire of Poumaka in French Polynesia, with Libecki, which was captured in the film, Poumaka (2016).

== Personal life ==
In 2016, Payne was working for USA Climbing. She is a keen amateur photographer.

Payne has spoken openly about the prevalence of eating disorders in her sport, and contributes prominently to a documentary on the subject called Light (2021), by Caroline Treadway.

== Bibliography ==
- Women Who Dare: North America's Most Inspiring Women Climbers (Chris Noble), 2013, Falcon Guides. page 173–185. ISBN 978-0762783717.
- Better Bouldering, 2nd Edition, (John Sherman), 2011, Falcon Guides. Chapter 12: A Woman's Perspective (Angie Payne) ISBN 978-0762770311.

== Filmography ==
- Award-winning documentary on eating disorders in climbing : Caroline Treadway (director) (2021). Light (Motion picture). See Thru Films.
- Documentary on ascent of her ascent of Poumaka : Keith Ladzinski, Andy Mann (director) (2016). Poumaka Tower (Motion picture). 3 String Prod.
- Documentary on leading climbers featuring Payne : Kyle Berkompas (director) (2013). Exposure Vol. 1 (Motion picture). Fryberger Films. ASIN B00IWX37JS.
- Documentary on leading climbers featuring Payne : Mike Call (director) (2007). MVM Volume 2 (Motion picture). Momentum Media.

== See also ==
- History of rock climbing
- List of first ascents (sport climbing)
- Alex Puccio, American bouldering climber
- Alex Johnson, American bouldering climber
