= Kyra Condie =

American rock climber

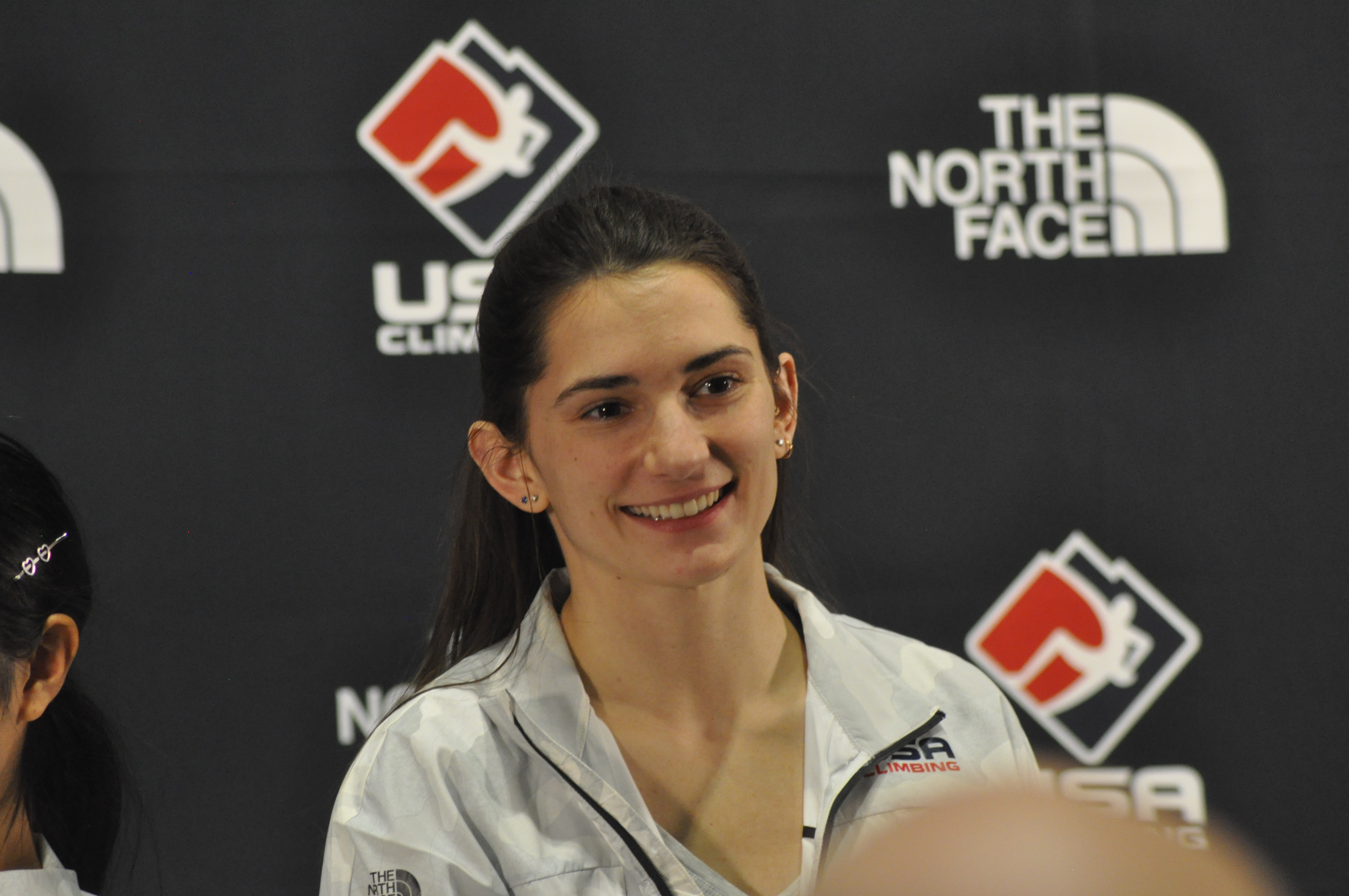
- Condie in 2019

Personal information
- Nationality: American
- Born: June 5, 1996 (age 30) Shoreview, Minnesota
- Education: University of Minnesota
- Height: 5 ft 4 in (163 cm)
- Website: www.kyracondie.com

Climbing career
- Type of climber: Bouldering; Sport climbing; Competition climbing
- Highest grade: Onsight/Flash: 5.13b; Bouldering: V13
Medal record
Women's competition climbing
Representing United States
Pan-American Championship
| Gold medal – first place | 2018 Guayaquil | Combined |
| Bronze medal – third place | 2024 Santiago | Lead |

Kyra Condie (born June 5, 1996) is a rock climber who specializes in competition climbing and was one of four American rock climbers selected to represent Team USA at the 2020 Summer Olympic Games in Tokyo, Japan. She placed 11th in the Women's Combined event in the sport of Sport Climbing. In December 2019, she qualified for the 2020 Summer Olympics following her finish at the IFSC Combined Qualifier Toulouse 2019, becoming the second female American climber to do so.

== Climbing career ==
=== Competition climbing ===
- 2022 Climbing World Cup (Jakarta, Indonesia) -- 11th Place, Lead Women
- 2020 Summer Olympic Games (Tokyo, Japan) -- 11th place in Women's Combined (Sport Climbing)
- 2019 U.S. Climbing Combined Invitational - Gold Medal
- IFSC PanAmerican Championship (L, S, B, C) - Guayaquil (ECU) 2018 - Women's Combined - Gold Medal

=== Climbing style ===
Condie has attributed her climbing style, which relies more on muscles than technique, to training mostly at a small Minneapolis gym with only a 45-degree spray wall, and the difficulty she has twisting her body because of her fused spine. During the pandemic, Condie found creative ways to continue her training at home, creating "off-the-wall" workouts with limited equipment and hanging from door frames.

== Personal life and education ==
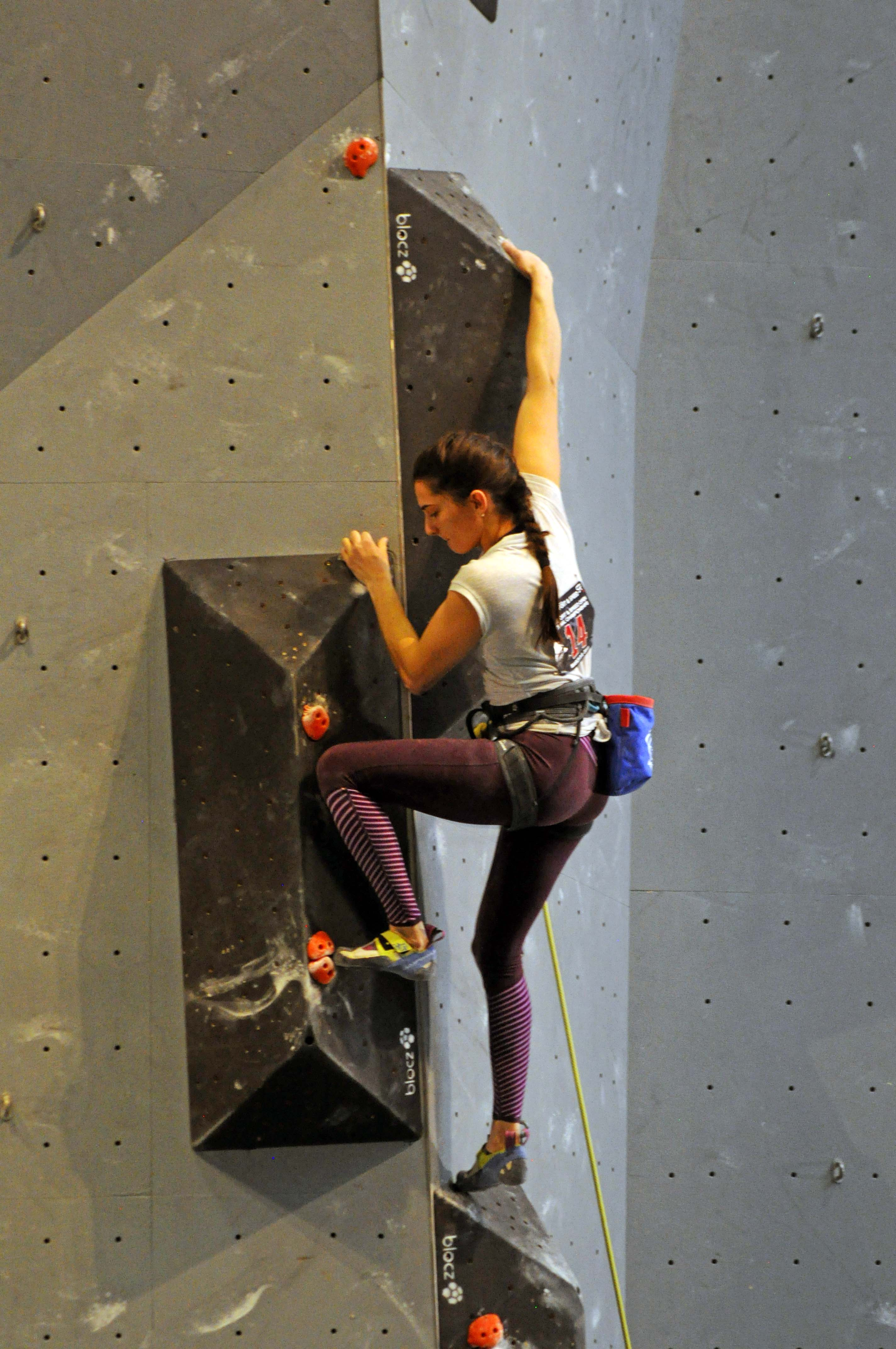
Kyra Condie climbing indoors

Condie underwent vertebrate surgery at age 13 to correct spinal deformation. Having been bullied throughout most of her childhood, Condie trained alone through college. During the 2016 IFSC Climbing World Cup, Condie befriended Canadian climber and fellow Minnesota native Allison Vest. In 2018, Condie moved to train in Salt Lake City after graduating from the University of Minnesota. In spring 2020, with climbing competitions cancelled due to the COVID-19 pandemic, Vest moved in with Condie so they could train together at the USA Climbing Training Center in Salt Lake City. The pair began documenting their training on their shared TikTok account, "Climbing Roommates".

In 2021, Condie was named to Forbes' "30 Under 30" list in the Sports category and Sports Illustrated's "Fittest 50 Athletes in Sports" for that year. In 2022, Condie and Vest launched the podcast "Circle Up with Allison and Kyra", creating 30 minute episodes on climbing, motivation, body image and mindset.
