= Katie Lamb =

American rock climber

Personal information
- Full name: Katherine Lamb
- Nationality: American
- Born: September 16, 1997 (age 29) Lexington, Massachusetts, U.S.
- Education: Stanford University (BA Computer Science, MA Environmental Engineering)
- Occupations: Rock climber, computer scientist
- Height: 165 cm (5 ft 5 in)

Climbing career
- Type of climber: Bouldering; Competition climbing
- Ape index: 0
- Highest grade: Bouldering: 8C+ (V16)
- Known for: First-ever woman to climb an 8C+ (V16) boulder

Katherine Lamb (born September 16, 1997) is an American rock climber who specializes in bouldering, and who in 2023 became the first-ever woman in history to climb an 8C+ (V16) graded boulder.

== Early life ==
Lamb started out at the Boston Rock Gym where she initially focused on competition lead climbing, however despite initial promise (she won the 2012 PanAmerican Youth Championships), her studies at Stanford University in computer science kept her away from being able to focus full-time on climbing. After graduation, Lamb told Climbing that she embarked on an "endless climbing trip, supporting her climbing with a mixture of sponsorships and a 20-hour-per-week data science job". Lamb is a worker-owner of Catalyst Cooperative.

== Notable ascents ==
In February 2023, Lamb did the first female ascent of Spectre (V13/14 ) in The Buttermilks.

On July 28, 2023, Lamb did the first female ascent of Daniel Woods' 2018 route, Box Therapy 8C+ (V16), at the RMNP, becoming the first female climber ever to climb an 8C+ (V16) graded boulder route. However, the boulder was later downgraded by Brooke and Shawn Rabatou, who both considered it to be V15.

In March 2025, Lamb did the first female ascent of The Dark Side 8C+ (V16), in Yosemite National Park, once again achieving the feat of becoming the first female climber to climb V16.

== See also ==
- Tomoko Ogawa, first female climber of an 8B+ (V14) graded boulder
- Angie Payne, first female climber of an 8B (V13) graded boulder
- Ashima Shiraishi, first female climber of an 8C (V15) graded boulder
