= Sasha DiGiulian =

American rock climber (born 1992)

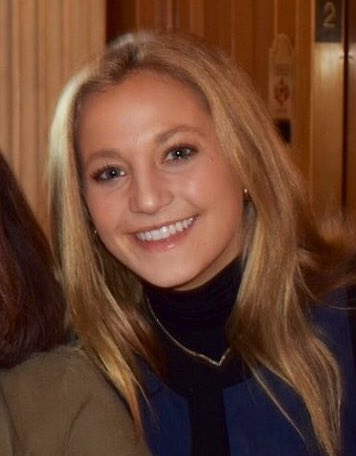
- DiGiulian in 2019

Personal information
- Nationality: American
- Born: October 23, 1992 (age 33) Alexandria, Virginia, U.S.
- Education: Columbia University
- Height: 5 ft 2 in (157 cm)
- Website: sashadigiulian.com

Climbing career
- Type of climber: Competition climbing; Sport climbing; Bouldering
- Highest grade: Redpoint: 5.14d (9a); Onsight/Flash: 5.14a (8b+); Bouldering: V12 (8A+)
Medal record
Women's competition climbing
Representing the United States
World Championships
| Gold medal – first place | 2011 Arco | Combined |
Pan-American Championships
| Gold medal – first place | 2012 Venezuela | Combined |
| Gold medal – first place | 2012 Venezuela | Sport |
| Gold medal – first place | 2012 Venezuela | Bouldering |
| Gold medal – first place | 2010 Ecuador | Combined |
| Gold medal – first place | 2010 Ecuador | Sport |
USA Climbing National Championships
| Silver medal – second place | 2014 | Sport |
| Gold medal – first place | 2012 | Sport |
| Gold medal – first place | 2011 | Sport |
| Bronze medal – third place | 2011 | Bouldering |
| Gold medal – first place | 2010 | Sport |
| Bronze medal – third place | 2009 | Sport |
- Updated on 14:53, 10 January 2020 (UTC)

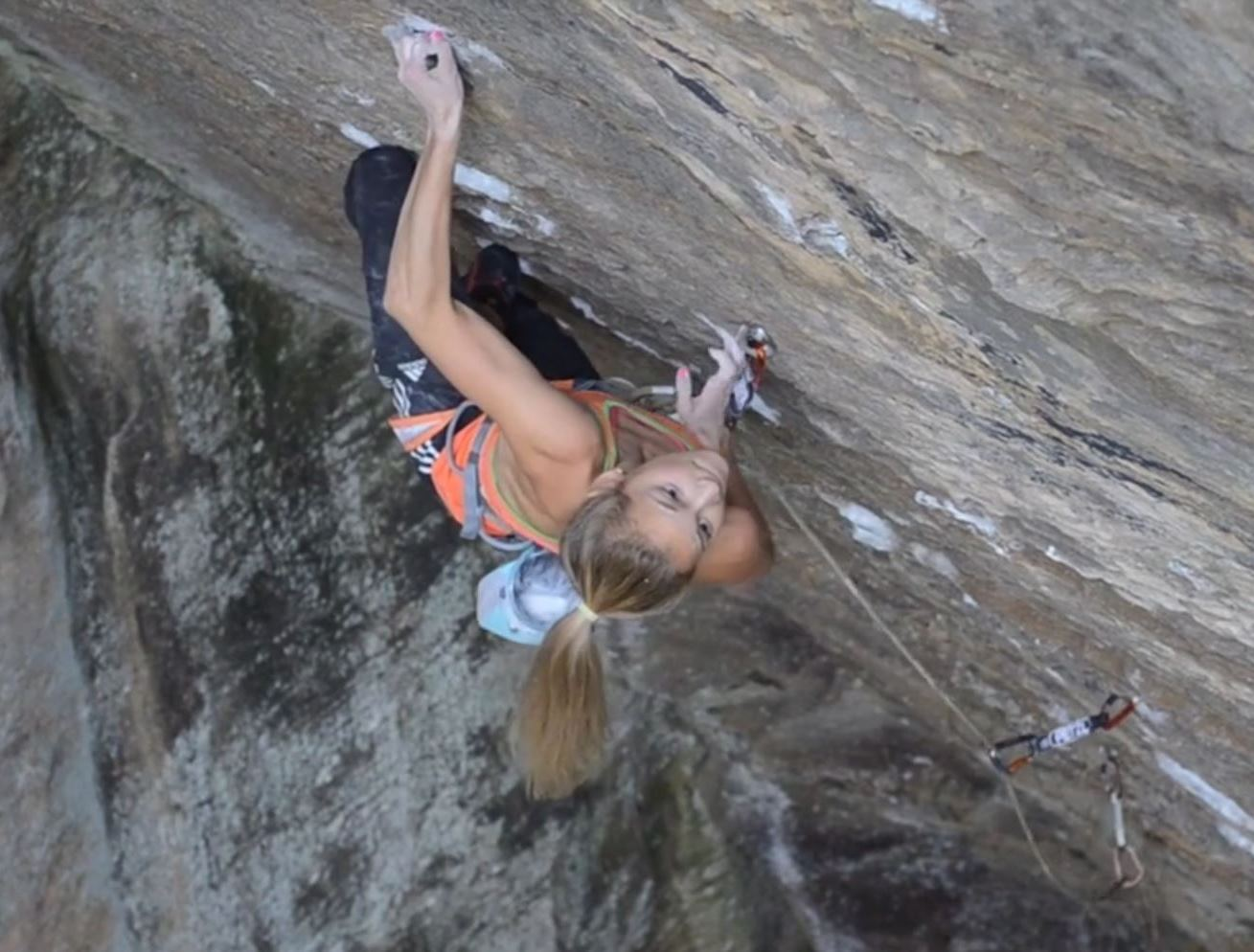
DiGiulian on the Chocolate Factory wall in Red River Gorge of Kentucky in 2011

Sasha DiGiulian (born October 23, 1992) is an American professional rock climber who specializes in outdoor sport and big wall climbing with a background in competition climbing and bouldering. She won the gold medal at the 2011 International Federation of Sport Climbing World Championships in Arco, Italy, for Female Combined. Sasha won multi-year PanAmerican championships and is a three-time US National Champion.

She has climbed over 30 First Female Ascents and over a dozen significant First Ascents, including "Rolihlahla" in South Africa, a Big Wall in Brazil in 2016, and The Misty Wall in Yosemite National Park in 2017. In 2011 she redpointed multiple 5.14c (8c+), onsighted two of 5.14a (8b+) and four of 5.13d (8b). In 2013, she was the first American woman to redpoint Era Vella 5.14d (9a), and established the First Female Ascent of Alpine Big Wall route, Bellavista, 5.14b (8c). In 2015, she became the first woman to free-climb Magic Mushroom (7c+), one of the most difficult routes on the north face of the Eiger. In 2017 she did the first female ascent of Big Wall in Madagascar, Mora Mora (5.14b/8c), climbing it with Edu Marin in what was also the second free ascent of Mora Mora.

== Early life and education ==
DiGiulian attended the Potomac School, a K-12 near Washington, D.C. Prior to climbing, she competed as a figure skater.

== Climbing career ==
DiGiulian started climbing at the age of 6 and began competing at age 7. At age 11 she climbed her first 5.13b (8a). In March 2011, just before graduating from high school, she redpointed Southern Smoke (5.14c) and Lucifer (5.14c) in the Red River Gorge in Kentucky.

After leaving high school, DiGiulian took a gap year to travel and rock climb, concentrating on international competition climbing and outdoor climbing. She won the gold medal in bouldering at the 2011 IFSC Climbing World Championships in Arco, Trentino, Italy. She returned to the Red River Gorge in October 2011, where she redpointed Pure Imagination a 5.14c (8c+) sport climbing route. DiGiulian is a three-time US National Champion in Female Open and was the undefeated Female Open PanAmerican Champion from 2010 to 2018. From 2004 until the end of her junior career in 2010, she was the undefeated junior Pan American Champion.

In 2011, she redpointed 5.14c (8c+), onsighted two 5.14a (8b+) and four 5.13d (8b) routes. In 2012, DiGiulian earned three gold medals at the Panamerican Championships in bouldering and was the overall champion. In 2015, she became the first woman to free-climb Magic Mushroom 7c+ (5.13a), one of the most difficult alpine climbing routes on the north face of the Eiger. She has climbed over 30 first female free ascents (FFFAs) and eight significant first free ascents, including a big wall climbing route in Brazil in 2016, and The Misty Wall in Yosemite in 2017. In 2017, she did the first female free ascent of Mora Mora, climbing it with Edu Marín i Garcia in what was also the second free ascent of Mora Mora.

In 2021, she revealed that she had had a series of hip reconstruction surgeries to address cartilage degeneration, prior to returning to climbing.

In 2025, she and Marianna Ordóñez became the first women to free-climb the route Bravo Les Filles on Tsaranoro Kelly in Madagascar. That year DiGiulian also did a free ascent of Platinum Wall (The Direct Line), a 5.13c/d route on El Capitan; she was the first woman to free-climb the Platinum route.

== Wider career ==
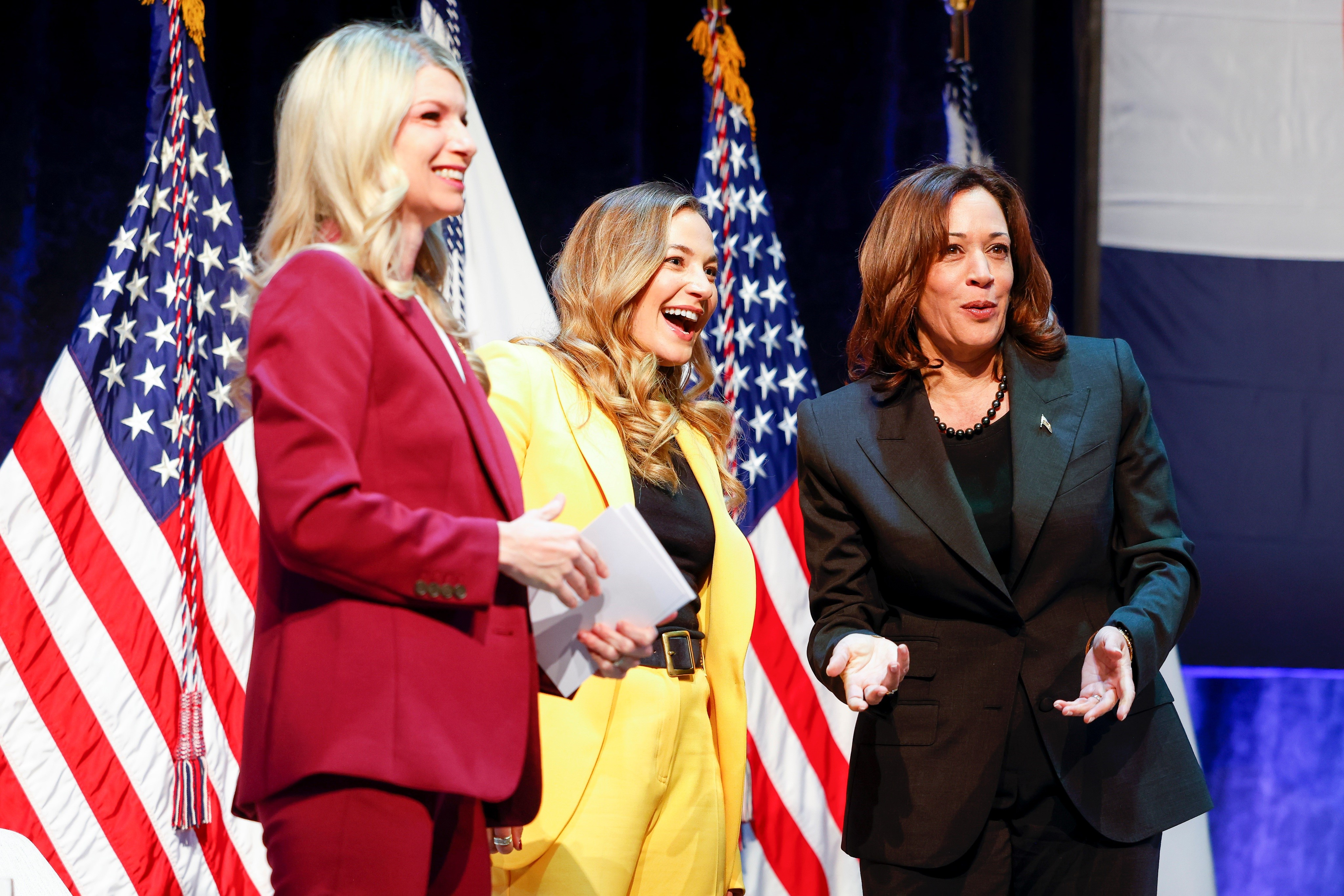
DiGiulian (center) with United States Congresswoman Brittany Pettersen of Colorado (left) and United States Vice President Kamala Harris in March 2023.

DiGiulian produced a film, The Trilogy, about how she became the first female and second person to climb three Canadian Rocky Mountain big wall in a single season. The Trilogy was the first film she produced. She has become a vocal spokesperson on climate change and has lobbied in Washington, D.C. for protections.

She has also been a part of a delegation of professional climbers that included Alex Honnold and Tommy Caldwell at Climb the Hill, a lobbying effort that advocated for legislation relating to public land management, outdoor recreation, climate change, and conservation.

In 2018, DiGiulian used her Instagram account to call out sexism and bias in her sport. She said repeated offensive comments and harassment to her and towards fellow athletes are what led her to speak out.

In 2019, DiGiulian established climbing routes in Southwestern Virginia near the Virginia-Kentucky border in the Breaks Interstate Park.

In September 2023, DiGiulian published a memoir titled Take the Lead: Hanging On, Letting Go, and Conquering Life's Hardest Climbs.

In November 2023, DiGiulian testified in front of the United States House Committee on Natural Resources in support of H.R.6492, also known as the EXPLORE Act.

In 2024 she was highlighted in Red Bull and HBO's film Here to Climb.

== Personal life ==
In 2014, DiGiulian's father had a stroke and was rushed to the hospital. According to interviews with DiGiulian, he was perfectly healthy up until that point. He was put in a medically induced coma but eventually died.

In 2016, DiGiulian graduated from Columbia University. She studied non-fiction creative writing and business, was a member of Kappa Alpha Theta and an athlete representative on the board of the International Federation of Sport Climbing.

In March 2017 a rock climber emoji was approved and the sample image published by Emojipedia was based on DiGiulian's likeness.

In September 2023, DiGiulian married filmmaker Erik Osterholm. The pair met when she was filmed climbing Mount Washington for a 2017 Red Bull documentary series directed and produced by Osterholm, and they began dating in August 2018.

== Awards and other honours ==
DiGiulian serves as a board member of the Women's Sports Foundation and as an Athlete Ambassador for Right to Play, Up2Us Sports, Access Fund, American Alpine Club, and was the recipient of multiple prestigious awards, including Glamour magazine's Top College Women of the Year, 2016, the Cutting Edge Athlete Award for 2014 performance, presented by the American Alpine Club, The Golden Pitons (2011), and the Arco Rock Legend Award for Outstanding Achievements in the Outdoors.

== Filmography ==
- MVM - Volume 2 (2007)
- Pure Imagination (2011)
- Jenny Lavarda - Il muro le vie, i sogni (2011)
- Era Vella (2012)
- Reel Rock S1 E1: La Dura Dura (2012)
- Petzl Roctrip China 2011 (2012)
- Gimme Kraft! (2013)
- The Search for Freedom (2014)
- Viaje de Los Locos (2014)
- Rolihlahla (2014)
- Eiger Dreams - Dispatches (2015)
- Eiger Dreams (2015)
- Reel Rock S3 E5: Young Guns (2016)
- Reel Rock S4 E1: Break on Through (2017)
- The Trilogy (2018)
- Away from Keyboard S2 E2: Milktea and Sasha Climb to New Heights (2018)
- Superior Ice: A Climbing Film (2018)
- Pretty Strong (2020)
- Reel Rock S8 E1: Rayu (2022)
- Here to Climb (2024)
