= Margo Hayes =

American rock climber

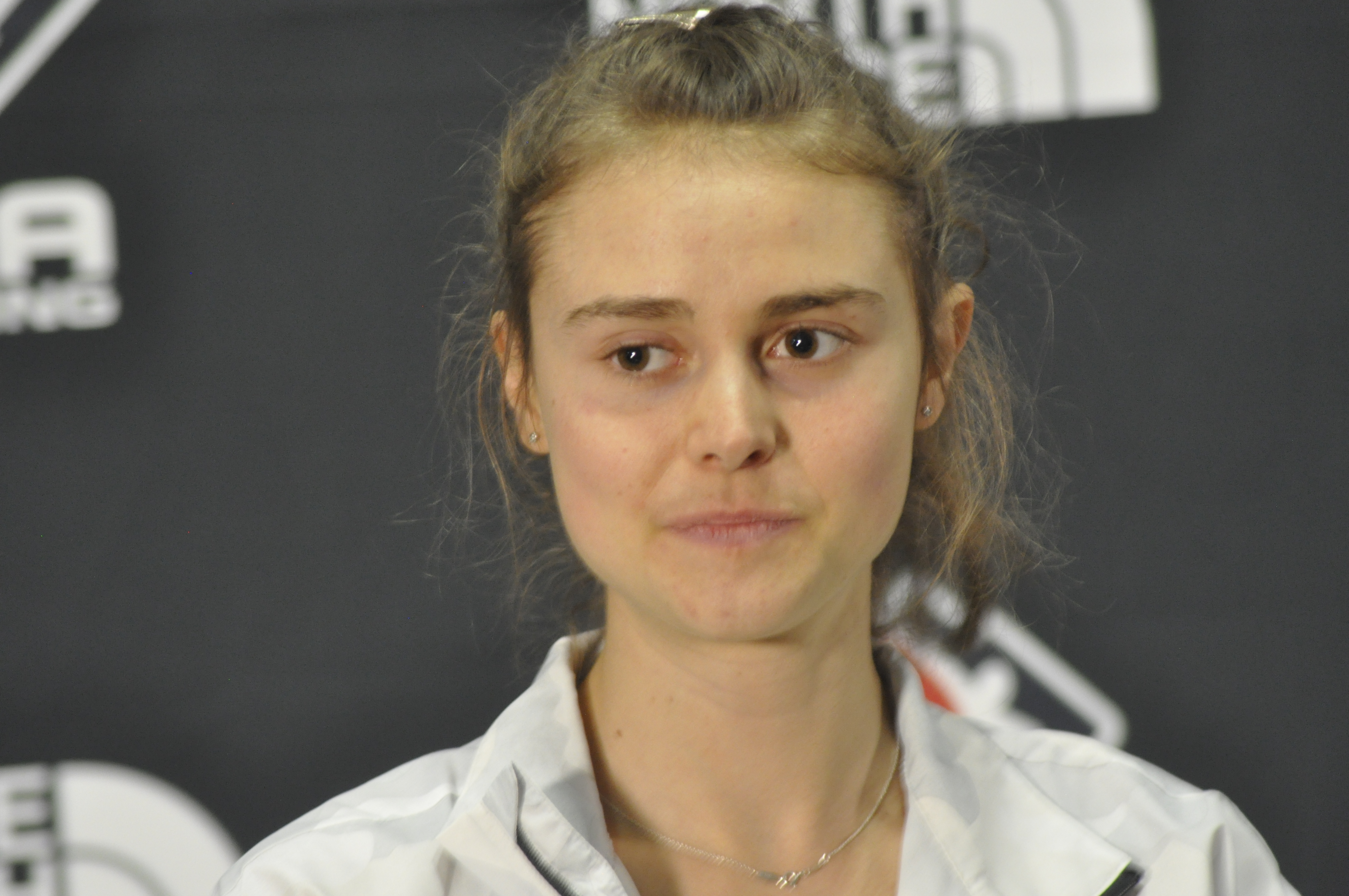
- 2019 Sport & Speed Open Nationals

Personal information
- Nationality: American
- Born: February 11, 1998 (age 28) Boulder, Colorado, U.S.
- Occupation: Professional rock climber

Climbing career
- Type of climber: Competition climbing; Sport climbing
- Highest grade: Redpoint: 9a+ (5.15a)
- Known for: First-ever female to climb at 9a+ (5.15a); First-ever female to complete the "9a+ Trilogy"
Medal record
Women's competition climbing
Representing United States
World Youth Championships
Silver medal – second place	2015	Lead
Silver medal – second place	2015	Bouldering
Gold medal – first place	2016	Lead
Gold medal – first place	2016	Boudering
Gold medal – first place	2016	Combined
Bronze medal – third place	2017	Combined
- Updated on June 29, 2022

Margo Hayes (born February 11, 1998) is an American professional rock climber from Boulder, Colorado. In 2016, she won both the competition bouldering and the competition lead climbing events at the IFSC Climbing World Youth Championships in Guangzhou (China). In 2017, she became the first woman in history to climb a 9a+ (5.15a) graded route, and in 2019, became the first woman in climbing history to complete the coveted "9a+ Trilogy" of Realization, La Rambla, and Papichulo.

== Early life ==
Originally a gymnast who trained at CATS Gymnastics in Boulder, Hayes began climbing at age 10. She joined Team ABC, a renowned youth climbing program in Boulder, where she was coached by Robyn Erbesfield-Raboutou. Hayes' grandfather, Dr. James Morrissey, led the first successful climb of the Kangshung Face on Mt. Everest and her father spent time climbing in Yosemite Valley.

== Climbing career ==
=== Competition climbing ===
As part of the US National Team, Hayes has competed in all three disciplines (lead climbing, speed climbing, and bouldering) of the International Federation of Sport Climbing competitions. In 2015, at the IFSC World Youth Championships in Arco, Italy Hayes won silver both in bouldering and lead, behind Janja Garnbret.

In 2016, at the IFSC World Youth Championships in Guangzhou (China), she competed in the Juniors category, winning both the bouldering and lead events, placing 15th in speed, and placing first in the overall standings.

Hayes was one of four women to earn a spot on the 2019 U.S. Overall National Team as a first step to qualifying for the 2020 Olympics climbing competition.

=== Sport climbing ===
In 2016, Hayes won a Golden Piton Award in the Sport Climbing category from Climbing Magazine for successfully climbing 14 routes graded 5.14.

On February 26, 2017, Hayes became the first-ever woman in history to climb a 9a+ (5.15a) graded route when she ascended La Rambla, in Siurana, Spain). On September 24, 2017, she also completed the third-ever female ascent of a 9a+ (5.15a) when she ascended Realization/Biographie, in Céüse, in France. In March 2019, Hayes completed her third 9a+ (5.15a), climbing Papichulo at Oliana, Spain, and thus completing the trilogy of the "benchmark" and most notable 9a+ (5.15a) graded routes.

== Personal life ==
In 2016 she won a prize in a scholastic art show.

On the 21st of March 2024, she released her first single, 'Karma', produced by Luis Calderon.

== Rankings ==
- 2015 - IFSC Youth World Championships Female Youth A Lead - Silver
- 2015 - IFSC Youth World Championships Female Youth A Boulder - Silver
- 2015 - USA Climbing Sport & Speed Climbing Champions - Silver
- 2016 - IFSC Youth World Championships Female Junior Lead - Gold
- 2016 - IFSC Youth World Championships Female Junior Boulder - Gold
- 2016 - USA Climbing Sport & Speed Climbing Champions - Gold
- 2017 - IFSC Pan American Youth Championships Female Junior Lead - Silver
- 2017 - IFSC Pan American Youth Championships Female Junior Boulder - Gold
- 2017 - USA Climbing Sport & Speed Climbing Champions - Silver
- 2017 - IFSC Youth World Championships Female Junior Combined - Bronze
- 2018 - IFSC Climbing World Championships Female Boulder - 10th
- 2019 - USA Climbing Open Bouldering Championships - Bronze

== Notable ascents ==
=== Redpointed routes ===
9a+ (5.15a):

- Papichulo – Oliana (ESP) – March 24, 2019 – First female ascent. Hayes became the first female to complete the "9a+ trilogy".
- Realization/Biographie – Céüse (FRA) – September 24, 2017 – First female ascent of one of the famous routes in sport climbing.
- La Rambla – Siurana (ESP) – February 26, 2017 – First-ever female ascent in history of a consensus 9a+ (5.15a) climb.

9a (5.14d):

- Bad Girls Club – Wicked Cave (Rifle Mountain Park. (USA) – August 2016 – First female ascent.

8c+ (5.14c):

- The Crew – Rifle Mountain Park (Colorado, (USA) – June 2016.

== Filmography ==
- Break on Through - 2017 film directed by Matty Hong, documenting Hayes' ascent of La Rambla and Biographie, featured on Reel Rock 12.

== See also ==
- Notable first free ascents
