= Kai Lightner =

American professional sport climber

Personal information
- Born: August 21, 1999 (age 26)

Kai Lightner (born August 21, 1999) is an American professional competitive sport climber from Fayetteville, North Carolina, and an advocate for diversity in rock climbing.

== Biography ==
When Lightner was six years old, he climbed a 50-foot flagpole in his hometown of Fayetteville, North Carolina. A woman passing on the street gave Lightner's mother the address of a local climbing gym. Four years later, Lightner won his first youth sport climbing national championship.

In 2014, Lightner earned the gold medal for his age category (14–15) at the Youth World Championships in New Caledonia, becoming the first Youth American Lead World Champion since 1995. In 2015, at the age of 15, he became the Open Lead Climbing National Champion in his first year of eligibility. In 2017, Lightner won Lead Open Nationals in Denver, Colorado. Overall, Lightner has earned 10 Youth National Championship titles and is a five-time Youth World Championship Medalist.

Lightner has become an advocate for diversity in rock climbing. In the summer of 2020, in the wake of the George Floyd protests, Lightner founded a nonprofit called Climbing for Change(C4C). The goal of C4C is to provide opportunities for people of color both in climbing gyms and outside. In a 2020 article in Climbing Magazine, Lightner proposed that through his own media exposure, climbing might evolve to be a more inclusive activity, noting that in Black and white communities alike, climbing is perceived as "a white sport."

In 2016, Lightner was featured alongside climber Ashima Shiraishi in the Reel Rock 11 film Young Guns.

In 2020, Lightner was enrolled at Babson College after graduating high school as valedictorian. He created a non-profit for diversity and inclusivity in rock climbing.

In 2025, Lightner was in Reel Rock 19.

== Outdoor climbing highlights ==
- Ciudad de Dios (5.14d/5.15a) in Santa Linya, Spain ^{[11]}
- Direct Into Your Fabelita (5.14d) in Santa Linya, Spain ^{[11]}
- Death of Villains (5.15a) in Hurricave, Utah
- Life of Villains (5.14d) in Hurricave, Utah
- Era Vella (5.14c/d) in Margalef, Spain
- Lucifer (5.14c) and Southern Smoke (5.14c) in the Red River Gorge
