= Ethan Pringle =

American rock climber (born 1986)

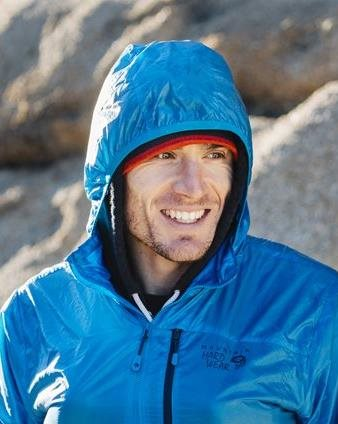
- Ethan Pringle, 2021

Personal information
- Nickname: Piledriver
- Nationality: American
- Born: May 30, 1986 (age 40) San Francisco, California
- Occupation: Professional rock climber
- Height: 5 ft 10 in (178 cm)
- Weight: 150 lb (68 kg)
- Website: dmmwales.com/climbers/ethan-pringle

Climbing career
- Type of climber: Sport climbing; Traditional climbing; Bouldering; Competition climbing
- Highest grade: Onsight/Flash: 5.14b (8c); Bouldering: V15 (8C)
- First ascents: Spicy Dumpling:(9a, 2010); Arrested Development (9a, 2012); Blackbeard's Tears (5.14c, 2016); Everything is Karate (9a, 2017)
- Known for: First repeat of Jumbo Love
Medal record
Men's competition climbing
Representing United States
World Youth Championships
Silver medal – second place	2000	Lead
- Updated on 28 July 2023

Ethan Pringle (born May 30, 1986, in San Francisco, California) is an American rock climber with notable ascents in sport climbing (his 2015 repeat of Jumbo Love, the world's first 9b-graded route); in traditional climbing (his 2016 ascent of Blackbeard's Tears, one of the world's hardest traditional climbs); and in bouldering. He has also been active in competition climbing, winning the American national competition lead climbing championships in both youth and adult formats, and silver at the World Youth Championships.

== Early life ==
Pringle was born and raised in the Mission District, San Francisco, and started climbing when he was 8 years old and began competition climbing when he was 12. By age 12 he had redpointed his first 5.13a (7c+), and by age 13, had redpointed his first 5.14a (8b+).

== Climbing career ==
=== Competition climbing ===
Pringle was the American youth national champion in lead climbing for four consecutive years from 1998 to 2002. In 2000, he won silver in lead at the IFSC Climbing World Youth Championships in lead climbing.

Pringle won the gold in the men's USA national championships in lead in 2005, silver in 2004, and bronze in 2009. He won the silver at the men's USA national championships bouldering in 2006 and 2012. He also won bronze in the men's USA national championships in speed in 2004.

In 2009, Pringle suffered a severe tear of his labrum at the men's USA national championships in bouldering, which nearly ended his professional climbing career, and from which he only recovered over a year later.

=== Sport climbing ===
Pringle came to international attention with his September 2007 repeat of Chris Sharma's groundbreaking 2001 route, Realization/Biographie 9a+ (5.15a), in Ceuse, France. At the time, 9a+ was the highest recognized consensus grade for a sport climbing route in the world. He followed his up with a short visit to Rodellar in Spain, where he onsighted several routes up to 8c (5.14b), including Iron Man (this was just before the Patxi Usobiaga made the first-ever onsight of an 8c+ (5.14c) graded route in December 2007).

During 2007, Pringle and Sharma spent weeks trying to make the first free ascent (FFA) of Jumbo Love at Clark Mountain. Injury caused Pringle to withdraw from the project, and in September 2008, Sharma freed the route, which is now regarded as the first-ever 9b (5.15b) graded sport climb in history.

Recovering from his serious injury in 2009–2010, Pringle began to make FFAs of 9a (5.14d) routes including Spicy Dumpling (2010, China's hardest sport climbing route) and Arrested Development (2012). In 2015, Pringle completed the first repeat of Jumbo Love, and later that year visited the famous Hanshelleren Cave in Norway, repeating Adam Ondra's 2012 route Thor's Hammer 9a+ (5.15a), and making his own FFA of The Eye of Odin at 8c+ (5.14c). The following year, Pringle made the FFA of Everything is Karate, one of America's hardest sport routes at the time at 9a (5.14d).

=== Traditional climbing ===
Pringle is also known for traditional climbing. In October 2008, Pringle made the second repeat of Cobra Crack, Sonnie Trotter's famous 8c (5.14b) graded traditional climbing route; considered one of the world's hardest at the time. In 2016, Pringle made the FFA of Blackbeard's Tears on the Redwood Coast in California, which at 8c+ (5.14c), was regarded as one of the hardest – if not the hardest – traditional climbing routes at the time.

== Notable ascents ==
=== Sport climbing ===
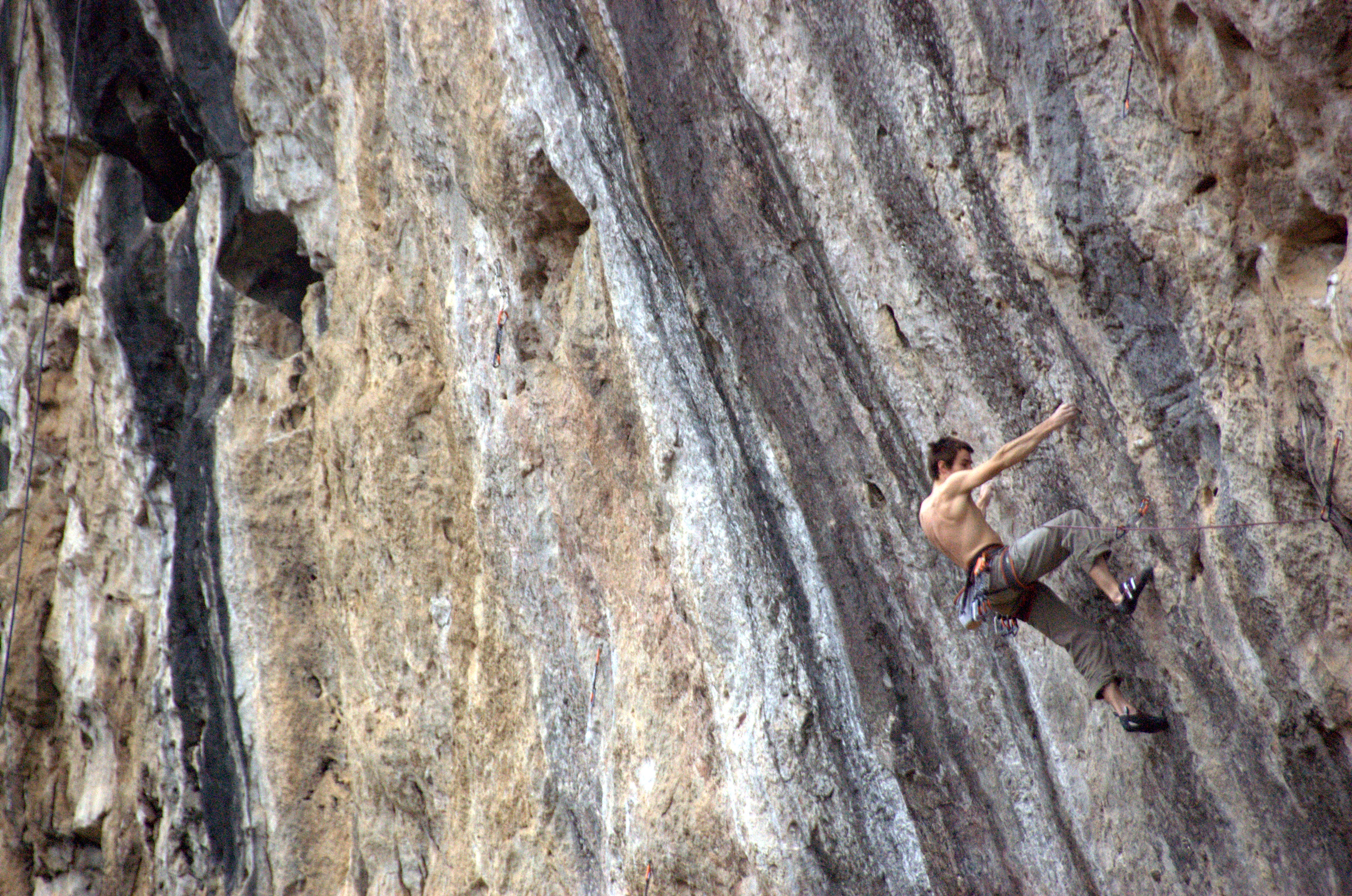
Pringle on the FFA of Spicy Dumpling 5.14d (9a), White Mountain (China); which became China's hardest sport climbing route.

9b (5.15b):

- Jumbo Love – Clark Mountain (USA) – May 2015. First repeat of Chris Sharma's 2008 route.

9a+ (5.15a):

- Empath – Kirkwood, California (US) – June 2021. Fourth repeat of Carlo Traversi's 2020 route.

- Thor's Hammer – Flatanger (NOR) – October 2015. Fourth repeat of Adam Ondra's 2012 route.

- Realization – Ceuse (FRA) – September 2007. Fourth repeat of Chris Sharma's 2001 route.

9a (5.14d):

- Everything is Karate – Bishop, California (US) – April 2017. First ascent.

- La Reina Mora – Siurana (ESP) – March 2016. Repeat.

- Arrested Development – Mount Charleston, Nevada (US) – June 2012. First ascent.

- Spicy Dumpling: – Yangshoo (CHN) – December 2010. First ascent of Chris Sharma's bolted line, and China's hardest sport climb.

=== Onsight ===
8c (5.14b):

- Iron Man – Rodellar (ESP) – October 2007. Repeat onsight.

8b+ (5.14a):

- Pequena Estrella – Rodellar (ESP) – October 2007. Repeat onsight.
- Philipe Cuisinere – Rodellar (ESP) – October 2007. Repeat onsight.

=== Traditional climbing ===
8c+ (5.14c):

- Blackbeard's Tears – Redwood Coast, California (USA) – September 2016. First free ascent, and was considered to be probably the hardest traditional climbs in the world at the time; and still one of the most difficult.

8c (5.14b):

- Cobra Crack – Squamish, British Columbia (CAN) – August 2008. Third ascent of Sonnie Trotter's famous 2006 route, and still considered to be one of the world's hardest traditional climbs.

=== Bouldering ===
V15 (8C):

- The Wheel of Life – Grampians National Park (AUS) – June 2010. Second repeat of Dai Koyamada's famous 2004 boulder.

- The Nest – Red Rocks, Nevada (US) – July 2018. Fourth repeat of Daniel Woods' 2013 boulder.

- Kintsugi – Red Rocks, Nevada (US) – April 2019. Fourth repeat of Nalle Hukkataival's 2015 boulder.

== See also ==
- History of rock climbing
- List of first ascents (sport climbing)
