= 1993 UIAA Climbing World Championships =

Competition climbing event

- Location: Innsbruck, Austria
- Date: 29 – 30 April 1993
- Competitors: 127 from 23 nations

The 1993 UIAA Climbing World Championships, the 2nd edition, were held in Innsbruck, Austria from 29 to 30 April 1993. It was organized by the Union Internationale des Associations d'Alpinisme (UIAA). The championships consisted of lead and speed events.

== Medalists ==
Event	Gold	Silver	Bronze
Men's Lead	François Legrand (2); France	Stefan Glowacz; Germany	Yuji Hirayama; Japan
Men's Speed	Vladimir Netsvetaev-Dolgalev; Russia	Serik Kazbekov; Ukraine	Yevgen Kryvosheytsev; Ukraine
Women's Lead	Susi Good (2); Switzerland	Robyn Erbesfield; United States	Isabelle Patissier; France
Women's Speed	Olga Bibik; Russia	Isabelle Dorsimond; Belgium	Renata Piszczek; Poland

== Lead ==
François Legrand and Susi Good won and defended their titles.

Men				Women			
Rank	Name	Nation	Result	Rank	Name	Nation	Result
1st place, gold medalist(s)	François Legrand	France	8700	1st place, gold medalist(s)	Susi Good	Switzerland	7700
2nd place, silver medalist(s)	Stefan Glowacz	Germany	6960	2nd place, silver medalist(s)	Robyn Erbesfield	United States	6160
3rd place, bronze medalist(s)	Yuji Hirayama	Japan	5655	3rd place, bronze medalist(s)	Isabelle Patissier	France	5005
4	François Petit	France	4785	4	Nanette Raybaud	France	4235
5	Nicola Sartori	Italy	4437	5	Yulia Inozemtseva	Russia	3927
6	Patxi Arocena	Spain	4089	6	Elena Ovtchinnikova	United States	3619
7	Christoph Bucher	Germany	3741	7	Luisa Iovane	Italy	3311
8	Pavel Samoiline	Russia	3480	8	Iwona Gronkiewicz-Marcisz	Poland	3080
9	François Lombard	France	3219	9	Anna Ibanez-Tudoras	Spain	2849
9	Evgeny Ovchinnikov	Russia	3219	10	Andrea Eisenhut	Germany	2618

== Speed ==
Vladimir Netsvetaev-Dolgalev and Olga Bibik were the 1993 Speed World Cup Champions. Defending champions Hans Florine and Isabelle Dorsimond placed 4th and 2nd respectively.

Men			Women		
Rank	Name	Nation	Rank	Name	Nation
1st place, gold medalist(s)	Vladimir Netsvetaev-Dolgalev	Russia	1st place, gold medalist(s)	Olga Bibik	Russia
2nd place, silver medalist(s)	Serik Kazbekov	Ukraine	2nd place, silver medalist(s)	Isabelle Dorsimond	Belgium
3rd place, bronze medalist(s)	Yevgen Kryvosheytsev	Ukraine	3rd place, bronze medalist(s)	Renata Piszczek	Poland
4	Hans Florine	United States	4	Yulia Inozemtseva	Russia
5	Andrzej Marcisz	Poland	5	Mihaela Craciun-Pantis	Romania
5	Johan Mus	Belgium	5	Margarita Panfyorova	Ukraine
5	Kairat Rakhmetov	Kazakhstan	5	Nataliya Perlova	Ukraine
5	Christian Schlesener	Germany	5	Susan Winkler	Germany
9	Gregor Jaeger	Germany	9	Eriko Mogi	Japan
9	Mateusz Kilarski	Poland			
9	Rudolf Mihal	Slovakia			
9	Alexandre Minaev	Russia			
9	Vitaly Skorik	Ukraine			
9	Oleg Tcherechnev	Russia			
9	Andrey Vedenmeer	Ukraine			
16	Rastislav Sulik	Slovakia			
