= Ranking of career World Climbing victories by climber =

Ranking of career gold climbing medals

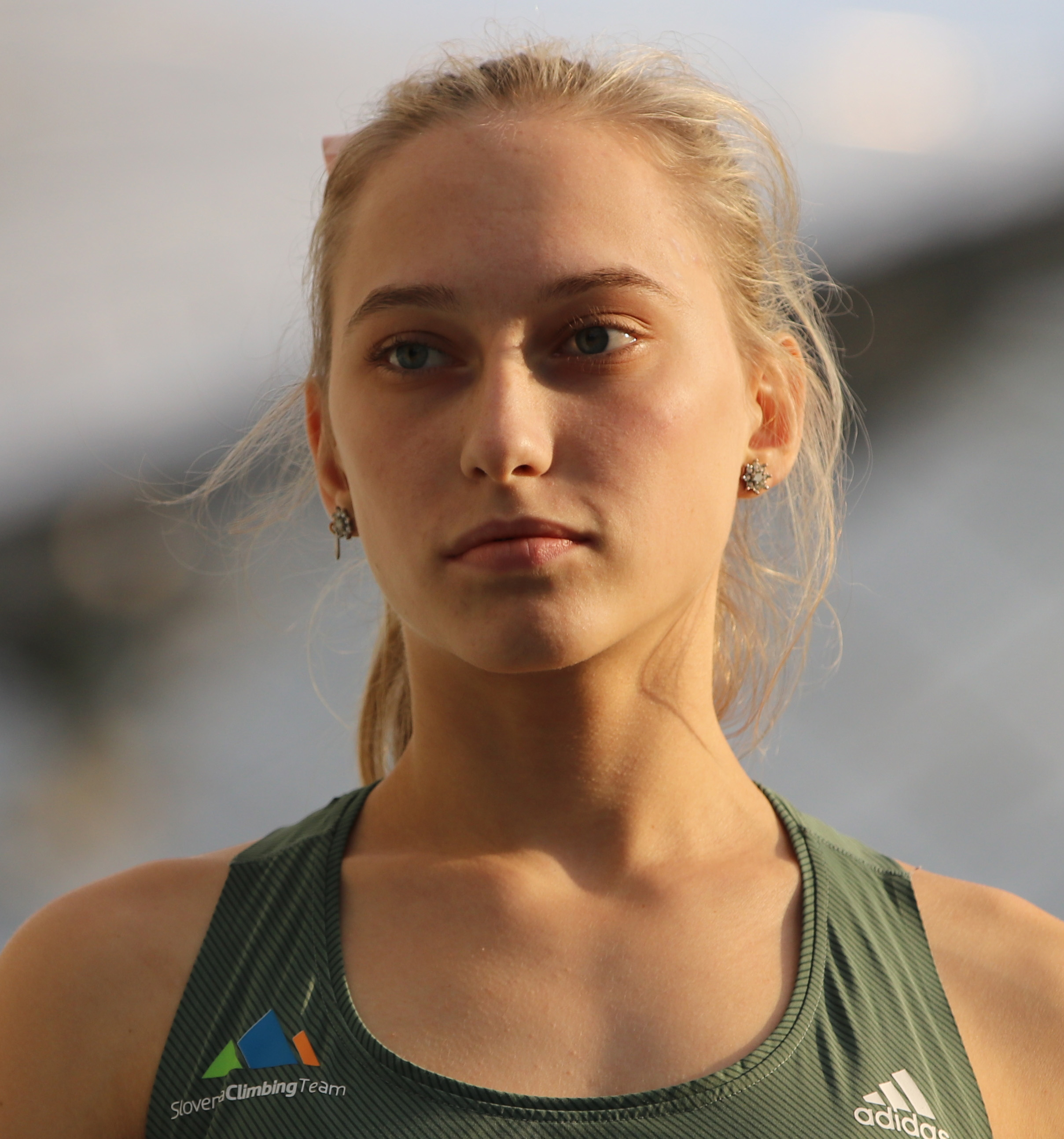
At the end of 2022, Janja Garnbret had won the most career IFSC victories and gold medals of any competition climber in history.

This is a ranking of total career victories obtained in the annual World Climbing Series and the biennial World Climbing Championship, which were organized by the International Climbing and Mountaineering Federation from 1989 to 2006, and World Climbing (formerly the International Federation of Sport Climbing) since 2007.

Climbers are ranked based on the total number of victories (i.e. won the biennial Championship or won the overall annual Cup) obtained throughout their competition climbing career across all four disciplines: Lead climbing, Bouldering, Speed climbing, and the Combined discipline, in these two events.

== Comparison with World Climbing rankings ==
This list is distinct from the World Climbing Rankings, which are computed separately for each of the four disciplines (i.e. Lead, Bouldering, Speed), and are based on the sum of all results, and not just victories, achieved by each athlete in the last twelve months. Most career World Climbing gold medals is a metric that is tracked by the climbing media, as was widely reported in the case of Janja Garnbret. However, as the annual World Cup consists of several individual events for which gold medals are awarded, the number of "victories" is usually less than the total number of "gold medals".

== Tabulation ==
Athletes who have won at least one gold medal in an World Cup series or a World Championship are listed in the tables below. They are ranked based on the number of victories (T) they obtained throughout their career across all disciplines.

Separate scores are provided for each of the two types of competition (1 = World Cups and 2 = World Championships), and the four disciplines (L = Lead climbing, B = Bouldering, S = Speed climbing, and C = Combined disciplines). Therefore, L_{1} is the number of Lead climbing World Cups awarded to each athlete.

For each athlete, the total number of victories (T) is obtained by adding together their total victories in the eight events:

T = L_{1} + B_{1} + S_{1} + C_{1} + L_{2} + B_{2} + S_{2} + C_{2}

Partial totals are also provided for each discipline and competition. For instance, the total number of victories obtained in Lead climbing by each athlete is:

L = L_{1} + L_{2}

and the total number of World Cups awarded to each athlete is:

T_{1} = L_{1} + B_{1} + S_{1} + C_{1}

== Results for Women ==
Sortable table, pre-sorted by total number of victories (T), updated on October 25, 2026.

First Name	Last Name	Total victories					World Cup series					World Championships				
First Name	Last Name	Lead	Bouldering	Speed	Combined	L + B + S + C	Lead	Bouldering	Speed	Combined	Total	Lead	Bouldering	Speed	Combined	Total
First Name	Last Name	L	B	S	C	T	L_{1}	B_{1}	S_{1}	C_{1}	T_{1}	L_{2}	B_{2}	S_{2}	C_{2}	T_{2}
Janja	Garnbret	8	5	0	7	20	5	1	0	4	10	3	4	0	3	10
Sandrine	Levet	0	6	0	5	11	0	5	0	5	10	0	1	0	0	1
Angela	Eiter	7	0	0	1	8	3	0	0	1	4	4	0	0	0	4
Jain	Kim	4	0	0	3	7	3	0	0	2	5	1	0	0	1	2
Akiyo	Noguchi	0	4	0	3	7	0	4	0	3	7	0	0	0	0	0
Mina	Markovič	3	0	0	3	6	3	0	0	3	6	0	0	0	0	0
Liv	Sansoz	5	0	0	1	6	3	0	0	1	4	2	0	0	0	2
Muriel	Sarkany	6	0	0	0	6	5	0	0	0	5	1	0	0	0	1
Anna	Stöhr	0	6	0	0	6	0	4	0	0	4	0	2	0	0	2
Natalia	Grossman	0	5	0	0	5	0	4	0	0	4	0	1	0	0	1
Robyn	Erbesfield	5	0	0	0	5	4	0	0	0	4	1	0	0	0	1
Tatiana	Ruyga	0	0	5	0	5	0	0	3	0	3	0	0	2	0	2
Olena	Ryepko	0	0	5	0	5	0	0	2	0	2	0	0	3	0	3
Jessica	Pilz	3	0	0	1	4	2	0	0	0	2	1	0	0	1	2
Olga	Zakharova	0	0	4	0	4	0	0	3	0	3	0	0	1	0	1
Johanna	Ernst	3	0	0	0	3	2	0	0	0	2	1	0	0	0	1
Maria	Krasavina	0	0	3	0	3	0	0	2	0	2	0	0	1	0	1
Edyta	Ropek	0	0	3	0	3	0	0	3	0	3	0	0	0	0	0
Emma	Hunt	0	0	3	0	3	0	0	3	0	3	0	0	0	0	0
Olga	Bibik	0	1	1	0	2	0	1	0	0	1	0	0	1	0	1
Shauna	Coxsey	0	2	0	0	2	0	2	0	0	2	0	0	0	0	0
Alina	Gaydamakina	0	0	2	0	2	0	0	2	0	2	0	0	0	0	0
Susi	Good	2	0	0	0	2	0	0	0	0	0	2	0	0	0	2
Cuilian	He	0	0	2	0	2	0	0	0	0	0	0	0	2	0	2
Anouck	Jaubert	0	0	2	0	2	0	0	2	0	2	0	0	0	0	0
Natalia	Kałucka	0	0	2	0	2	0	0	1	0	1	0	0	1	0	1
Yulia	Levochkina	0	0	2	0	2	0	0	1	0	1	0	0	1	0	1
Aleksandra	Mirosław	0	0	2	0	2	0	0	0	0	0	0	0	2	0	1
Myriam	Motteau	0	2	0	0	2	0	1	0	0	1	0	1	0	0	1
Isabelle	Patissier	2	0	0	0	2	2	0	0	0	2	0	0	0	0	0
Chae-hyun	Seo	2	0	0	0	2	1	0	0	0	1	1	0	0	0	1
Erin	McNeice	1	1	0	0	2	1	1	0	0	2	0	0	0	0	0
Yulia	Abramchuk	0	1	0	0	1	0	0	0	0	0	0	1	0	0	1
Oriane	Bertone	0	1	0	0	1	0	1	0	0	1	0	0	0	0	0
Stéphanie	Bodet	0	1	0	0	1	0	1	0	0	1	0	0	0	0	0
Elena	Choumilova	0	0	0	1	1	0	0	0	1	1	0	0	0	0	0
Martina	Cufar	1	0	0	0	1	0	0	0	0	0	1	0	0	0	1
Juliette	Danion	0	1	0	0	1	0	1	0	0	1	0	0	0	0	0
Lijuan	Deng	0	0	1	0	1	0	0	1	0	1	0	0	0	0	0
Isabelle	Dorsimond	0	0	1	0	1	0	0	0	0	0	0	0	1	0	1
Charlotte	Durif	0	0	0	1	1	0	0	0	0	0	0	0	0	1	1
Alina	Gaidamakina	0	0	1	0	1	0	0	0	0	0	0	0	1	0	1
Natalija	Gros	0	0	0	1	1	0	0	0	1	1	0	0	0	0	0
Lynn	Hill	1	0	0	0	1	1	0	0	0	1	0	0	0	0	0
Aleksandra	Kałucka	0	0	1	0	1	0	0	1	0	1	0	0	0	0	0
Yulia	Kaplina	0	0	1	0	1	0	0	1	0	1	0	0	0	0	0
Petra	Klingler	0	1	0	0	1	0	0	0	0	0	0	1	0	0	1
Elena	Krasovskaya	0	0	0	1	1	0	0	0	0	0	0	0	0	1	1
Desak M.R.	Kusuma Dewi	0	0	1	0	1	0	0	0	0	0	0	0	1	0	1
Ai	Mori	1	0	0	0	1	0	0	0	0	0	1	0	0	0	1
Miho	Nonaka	0	1	0	0	1	0	1	0	0	1	0	0	0	0	0
Nataliya	Perlova	0	1	0	0	1	0	1	0	0	1	0	0	0	0	0
Lisa	Rands	0	1	0	0	1	0	1	0	0	1	0	0	0	0	0
Nanette	Raybaud	1	0	0	0	1	1	0	0	0	1	0	0	0	0	0
Natalie	Richer	0	0	1	0	1	0	0	0	0	0	0	0	1	0	1
Mélanie	Sandoz	0	1	0	0	1	0	0	0	0	0	0	1	0	0	1
Olga	Shalagina	0	1	0	0	1	0	0	0	0	0	0	1	0	0	1
Yiling	Song	0	0	1	0	1	0	0	1	0	1	0	0	0	0	0
Anna	Stenkovaya	0	0	1	0	1	0	0	1	0	1	0	0	0	0	0
Anna	Tsyganova	0	0	1	0	1	0	0	0	0	0	0	0	1	0	1
Maja	Vidmar	1	0	0	0	1	1	0	0	0	1	0	0	0	0	0
Annie	Sanders	1	0	0	0	1	1	0	0	0	1	0	0	0	0	0
Juliane	Wurm	0	1	0	0	1	0	0	0	0	0	0	1	0	0	1
Valentina	Yurina	0	0	1	0	1	0	0	1	0	1	0	0	0	0	0
Total		50	37	43	25	155	34	26	24	20	104	16	11	19	5	51

== Results for Men ==
Sortable table, pre-sorted by total number of victories (T), updated on October 25, 2026.

First Name	Last Name	Total victories					World Cup series					World Championships				
First Name	Last Name	Lead	Bouldering	Speed	Combined	L + B + S + C	Lead	Bouldering	Speed	Combined	Total	Lead	Bouldering	Speed	Combined	Total
First Name	Last Name	L	B	S	C	T	L_{1}	B_{1}	S_{1}	C_{1}	T_{1}	L_{2}	B_{2}	S_{2}	C_{2}	T_{2}
Jakob	Schubert	7	0	0	6	13	3	0	0	4	7	4	0	0	2	6
Adam	Ondra	6	2	0	3	11	3	1	0	3	7	3	1	0	0	4
François	Legrand	8	0	0	0	8	5	0	0	0	5	3	0	0	0	3
Tomoa	Narasaki	0	4	0	3	7	0	2	0	2	4	0	2	0	1	3
Kilian	Fischhuber	0	5	0	1	6	0	5	0	1	6	0	0	0	0	0
Sorato	Anraku	1	5	0	0	6	1	4	0	0	5	0	1	0	0	1
Alexandre	Chabot	3	0	0	2	5	3	0	0	2	5	0	0	0	0	0
Sean	McColl	0	0	0	5	5	0	0	0	2	2	0	0	0	3	3
Qixin	Zhong	0	0	5	0	5	0	0	0	0	0	0	0	5	0	5
Jérôme	Meyer	0	4	0	0	4	0	4	0	0	4	0	0	0	0	0
Tomáš	Mrázek	3	0	0	1	4	1	0	0	1	2	2	0	0	0	2
Tomasz	Oleksy	0	0	2	2	4	0	0	2	2	4	0	0	0	0	0
François	Petit	3	0	0	1	4	2	0	0	1	3	1	0	0	0	1
Dmitri	Sarafutdinov	0	4	0	0	4	0	1	0	0	1	0	3	0	0	3
Maksym	Styenkovyy	0	0	3	1	4	0	0	1	1	2	0	0	2	0	2
Evgeny	Vaitcekhovsky	0	0	4	0	4	0	0	3	0	3	0	0	1	0	1
Danyil	Boldyrev	0	0	3	0	3	0	0	1	0	1	0	0	2	0	2
Christian	Core	0	3	0	0	3	0	2	0	0	2	0	1	0	0	1
Ramón	Julián	3	0	0	0	3	1	0	0	0	1	2	0	0	0	2
Stanislav	Kokorin	0	0	3	0	3	0	0	3	0	3	0	0	0	0	0
Veddriq	Leonardo	0	0	3	0	3	0	0	3	0	3	0	0	0	0	0
Sergey	Sinitsyn	0	0	3	0	3	0	0	3	0	3	0	0	0	0	0
Patxi	Usobiaga	3	0	0	0	3	2	0	0	0	2	1	0	0	0	1
Andrey	Vedenmeer	0	0	3	0	3	0	0	2	0	2	0	0	1	0	1
Sachi	Amma	2	0	0	0	2	2	0	0	0	2	0	0	0	0	0
Jong-won	Chon	0	2	0	0	2	0	2	0	0	2	0	0	0	0	0
Marcin	Dzieński	0	0	2	0	2	0	0	1	0	1	0	0	1	0	1
Yuji	Hirayama	2	0	0	0	2	2	0	0	0	2	0	0	0	0	0
Bassa	Mawem	0	0	2	0	2	0	0	2	0	2	0	0	0	0	0
Yoshiyuki	Ogata	0	2	0	0	2	0	2	0	0	2	0	0	0	0	0
Jorg	Verhoeven	1	0	0	1	2	1	0	0	1	2	0	0	0	0	0
Toby	Roberts	1	0	0	0	1	1	0	0	0	1	0	0	0	0	0
Neo	Suzuki	1	0	0	0	1	1	0	0	0	1	0	0	0	0	0
Reza	Alipour	0	0	1	0	1	0	0	0	0	0	0	0	1	0	1
Daniel	Andrada	0	0	1	0	1	0	0	0	0	0	0	0	1	0	1
Mauro	Calibani	0	1	0	0	1	0	0	0	0	0	0	1	0	0	1
Flavio	Crespi	1	0	0	0	1	1	0	0	0	1	0	0	0	0	0
Romain	Desgranges	1	0	0	0	1	1	0	0	0	1	0	0	0	0	0
Vladislav	Deulin	0	0	1	0	1	0	0	1	0	1	0	0	0	0	0
Daniel	Dulac	0	1	0	0	1	0	1	0	0	1	0	0	0	0	0
Yannick	Flohé	0	0	0	1	1	0	0	0	0	0	0	0	0	1	1
Hans	Florine	0	0	1	0	1	0	0	0	0	0	0	0	1	0	1
Ludovico	Fossali	0	0	1	0	1	0	0	0	0	0	0	0	1	0	1
Kokoro	Fujii	0	1	0	0	1	0	0	0	0	0	0	1	0	0	1
Rustam	Gelmanov	0	1	0	0	1	0	1	0	0	1	0	0	0	0	0
Stefano	Ghisolfi	1	0	0	0	1	1	0	0	0	1	0	0	0	0	0
Alberto	Ginés López	1	0	0	0	1	1	0	0	0	1	0	0	0	0	0
Kai	Harada	0	1	0	0	1	0	0	0	0	0	0	1	0	0	1
Jan	Hojer	0	1	0	0	1	0	1	0	0	1	0	0	0	0	0
Kiromal	Katibin	0	0	1	0	1	0	0	1	0	1	0	0	0	0	0
Jernej	Kruder	0	1	0	0	1	0	1	0	0	1	0	0	0	0	0
Bernardino	Lagni	1	0	0	0	1	0	0	0	0	0	1	0	0	0	1
David	Lama	0	0	0	1	1	0	0	0	1	1	0	0	0	0	0
Do-hyun	Lee	1	0	0	0	1	0	0	0	0	0	1	0	0	0	1
François	Lombard	1	0	0	0	1	1	0	0	0	1	0	0	0	0	0
Jianguo	Long	0	0	1	0	1	0	0	0	0	0	0	0	1	0	1
Simon	Nadin	1	0	0	0	1	1	0	0	0	1	0	0	0	0	0
Mickaël	Mawem	0	1	0	0	1	0	0	0	0	0	0	1	0	0	1
Vladimir	Netsvetaev	0	0	1	0	1	0	0	0	0	0	0	0	1	0	1
Alexander	Peshekhonov	0	0	1	0	1	0	0	1	0	1	0	0	0	0	0
Arnaud	Petit	1	0	0	0	1	1	0	0	0	1	0	0	0	0	0
Pedro	Pons	0	1	0	0	1	0	1	0	0	1	0	0	0	0	0
Luka	Potočar	1	0	0	0	1	1	0	0	0	1	0	0	0	0	0
Gérome	Pouvreau	1	0	0	0	1	0	0	0	0	0	1	0	0	0	1
Salavat	Rakhmetov	0	1	0	0	1	0	0	0	0	0	0	1	0	0	1
Alexey	Rubtsov	0	1	0	0	1	0	0	0	0	0	0	1	0	0	1
Domen	Škofic	1	0	0	0	1	1	0	0	0	1	0	0	0	0	0
Malcolm	Smith	0	1	0	0	1	0	1	0	0	1	0	0	0	0	0
Łukasz	Świrk	0	0	1	0	1	0	0	1	0	1	0	0	0	0	0
Samuel	Watson	0	0	1	0	1	0	0	1	0	1	0	0	0	0	0
Yicheng	Zhao	0	0	1	0	1	0	0	1	0	1	0	0	0	0	0
Vladimir	Zakharov	0	0	1	0	1	0	0	0	0	0	0	0	1	0	1
Matteo	Zurloni	0	0	1	0	1	0	0	0	0	0	0	0	1	0	1
Total		50	41	46	26	163	33	23	28	20	104	17	12	20	6	55

== See also ==
- List of grade milestones in rock climbing
- History of rock climbing
- International Federation of Sport Climbing
- IFSC Climbing World Cup
- IFSC Climbing World Championships
