= 1991 UIAA Climbing World Championships =

- Location: Frankfurt, Germany
- Date: 1 – 2 October 1991
- Competitors: 110 from 22 nations

The 1991 UIAA Climbing World Championships, the first edition, were held in Frankfurt, Germany from 1 to 2 October 1991. It was organized by the Union Internationale des Associations d'Alpinisme (UIAA). The championships consisted of lead and speed events.

== Medalists ==
Event	Gold	Silver	Bronze
Men's Lead	François Legrand; France	Yuji Hirayama; Japan	Guido Köstermeyer; Germany
Men's Speed	Hans Florine; United States	Jacky Godoffe; France	Kairat Rakhmetov; Kazakhstan
Women's Lead	Susi Good; Switzerland	Isabelle Patissier; France	Robyn Erbesfield; United States
Women's Speed	Isabelle Dorsimond; Belgium	Agnès Brard; France	Venera Chereshneva; Russia

== Lead ==
François Legrand and Susi Good were the first ever Lead World Champions. Legrand climbed efficiently and topped the final route.

Men				Women			
Rank	Name	Nation	Result	Rank	Name	Nation	Result
1st place, gold medalist(s)	François Legrand	France	6000	1st place, gold medalist(s)	Susi Good	Switzerland	6000
2nd place, silver medalist(s)	Yuji Hirayama	Japan	4800	2nd place, silver medalist(s)	Isabelle Patissier	France	4800
3rd place, bronze medalist(s)	Guido Köstermeyer	Germany	3600	3rd place, bronze medalist(s)	Robyn Erbesfield	United States	3600
4	Pavel Samoiline	Russia	3300	4	Nanette Raybaud	France	3300
5	Evgeny Ovchinnikov	Russia	3060	5	Lynn Hill	United States	3060
6	Didier Raboutou	France	2820	6	Natalie Richer	France	2820
7	Vladimir Jourkin	Russia	2580	7	Venera Chereshneva	Russia	2580
8	Bernabe Fernandez	Spain	2400	8	Isabelle Dorsimond	Belgium	2400
9	Christoph Finkel	Germany	2220	9	Luisa Iovane	Italy	2220
10	François Lombard	France	2040	10	Barbara Hirschbichler	Germany	2040

== Speed ==
Hans Florine and Isabelle Dorsimond were the first ever Speed World Cup Champions.

Men				Women			
Rank	Name	Nation	Result	Rank	Name	Nation	Result
1st place, gold medalist(s)	Hans Florine	United States	6000	1st place, gold medalist(s)	Isabelle Dorsimond	Belgium	
2nd place, silver medalist(s)	Jacky Godoffe	France	4800	2nd place, silver medalist(s)	Agnès Brard	France	
3rd place, bronze medalist(s)	Kairat Rakhmetov	Kazakhstan	3600	3rd place, bronze medalist(s)	Venera Chereshneva	Russia	
4	Andrzej Marcisz	Poland	3300	4	Yulia Inozemtseva	Russia	
5	Raikhan Galiakbarov	Russia	3060	5	Ineke Dijkstra	Netherlands	
5	Glenn Sutcliffe	Great Britain	3060	5	Andrea Eisenhut	Germany	
7	Mark Baker	Australia	2580	5	Irina Kodina	Russia	
7	Gregor Jaeger	Germany	2580	8	Iwona Gronkiewicz-Marcisz	Poland	
9	Seung-Kwon Chung	South Korea	2220	9	Felicity Butler	Great Britain	
9	Stephan Hilgers	Germany	2220	10	Nancy Feagin	United States	
9	Johannes Nathan	Germany	2220				
9	Petrov Plamen	Bulgaria	2220				
9	Salavat Rakhmetov	Russia	2220				
9	Arnould T'Kint	Belgium	2220				
9	Oleg Tcherechnev	Russia	2220				
16	Hira Verick	Australia	1200				
