= 1995 UIAA Climbing World Championships =

- Location: Geneva, Switzerland
- Date: 5 – 6 May 1995
- Competitors: 135 from 24 nations

The 1995 UIAA Climbing World Championships, the 3rd edition, were held in Geneva, Switzerland from 5 to 6 May 1995. It was organized by the Union Internationale des Associations d'Alpinisme (UIAA). The championships consisted of lead and speed events.

== Medalists ==
Event	Gold	Silver	Bronze
Men's Lead	François Legrand (3); France	Arnaud Petit; France	Elie Chevieux; Switzerland
Men's Speed	Andrey Vedenmeer; Ukraine	Milan Benian; Czech Republic	Vladimir Netsvetaev-Dolgalev; Russia
Women's Lead	Robyn Erbesfield; United States	Laurence Guyon; France	Liv Sansoz; France
Women's Speed	Natalie Richer; France	Cecile Avezou; France	Renata Piszczek; Poland

== Lead ==
François Legrand won and defended his title once again. Robyn Erbesfield took her first Lead World Champion title.

Men				Women			
Rank	Name	Nation	Result	Rank	Name	Nation	Result
1st place, gold medalist(s)	François Legrand	France	8500	1st place, gold medalist(s)	Robyn Erbesfield	United States	8500
2nd place, silver medalist(s)	Arnaud Petit	France	6800	2nd place, silver medalist(s)	Laurence Guyon	France	6800
3rd place, bronze medalist(s)	Elie Chevieux	Switzerland	5525	3rd place, bronze medalist(s)	Liv Sansoz	France	5525
4	François Coffy	France	4675	4	Muriel Sarkany	Belgium	4675
5	François Lombard	France	4335	5	Marie Guillet	France	4335
6	Jean-Baptiste Tribout	France	3995	6	Marietta Uhden	Germany	3995
7	Frédéric Coroller	France	3655	7	Elena Ovtchinnikova	United States	3655
8	Evgeny Ovchinnikov	Russia	3400	8	Natalie Richer	France	3400
9	Marek Havlik	Czech Republic	3145	9	Angela Striecks	Germany	3145
10	Stefan Fürst	Austria	2890	10	Venera Chereshneva	Russia	2890
10	François Petit	France	2890				
10	Pavel Samoiline	Russia	2890				

== Speed ==
Andrey Vedenmeer and Natalie Richer were the 1995 Speed World Cup Champions.

Men			Women		
Rank	Name	Nation	Rank	Name	Nation
1st place, gold medalist(s)	Andrey Vedenmeer	Ukraine	1st place, gold medalist(s)	Natalie Richer	France
2nd place, silver medalist(s)	Milan Benian	Czech Republic	2nd place, silver medalist(s)	Cecile Avezou	France
3rd place, bronze medalist(s)	Vladimir Netsvetaev-Dolgalev	Russia	3rd place, bronze medalist(s)	Renata Piszczek	Poland
4	Yevgen Kryvosheytsev	Ukraine	4	Tatiana Ruyga	Russia
5	Tomasz Oleksy	Poland	5	Anne Arran	Great Britain
5	Johnny Schelker	Switzerland	5	Felicity Butler	Great Britain
7	Neil Carson	Great Britain	5	Metka Lukancic	Slovenia
7	Milen Videnovski	Bulgaria	5	Irina Zaytseva	Russia
9	Nenco Dunev	Bulgaria	9	Martina Cufar	Slovenia
10	Vili Gucek	Slovenia	10	Elena Cioroianu	Romania
