= 2001 UIAA Climbing World Championships =

Speed climbing championships

- Location: Winterthur, Switzerland
- Date: 5 – 8 September 2001
- Competitors: 198 from 25 nations

The 2001 UIAA Climbing World Championships, the 6th edition, were held in Winterthur, Switzerland from 5 to 8 September 2001. It was organized by the Union Internationale des Associations d'Alpinisme (UIAA). The championships consisted of lead, speed, and bouldering events. Bouldering was added as a new event.

== Medalists ==
Event	Gold	Silver	Bronze
Men's Lead	Gérome Pouvreau; France	Tomas Mrazek; Czech Republic	François Petit; France
Men's Bouldering	Mauro Calibani; Italy	Frédéric Tuscan; France	Christian Core; Italy
Men's Speed	Maksym Styenkovyy; Ukraine	Vladimir Zakharov; Ukraine	Tomasz Oleksy; Poland
Women's Lead	Martina Cufar; Slovenia	Muriel Sarkany; Belgium	Chloé Minoret; France
Women's Bouldering	Myriam Motteau; France	Sandrine Levet; France	Nataliya Perlova; Ukraine
Women's Speed	Olena Ryepko; Ukraine	Maya Piratinskaya; Russia	Svetlana Sutkina; Russia

== Schedule ==
Date	Time	Event
6 Sep 2001 (Thu)	12-18h	Lead Quarter-finals
6 Sep 2001 (Thu)	19-22h	Speed Qualifications
7 Sep 2001 (Fri)	10-17h	Bouldering Qualifications
7 Sep 2001 (Fri)	18-22h	Lead Semi-finals
8 Sep 2001 (Sat)	13-16h	Bouldering Finals
8 Sep 2001 (Sat)	17-19h	Speed Finals
8 Sep 2001 (Sat)	20-22h	Lead Finals
8 Sep 2001 (Sat)	22h	Award Ceremony, Party

== Lead ==
=== Men ===
The 18-year-old Frenchman Gérome Pouvreau won the Lead World Champion title. Tomáš Mrázek, although reached Pouvreau's high-point on the final route, placed second due to count-back to the semi-final results. François Petit claimed the bronze medal.

Rank	Name	Nation	Final	1/2 Final	1/4 Final	
Rank	Name	Nation	Final	1/2 Final	Route 1	Route 2
1st place, gold medalist(s)	Gérome Pouvreau	France	20.88	23.75		Top
2nd place, silver medalist(s)	Tomáš Mrázek	Czech Republic	20.88	23.75-		17.15-
3rd place, bronze medalist(s)	François Petit	France	19.39-	22.30-		Top
4	Alexandre Chabot	France	18.33-	24.31-		17.15-
5	Yuji Hirayama	Japan	18.33-	22.10-	Top	
6	Ramón Julián Puigblanqué	Spain	13.55	21.18	17.48-	
7	Christian Bindhammer	Germany	13.07+	21.18	Top	
8	Bernardino Lagni	Italy	13.07	22.30+	Top	
9	Evgeny Ovchinnikov	Russia	12.47+	22.10	19.59-	

=== Women ===
Martina Cufar won the Lead World Champion title. Muriel Sarkany placed second while Chloé Minoret placed third.

Rank	Name	Nation	Final	1/2 Final	1/4 Final
1st place, gold medalist(s)	Martina Cufar	Slovenia	22.96	Top	Top
2nd place, silver medalist(s)	Muriel Sarkany	Belgium	22.96-	Top	Top
3rd place, bronze medalist(s)	Chloé Minoret	France	21.72-	Top	Top
4	Bettina Schöpf	Austria	20.17-	Top	Top
5	Olga Iakovleva	Russia	18.88-	Top	Top
5	Jenny Lavarda	Italy	18.88-	Top	Top
7	Marietta Uhden	Germany	18.64+	Top	Top
8	Katrin Sedlmayer	Germany	16.36	Top	Top
9	Rie Kimura	Japan	16.36-	Top	Top
10	Annatina Schultz	Switzerland	16.19+	Top	Top
11	Mi-Sun Go	South Korea	15.74	Top	Top
11	Elena Ovtchinnikova	United States	15.74	Top	Top
13	Damaris Knorr	Germany	14.96	Top	Top
14	Venera Chereshneva	Russia	13.40-	Top	Top

== Bouldering ==
=== Men ===
Mauro Calibani became the first ever male Bouldering World Champion. Frédéric Tuscan and Christian Core placed second and third respectively.

Rank	Name	Nation	Final Rank	Qual. Rank
1st place, gold medalist(s)	Mauro Calibani	Italy	1	2.
2nd place, silver medalist(s)	Frédéric Tuscan	France	2	8.
3rd place, bronze medalist(s)	Christian Core	Italy	3	1.
4	Daniel Du Lac	France	4	4.
5	Jérôme Meyer	France	5	3.
6	Daniel Andrada Jimenez	Spain	6	6.
7	Salavat Rakhmetov	Russia	7	6.
8	Karsten Borowka	Germany	8	14.
9	Jurij Golob	Slovenia	9	5.
10	Kilian Fischhuber	Austria	10	17.
11	Mykhaylo Shalagin	Ukraine	11	19.
12	Jean Baptiste Jourjon	France	12	9.
13	Wouter Jongeneelen	Netherlands	13	10.
14	Gareth Parry	Great Britain	14	11.
15	Petro Markevych	Ukraine	15	13.
16	Stephane Julien	France	16	16.
17	Raphaël Lachat	Switzerland	17	12.
18	Yevgen Kryvosheytsev	Ukraine	18	15.
19	Kyrylo Shevchenko	Ukraine	19	20.
20	Juraj Repcik	Slovakia	20	18.

=== Women ===
Myriam Motteau became the first ever female Bouldering World Champion. Sandrine Levet and Nataliya Perlova placed second and third respectively.

Rank	Name	Nation	Final Rank	Qual. Rank
1st place, gold medalist(s)	Myriam Motteau	France	1	3.
2nd place, silver medalist(s)	Sandrine Levet	France	2	1.
3rd place, bronze medalist(s)	Nataliya Perlova	Ukraine	3	16.
4	Nicola Haager	Germany	4	8.
5	Corinne Theroux	France	5	10.
6	Renata Piszczek	Poland	6	1.
7	Emilie Pouget	France	7	6.
8	Leire Aguirre	Spain	8	3.
9	Ruth Plannels	Spain	9	13.
10	Eva Nieselt	Germany	10	15.
11	Helena Lipenska	Czech Republic	11	8.
12	Isabella Ritsch	Austria	12	5.
13	Olga Bibik	Russia	13	7.
14	Cinzia Donati	Italy	14	18.
15	Yulia Abramchuk	Russia	15	13.
16	Zuzana Cintalova	Slovakia	16	20.
17	Tanja Bauer	Germany	17	17.
18	Iwona Gronkiewicz-Marcisz	Poland	18	12.
19	Nienke Swart	Netherlands	19	19.
20	Venera Chereshneva	Russia	20	11.

== Speed ==
=== Men ===
Maksym Styenkovyy claimed the Speed World Champion title. Vladimir Zakharov and Tomasz Oleksy placed second and third respectively.

Rank	Name	Nation	Final	small Final	1/2-Final
1st place, gold medalist(s)	Maksym Styenkovyy	Ukraine	30.24	19.34	21.23
2nd place, silver medalist(s)	Vladimir Zakharov	Ukraine	elim.	19.58	24.72
3rd place, bronze medalist(s)	Tomasz Oleksy	Poland		19.44	21.41
4	Alexandre Chaoulsky	Russia		19.75	23.95
5	Yevgen Kryvosheytsev	Ukraine			26.72
6	Oleg Grebenyuk	Ukraine			23.16
7	Alexei Gadeev	Russia			24.62
8	Raphaël Lachat	Switzerland			33.14
9	Vladimir Netsvetaev-Dolgalev	Russia			23.22
10	Csaba Komondi	Hungary			25.25
11	Andrei Krivonos	Ukraine			27.33
12	Ihor Honcharenko	Ukraine			29.04
13	Vladislav Baranov	Russia			30.48
14	Milen Videnovski	Bulgaria			30.84
15	Kalin Garbov	Bulgaria			36.58
16	Urs Schönenberger	Switzerland			36.67

=== Women ===
Olena Ryepko claimed the Speed World Champion title. Mayya Piratinskaya and Svetlana Sutkina placed second and third respectively.

Rank	Name	Nation	Final	small Final
1st place, gold medalist(s)	Olena Ryepko	Ukraine	37.03	43.09
2nd place, silver medalist(s)	Mayya Piratinskaya	Russia	37.73	38.94
3rd place, bronze medalist(s)	Svetlana Sutkina	Russia		elim.
4	Anna Stenkovaya	Russia		41.28
5	Olga Zakharova	Ukraine		
6	Nataliya Perlova	Ukraine		
7	Zosia Podgorbounskikh	Russia		
8	Renata Piszczek	Poland		
