= World Climbing Championship =

Biennial event

Seasons
- 1991; 1993; 1995; 1997; 1999; 2001; 2003; 2005; 2007; 2009; 2011; 2012; 2014; 2016; 2018; 2019; 2021; 2023; 2025

Disciplines
- Lead; Bouldering; Speed; Combined

Most gold medals
- (Slovenia) Janja Garnbret (10)

World Climbing Championship, formerly known as the IFSC Climbing World Championship, is the biennial world championship event for competition climbing that is organized by World Climbing. This event determines the male and female world champions in the three disciplines of competition climbing: competition lead climbing, competition bouldering, and competition speed climbing. From 2012 to 2023, a combined ranking was also determined, for climbers competing in all disciplines, and additional medals were awarded based on that ranking. The first event was organized in Frankfurt in 1991.

== History ==
=== Creation and organizers ===
In 1991, the Union Internationale des Associations d'Alpinisme (UIAA) organized the competition climbing championships. The International Council for Competition Climbing (ICC) was created in 1997 as an internal body of the UIAA to take charge of competition climbing.

In 2007, the independent IFSC was created as a continuation of the ICC to govern competition climbing.

In 2025, the event was renamed World Climbing Championship, following IFSC's renaming to World Climbing.

=== Events ===
The present format has four disciplines: lead, speed, bouldering, and combined.

The first championships had two events: lead and speed. Bouldering was added in 2001.

In 2012, 2014 and 2016, a combined ranking (sometimes also called overall ranking) was computed for climbers participating in all of the three events. In 2018, a specific combined event was included which the six climbers with highest overall ranking were invited to enter. The combined event requires athletes to compete in all three disciplines, and they receive a single combined score based on all three results. Scores achieved in single-discipline events are not relevant to the combined score, and there are no awards for any one part of the combined event. The 2018 combined event tested the new Olympic Games format, which was used at the first appearance of climbing at the Olympics in 2020. In 2019 the Combined competition was held again with the best eight men's and women's athletes receiving invitations to the 2020 Olympics.

In 2011, the IFSC Paraclimbing World Championships were established. The event is usually held alongside the open class competition. Para athletes compete in lead only, except for 2011 when a speed climbing competition was held as well.

=== Years ===
The World Championships are held every two years. Twice, the cycle has been moved to the other year and in those cases this was done by holding the next championship one year earlier. In 2012 the World Championships were shifted to even years to avoid interference with the 2013 World Games climbing event and to give a supplementary opportunity to demonstrate the sport for a possible integration into the 2020 Olympic Games. In 2019 the World Championships were again held one year early, to now allow the Championships to be the year before each Olympics to operate as a qualifier event.

== Championships ==
Edition	Year	Location	Date(s)	Disciplines						Athletes	Nations	Website	Notes
Edition	Year	Location	Date(s)	Event	L	S	B	C	Para	Athletes	Nations	Website	Notes
1	1991	(Germany) Frankfurt	1–2 October	2	X	X	-	-	-	110	22		
2	1993	(Austria) Innsbruck	29–30 April	2	X	X	-	-	-	127	23		
3	1995	(Switzerland) Geneva	5–6 May	2	X	X	-	-	-	135	24		
4	1997	(France) Paris	31 January–1 February	2	X	X	-	-	-	153	26		
5	1999	(United Kingdom) Birmingham	2–3 December	2	X	X	-	-	-	180	30		
6	2001	(Switzerland) Winterthur	5–8 September	3	X	X	X	-	-	198	25		
7	2003	(France) Chamonix	9–13 July	3	X	X	X	-	-	241	34		
8	2005	(Germany) Munich	1–5 July	3	X	X	X	-	-	318	51		
9	2007	(Spain) Avilés	17–23 September	3	X	X	X	-	-	302	50		
10	2009	(China) Xining	30 June – 5 July	4	X	X	X	-	-	219	44		
11	2011	(Italy) Arco	15–24 July	4	X	X	X	-	X	374	56		
12	2012	(France) Paris	12–16 September	5	X	X	X	X	X	331	56		
13	2014	(Germany) Munich	21–23 August	1	-	-	X	-	-	509	52		
13	2014	(Spain) Gijón	8–14 September	4	X	X	-	X	X	509	52		
14	2016	(France) Paris	14–18 September	5	X	X	X	X	X	533	53		
15	2018	(Austria) Innsbruck	6–16 September	5	X	X	X	X	X	834	58		
16	2019	(France) Briançon	16–17 July	1	-	-	-	-	X				
16	2019	(Japan) Hachioji	11–21 August	4	X	X	X	X	-	253	39		
17	2021	(Russia) Moscow	15–21 September	5	X	X	X	X	X				
18	2023	(Switzerland) Bern	1–12 August	5	X	X	X	X	X				
19	2025	(South Korea) Seoul	21-28 September	4	X	X	X		X				
20	2027	(Czech Republic) Brno	13-21 August	5	X	X	X	X	X				

== Medals ==
As of 2025 IFSC Climbing World Championships (excluding paraclimbing medals)

Rank	Nation	Gold	Silver	Bronze	Total
1	Russia	16	14	23	53
2	Austria	15	7	8	30
3	France	14	19	17	50
4	Slovenia	11	8	5	24
5	Ukraine	11	7	5	23
6	Japan	7	10	9	26
7	Czech Republic	6	10	4	20
8	China	6	5	2	13
9	Poland	6	4	9	19
10	Italy	6	1	2	9
11	South Korea	4	5	6	15
12	Spain	4	5	0	9
13	United States	3	9	6	18
14	Switzerland	3	1	5	9
15	Canada	3	1	0	4
16	Germany	2	6	9	17
17	Belgium	2	6	0	8
18	Iran	1	1	2	4
19	Indonesia	1	0	1	2
20	Kazakhstan	0	1	3	4
21	Venezuela	0	1	0	1
22	Great Britain	0	0	4	4
23	Serbia	0	0	2	2
24	Netherlands	0	0	1	1
Totals (24 entries)		121	121	123	365

Note 1: share medals in 2007 IFSC Climbing World Championships

Note 2: one silver medal in 2021 IFSC Climbing World Championships for Climbing Federation of Russia

== Men's results ==
=== Lead ===
Year	Gold	Silver	Bronze
1991	(France) François Legrand	(Japan) Yuji Hirayama	(Germany) Guido Köstermeyer
1993	(France) François Legrand (2)	(Germany) Stefan Glowacz	(Japan) Yuji Hirayama
1995	(France) François Legrand (3)	(France) Arnaud Petit	(Switzerland) Elie Chevieux
1997	(France) François Petit	(United States) Chris Sharma	(France) François Legrand
1999	(Italy) Bernardino Lagni	(Japan) Yuji Hirayama	(Ukraine) Maksym Petrenko
2001	(France) Gérôme Pouvreau	(Czech Republic) Tomáš Mrázek	(France) François Petit
2003	(Czech Republic) Tomáš Mrázek	(Spain) Patxi Usobiaga	(France) David Caude
2005	(Czech Republic) Tomáš Mrázek (2)	(Spain) Patxi Usobiaga	(France) Alexandre Chabot
2007	(Spain) Ramón Julián	(Spain) Patxi Usobiaga	(Switzerland) Cédric Lachat (Czech Republic) Tomáš Mrázek (Netherlands) Jorg Verhoeven
2009	(Spain) Patxi Usobiaga	(Czech Republic) Adam Ondra	(Austria) David Lama
2011	(Spain) Ramón Julián (2)	(Austria) Jakob Schubert	(Czech Republic) Adam Ondra
2012	(Austria) Jakob Schubert	(Canada) Sean McColl	(Czech Republic) Adam Ondra
2014	(Czech Republic) Adam Ondra	(Spain) Ramón Julián	(Japan) Sachi Amma
2016	(Czech Republic) Adam Ondra (2)	(Austria) Jakob Schubert	(France) Gautier Supper
2018	(Austria) Jakob Schubert (2)	(Czech Republic) Adam Ondra	(Germany) Alexander Megos
2019	(Czech Republic) Adam Ondra (3)	(Germany) Alexander Megos	(Austria) Jakob Schubert
2021	(Austria) Jakob Schubert (3)	(Slovenia) Luka Potočar	(United Kingdom) Hamish McArthur
2023	(Austria) Jakob Schubert (4)	(Japan) Sorato Anraku	(Germany) Alexander Megos
2025	(South Korea) Lee Do-hyun	(Japan) Satone Yoshida	(Japan) Taisei Homma

=== Speed ===
Year	Gold	Silver	Bronze
1991	(United States) Hans Florine	(France) Jacky Godoffe	(Kazakhstan) Kairat Rachmetov
1993	(Russia) Vladimir Netsvetaïev	(Ukraine) Serik Kazbekov	(Ukraine) Yevgen Kryvosheytsev
1995	(Ukraine) Andrey Vedenmeer	(Czech Republic) Milan Benian	(Russia) Vladimir Netsvetaïev
1997	(Spain) Daniel Andrada	(Ukraine) Yevgen Kryvosheytsev	(Russia) Dmitrij Byčkov
1999	(Ukraine) Vladimir Zakharov	(Russia) Vladimir Netsvetaïev	(Russia) Alexey Gadeev
2001	(Ukraine) Maksym Styenkovyy	(Ukraine) Vladimir Zakharov	(Poland) Tomasz Oleksy
2003	(Ukraine) Maksym Styenkovyy (2)	(Poland) Tomasz Oleksy	(Russia) Alexandr Pechekhonov
2005	(Russia) Evgeny Vaitcekhovsky	(Ukraine) Maksym Styenkovyy	(Russia) Sergey Sinitsyn
2007	(China) Zhong Qixin	(Venezuela) Manuel Escobar	(Russia) Sergey Sinitsyn
2009 (10 m)	(China) Zhong Qixin (2)	(Kazakhstan) Alexandr Nigmatulin	(Russia) Ivan Novikov
2009 (15 m)	(China) Zhong Qixin (3)	(Russia) Sergey Abdrakhmanov	(China) Ning Zhang
2011	(China) Zhong Qixin (4)	(Russia) Stanislav Kokorin	(Ukraine) Danyil Boldyrev
2012	(China) Zhong Qixin (5)	(Czech Republic) Libor Hroza	(Russia) Dmitry Timofeev
2014	(Ukraine) Danyil Boldyrev	(Russia) Stanislav Kokorin	(Iran) Reza Alipour
2016	(Poland) Marcin Dzieński	(Iran) Reza Alipour	(Russia) Alexandr Shikov
2018	(Iran) Reza Alipour	(France) Bassa Mawem	(Russia) Stanislav Kokorin
2019	(Italy) Ludovico Fossali	(Czech Republic) Jan Kříž	(Russia) Stanislav Kokorin
2021	(Ukraine) Danyil Boldyrev (2)	(Spain) Erik Noya Cardona	(United States) Noah Bratschi
2023	(Italy) Matteo Zurloni	(China) Long Jinbao	(Indonesia) Rahmad Adi Mulyono
2025	(China) Long Jianguo	(Germany) Leander Carmanns	(United States) Zach Hammer

=== Bouldering ===
Year	Gold	Silver	Bronze
2001	(Italy) Mauro Calibani	(France) Frédéric Tuscan	(Italy) Christian Core
2003	(Italy) Christian Core	(France) Jérôme Meyer	(Poland) Tomasz Oleksy
2005	(Russia) Salavat Rachmetov	(Austria) Kilian Fischhuber	(France) Gérôme Pouvreau
2007	(Russia) Dmitri Sarafutdinov	(Czech Republic) Martin Stráník	(Switzerland) Cédric Lachat
2009	(Russia) Alexey Rubtsov	(Russia) Rustam Gelmanov	(United Kingdom) David Barrans
2011	(Russia) Dmitri Sarafutdinov (2)	(Czech Republic) Adam Ondra	(Russia) Rustam Gelmanov
2012	(Russia) Dmitri Sarafutdinov (3)	(Austria) Kilian Fischhuber	(Russia) Rustam Gelmanov
2014	(Czech Republic) Adam Ondra	(Slovenia) Jernej Kruder	(Germany) Jan Hojer
2016	(Japan) Tomoa Narasaki	(Czech Republic) Adam Ondra	(France) Manuel Cornu
2018	(Japan) Kai Harada	(South Korea) Jongwon Chon	(Slovenia) Gregor Vezonik
2019	(Japan) Tomoa Narasaki (2)	(Austria) Jakob Schubert	(Germany) Yannick Flohé
2021	(Japan) Kokoro Fujii	(Japan) Tomoa Narasaki	(France) Manuel Cornu
2023	(France) Mickael Mawem	(France) Mejdi Schalck	(South Korea) Lee Do-hyun
2025	(Japan) Sorato Anraku	(France) Mejdi Schalck	(South Korea) Lee Do-hyun

=== Combined ===
Year	Gold	Silver	Bronze
2012	(Canada) Sean McColl	(Germany) Thomas Tauporn	(Switzerland) Cédric Lachat
2014	(Canada) Sean McColl (2)	(Germany) Jan Hojer	(France) Alban Levier
2016	(Canada) Sean McColl (3)	(France) Manuel Cornu	(Germany) David Firnenburg
2018	(Austria) Jakob Schubert	(Czech Republic) Adam Ondra	(Germany) Jan Hojer
2019	(Japan) Tomoa Narasaki	(Austria) Jakob Schubert	(Kazakhstan) Rishat Khaibullin
2021	(Germany) Yannick Flohé	(Germany) Philipp Martin	(Ukraine) Fedir Samoilov
2023	(Austria) Jakob Schubert (2)	(United States) Colin Duffy	(Japan) Tomoa Narasaki

== Women's Results ==
=== Lead ===
Year	Gold	Silver	Bronze
1991	(Switzerland) Susi Good	(France) Isabelle Patissier	(United States) Robyn Erbesfield
1993	(Switzerland) Susi Good (2)	(United States) Robyn Erbesfield	(France) Isabelle Patissier
1995	(United States) Robyn Erbesfield	(France) Laurence Guyon	(France) Liv Sansoz
1997	(France) Liv Sansoz	(Belgium) Muriel Sarkany	(Germany) Marietta Uhden
1999	(France) Liv Sansoz (2)	(Belgium) Muriel Sarkany	(United States) Yelena Ovchinnikova
2001	(Slovenia) Martina Čufar	(Belgium) Muriel Sarkany	(France) Chloé Minoret
2003	(Belgium) Muriel Sarkany	(France) Emilie Pouget	(France) Sandrine Levet
2005	(Austria) Angela Eiter	(United States) Emily Harrington	(Japan) Akiyo Noguchi
2007	(Austria) Angela Eiter (2)	(Belgium) Muriel Sarkany	(Slovenia) Maja Vidmar
2009	(Austria) Johanna Ernst	(South Korea) Kim Ja-in	(Slovenia) Maja Vidmar
2011	(Austria) Angela Eiter (3)	(South Korea) Kim Ja-in	(Austria) Magdalena Röck
2012	(Austria) Angela Eiter (4)	(South Korea) Kim Ja-in	(Austria) Johanna Ernst
2014	(South Korea) Kim Ja-in	(Slovenia) Mina Markovič	(Austria) Magdalena Röck
2016	(Slovenia) Janja Garnbret	(Belgium) Anak Verhoeven	(Slovenia) Mina Markovič
2018	(Austria) Jessica Pilz	(Slovenia) Janja Garnbret	(South Korea) Kim Ja-in
2019	(Slovenia) Janja Garnbret (2)	(Slovenia) Mia Krampl	(Japan) Ai Mori
2021	(South Korea) Seo Chae-hyun	(United States) Natalia Grossman	(Italy) Laura Rogora
2023	(Japan) Ai Mori	(Slovenia) Janja Garnbret	(South Korea) Seo Chae-hyun
2025	(Slovenia) Janja Garnbret (3)	(Slovenia) Rosa Rekar	(South Korea) Seo Chae-hyun

=== Speed ===
Year	Gold	Silver	Bronze
1991	(Belgium) Isabelle Dorsimond	(France) Agnès Brard	(Russia) Venera Chereshneva
1993	(Russia) Olga Bibik	(Belgium) Isabelle Dorsimond	(Poland) Renata Piszczek
1995	(France) Natalie Richer	(France) Cécile Avezou	(Poland) Renata Piszczek
1997	(Russia) Tatiana Ruyga	(Russia) Irina Zaytseva	(Russia) Olga Bibik
1999	(Ukraine) Olga Zakharova	(Ukraine) Olena Ryepko	(Russia) Natalia Novikova
2001	(Ukraine) Olena Ryepko	(Russia) Maya Piratinskaya	(Russia) Svetlana Sutkina
2003	(Ukraine) Olena Ryepko (2)	(Russia) Tatiana Ruyga	(Russia) Valentina Yurina
2005	(Ukraine) Olena Ryepko (3)	(Russia) Valentina Yurina	(Poland) Edyta Ropek
2007	(Russia) Tatiana Ruyga (2)	(Poland) Edyta Ropek	(Russia) Valentina Yurina
2009 (10 m)	(China) He Cuilian	(China) He Cuifang	(China) Li Chunhua
2009 (15 m)	(China) He Cuilian (2)	(China) He Cuifang	(China) Li Chunhua
2011	(Russia) Maria Krasavina	(Russia) Anna Tsyganova	(Kazakhstan) Tamara Kuznetsova
2012	(Russia) Yulia Levochkina	(Russia) Iuliia Kaplina	(Russia) Natalia Titova
2014	(Russia) Alina Gaidamakina	(Poland) Klaudia Buczek	(Poland) Aleksandra Rudzińska (later with last name: Mirosław)
2016	(Russia) Anna Tsyganova	(France) Anouck Jaubert	(Russia) Iuliia Kaplina
2018	(Poland) Aleksandra Mirosław	(Poland) Anna Brożek	(Russia) Maria Krasavina
2019	(Poland) Aleksandra Mirosław (2)	(China) Di Niu	(France) Anouck Jaubert
2021	(Poland) Natalia Kałucka	Iuliia Kaplina	(Poland) Aleksandra Mirosław
2023	(Indonesia) Desak Made Rita Kusuma Dewi	(United States) Emma Hunt	(Poland) Aleksandra Mirosław
2025	(Poland) Aleksandra Mirosław (3)	(China) Deng Lijuan	(China) Zhou Yafei

=== Bouldering ===
Year	Gold	Silver	Bronze
2001	(France) Myriam Motteau	(France) Sandrine Levet	(Ukraine) Nataliya Perlova
2003	(France) Sandrine Levet	(Ukraine) Nataliya Perlova	(France) Fanny Rogeaux
2005	(Ukraine) Olga Shalagina	(Russia) Julija Abramčuková	(Czech Republic) Věra Kotasová-Kostruhová
2007	(Austria) Anna Stöhr	(Japan) Akiyo Noguchi	(Russia) Olga Bibik
2009	(Russia) Julija Abramčuková	(Ukraine) Olga Shalagina	(Austria) Anna Stöhr
2011	(Austria) Anna Stöhr (2)	(United States) Sasha DiGiulian	(Germany) Juliane Wurm
2012	(France) Mélanie Sandoz	(Russia) Olga Yakovleva	(Austria) Anna Stöhr
2014	(Germany) Juliane Wurm	(United States) Alex Puccio	(Japan) Akiyo Noguchi
2016	(Switzerland) Petra Klingler	(Japan) Miho Nonaka	(Japan) Akiyo Noguchi
2018	(Slovenia) Janja Garnbret	(Japan) Akiyo Noguchi	(Serbia) Staša Gejo
2019	(Slovenia) Janja Garnbret (2)	(Japan) Akiyo Noguchi	(United Kingdom) Shauna Coxsey
2021	(United States) Natalia Grossman	(Italy) Camilla Moroni	(Serbia) Staša Gejo
2023	(Slovenia) Janja Garnbret (3)	(France) Oriane Bertone	(United States) Brooke Raboutou
2025	(Slovenia) Janja Garnbret (4)	(France) Oriane Bertone	(United States) Melina Costanza

=== Combined ===
Year	Gold	Silver	Bronze
2012	(South Korea) Kim Ja-in	(France) Cécile Avezou	(Switzerland) Petra Klingler
2014	(France) Charlotte Durif	(Switzerland) Petra Klingler	(Slovenia) Mina Markovič
2016	(Russia) Jelena Krasovská	(United States) Claire Buhrfeind	(France) Charlotte Durif
2018	(Slovenia) Janja Garnbret	(South Korea) Sa Sol	(Austria) Jessica Pilz
2019	(Slovenia) Janja Garnbret (2)	(Japan) Akiyo Noguchi	(United Kingdom) Shauna Coxsey
2021	(Austria) Jessica Pilz	(Slovenia) Mia Krampl	(Iran) Elnaz Rekabi
2023	(Slovenia) Janja Garnbret (3)	(Austria) Jessica Pilz	(Japan) Ai Mori

== See also ==
- World Climbing Series
- IFSC Paraclimbing World Championships
- IFSC Climbing World Youth Championships
- World Climbing European Championships
- IFSC Climbing Asian Championships
- List of best IFSC results
- UIAA Ice Climbing World Championships
