= Hans Florine =

American rock climber (born 1964)

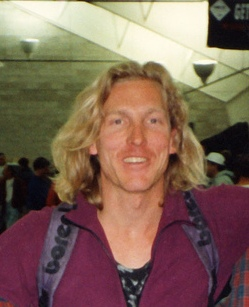
- Florine in 1995

Personal information
- Nickname: Hollywood Hans
- Born: June 18, 1964 (age 62)
- Occupations: Professional climbing and speaker
- Height: 6 ft 1 in (185 cm)
- Website: hansflorine.com

Climbing career
- Type of climber: Competition speed climbing; Big wall climbing; Speed climbing
- Known for: Fastest ascent of The Nose of El Capitan
Medal record
Men's competition climbing
Representing United States
World Championships
Gold medal – first place	1991 Frankfurt	Speed

Hans Florine (born June 18, 1964) is an American rock climber and competition speed climber, who holds the record for the number of big wall climbing ascents of Yosemite Valley's El Capitan, and is known for holding the speed record on The Nose of Yosemite’s El Capitan 8 different times. Hans' last speed record on The Nose was accomplished with Alex Honnold for climbing The Nose in 2:23:46 (2 hours, 23 minutes and 46 seconds), on June 17, 2012. In addition to climbing El Capitan over 175 times, Hans also holds the record for the number of ascents of The Nose, climbing it more than 111 times.

El Capitan is traditionally climbed in three to five days. The Nose route is 2,900 ft long (880 m) and features 31 pitches of strenuous, exposed climbing. This translates to a rate of roughly 5 minutes per pitch.

Florine pioneered many of the methods currently used in speed climbing.

== Climbing career ==
Florine started climbing as a teenager in 1983, and began competing in bouldering and speed competitions by 1986 at a time when competition climbing was not popular. He found that by speed climbing in competitions he was able to earn some gear and a tiny bit of money to fund his climbing, and by climbing quickly he could simply get more climbing in.

In 1990 Hans teamed up with Steve Schneider to climb The Nose route in a record 8 hours and 6 minutes. Approximately one week later Dave Schultz and Peter Croft climbed The Nose in 6 hours and 40 minutes. The following year, 1991, Hans teamed up with Andres Puhvel and they climbed The Nose in 6:01. Approximately one week later Schultz and Croft climbed The Nose in 4:48. The following year Hans met Peter Croft at a slide show and suggested they climb The Nose together, and so they did.

Hans broke The Nose speed record with Yuji Hirayama in 2002, with a time of 2:48:55. This was bested by German brothers Alexander Huber and Thomas Huber in 2007, however, Florine and Hirayama regained the record with a time of 2:43:33 just six months later. They improved again to set a time of 2:37:05 (2 hours, 37 minutes and 5 seconds), on October 12, 2008.

On July 30, 2005, Florine also completed a solo ascent of The Nose in just 11 hours and 41 minutes. Solo ascents are characterized by climbing by yourself while using a rope for protection, and require one person to do all the work.

In 2018 he broke both his legs during a training run up The Nose after a piece of protection popped out of a crack. He and his partner Abraham Shreve were rescued by Yosemite Search and Rescue the next day.

=== Race against Pedro Hoffmeister ===
On May 18, 2019, Florine and Pete "Pedro" Hoffmeister raced in a NIAD ("Nose In A Day" - 3000 feet of rock climbing in one day). The race was titled "Super Local vs. Super Pro," and took place at The Columns, Skinner's Butte Park, in Eugene, Oregon. Both climbers were coming back from devastating injuries. Hoffmeister had the advantage of knowing all of the routes. Florine did not know the routes. Hoffmeister won the race, climbing 3000 feet, 64 routes, in 2:05:55. Florine clocked 2:27:05.

=== Notable ascents ===
- The Nose of El Capitan: Former speed record with Steve Schneider, 1990. Time: 8:06
- The Nose of El Capitan: Former speed record with Andres Puhvel, 1991. Time: 6:01
- The Nose of El Capitan: Former speed record with Peter Croft, 1992. Time: 4:22
- The Nose of El Capitan: Former speed record with Jim Herson, 2001. Time: 3:57:27
- The Nose of El Capitan: Former speed record with Yuji Hirayama, 2002. Time: 2:48:55
- The Nose of El Capitan: Former speed record with Yuji Hirayama, July 2, 2008. Time: 2:43:33
- The Nose of El Capitan: Former speed record with Yuji Hirayama, October 12, 2008. Time: 2:37:05
- The Nose of El Capitan: Former speed record with Alex Honnold, June 17, 2012. Time: 2:23:46 or 2:23:51

=== Competition Climbing ===
Florine has been climbing competitively since 1987. He has won 3 gold medals in X-Game speed climbing, in 1995, 1996 and 1997. He also won the US National championships at City Rock in Emeryville CA in 1990. He won two other national events in difficulty climbing, as well as 12 national titles in speed climbing. Hans won the first ever World Championships in Speed Climbing in Frankfurt Germany in 1991.

From 1991 until 1995 Hans was the Executive Director of the American Sport Climbing Federation (ASCF). The ASCF was formed from a committee that was part of the American Alpine Club. Hans, along with Randy Hart organized and supported the first US Junior National Competition. The offshoot from that was the formation of the Junior Competitive Climbing Association, JCCA, which later eclipsed the ASCF, and effectively adopted it back in to form what later became https://usaclimbing.org/

== Books ==
- Climb On! Skills for More Efficient Climbing (How To Climb Series), Hans Florine with Bill Wright, Falcon Guides, 2001
- Speed Climbing!, 2nd: How to Climb Faster and Better (How To Climb Series), Hans Florine with Bill Wright, Falcon Guides, 2004
- On the Nose: A Lifelong Obsession with Yosemite’s Most Iconic Climb, Hans Florine with Jayme Moye, Falcon Guides, 2016
