= Robyn Erbesfield-Raboutou =

American rock climber

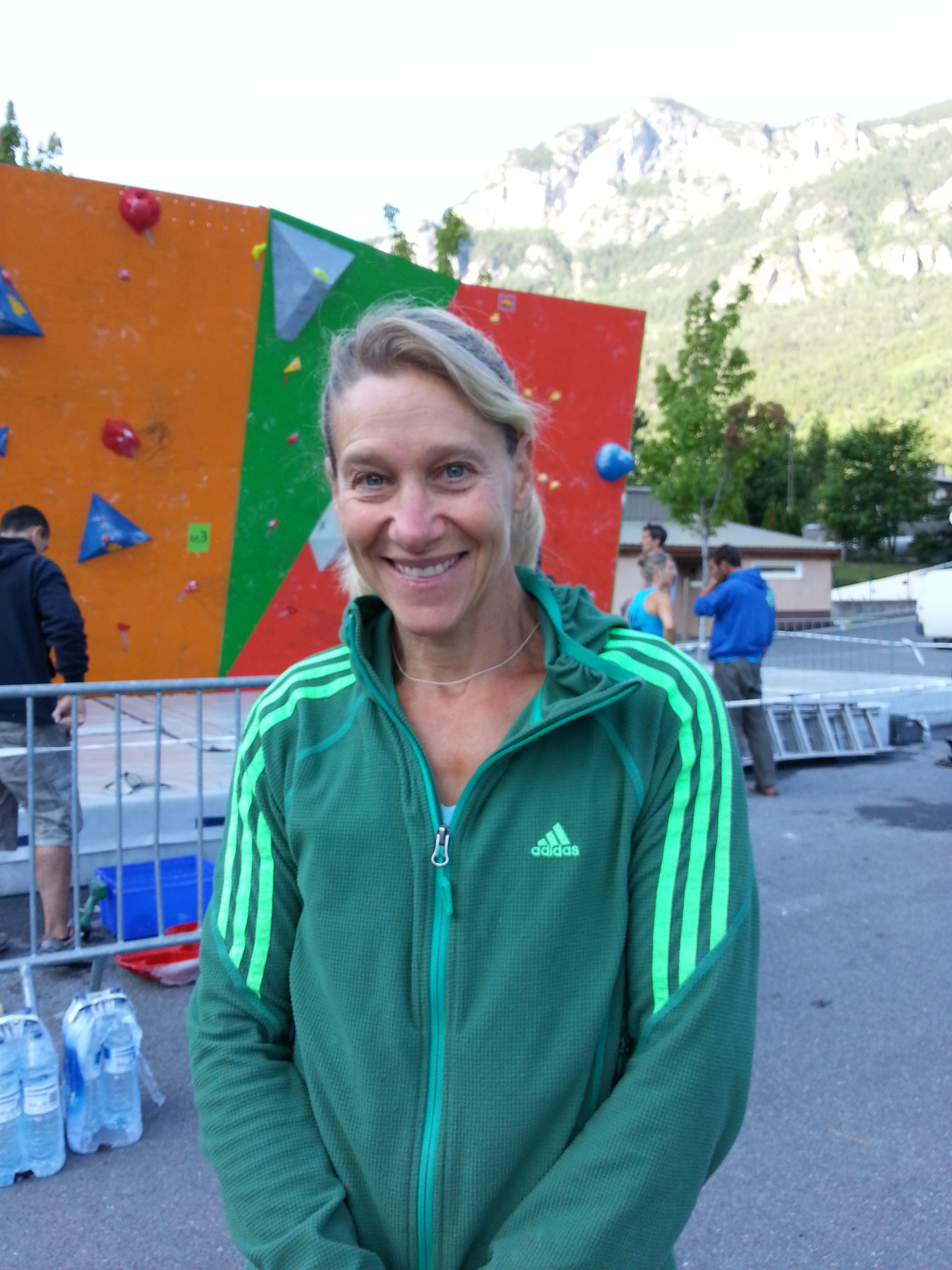

Personal information
- Nationality: American
- Born: May 8, 1963 (age 63) Atlanta, Georgia
- Occupation: Rock climbing coach
- Height: 1.57 m (5 ft 2 in)
- Weight: 43 kg (95 lb)
- Website: raboutoufamily.blogspot.com

Climbing career
- Type of climber: Competition lead climbing; sport climbing
- Highest grade: Redpoint: 5.14b (8c); Bouldering: V12 (8A+)
- Known for: Winning 4 World Cups and 1 World Championship
Medal record
Women's competition climbing
Representing United States
World Championships
Gold medal – first place	1995 Geneva	Lead
Silver medal – second place	1993 Innsbruck	Lead
Bronze medal – third place	1991 Frankfurt	Lead
World Cup
Bronze medal – third place	1989	Lead
Bronze medal – third place	1991	Lead
Winner	1992	Lead
Winner	1993	Lead
Winner	1994	Lead
Winner	1995	Lead
Rock Master
Winner	1994	Lead

Robyn Erbesfield-Raboutou (born 8 May 1963), is an American rock climber and rock climbing coach. In competition lead climbing, she is a 4-time World Cup champion (1992, 1993, 1994, 1995), and won the biennial World Championships in 1995. She is the third woman to redpoint a 5.14a (8b+) graded sport climbing route. She has coached several competition climbers, including Natalia Grossman, Megan Mascarenas, Margo Hayes, Colin Duffy, Emily Harrington and her daughter, Brooke Raboutou.

== Early life ==
Erbesfield-Raboutou was born in 1963 in Georgia (U.S. state). She was introduced to climbing by a high school boyfriend when she was 18, and climbed in Little River Canyon, Sand Rock, Looking Glass Rock, and Chattanooga.

== Climbing career ==
=== Competition climbing ===
Erbesfield won the world's first Climbing World Cup (Leeds in 1989) as a relative unknown. She quickly gained sponsorship and travelled around the world to compete on the new World Cup circuit. She went on to win the overall title for four consecutive World Cups from 1992 to 1995.

=== Rock climbing ===
In 1993, she became the third woman to redpoint a 5.14a (8b+) with ascents of Silence and Attention Vous Regard in France.

In the 90s she made the first ascents of Bad Attitude 5.14a (8b+) and No War More Love 5.14a (8b+) in Saint-Antonin-Noble-Val.

In 2012, she redpointed Welcome to Tijuana 5.14b (8c) in Rodellar, Spain, becoming the oldest American woman to climb at that grade at 49.

=== Coaching ===
Erbesfield-Raboutou founded the coaching company ABC Kids Climbing in an upstairs room at the Boulder Rock Club, Boulder, Colorado in 2003, and in 2012 they moved into their own space in East Boulder. Her coaching focused on developing agility, balance, and coordination in young climbers. Many of its graduates are climbing 5.14 outdoor routes, and performing well in national and international climbing competitions. Two of the four American athletes who qualified for the 2020 Olympics in sport climbing, Brooke Raboutou and Colin Duffy, were both members of Team ABC, which also produced Margo Hayes, the first woman to climb a 5.15a (9a+) route, and Natalia Grossman, the 2021 bouldering world champion.

In 2018 she was inducted into the Boulder Sports Hall of fame.

== Personal life ==
Erbesfield married French rock climber Didier Raboutou in 1993, and their two children, Brooke Raboutou and Shawn Raboutou, are themselves accomplished rock climbers.

== Rankings ==
=== Climbing World Championships ===
Discipline	1991	1993	1995
Lead	3	2	1

=== Climbing World Cup ===
Discipline	1989	1990	1991	1992	1993	1994	1995
Lead	3	4	3	1	1	1	1

== Number of medals in the Climbing World Cup ==
=== Lead ===
Season	Gold	Silver	Bronze	Total
1989	2		1	3
1990		1	1	2
1991	1	2	1	4
1992	2	3		5
1993	3	3		6
1994	4			4
1995	2	1	1	4
Total	14	10	4	28

== Notable Climbs ==
=== Redpointed ===
8c (5.14b):

- Welcome to Tijuana - Rodellar (ESP) - July 2012 - Her first 8c, at age 49 becoming the oldest American to climb the grade

8b+ (5.14a):

- Ixeia - Rodellar (ESP) - June 2012
- Tripa de Conejo - Rodellar (ESP) - June 2012
- God's Own Stone - Red River Gorge (USA) - April 1, 2012 - At age 48
- Bad Attitude - Saint-Antonin-Noble-Val (FRA) - August 27, 2008 - At age 45
- Attention vos Regards - Saint-Antonin-Noble-Val (FRA) - 1993
- Silence Vertical - Troubat (FRA) - 1993 - World's third female ascent of an 8b+ route.
- Thunder Muscle - The Flatirons (USA) - 2018

=== On-sighted ===
8a+ (5.13c):

- Overdose - Lourmarin (FRA) - 1993 - World's first female onsight of an 8a/+ route.

8a (5.13b):

- Ramponeau - Saint-Antonin-Noble-Val (FRA) - 1992

== Bibliography ==
- Noble, Chris (November 2013). Women Who Dare: North America's Most Inspiring Women Climbers. Falcon Guides. ISBN 978-0762783717.

== See also ==
- History of rock climbing
