= François Legrand (climber) =

French rock climber

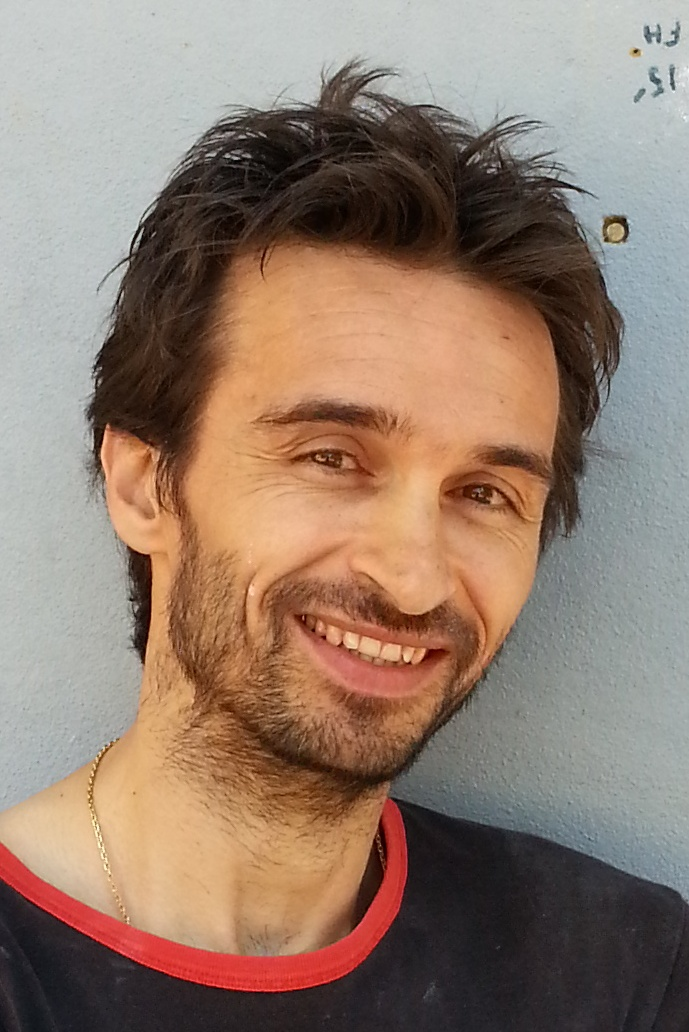
- Legrand in 2012

Personal information
- Born: March 26, 1970 (age 56) Grenoble, France
- Occupation: Professional rock climber
- Height: 178 cm (5 ft 10 in)
- Weight: 65 kg (143 lb)

Climbing career
- Type of climber: Sport climbing; Competition climbing
- Highest grade: Redpoint: 9a (5.14d); Onsight/Flash: 8b (5.13d)
- Retired from competition: 2003
- Known for: Winning 5 Lead Climbing World Cups and 3 Lead Climbing World Championships
Medal record
IFSC Climbing World Cup
| Winner | 1990 | Lead |
| Winner | 1991 | Lead |
| Winner | 1992 | Lead |
| Winner | 1993 | Lead |
| Second place | 1994 | Lead |
| Second place | 1995 | Lead |
| Winner | 1997 | Lead |
| Second place | 1999 | Lead |
IFSC Climbing World Championships
| Winner | 1991 | Lead |
| Winner | 1993 | Lead |
| Winner | 1995 | Lead |
Rock Master
| Winner | 1990 | Lead |
| Winner | 1994 | Lead |
| Winner | 1997 | Lead |
| Winner | 1998 | Lead |
- Updated on April 30, 2019

François Legrand (born March 26, 1970) is a French rock climber and former competition climber who specializes in sport climbing. He is known for winning five Lead Climbing World Cups (1990, 1991, 1992, 1993, 1997) and three consecutive Lead Climbing World Championships (1991, 1993, 1995). He retired from competition in 2003.

As of 2026, no other climber has won three consecutive lead world titles. His other lead records have since been equalled or passed. Muriel Sarkany and Janja Garnbret have also won five Lead World Cups. In 2025, Garnbret won her third lead world title and equalled both of Legrand's totals. Jakob Schubert and Angela Eiter have each won four lead world titles.

In the ranking of career World Cup season titles and World Championship golds, Legrand's eight wins place him third among men, behind Schubert and Adam Ondra. Among all climbers, Garnbret and Sandrine Levet also have more wins, and Eiter has the same number.

== Climbing career ==
Son of a mountain guide, he spent a lot of time in the mountains since he was a boy. His parents wanted him to become a mountain guide, rather than a rock climber. However, in 1988, aged 18, he ran away and moved for some months into a cave in Buoux. In the same year, he began competing at a national level. In 1990, he moved to Aix-en-Provence, where he rented an apartment with his friend Yuji Hirayama.

In 1990, aged 20, he won his first Lead Climbing World Cup. During his competition career, which ended in 2003, Legrand won five Lead Climbing World Cups (1990, 1991, 1992, 1993, 1997), three consecutive Lead Climbing World Championships (1991, 1993, 1995) and four Rock Masters (1990, 1994, 1997, 1998).

As of 2026, no other climber has won three consecutive lead world titles. No man has won more Lead World Cups than Legrand. Alexandre Chabot (2001–2003), Jakob Schubert and Adam Ondra have won three each. Among women, Muriel Sarkany and Janja Garnbret have also won five, and Robyn Erbesfield won four. In 2025, Garnbret won her third lead world title and equalled both of Legrand's totals.

From 2009, he coached the French national youth team together with Rémi Samyn.

== First ascents and new routes ==
In December 2000, Legrand made the first ascent of Robi in the Sky at Les Goudes in the Calanques, near Marseille. He had worked the line as a project and suggested a grade of 8c+/9a. He named the route after his late grandfather, Robi. In the same year, he made the first ascent of Ghetto Booty (8c+/9a) at Mount Charleston in the United States, after 17 days over two trips. Joe Brooks had bolted the line and left it for Legrand to try.

On Kalymnos, Greece, Legrand made the first redpoint ascents of two routes in the Grande Grotta during the 2004 Kalymnos Climbing Festival: the 50-metre extension of DNA (8a/8a+) and Fun de Chichunne (8a/8a+). Guy Abert had bolted Fun de Chichunne in 2001, but no one had climbed it. In 2009, he made the first ascent of Racomelo (8b) in the Iannis sector. In 2017 and 2018, he bolted several routes in the same sector, including La Mer et le Vent (6c+) and La Looz (8a), as well as two hard projects: Mine (8b+), an extension of La Looz, and Juanito (9a).

At Buoux, France, Legrand bolted several routes and extensions in the T.C.F. (Turbo Cibi Facho) sector in 2019, including La Grande Evasion (7b+) and Docteur Folamour (7b+). He also bolted Dévers Sévère at Buoux with his son Erwan. Erwan made the first ascent in 2022, at the age of 14, and graded it 8c+.

== Rankings ==
=== Climbing World Cup ===
| Discipline | 1990 | 1991 | 1992 | 1993 | 1994 | 1995 | 1996 | 1997 | 1998 | 1999 | 2000 | 2001 | 2002 | 2003 |
|---|---|---|---|---|---|---|---|---|---|---|---|---|---|---|
| Lead | 1 | 1 | 1 | 1 | 2 | 2 | 5 | 1 | 5 | 2 | 8 | 16 | - | 20 |

=== Climbing World Championships ===
| Discipline | 1991 | 1993 | 1995 | 1997 | 1999 | 2001 | 2003 |
|---|---|---|---|---|---|---|---|
| Lead | 1 | 1 | 1 | 3 | 11 | 20 | 45 |

== Number of medals in the Climbing World Cup ==
=== Lead ===
| Season | Gold | Silver | Bronze | Total |
|---|---|---|---|---|
| 1990 | 2 | 2 | 1 | 5 |
| 1991 | 3 | 1 | | 4 |
| 1992 | 3 | | | 3 |
| 1993 | 4 | 1 | | 5 |
| 1994 | 2 | 1 | | 3 |
| 1995 | 1 | 1 | 1 | 3 |
| 1996 | | | | |
| 1997 | 1 | 2 | | 3 |
| 1998 | | 1 | | 1 |
| 1999 | 1 | | | 1 |
| 2000 | | 1 | | 1 |
| 2001 | | 1 | | 1 |
| 2002 | | | | |
| 2003 | | | 1 | 1 |
| Total | 17 | 11 | 3 | 31 |

== Notable ascents ==
=== Redpointed routes ===
9a (5.14d):

- Robi in the Sky - Calanques (FRA) - 2000 - First ascent

8c+ (5.14c):

- Necessary Evil - Virgin River Gorge (USA) - Fifth ascent in 2002 - Route bolted by Chris Sharma in 1997
- Getto Booty - Mount Charleston (USA) - 2000 - First ascent
- Hasta La Vista - Mount Charleston (USA)
- Le Bronx - Orgon (FRA)
- La Connexion - Orgon (FRA)
- Reini's Vibe - Massone (ITA)
- Claudio Cafè - Terra Promessa (ITA)

8c (5.14b):

- Le Plafond - Volx (FRA) - His first 8c
- Maginot Line - Volx (FRA)
- Macumba Club - Orgon (FRA)
- Injustice - Orgon (FRA)
- U.F.O. - Calanques (FRA)
- Pterodactile - Tolone (FRA)
- Moutchiki - Luberon (FRA)
- Facile - Mount Charleston (USA)

== See also ==
- List of grade milestones in rock climbing
- History of rock climbing
- Rankings of most career IFSC gold medals
