= Isabelle Patissier =

French rock climber and rally driver (born 1967)

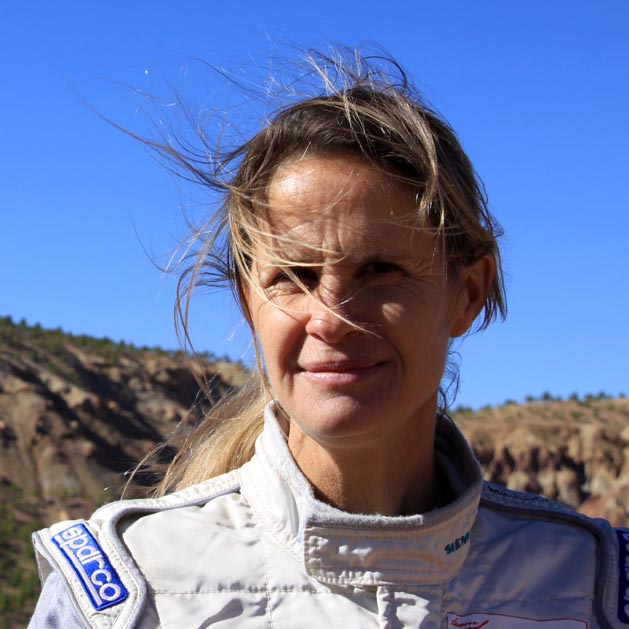
- Patissier rally driving in Morocco in 2011

Personal information
- Nationality: French
- Born: March 1, 1967 (age 59) Sainte-Foy-lès-Lyon
- Height: 1.71 m (5 ft 7 in)
- Weight: 49 kg (108 lb)

Climbing career
- Type of climber: Sport climbing
- Highest grade: Redpoint: 8b (5.13d)
- Known for: First woman to climb 8b (5.13d)
Medal record
Women's competition climbing
Representing France
World Cup
Winner	1990	Lead
Winner	1991	Lead
World Championships
Silver medal – second place	1991 Frankfurt	Lead
Bronze medal – third place	1993 Innsbruck	Lead
European Championships
Silver medal – second place	1992 Frankfurt	Lead
Sport Roccia
Bronze medal – third place	1986	Lead
Silver medal – second place	1988	Lead
Rock Master
Winner	1991	Lead
- Updated on 29 March 2013

Isabelle Patissier (born March 1, 1967) is a French world champion rock climber and more recently a rally driver. She is known for winning two Lead Climbing World Cups (1990, 1991) and for being the first-ever woman in history to climb an 8b (5.13d) route.

== Climbing career ==
Patissier started climbing at age 5 or 6 with her parents. At 14 she practised mountaineering in Chamonix and also slalom and downhill skiing. In 1986 at the age of 19, she won the first French official climbing competition, taking place in the sportshall in Vaulx-en-Velin only steps from her highschool, climbing barefoot. After this she devoted herself full-time to climbing and in 1988 became both the first woman to climb an 8b (Sortilèges at Cimaï) and French champion. She subsequently won this title a further 3 times.

== Personal life ==
Between 1993 and 1996 she was married to Nicolas Hulot a TV presenter and writer. In 1995 she retired from climbing. In 2000, she made her motorsport debut in the Rallye Aicha des Gazelles and in 2002 competed in her first Paris-Dakar rally. She later married her copilot/mechanic Thierry Delli-Zotti.

== Notable climbs ==
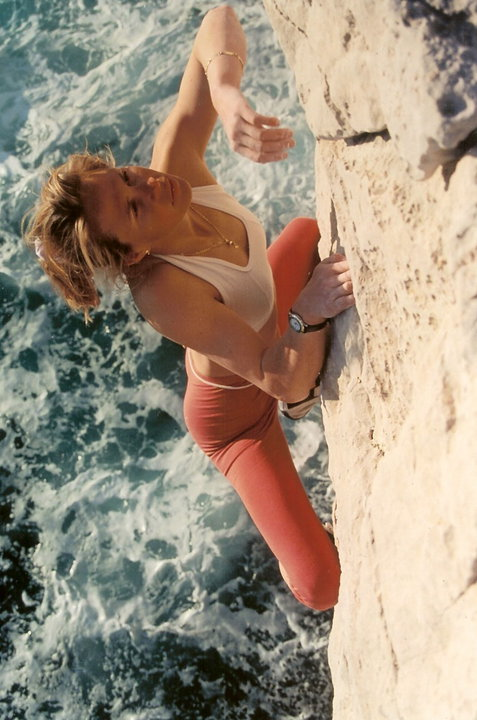
Patissier climbing in the Calanques area

8b (5.13d)

- Les sucettes à l'anis - Cimaï (FRA) - 1989
- Sortilèges - Cimaï (FRA) - 1988 - First-ever woman in history to redpoint an 8b (5.13d)

8a (5.13b)

- Échographie - Gorges du Verdon (FRA) - 1988

7c (5.12d)

- Katapult - Frankenjura (GER) - 1985

== Rankings ==
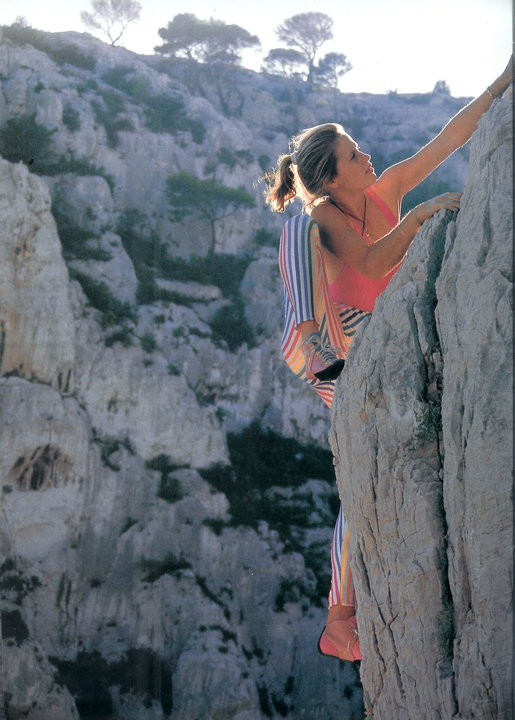

=== Lead Climbing World Cups ===
1989	1990	1991	1992	1993	1994
?	1	1	2	7	2

=== Lead Climbing World Championships ===
1991	1993
2	3

=== Lead Climbing European Championships ===
1992
2

=== Lead Climbing Rock Master ===
1987	1988	1989	1990	1991	1992
3	2	2	2	1	2

=== Number of medals in Lead climbing World Cups ===
Seasons	1st	2nd	3rd	Total
1989				
1990	2	2	1	5
1991	3	1		4
1992	1	3	2	6
1993	1		1	2
1994		2	1	3
Total	7	8	5	20

== Rally results ==
- 2000 - 3Com Star Challenge - 2nd
- 2000 - Trophy des Gazelles - 3rd
- 2004 - 1st woman world champion (Production category), with Team Nissan Dessoude
- 2004 - Oman Desert Express - Winner
- 2004 - Rally of Tunisia - 9th
- 2006 - Rally of Tunisia - 7th
- 2007 - Rally of Tunisia - 4th
- Dakar Rally - competed 2002, 2003, 2004, 2006, 2007, 2009, 2010, 2011 (3rd in 2WD, 16th in overall ranking) and 2012

== See also ==
- History of rock climbing
- List of first ascents (sport climbing)
