= Yuji Hirayama =

Japanese rock climber

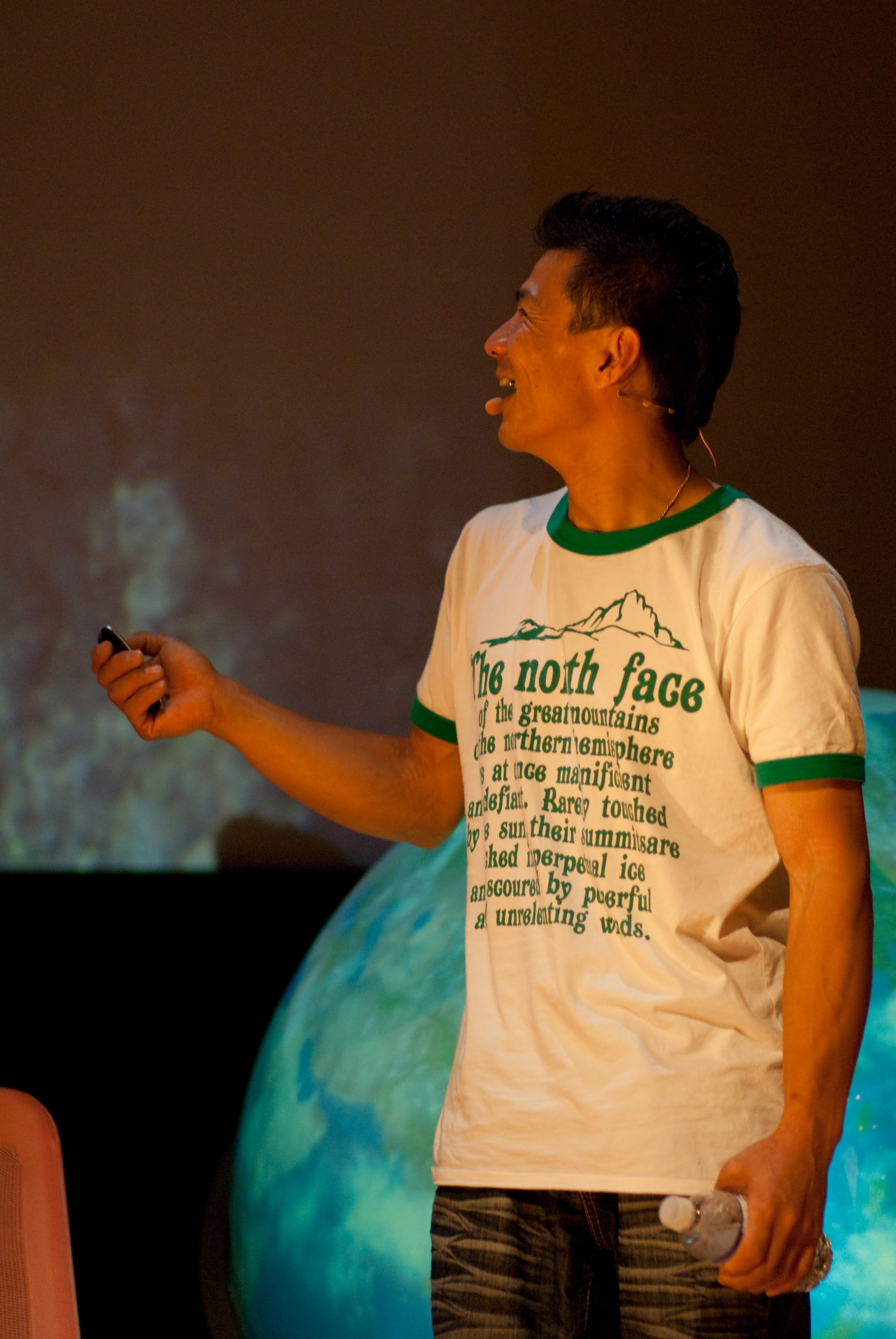
- Yuji Hirayama at TEDxTokyo 2009

Personal information
- Nationality: Japanese
- Born: February 23, 1969 (age 57) Tokyo
- Height: 173 cm (5 ft 8 in)
- Weight: 65 kg (143 lb)
- Website: ameblo.jp/stonerider/

Climbing career
- Type of climber: Sport climbing
- Highest grade: Redpoint: 9a+ (5.15a); Onsight/Flash: 8c (5.14b)
- Retired from competition: 2007
- Known for: First man to onsight 8c (5.14b)
Medal record
IFSC World Championships
Silver medal – second place	1991 Frankfurt	Lead
Silver medal – second place	1999 Birmingham	Lead
Bronze medal – third place	1993 Innsbruck	Lead
IFSC Climbing World Cup
Bronze medal – third place	1991	Lead
Bronze medal – third place	1993	Lead
Winner	1998	Lead
Winner	2000	Lead
Rock Master
Winner	1991	Lead
- Updated on 13 May 2013

Yuji Hirayama (平山ユージ; born February 23, 1969) is a Japanese rock climber specializing in lead climbing competitions. He won two Lead World Cups, in 1998 (becoming the first Asian climber to win the title) and in 2000. He is notable for being the first-ever climber to onsight an 8c (5.14b) route, and for his various speed records on El Capitan.

== Climbing career ==
On November 25, 1999, Hirayama onsighted Mortal Kombat (Castillon, FRA), which gained some historical relevance because it was initially believed to be the world's first onsight of an 8c (5.14b); however, a few days later, Hirayama himself downgraded it to 8b+, which has become the consensus grading.

On September 29, 2002, Hirayama and Hans Florine climbed The Nose in 2:48:55, setting a new speed record.

In 2003, he made the first ascent of a proposed 9a+ (5.15a) called Flat Mountain.

On October 6, 2004, he onsighted the 8c (5.14b) graded White Zombie in Baltzola Cave, ESP. This was the world's first-ever onsight of an 8c in history.). On 2005 Aug 10, Tomas Mrazek had the 2nd 8c onsight, Pata Negra at Rodellar in eastern Spain.

In 2007, his El Capitan Nose record was broken by the German brothers Alexander Huber and Thomas Huber. The Hubers climbed The Nose on October 8, 2007, in 2 hours, 45 minutes and 45 seconds. On July 2, 2008, Hirayama and Florine retook the record in a time of 2:43:33. Then on October 12, 2008, they lowered the record to 2:37:05.

In 2008, he made the third ascent of boulder problem, Uma V14 (8B+) at Shiobara, and the first ascent of Ginga V14 (8B+) at Kanoto. In 2009, he made the 6th ascent of Cobra Crack in Squamish, British Columbia.

In 2012, he freed a multi-pitch route called Pogulian Do Koduduo in the Mount Kinabalu National Park in Borneo with one pitch at 9a.

== Business career ==
In 2010, Hirayama opened "Climb Park Base Camp", a climbing gym in Saitama prefecture, Japan.

== See also ==
- History of rock climbing
- List of grade milestones in rock climbing
