= International Climbing and Mountaineering Federation =

International sport governing body

- Sport: Mountaineering; Alpine climbing; Rock climbing; Competition ice climbing; Climbing
- Jurisdiction: International
- Abbreviation: UIAA
- Founded: August 1932; 94 years ago
- Headquarters: Bern, Switzerland
- President: Peter Muir

Official website
- www.theuiaa.org

The International Climbing and Mountaineering Federation, commonly known by its French name Union internationale des associations d'alpinisme (UIAA; French for 'International Union of Alpine Clubs'), was founded in August 1932 in Chamonix, France when 20 mountaineering associations met for an alpine congress. Count Charles Egmond d'Arcis, from Switzerland, was chosen as the first president and it was decided by the founding members that the UIAA would be an international federation which would be in charge of the "study and solution of all problems regarding mountaineering". The UIAA Safety Label was created in 1960 and was internationally approved in 1965 and currently (2015) has a global presence on five continents with 86 member associations in 62 countries representing over 3 million people.

== Russia ==
After the 2022 Russian invasion of Ukraine and in accordance with the IOC recommendations, the UIAA suspended all UIAA officials from Russia, and delegates from the Russian Mountaineering Federation (RMF) and Russian officials and athletes were excluded from all UIAA-sanctioned activities and events.
