= Sport climbing at the 2005 Asian Indoor Games =

- Venue: Suphanburi Sports Complex
- Dates: 14–16 November 2005

Sport climbing at the 2005 Asian Indoor Games was held in Suphanburi Sports Complex, Suphanburi, Thailand from 14 November to 16 November 2005.

== Medalists ==
=== Men ===
Event	Gold	Silver	Bronze
Lead	Son Sang-won; South Korea	Liu Changzhong; China	Mohammad Jafari; Iran
Speed	Chen Xiaojie; China	Zaki Ramli; Singapore	Galar Pandu Asmoro; Indonesia

=== Women ===
Event	Gold	Silver	Bronze
Lead	Kim Ja-in; South Korea	Liu Hiu Ying; Hong Kong	Huang Liping; China
Speed	Evi Neliwati; Indonesia	Khaetthaleeya Uppakham; Thailand	Tri Adianti; Indonesia

== Medal table ==
Rank	Nation	Gold	Silver	Bronze	Total
1	South Korea (KOR)	2	0	0	2
2	China (CHN)	1	1	1	3
3	Indonesia (INA)	1	0	2	3
4	Hong Kong (HKG)	0	1	0	1
4	Singapore (SIN)	0	1	0	1
4	Thailand (THA)	0	1	0	1
7	Iran (IRI)	0	0	1	1
Totals (7 entries)		4	4	4	12

== Results ==
=== Men ===
==== Lead ====
14–16 November

Rank	Athlete	QF	SF	Final
1st place, gold medalist(s)	Son Sang-won (KOR)	Top	Top	48−
2nd place, silver medalist(s)	Liu Changzhong (CHN)	Top	Top	38−
3rd place, bronze medalist(s)	Mohammad Jafari (IRI)	Top	48	26−
4	Ponti Hardiyanto (INA)	Top	48−	24
5	Nurmansyah Putra (INA)	45	Top	24−
6	Amir Pirveisi (IRI)	46−	49	24−
7	Cao Rongwu (CHN)	Top	48−	23−
8	Jaime Pahati (PHI)	Top	48−	22
9	Kim Ja-ha (KOR)	Top	46−	
10	Kim Hee-jo (KOR)	Top	44	
11	Yoshinobu Shinozaki (JPN)	Top	42−	
12	Lai Chi Wai (HKG)	Top	36	
13	Ronald Mamarimbing (INA)	Top	36−	
14	Alexandr Nigmatulin (KAZ)	45−	36−	
15	Kim Ja-bee (KOR)	Top	35−	
16	Hamid Reza Touzandeh (IRI)	Top	34+	
17	Tan Sze Ping (SIN)	45	34+	
18	Hafzanizam Bakhori (MAS)	39	33−	
19	Yam Choon Hian (SIN)	Top	31−	
20	Artyom Devyaterikov (KAZ)	Top	30−	
21	Leong Chee Hoi (SIN)	34−	30−	
22	Denis Zhendinskiy (KAZ)	Top	29+	
23	Phairat Kaewkan (THA)	42−	28−	
24	Francis Low (MAS)	43−	25+	
25	Huang Kuo-wei (TPE)	35	25	
26	Sobhan Jafari (IRI)	44−	23+	
27	Nikita Devyaterikov (KAZ)	33−		
28	Jose Mari Cortes (PHI)	31		
29	Li Guangpu (CHN)	29−		
29	Tarmizi Jaffar (MAS)	29−		
31	Anatoliy Leontyev (KAZ)	28−		
32	Fong Lei Ou (MAC)	25−		
32	Dhansarit Meeseat (THA)	25−		
34	Lie Man Wai (MAC)	21−		
35	Tong Si Kei (MAC)	21−		
36	Tang Wai Ip (MAC)	20−		

==== Speed ====
===== Qualification =====
15 November

Rank	Athlete	Time
1	Galar Pandu Asmoro (INA)	19.81
2	Chirasak Nasuan (THA)	21.70
3	Zaki Ramli (SIN)	22.38
4	Abudzar Yulianto (INA)	22.68
5	Chen Xiaojie (CHN)	23.19
6	Erianto Rozak (INA)	23.33
7	Syafiq Utama (SIN)	26.24
8	Hatta Hasim (SIN)	28.26
9	Hafzanizam Bakhori (MAS)	28.26
10	Lai Chi Wai (HKG)	29.21
11	Tarmizi Jaffar (MAS)	30.64
12	Faddli Kamsani (SIN)	31.54
13	Hamid Reza Touzandeh (IRI)	31.69
14	Francis Low (MAS)	31.91
15	Ridzuan Yusoff (SIN)	33.08
16	Alexandr Nigmatulin (KAZ)	33.29
17	Anatoliy Leontyev (KAZ)	33.54
18	Artyom Devyaterikov (KAZ)	34.27
19	Reza Pilpa (IRI)	35.37
20	Li Guangpu (CHN)	35.45
21	Amir Hossein Samavat (IRI)	36.09
22	Nikita Devyaterikov (KAZ)	41.01
23	Denis Zhendinskiy (KAZ)	49.51
24	Yoshinobu Shinozaki (JPN)	51.81
25	Nakarin Chatsuwan (THA)	Fall

===== Knockout round =====
16 November

1/8 finals
Galar Pandu Asmoro (INA)	18.62
Bye
Lai Chi Wai (HKG)	24.38
Tarmizi Jaffar (MAS)
Abudzar Yulianto (INA)	20.75
Reza Pilpa (IRI)
Chen Xiaojie (CHN)	24.12
Anatoliy Leontyev (KAZ)
Chirasak Nasuan (THA)	21.48
Yoshinobu Shinozaki (JPN)
Hafzanizam Bakhori (MAS)	23.74
Hamid Reza Touzandeh (IRI)
Zaki Ramli (SIN)	23.01
Li Guangpu (CHN)	Fall
Syafiq Utama (SIN)
Alexandr Nigmatulin (KAZ)	29.63

1/4 finals
Galar Pandu Asmoro (INA)	16.74
Lai Chi Wai (HKG)	25.07
Abudzar Yulianto (INA)	Fall
Chen Xiaojie (CHN)	17.25
Chirasak Nasuan (THA)	18.60
Hafzanizam Bakhori (MAS)	22.16
Zaki Ramli (SIN)	22.82
Alexandr Nigmatulin (KAZ)	26.98

1/2 finals
Galar Pandu Asmoro (INA)	19.73
Chen Xiaojie (CHN)	18.96
Chirasak Nasuan (THA)	Fall
Zaki Ramli (SIN)	19.56

Final
Chen Xiaojie (CHN)	18.15
Zaki Ramli (SIN)	19.14
Third place
Galar Pandu Asmoro (INA)	15.98
Chirasak Nasuan (THA)	18.66

=== Women ===
==== Lead ====
14–16 November

Rank	Athlete	QF	SF	Final
1st place, gold medalist(s)	Kim Ja-in (KOR)	Top	Top	43
2nd place, silver medalist(s)	Liu Hiu Ying (HKG)	Top	Top	43−
3rd place, bronze medalist(s)	Huang Liping (CHN)	Top	Top	30−
4	Li Chunhua (CHN)	Top	Top	29
5	Ilmawaty Labanu (INA)	42	Top	29
6	Wilda Baco Achmad (INA)	Top	Top	29−
6	Tomoko Madate (JPN)	Top	Top	29−
8	Suzanna Tan (SIN)	Top	Top	25
9	Zhang Dan (CHN)	42	Top	
10	Elaina Flores (PHI)	40−	43	
11	Tri Adianti (INA)	30+	43	
12	Dinara Irsaliyeva (KAZ)	Top	34−	
13	Nur Zaharatullaili Mustafa (MAS)	41	31	
14	Lisa Cheng (HKG)	40	31	
15	Payom Numchan (THA)	40−	30	
16	Lissa Lesaca (PHI)	35	28	
17	Yuyun Yuniar (INA)	43	25	
18	Barbara Ramiro (PHI)	38−	25	
19	Tamara Smirnova (KAZ)	43−	24−	
20	He Cuifang (CHN)	41−	23−	
21	Elnaz Rekabi (IRI)	34	23−	
22	Alina Kumasheva (KAZ)	39−	22	
23	Evi Neliwati (INA)	37−	22	
24	Bahareh Moradi (IRI)	29−	22	
25	Goh Tan Leng (SIN)	30	22	
26	Vassana Thongsuk (THA)	29+	19	
27	Yevgeniya Soboleva (KAZ)	28		
28	Cheang Un I (MAC)	25		

==== Speed ====
===== Qualification =====
15 November

Rank	Athlete	Time
1	Evi Neliwati (INA)	30.88
2	Khaetthaleeya Uppakham (THA)	31.13
3	Nonglux Pet-aoumnoy (THA)	35.26
4	He Cuifang (CHN)	37.86
5	Tri Adianti (INA)	39.77
6	Yuyun Yuniar (INA)	40.83
7	Dinara Irsaliyeva (KAZ)	42.36
8	Zhang Dan (CHN)	43.17
9	Tamara Smirnova (KAZ)	43.23
10	Lisa Cheng (HKG)	43.57
11	Beatrix Chong (SIN)	45.57
12	Chung Sue Ann (SIN)	46.13
13	Choi Shun Yuk (HKG)	46.22
14	Low Shuang E (SIN)	47.19
15	Alina Kumasheva (KAZ)	52.14
16	Yevgeniya Soboleva (KAZ)	52.45
17	Kim Ja-in (KOR)	54.46
18	Nur Zaharatullaili Mustafa (MAS)	57.84
19	Tomoko Madate (JPN)	64.79
20	Elnaz Rekabi (IRI)	Fall

===== Knockout round =====
16 November

1/8 finals
Evi Neliwati (INA)	27.46
Bye
Tamara Smirnova (KAZ)
Lisa Cheng (HKG)	36.67
He Cuifang (CHN)	40.91
Kim Ja-in (KOR)
Tri Adianti (INA)	38.68
Choi Shun Yuk (HKG)
Khaetthaleeya Uppakham (THA)	35.43
Tomoko Madate (JPN)
Zhang Dan (CHN)	45.25
Beatrix Chong (SIN)	41.14
Nonglux Pet-aoumnoy (THA)	33.37
Nur Zaharatullaili Mustafa (MAS)
Dinara Irsaliyeva (KAZ)	40.09
Chung Sue Ann (SIN)

1/4 finals
Evi Neliwati (INA)	27.19
Lisa Cheng (HKG)	36.93
He Cuifang (CHN)	33.24
Tri Adianti (INA)	29.21
Khaetthaleeya Uppakham (THA)	31.05
Beatrix Chong (SIN)	40.74
Nonglux Pet-aoumnoy (THA)	34.73
Dinara Irsaliyeva (KAZ)	34.04

1/2 finals
Evi Neliwati (INA)	32.34
Tri Adianti (INA)	Fall
Khaetthaleeya Uppakham (THA)	31.41
Dinara Irsaliyeva (KAZ)	34.23

Final
Evi Neliwati (INA)	28.75
Khaetthaleeya Uppakham (THA)	32.67
Third place
Tri Adianti (INA)	30.04
Dinara Irsaliyeva (KAZ)	37.63
