= Iran at the 2005 Asian Indoor Games =

- IOC code: IRI
- NOC: National Olympic Committee of the Islamic Republic of Iran

in Bangkok
- Competitors: 48 in 4 sports
- Flag bearer: Vahid Shamsaei
- Medals Ranked 11th: Gold 3 Silver 5 Bronze 2 Total 10

Asian Indoor Games appearances
- 2005; 2007; 2009; 2013; 2017; 2021; 2026

Iran participated in the 2005 Asian Indoor Games held in Bangkok, Thailand from November 12, 2005 to November 19, 2005.

== Competitors ==
Sport	Men	Women	Total
Aggressive inline skating	3		3
Futsal	14		14
Indoor athletics	15	2	17
Muaythai	5		5
Skateboarding	1		1
Sport climbing	6	2	8
Total	44	4	48

== Medal summary ==
=== Medals by sport ===
Sport	Gold	Silver	Bronze	Total
Futsal	1			1
Indoor athletics	1	3	1	5
Muaythai	1	2		3
Sport climbing			1	1
Total	3	5	2	10

=== Medalists ===
Medal	Name	Sport	Event
Gold	Reza Nasseri; Morteza Azimaei; Majid Latifi; Mohsen Zareei; Mohammad Hashemzadeh; Hossein Soltani; Majid Raeisi; Kazem Mohammadi; Vahid Shamsaei; Mohammad Taheri; Majid Tikdarinejad; Mostafa Nazari; Mohammad Golzadeh; Arash Sheini	Futsal	Men
Gold	Mohammad Akefian	Indoor athletics	Men's 400 m
Gold	Abdolvahab Maroufi	Muaythai	Men's 86 kg
Silver	Hashem Khazaei; Abolfazl Dehnavi; Amir Piaho; Mohammad Akefian	Indoor athletics	Men's 4 × 400 m relay
Silver	Mehdi Shahrokhi	Indoor athletics	Men's shot put
Silver	Hadi Sepehrzad	Indoor athletics	Men's heptathlon
Silver	Masoud Izadi	Muaythai	Men's 57 kg
Silver	Vahid Roshani	Muaythai	Men's 75 kg
Bronze	Mohsen Rabbani	Indoor athletics	Men's pole vault
Bronze	Mohammad Jafari	Sport climbing	Men's lead

== Results by event ==
=== Extreme sports ===
==== Aggressive inline ====
Athlete	Event	Preliminary		Final	
Athlete	Event	Score	Rank	Score	Rank
Shayan Nejati	Open park	45.67	13	Did not advance	
Milad Ajdari	Open park best trick	—N/a		46.44	12
Arash Salmanpour	Open park best trick	—N/a		51.67	11
Milad Ajdari	Open vert	51.00	9 Q	61.00	7
Arash Salmanpour	Open vert	55.33	6 Q	59.33	8

==== Skateboarding ====
Athlete	Event	Preliminary		Final	
Athlete	Event	Score	Rank	Score	Rank
Mohammad Javad Rahimi	Open park	50.00	14	Did not advance	
Mohammad Javad Rahimi	Open park best trick	—N/a		51.89	14

==== Sport climbing ====
Athlete	Event	Qualification		Round of 16	Quarterfinal	Semifinal		Final	Rank
Athlete	Event	Result / Time	Rank	Round of 16	Quarterfinal	Result	Rank	Result	Rank
Mohammad Jafari	Men's lead	Top	1 Q	—N/a		48	5 Q	26−	3rd place, bronze medalist(s)
Sobhan Jafari	Men's lead	44−	21 Q	—N/a		23+	26	Did not advance	26
Amir Pirveisi	Men's lead	46−	17 Q	—N/a		49	4 Q	24−	6
Hamid Reza Touzandeh	Men's lead	Top	1 Q	—N/a		34+	16	Did not advance	16
Reza Pilpa	Men's speed	35.37	19 Q	Yulianto (INA); L	Did not advance				?
Amir Hossein Samavat	Men's speed	36.09	21	Did not advance					22
Hamid Reza Touzandeh	Men's speed	31.69	13 Q	Bakhori (MAS); L	Did not advance				?
Bahareh Moradi	Women's lead	29−	26 Q	—N/a		22	24	Did not advance	24
Elnaz Rekabi	Women's lead	34	22 Q	—N/a		23−	21	Did not advance	21
Elnaz Rekabi	Women's speed	Fall	20	Did not advance					20

=== Futsal ===
Team	Event	Preliminary round			Quarterfinal	Semifinal	Final	Rank
Team	Event	Round 1	Round 2	Rank	Quarterfinal	Semifinal	Final	Rank
Iran	Men	China; W 5–0	Macau; W 18–1	1 Q	Qatar; W 11–0	China; W 4–2	Thailand; W 3–0	1st place, gold medalist(s)
Roster: Reza Nasseri; Morteza Azimaei; Majid Latifi; Mohsen Zareei; Mohammad Hashemzadeh; Hossein Soltani; Majid Raeisi; Kazem Mohammadi; Vahid Shamsaei; Mohammad Taheri; Majid Tikdarinejad; Mostafa Nazari; Mohammad Golzadeh; Arash Sheini; Coach: (Brazil) Jurandir Dutra

=== Indoor athletics ===
Track & Field

Athlete	Event	Round 1		Final	Rank
Athlete	Event	Time	Rank	Time / Result	Rank
Hossein Ghaemi	Men's 60 m	6.87	3 q	6.91	5
Amir Piaho	Men's 60 m	6.98	4	Did not advance	12
Mohammad Akefian	Men's 400 m	49.42	3 q	47.83 GR	1st place, gold medalist(s)
Abolfazl Dehnavi	Men's 800 m	1:58.35	2 Q	1:53.82	4
Rouhollah Mohammadi	Men's 1500 m	—N/a		3:57.91	4
Karam Sohrabi	Men's 3000 m	—N/a		8:41.80	4
Hashem Khazaei; Abolfazl Dehnavi; Amir Piaho; Mohammad Akefian	Men's 4 × 400 m relay	—N/a		3:18.81	2nd place, silver medalist(s)
Amin Hosseinzadeh Rahbar	Men's high jump	—N/a		2.08 m	4
Mohsen Rabbani	Men's pole vault	—N/a		5.00 m	3rd place, bronze medalist(s)
Hamid Reza Abolhassani	Men's long jump	—N/a		7.18 m	7
Mohammad Arzandeh	Men's long jump	—N/a		7.32 m	5
Hamid Reza Abolhassani	Men's triple jump	—N/a		15.26 m	5
Amir Alvand	Men's shot put	—N/a		17.04 m	7
Mehdi Shahrokhi	Men's shot put	—N/a		18.33 m	2nd place, silver medalist(s)
Leila Ebrahimi	Women's 1500 m	—N/a		4:34.18	4
Mina Pourseifi	Women's 1500 m	—N/a		4:49.82	6
Leila Ebrahimi	Women's 3000 m	—N/a		10:08.90	5
Mina Pourseifi	Women's 3000 m	—N/a		10:40.01	8

Combined

Athlete	Event	60m	LJ	SP	HJ	60mH	PV	1000m	Total	Rank
Ali Feizi	Men's heptathlon	7.35; 762	6.54 m 707	14.12 m 736	1.92 m 731	8.86; 777	NM; 0	DNS	DNF	—
Hadi Sepehrzad	Men's heptathlon	7.03; 872	6.79 m 764	16.03 m 853	1.86 m 679	8.32; 903	3.90 m 590	3:00.11; 663	5324	2nd place, silver medalist(s)

=== Muaythai ===
Athlete	Event	Round of 16	Quarterfinal	Semifinal	Final	Rank
Masoud Izadi	Men's 57 kg	Khantemirov (KAZ); W	Lam (MAC); W RSC	Boonthavy (LAO); W 59–58	Uamsamang (THA); L 57–60	2nd place, silver medalist(s)
Ahmad Rajabi	Men's 61 kg	—N/a	Yesbolsynov (KAZ); L 58–59	Did not advance		5
Mostafa Abdollahi	Men's 71 kg	—N/a	Kassenov (KAZ); L 58–59	Did not advance		5
Vahid Roshani	Men's 75 kg	—N/a	Matsuzaki (JPN); W	Alumno (PHI); W RSCO	Kassenov (KAZ); L 58–59	2nd place, silver medalist(s)
Abdolvahab Maroufi	Men's 86 kg	—N/a		Kadhim (IRQ); W 60–57	Al-Tamari (JOR); W 60–57	1st place, gold medalist(s)
