= Aerobic gymnastics at the 2005 Asian Indoor Games =

Aerobic Gymnastics Team

- Venue: Saphan Hin Sports Complex
- Dates: 16–17 November 2005

Aerobic gymnastics at the 2005 Asian Indoor Games was held in Saphan Hin Sports Complex, Phuket, Thailand from 16 November to 17 November 2005.

== Medalists ==
Event	Gold	Silver	Bronze
Men's individual	Ao Jinping; China	Nattawut Pimpa; Thailand	Yasutake Deguchi; Japan
Women's individual	Li Mei; China	Asami Takeuchi; Japan	Roypim Ngampeerapong; Thailand
Mixed pair	China; Ni Zhenhua; Fan Jie	South Korea; Song Jong-kun; Shin Hyun-kyung	Japan; Takao Higuchi; Yoshiko Higuchi
Trio	China; Qin Yong; He Shijian; Yu Wei	South Korea; Song Jong-kun; Kim Gyun-taek; Shin Hyun-kyung	Thailand; Kittipong Tawinun; Phairach Thotkhamchai; Chanchalak Yiammit

== Medal table ==
Rank	Nation	Gold	Silver	Bronze	Total
1	China (CHN)	4	0	0	4
2	South Korea (KOR)	0	2	0	2
3	Japan (JPN)	0	1	2	3
3	Thailand (THA)	0	1	2	3
Totals (4 entries)		4	4	4	12

== Results ==
=== Men's individual ===
17 November

Rank	Athlete	SF	Final
1st place, gold medalist(s)	Ao Jinping (CHN)	20.10	20.40
2nd place, silver medalist(s)	Nattawut Pimpa (THA)	18.45	19.65
3rd place, bronze medalist(s)	Yasutake Deguchi (JPN)	20.00	19.55
4	Kim Gyun-taek (KOR)	19.55	19.45
5	Erwin Ongso (INA)	18.35	18.55
6	Brian Peralta (PHI)	17.85	17.55
7	Khưu Tấn Phát (VIE)	17.15	16.98
8	Tung Chun-kuei (TPE)	15.95	16.50
9	Nguyễn Thành Huy (VIE)	17.60	
10	Lu Mei-yi (TPE)	14.15	
11	Shyamsundar Joshi Ameya (IND)	14.05	
12	Enkhsaikhany Mönkh-Orgil (MGL)	12.70	
13	Galbadrakhyn Yeruulbat (MGL)	10.65	

=== Women's individual ===
16 November

Rank	Athlete	SF	Final
1st place, gold medalist(s)	Li Mei (CHN)	20.05	20.10
2nd place, silver medalist(s)	Asami Takeuchi (JPN)	19.90	19.50
3rd place, bronze medalist(s)	Roypim Ngampeerapong (THA)	19.43	19.28
4	Mai Thị Bích Lâm (VIE)	17.15	18.10
5	Jung Eun-ji (KOR)	17.55	18.00
6	Citra Resita (INA)	17.55	17.75
7	Lakku Anita Reddy (IND)	12.75	14.10
8	Baatarsaikhany Khulan (MGL)	8.78	11.65
9	Yoshimi Miyata (JPN)	19.85	
10	Huang Jinxuan (CHN)	18.00	
11	Nguyễn Thị Thanh Hiền (VIE)	17.15	

=== Mixed pair ===
16 November

Rank	Team	SF	Final
1st place, gold medalist(s)	China (CHN); Ni Zhenhua; Fan Jie	19.40	19.35
2nd place, silver medalist(s)	South Korea (KOR); Song Jong-kun; Shin Hyun-kyung	19.45	19.35
3rd place, bronze medalist(s)	Japan (JPN); Takao Higuchi; Yoshiko Higuchi	18.55	19.15
4	Vietnam (VIE); Nguyễn Tấn Thành; Nguyễn Thị Thanh Hiền	17.10	18.25
5	Thailand (THA); Nattawut Pimpa; Suwadee Phrutichai	18.30	18.25
6	Indonesia (INA); Amin Ikhsan; Meutia Sulfany	16.70	17.35

=== Trio ===
17 November

Rank	Team	SF	Final
1st place, gold medalist(s)	China (CHN); Qin Yong; He Shijian; Yu Wei	19.75	19.95
2nd place, silver medalist(s)	South Korea (KOR); Song Jong-kun; Kim Gyun-taek; Shin Hyun-kyung	18.95	19.40
3rd place, bronze medalist(s)	Thailand (THA); Kittipong Tawinun; Phairach Thotkhamchai; Chanchalak Yiammit	18.15	18.65
4	Japan (JPN); Yoshimi Miyata; Asami Takeuchi; Kiyomi Yoshiyama	18.85	18.50
5	Vietnam (VIE); Nguyễn Thành Huy; Nguyễn Tấn Thành; Thái Anh Tuấn	17.65	17.15
6	Philippines (PHI); Dan Mar Luna; Alejandro Mendelebar; Brian Peralta	15.25	16.90
7	Mongolia (MGL); Galbadrakhyn Yeruulbat; Enkhsaikhany Mönkh-Orgil; Baatarsaikhany Khulan	8.35	13.50
8	Macau (MAC); Kok Chou Mui; Fong Hoi Kei; Lei Ieng Cheng	9.55	9.90
