= Sepak takraw at the 2005 Asian Indoor Games =

- Venue: The Mall Bangkapi
- Dates: 15–18 November 2005

Hoop sepak takraw was contested at the 2005 Asian Indoor Games in The Mall Bangkapi, Bangkok, Thailand from 15 November 15 to 18 November 2025.

== Medalists ==
Event	Gold	Silver	Bronze
Men	Thailand	Singapore	China
Men	Thailand	Singapore	South Korea
Women	Thailand	Vietnam; Nguyễn Thị Hoa; Nguyễn Bạch Vân; Đỗ Thị Thu Hiền; Nguyễn Thị Thu Ba; Cao Thị Yến	Laos
Women	Thailand	Vietnam; Nguyễn Thị Hoa; Nguyễn Bạch Vân; Đỗ Thị Thu Hiền; Nguyễn Thị Thu Ba; Cao Thị Yến	China

== Medal table ==
Rank	Nation	Gold	Silver	Bronze	Total
1	Thailand (THA)	2	0	0	2
2	Singapore (SIN)	0	1	0	1
2	Vietnam (VIE)	0	1	0	1
4	China (CHN)	0	0	2	2
5	Laos (LAO)	0	0	1	1
5	South Korea (KOR)	0	0	1	1
Totals (6 entries)		2	2	4	8

== Results ==
=== Men ===
==== Preliminary round ====
15–16 November

Rank	Team	1st	2nd
1	Thailand	590	540
2	Singapore	350	460
3	South Korea	390	380
4	China	290	330
5	Laos	280	300
6	Cambodia	210	210
7	Japan	130	170

==== Knockout round ====
Semifinals; 17 November		Final; 18 November
Thailand	610
South Korea	390	Thailand	640
Singapore	450	Singapore	360
China	290

=== Women ===
==== Preliminary round ====
15–16 November

Rank	Team	1st	2nd
1	Vietnam	400	480
2	Thailand	490	470
3	China	160	290
4	Laos	250	290

==== Knockout round ====
Semifinals; 17 November		Final; 18 November
Vietnam	330
Laos	270	Vietnam	400
Thailand	510	Thailand	580
China	210
