= South Korea at the 2005 Asian Indoor Games =

- IOC code: KOR
- NOC: Korean Olympic Committee

in Bangkok
- Medals Ranked 9th: Gold 5 Silver 7 Bronze 10 Total 22

Asian Indoor Games appearances
- 2005; 2007; 2009; 2013; 2017; 2021; 2025

South Korea competed at the 2005 Asian Indoor Games held in Bangkok, Thailand from November 12, 2005 to November 19, 2005. South Korea finished with 5 gold medals, 7 silver medals, and 10 bronze medals.

== Medal summary ==
=== Medal table ===
Sport	Gold	Silver	Bronze	Total
Short course swimming	3	2	7	12
Sport climbing	2	0	0	2
Dancesport	0	2	2	4
Aerobic gymnastics	0	2	0	2
Indoor athletics	0	1	0	1
Sepak takraw	0	0	1	1
Totals (6 entries)	5	7	10	22

=== Medalists ===
Medal	Name	Sport	Event
Gold	Son Sang-Won	Sport climbing	Men's lead
Gold	Kim Ja-in	Sport climbing	Women's lead
Gold	Han Myung-Seok	Short course swimming	Men's 200 m backstroke
Gold	Won Jae-Yun	Short course swimming	Men's 200 m butterfly
Gold	Seo Hee	Short course swimming	Women's 200 m backstroke
Silver	Song Jong-Kun; Shin Hyun-Kyung	Aerobic gymnastics	Mixed pair
Silver	Song Jong-Kun; Shin Hyun-Kyung; Kim Gyun-Taek	Aerobic gymnastics	Trio
Silver	Yun Hak-Jun; Park Eun-Jung	Dancesport	Standard dance (Quickstep)
Silver	Park Ji-Woo; Park Ji-Eun	Dancesport	Latin dance (Rumba)
Silver	Kim Seong-Eun	Indoor athletics	Women's 3000 m
Silver	Kim Myung-Hwan	Short course swimming	Men's 50 m backstroke
Silver	Lee Mi-Rim	Short course swimming	Women's 100 m individual medley
Bronze	Park Ji-Woo; Park Ji-Eun	Dancesport	Latin dance (Five dances)
Bronze	Jung Hee-Jung; Kim Hyun-Jin	Dancesport	Latin dance (Cha-cha-cha)
Bronze	Men's Team	Hoop takraw	Men's Hoop takraw
Bronze	Park Min-Kyu	Short course swimming	Men's 200 m freestyle
Bronze	Han Myung-Seok	Short course swimming	Men's 50 m backstroke
Bronze	Han Myung-Seok	Short course swimming	Men's 100 m backstroke
Bronze	Men's Team	Short course swimming	Men's 4×100 m freestyle relay
Bronze	Jeong Woo-Hee	Short course swimming	Women's 200 m breaststroke
Bronze	Lee Hyun-Lee	Short course swimming	Women's 200 m individual medley
Bronze	Women's Team	Short course swimming	Men's 4×50 m freestyle relay
