= 2007 IFSC Climbing World Championships =

Competition climbing event

- Location: Aviles, Spain
- Date: 17–23 September 2007
- Competitors: 302 from 50 nations

The 2007 IFSC Climbing World Championships, the 9th edition, were held in Aviles, Spain from 17 to 23 September 2007. It was the first Climbing World Championships organized by the International Federation of Sport Climbing (IFSC) in the sport of competition climbing.

== Medal winners overview ==
| Event | Gold | Silver | Bronze |
|---|---|---|---|
| Men's Lead | (Spain) Ramón Julián Puigblanqué | (Spain) Patxi Usobiaga Lakunza | (Switzerland) Cédric Lachat (Czech Republic) Tomáš Mrázek (Netherlands) Jorg Verhoeven |
| Men's Bouldering | (Russia) Dmitrii Sharafutdinov | (Czech Republic) Martin Stráník | (Switzerland) Cédric Lachat |
| Men's Speed | (China) QiXin Zhong | (Venezuela) Manuel Escobar | (Russia) Sergei Sinitcyn |
| Women's Lead | (Austria) Angela Eiter | (Belgium) Muriel Sarkany | (Slovenia) Maja Vidmar |
| Women's Bouldering | (Austria) Anna Stöhr | (Japan) Akiyo Noguchi | (Russia) Olga Bibik |
| Women's Speed | (Russia) Tatiana Ruyga | (Poland) Edyta Ropek | (Russia) Valentina Yurina |

== Lead ==
=== Men ===
115 athletes attended the men's lead competition.

| Rank | Name | Score |
|---|---|---|
| 1 | (Spain) Ramón Julián Puigblanqué | 8300 |
| 2 | (Spain) Patxi Usobiaga Lakunza | 6640 |
| 3 | (Switzerland) Cédric Lachat | 5395 |
| 3 | (Czech Republic) Tomáš Mrázek | 5395 |
| 3 | (Netherlands) Jorg Verhoeven | 5395 |
| 6 | (Italy) Flavio Crespi | 3901 |
| 7 | (Spain) Eric Lopez Mateos | 3569 |
| 8 | (Norway) Magnus Midtboe | 3320 |

=== Women ===
68 athletes attended the women's lead competition. Angela Eiter and Muriel Sarkany topped all the routes in the qualification, semifinal, and final rounds which made them tied. So, they climbed one more time in the superfinal round where Angela Eiter took the win.

| Rank | Name | Score |
|---|---|---|
| 1 | (Austria) Angela Eiter | Top |
| 2 | (Belgium) Muriel Sarkany | Top |
| 3 | (Slovenia) Maja Vidmar | Top |
| 4 | (Japan) Yuka Kobayashi | 57- |
| 5 | (Spain) Irati Anda Villanueva | 48- |
| 6 | (Austria) Katharina Saurwein | 48- |
| 7 | (Slovenia) Natalija Gros | 45+ |
| 8 | (South Korea) Jain Kim | 40 |

== Bouldering ==
=== Men ===
131 athletes attended the men's bouldering competition.

| Rank | Name | Score |
|---|---|---|
| 1 | (Russia) Dmitrii Sharafutdinov | 4t12 4b12 |
| 2 | (Czech Republic) Martin Stráník | 4t13 4b11 |
| 3 | (Switzerland) Cédric Lachat | 3t6 3b5 |
| 4 | (France) Stephane Julien | 2t4 3b5 |
| 5 | (South Korea) Sangwon Son | 2t4 2b2 |
| 6 | (France) Daniel DU LAC | 0t 3b3 |

=== Women ===
77 athletes attended the women's bouldering competition. Anna Stöhr flashed all boulders in the final round to take the win.

| Rank | Name | Score |
|---|---|---|
| 1 | (Austria) Anna Stöhr | 4t4 4b4 |
| 2 | (Japan) Akiyo Noguchi | 4t8 4b7 |
| 3 | (Russia) Olga Bibik | 3t5 4b5 |
| 4 | (Russia) Yulia Abramchuk | 2t4 3b11 |
| 5 | (France) Juliette Danion | 1t1 4b5 |
| 6 | (Ukraine) Svitlana Tuzhylina | 1t1 3b3 |

== Speed ==
=== Men ===
70 athletes competed in the men's speed climbing event.

Round of 16
(Russia) Evgenii Vaitsekhovskii | 23.540
(Russia) Anatoly Skripov | fall
(Czech Republic) Libor Hroza | 26.890
(Ukraine) Olexiy Shulga | fall
(Ukraine) Maksym Styenkovyy | 22.700
(Russia) Alexander Peshekhonov | 24.630
(Venezuela) Manuel Escobar | 29.060
(Hong Kong) Chi-Wai Lai | fall
(China) QiXin Zhong | 21.890
(Venezuela) Leonel De Las Salas | 24.120
(Italy) Lucas Preti | 23.070
(Russia) Dmitrii Sharafutdinov | 26.030
(Russia) Alexander Kosterin | 25.190
(Poland) Tomasz Oleksy | fall
(Russia) Sergei Sinitcyn | 24.810
(Poland) Lukasz Swirk | 28.480

Quarterfinals
(Russia) Evgenii Vaitsekhovskii | 20.780
(Czech Republic) Libor Hroza | fall
(Ukraine) Maksym Styenkovyy | 22.230
(Venezuela) Manuel Escobar | 19.950
(China) QiXin Zhong | 19.900
(Italy) Lucas Preti | 21.870
(Russia) Alexander Kosterin | 21.950
(Russia) Sergei Sinitcyn | 20.940

Semifinals
(Russia) Evgenii Vaitsekhovskii | fall
(Venezuela) Manuel Escobar | 18.850
(China) QiXin Zhong | 18.890
(Russia) Sergei Sinitcyn | 21.010

Final
(Venezuela) Manuel Escobar | 18.310
(China) QiXin Zhong | 17.960
Small final
(Russia) Evgenii Vaitsekhovskii | fall
(Russia) Sergei Sinitcyn | 39.490

=== Women ===
39 athletes competed in the women's speed climbing event.

Round of 16
(China) Cuifang He | fall
(Italy) Jenny Lavarda | 53.670
(Ukraine) Olena Ryepko | fall
(Russia) Valentina Yurina | 35.300
(Ukraine) Svitlana Tuzhylina | 42.800
(Ukraine) Olga Bezhko | fall
(Poland) Edyta Ropek | 36.760
(Kazakhstan) Tamara Ulzhabayeva | 41.830
(China) Chunhua Li | 38.560
(Russia) Yana Malkova | 42.790
(Russia) Tatiana Ruyga | 36.140
(Ukraine) Ganna Savchenko | fall
(Russia) Anna Stenkovaya | fall
(Venezuela) Lucelia Blanco | 45.930
(Hong Kong) Lai-Sho Cheng | 40.270
(Venezuela) Francis Rodriguez | 41.340

Quarterfinals
(Italy) Jenny Lavarda | 45.400
(Russia) Valentina Yurina | 37.660
(Ukraine) Svitlana Tuzhylina | 37.160
(Poland) Edyta Ropek | 33.010
(China) Chunhua Li | 32.170
(Russia) Tatiana Ruyga | 31.990
(Venezuela) Lucelia Blanco | fall
(Hong Kong) Lai-Sho Cheng | 41.580

Semifinals
(Russia) Valentina Yurina | 37.290
(Poland) Edyta Ropek | 33.380
(Russia) Tatiana Ruyga | 34.490
(Hong Kong) Lai-Sho Cheng | 43.120

Final
(Poland) Edyta Ropek | 32.900
(Russia) Tatiana Ruyga | 32.750
Small final
(Russia) Valentina Yurina | 34.710
(Hong Kong) Lai-Sho Cheng | 41.870
