= Roller sports at the 2005 Asian Indoor Games =

- Venue: Suphanburi X-Games Sports Stadium
- Dates: 15–17 November 2005

Roller sports were contested as extreme sports at the 2005 Asian Indoor Games in Suphanburi X-Games Sports Stadium, Suphanburi, Thailand, from 15 November to 17 November 2005.

== Medalists ==
=== Aggressive inline ===
Event	Gold	Silver	Bronze
Park	Worapoj Boonnim; Thailand	Jeerasak Tassorn; Thailand	Hung Chien-kai; Chinese Taipei
Park best trick	Hung Chien-kai; Chinese Taipei	Worapoj Boonnim; Thailand	Jeerasak Tassorn; Thailand
Vert	Hung Chien-kai; Chinese Taipei	Cui Wento; China	Surawat Bamrungkit; Thailand

=== Skateboarding ===
Event	Gold	Silver	Bronze
Park	Che Lin; China	Julian Tamma; Indonesia	Jirawat Paoin; Thailand
Park best trick	Ahmad Fadzil Musa; Malaysia	Chen Chia-hui; Chinese Taipei	Sutat Siriwat; Thailand

== Medal table ==
Rank	Nation	Gold	Silver	Bronze	Total
1	Chinese Taipei (TPE)	2	1	1	4
2	Thailand (THA)	1	2	4	7
3	China (CHN)	1	1	0	2
4	Malaysia (MAS)	1	0	0	1
5	Indonesia (INA)	0	1	0	1
Totals (5 entries)		5	5	5	15

== Results ==
=== Aggressive inline ===
==== Park ====
15–17 November

Rank	Athlete	Prel.	Final
1st place, gold medalist(s)	Worapoj Boonnim (THA)	84.83	82.67
2nd place, silver medalist(s)	Jeerasak Tassorn (THA)	86.83	73.67
3rd place, bronze medalist(s)	Hung Chien-kai (TPE)	76.00	67.33
4	Liu Min (CHN)	66.17	67.00
5	Fazuly Sudarmaji (SIN)	65.00	65.33
6	Zhang Chi (CHN)	67.33	64.33
7	Ilman Mokhtar (MAS)	71.83	62.33
8	Fariq Mohamed Esa (MAS)	66.17	62.00
9	Syafiq Jahar (SIN)	57.83	60.67
10	Humoud Al-Qataifi (KUW)	51.83	54.33
11	Mak Wing Lun (HKG)	51.67	
12	Mohammad Al-Shatti (KUW)	46.50	
13	Shayan Nejati (IRI)	45.67	
14	Yashwanth Surapaneni (IND)	40.00	
14	Amar Nag Yama (IND)	40.00	

==== Park best trick ====
17 November

Rank	Athlete	Score
1st place, gold medalist(s)	Hung Chien-kai (TPE)	84.78
2nd place, silver medalist(s)	Worapoj Boonnim (THA)	83.56
3rd place, bronze medalist(s)	Jeerasak Tassorn (THA)	75.56
4	Shahrizal Amat (SIN)	72.11
5	Ilman Mokhtar (MAS)	71.33
6	Fariq Mohamed Esa (MAS)	69.44
7	Liu Min (CHN)	63.56
8	Zhang Chi (CHN)	62.44
9	Mak Wing Lun (HKG)	55.78
10	Syafiq Jahar (SIN)	52.11
11	Arash Salmanpour (IRI)	51.67
12	Milad Ajdari (IRI)	46.44
13	Ibrahim Al-Ansari (KUW)	40.56
14	Humoud Al-Qataifi (KUW)	30.22

==== Vert ====
15–16 November

Rank	Athlete	Prel.	Final
1st place, gold medalist(s)	Hung Chien-kai (TPE)	64.83	80.33
2nd place, silver medalist(s)	Cui Wento (CHN)	66.50	79.33
3rd place, bronze medalist(s)	Surawat Bamrungkit (THA)	72.00	74.67
4	Zhao Baoqiu (CHN)	72.17	68.33
5	Fariq Mohamed Esa (MAS)	53.83	63.33
6	Ilman Mokhtar (MAS)	51.67	63.00
7	Milad Ajdari (IRI)	51.00	61.00
8	Arash Salmanpour (IRI)	55.33	59.33
9	Shahrizal Amat (SIN)	47.67	52.00
DQ	Panumas Vairojanakich (THA)	~~73.33~~	~~81.00~~
11	Fazuly Sudarmaji (SIN)	46.00	
12	Mak Wing Lun (HKG)	42.83	
13	Ibrahim Al-Ansari (KUW)	40.67	
14	Mohammad Al-Shatti (KUW)	40.33	

- Panumas Vairojanakich of Thailand originally won the gold medal, but was disqualified after he tested positive for Cannabinoid.

=== Skateboarding ===
==== Park ====
16–17 November

Rank	Athlete	Prel.	Final
1st place, gold medalist(s)	Che Lin (CHN)	66.67	75.67
2nd place, silver medalist(s)	Julian Tamma (INA)	78.33	75.00
3rd place, bronze medalist(s)	Jirawat Paoin (THA)	69.33	73.00
4	Luk Chun Yin (HKG)	70.67	70.00
5	Jakkarin Petchvoraphon (THA)	78.00	67.67
6	Agung Hadi Broto (INA)	69.67	67.33
7	Chen Chia-hui (TPE)	66.33	66.33
8	Fuad Saifullah (MAS)	71.33	65.00
9	Izuan Musa (SIN)	64.00	64.67
10	Johnnie Tang (HKG)	71.00	63.33
11	Mohd Tafsir Mohammad (SIN)	63.33	
12	Du Minggen (CHN)	61.67	
13	Kar San Thong (MAS)	59.00	
14	Mohammad Javad Rahimi (IRI)	50.00	

==== Park best trick ====
16 November

Rank	Athlete	Score
1st place, gold medalist(s)	Ahmad Fadzil Musa (MAS)	74.56
2nd place, silver medalist(s)	Chen Chia-hui (TPE)	71.00
3rd place, bronze medalist(s)	Sutat Siriwat (THA)	68.78
4	Weerayut Eksirasuwan (THA)	67.22
5	Fuad Saifullah (MAS)	64.78
6	Nazeer Hussin (SIN)	64.33
7	Julian Tamma (INA)	64.00
8	Luk Chun Yin (HKG)	63.56
9	Che Lin (CHN)	62.44
10	Johnnie Tang (HKG)	59.67
11	Du Minggen (CHN)	58.78
12	Agung Hadi Broto (INA)	58.78
13	Syed Hadad Syed Alwi (SIN)	54.67
14	Mohammad Javad Rahimi (IRI)	51.89
