= Muriel Sarkany =

Belgian rock climber

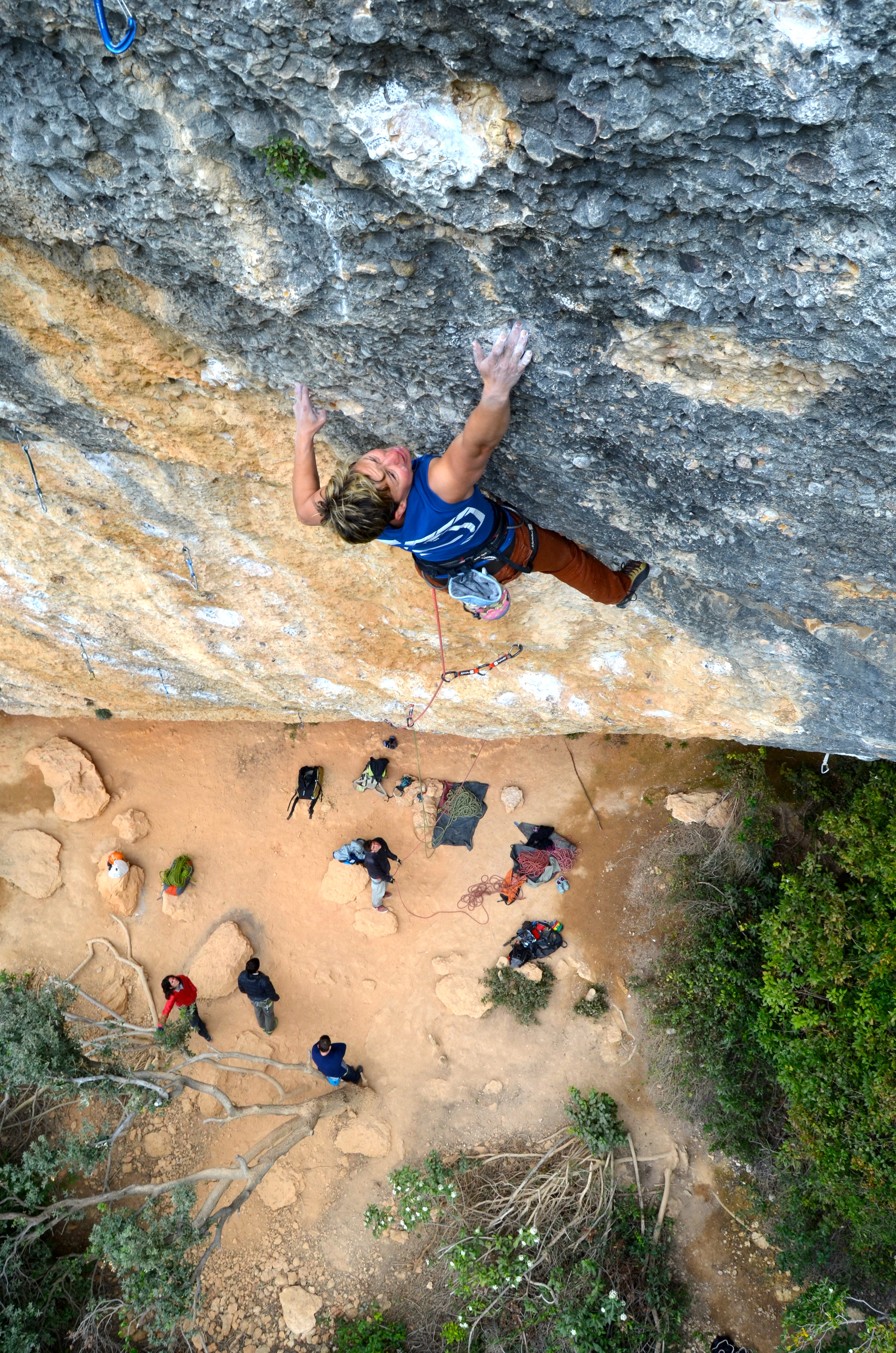
- Muriel Sarkany in 2012

Personal information
- Nationality: Belgian
- Born: August 5, 1974 (age 52) Brussels, Belgium
- Occupation: Professional rock climber
- Height: 153 cm (5 ft 0 in)
- Weight: 47 kg (104 lb)
- Website: Instagram page

Climbing career
- Type of climber: Competition lead climbing; Sport climbing
- Highest grade: Redpoint: 9a (5.14d)
- Known for: First person, male or female, to win the annual lead climbing World Cup 5 times, 4th Woman in history to climb 9a (5.14d)
Medal record
Women's competition climbing
Representing Belgium
World Cup
Winner	1997	Lead
Silver medal – second place	1998	Lead
Winner	1999	Lead
Silver medal – second place	2000	Lead
Winner	2001	Lead
Winner	2002	Lead
Winner	2003	Lead
Silver medal – second place	2004	Lead
Bronze medal – third place	2007	Lead
World Championships
Silver medal – second place	1997	Lead
Silver medal – second place	1999	Lead
Silver medal – second place	2001	Lead
Winner	2003	Lead
Silver medal – second place	2007	Lead
European Champion
Winner	1998	Lead
Bronze medal – third place	2002	Lead
Rock Master
Winner	1999	Lead
Winner	2000	Lead
Winner	2001	Lead
- Updated on October 16, 2017

Muriel Sarkany (born August 5, 1974) is a Belgian professional rock climber who specialized in competition lead climbing where she is known for winning five Climbing World Cups. She also specialized in outdoor sport climbing and is considered the fourth-ever female climber in history to redpoint a 9a (5.14d)-graded route, which was PuntX, in Gorges du Loup, in France.

== Climbing career ==
=== Competition climbing ===
Sarkany started climbing at the age of 17 and at the age of 18 started participating in international lead climbing competitions. She became Youth World Champion in Basel in 1992.

She won the silver medal three times for lead climbing at the World Championships (1997, 1999, and 2001), and the gold medal in 2003.

Sarkany was the 1998 European Lead Champion and won the bronze medal at the 2002 European Lead Championships.

After a break from competition climbing in 2005 and 2006, she returned in 2007 to win the silver medal at the World Championships in Avilles, and the bronze medal at the World Cup that year.

She won the Lead Climbing World Cup 5 times, in 1997, 1999, 2001, 2002, and 2003.

She retired in 2010, and as of 2022, still holds the record for the most Lead World Cup gold medals (male or female).

=== Rock climbing ===
After retiring from competition climbing, Sarkany devoted herself to outdoor rock climbing. In November 2013, at the age of 39, she became only the fourth woman in history to climb a 9a (5.14d) graded route when she ascended PuntX in the Gorges du Loup, France.

In 2016, at 43 years old, Sarkany ascended Era Vella in Margalef in Spain, becoming the first woman aged over 40 to climb a 9a (5.14d) graded route.

== Rankings ==
=== World Championships Lead Climbing ===
Early on, she won a gold medal in the junior category. In the adult difficulty, after three silver medals at the 1997, 1999, and 2001 UIAA Climbing World Championships, Muriel Sarkany became the 2003 World Climbing Champion and is a finalist in the 2007 IFSC Climbing World Championships.

=== Climbing World Cup ===
Muriel won 31 podiums at the World Cup of Difficulty.

- Winner of the difficulty world cup for the years 1997, 1999, 2001, 2002 and 2003.
- Silver medal for the years 1995, 1998, 2000 and 2004.
- Bronze medal in 2007.

Discipline	1993	1994	1995	1996	1997	1998	1999	2000	2001	2002	2003	2004	2005	2006	2007	2008	2009	2010
Lead	24	9	5	7	1	2	1	2	1	1	1	2	5	15	3	12	9	20

=== Climbing World Championships ===
Discipline	1993	1995	1997	1999	2001	2003	2005	2007	2009
Lead	17	4	2	2	2	1	10	2	24

=== Climbing European Championships ===
Discipline	1996	1998	2000	2002	2006	2008	2010
Lead	5	1	5	3	12	13	18
Bouldering	-	-	-	-	-	12	-

== Number of medals in the Climbing World Cup ==
=== Lead ===
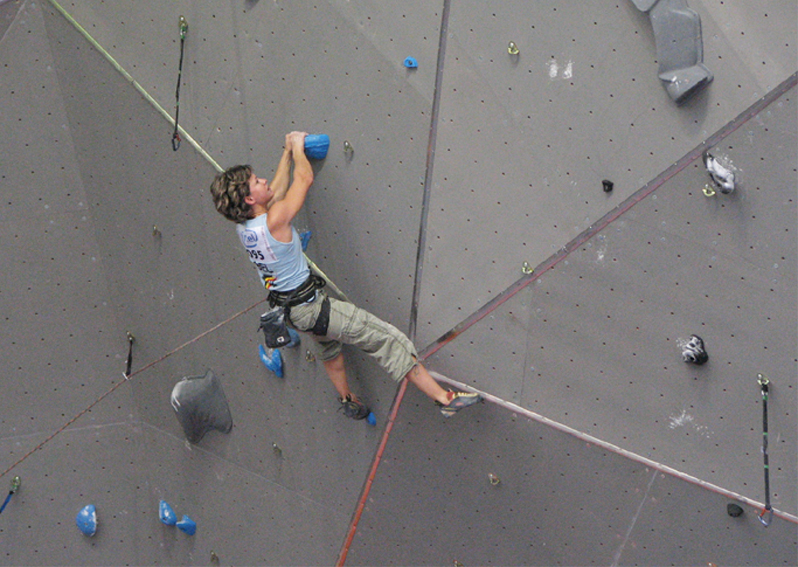
Muriel Sarkany competing in Puurs, 2007

Season	Gold	Silver	Bronze	Total
1995		2		2
1996		1		1
1997	3	1		4
1998	1	2		3
1999	1	2	1	4
2000	1	1	2	4
2001	2	3		5
2002	4	2		6
2003	5	1	1	7
2004	3	2	1	6
2006			1	1
2007		3		2
Total	21	20	6	47

== Other tributes ==
She is represented on the Fresque des Wallons painting in Namur, in Belgium.

== Rock climbing ==
=== Redpointed routes ===
9a (5.14d):

- Era Vella - Margalef (ESP) - September 2017
- Punt-X - Gorges du Loup (FRA) - November 21, 2013 - At the time, Sarkany became the 4th female climber in history to climb a 9a route.

8c+ (5.14c):

- La Rubia - Villanueva del Rosario (Andalusia, ESP) - November 2016
- Ultimate Sacrifice - Gorges du Loup (FRA) - 2012

8c (5.14b):

- Ingravids Eskerps - Santa Linya (ESP) - March 8, 2012
- Rollito Sharma Extension - Santa Linya - February 4, 2012
- Last soul sacrifice - Gorges du Loup (FRA) - September 30, 2011
- Quoussaï les maux de la fin - Gorges du Loup (FRA) - September 13, 2011
- Hot chili X - Gorges du Loup (FRA) - August 28, 2011
- Drop City - Antalya (TUR) - April 5, 2008

8b+ (5.14a):

- Hot Chilli Beans Volcano - Gorges du Loup (FRA) - August 7, 2011
- Soul Sacrifice - Gorges du Loup (FRA) - July 25, 2011
- Le mur des cyclopes - Saint-Léger-du-Ventoux(FRA)- March 10, 2011
- Collection automne hiver - Saint-Léger-du-Ventoux (FRA) - October 17, 2010
- Trio Ternura - Santa Linya (ESP) - May 31, 2010
- Rolito Sharma - Santa Linya (ESP) - December 10, 2009
- Philippe cuisinière - Rodellar (ESP) - October 3, 2009
- El chorreras - Rodellar (ESP) - September 29, 2009
- Mortal combat - Castillon (FRA) - December 10, 2003
- Skyline - Bürs (AUT) - July 18, 2003

== See also ==
- List of grade milestones in rock climbing
- History of rock climbing
- Rankings of most career IFSC gold medals
