= Desislava Bogusheva =

Bulgarian gymnastics coach

- Born: March 3, 1980 (age 46); Sofia, Bulgaria
- Occupation: President of the Bulgarian Aerobic Union World Gymnastics AER Technical Committee Member Head coach of the Thailand Aerobic Gymnastics Team
- Known for: Set the foundations of the Aerobic Gymnastics in Thailand FIG international Breve Judge Level 2[1] FIG Expert Breve holder

Desislava Vandova Bogusheva (Bulgarian: Десислава Богушева) (born 3 March 1980) is a Bulgarian gymnastics coach and choreographer, Fédération Internationale de Gymnastique (FIG) breve judge and expert breve holder. She is known as the founder of the Aerobic Gymnastics in Thailand.

On 14 July 2026, Bogusheva was elected President of the Bulgarian Aerobic Union, marking a significant milestone in her career and recognizing her long-standing contribution to the development of aerobic gymnastics in Bulgaria and abroad.

== Coaching career ==
The 12 years under Bogusheva’s leadership marked the most successful era in the history of Thai aerobic gymnastics. During her tenure as head coach of the Thailand National Aerobic Gymnastics Team, the country achieved unprecedented regional and international results. Under her guidance, Thailand won all four gold medals at both the 23rd Southeast Asian Games in Manila (2005) and the 24th Southeast Asian Games in Nakhon Ratchasima (2007). During Bogusheva’s tenure, Thai aerobic gymnastics athletes reached several historic international milestones, including Thailand’s first World Championship finalist in 2010 and its highest World Championship ranking ever, achieved in 2014.

== FIG Expert career ==
In December 2012, Bogusheva completed the Fédération Internationale de Gymnastique (FIG) Coaching Academy at Level 3, obtaining the qualification of Expert Brevet. This certification represents the highest coaching accreditation awarded by FIG within the Academy structure. In July 2018, Bogusheva began serving as a lecturer and leader within the FIG Coaching Academy, overseeing the instruction, assessment, and professional development of international coaches.

List of assignments:

- AGU AER common training camp in Almaty, Kazakhstan,
- FIG Academy Level 1 in Baku, Azerbaijan.
- FIG AER Age Group development camp in Harare, Zimbabwe
- FIG AER Age Group development camp in Brits, RSA
- FIG AER Age Group development camp in Hanoi, VIE.
- FIG Academy Level 3 in Hai Phong, Vietnam

== Achievements ==
- Between 2006 and 2016, Bogusheva served as the head coach of the Thailand National Aerobic Gymnastics team. During this decade, she led the national squad through three Southeast Asian Games, three Asian Indoor Games, multiple World Cup events, and six World Championships.
- At the 23rd Southeast Asian Games held in Manila, Philippines, in 2005, the Thailand National Aerobic Gymnastics team secured all four gold medals across the four contested categories.
- At the 24th Southeast Asian Games in Nakhon Ratchasima (Korat), Thailand, in 2007, the Thailand National Aerobic Gymnastics team defended their titles by winning all four gold medals across the four contested categories.
- 11th Aerobic gymnastic World championship Rodez (France) 201, her student Roypim Ngampeerapong qualified for the finals in Individual Woman category. She became the first gymnast in the history of Thailand to qualify for the World Championship's finals, which was awarded by the International Gymnastics Federation FIG with the title "World class gymnast"
- 9th World Games Cali 2013 (Colombia), Roypim Ngampeerapong and Nattawut Pimpa marked the first ever participation of Thai gymnasts at the World Games. The qualification for the Games is based on the top 8 athletes ranked from the previous World Championship.
- 13th Aerobic gymnastic World championship Cancun (MEX) 2014 - Roypim Ngmapeerapong scored the best ever result in the history of Thailand by ranking 5th in the Individual Woman category.

== Notable students ==
Since Bogusheva's appointment as head coach of Thailand's Aerobic Gymnastics, Thailand has had an international success. Notable students include:

- Roypim Ngampeerapong (born in 1989) - recognised by FIG as a World Class Gymnast, multiple World Cup medalist, participated in 5 World Championship 2006 - 2014
  - First ever Thai gymnast qualified for the World Championship's Finals - Rodez 2010
  - Ranked 5th in the individual women category at the 13th Aerobic Gymnastics World Championship Cancun (Mexico) 2014, highest finish ever for Thailand
- Nattawut Pimpa (born in 1986) - 2005 and 2007 Sea Games gold medalist, multiple World Cup medalist, participated at six world championships
  - Became famous as the first Thai gymnast to have an element named after him in the aerobic gymnastics code of points, awarded by FIG with the highest possible score of 1.0 point per single skill

== FIG TC ==
On November 6, 2021, at the 83rd FIG Congress in Antalya, Turkey, Desislava Bogusheva was elected as Aerobic Gymnastics Technical Committee Member. The Congress ratified the decision of the FIG Executive Committee to reduce the next terms of office for all positions to three years instead of four, in order to correspond with the Olympic cycle leading up to the Paris 2024 Olympic Games.

On October 25. 2024, at the 85th FIG Congress in Doha, Qatar, Desislava Bogusheva was re-elected as Aerobic Gymnastics Technical Committee.
