= 1999 UIAA Climbing World Championships =

Speed climbing championships

- Venue: National Indoor Arena
- Location: Birmingham, United Kingdom
- Date: 2 – 3 December 1999
- Competitors: 180 from 30 nations

The 1999 UIAA Climbing World Championships, the 5th edition, were held in Birmingham, United Kingdom from 2 to 3 December 1999. It was organized by the Union Internationale des Associations d'Alpinisme (UIAA). The championships consisted of lead and speed events.

== Medalists ==
Event	Gold	Silver	Bronze
Men's Lead	Bernardino Lagni; Italy	Yuji Hirayama; Japan	Maksym Petrenko; Ukraine
Men's Speed	Vladimir Zakharov; Ukraine	Vladimir Netsvetaev-Dolgalev; Russia	Alexey Gadeev; Russia
Women's Lead	Liv Sansoz (2); France	Muriel Sarkany; Belgium	Elena Ovtchinnikova; United States
Women's Speed	Olga Zakharova; Ukraine	Olena Ryepko; Ukraine	Natalia Novikova; Russia

== Lead ==
In men's lead, Bernardino Lagni triumphed over Yuji Hirayama who took silver and Maksym Petrenko who took bronze.

In women's lead, Liv Sansoz won and defended her title. Muriel Sarkany took silver and Elena Ovtchinnikova took bronze.

Men				Women			
Rank	Name	Nation	Result	Rank	Name	Nation	Result
1st place, gold medalist(s)	Bernardino Lagni	Italy	8200	1st place, gold medalist(s)	Liv Sansoz	France	7900
2nd place, silver medalist(s)	Yuji Hirayama	Japan	6560	2nd place, silver medalist(s)	Muriel Sarkany	Belgium	6320
3rd place, bronze medalist(s)	Maksym Petrenko	Ukraine	5330	3rd place, bronze medalist(s)	Elena Ovtchinnikova	United States	5135
4	Arnaud Petit	France	4510	4	Marietta Uhden	Germany	4345
5	Cristian Brenna	Italy	4182	5	Annatina Schultz	Switzerland	4029
6	Alexandre Chabot	France	3854	6	Martina Cufar	Slovenia	3713
7	Christian Bindhammer	Germany	3526	7	Delphine Martin	France	3397
8	Dai Koyamada	Japan	3280	8	Josune Bereciartu Urruzola	Spain	3160
9	Andreas Bindhammer	Germany	3034	9	Sandrine Levet	France	2923
9	Salavat Rakhmetov	Russia	3034	10	Damaris Knorr	Germany	2686

== Speed ==
In men's speed, Vladimir Zakharov triumphed over Vladimir Netsvetaev-Dolgalev who took silver and Alexei Gadeev who took bronze.

In women's speed, Olga Zakharova triumphed over Olena Ryepko who took silver and Natalia Novikova who took bronze.

Men				Women			
Rank	Name	Nation	Result	Rank	Name	Nation	Result
1st place, gold medalist(s)	Vladimir Zakharov	Ukraine	6900	1st place, gold medalist(s)	Olga Zakharova	Ukraine	7400
2nd place, silver medalist(s)	Vladimir Netsvetaev-Dolgalev	Russia	5520	2nd place, silver medalist(s)	Olena Ryepko	Ukraine	5920
3rd place, bronze medalist(s)	Alexei Gadeev	Russia	4485	3rd place, bronze medalist(s)	Natalia Novikova	Russia	4810
4	Andrey Vedenmeer	Ukraine	3795	4	Zosia Podgorbounskikh	Russia	4070
5	Yevgen Kryvosheytsev	Ukraine	3519	5	Olena Ostapenko	Ukraine	3774
5	Tomasz Oleksy	Poland	3519	5	Nataliya Perlova	Ukraine	3774
5	Iakov Soubbotine	Russia	3519	5	Mayya Piratinskaya	Russia	3774
5	Maksym Styenkovyy	Ukraine	3519	5	Renata Piszczek	Poland	3774
9	Daniel Andrada Jimenez	Spain	2553	9	Kim Anthoni	Belgium	2738
9	Dmitrii Bychkov	Russia	2553	9	Olga Bibik	Russia	2738
9	Mathieu Dutray	France	2553	9	Mariana Ene	Romania	2738
9	Luca Giupponi	Italy	2553	9	Mi-Sun Go	South Korea	2738
9	Csaba Komondi	Hungary	2553	9	Jitka Kuhngaberova	Czech Republic	2738
9	César Ciudad Manzanedo	Spain	2553	9	Berta Martin Sancho	Spain	2738
9	Lukasz Müller	Poland	2553	9	Tatiana Ruyga	Russia	2738
9	Alexandr Paukaev	Ukraine	2553	9	Svetlana Sutkina	Russia	2738
