= Dancesport at the 2005 Asian Indoor Games =

- Venue: Indoor Stadium Huamark
- Dates: 14–15 November 2005

Dancesport at the 2005 Asian Indoor Games was held in Indoor Stadium Huamark, Bangkok, Thailand from 14 November to 15 November 2005.

== Medalists ==
=== Standard ===
Event	Gold	Silver	Bronze
Five dances	China; Zhou Jitian; Sun Yajie	Japan; Kazuki Sugaya; Ikuyo Ozaki	Japan; Takeo Wachi; Kiriko Wachi
Quickstep	Japan; Ryo Yoshikawa; Nao Shirai	South Korea; Yun Hak-jun; Park Eun-jung	China; Wu Zhian; Zheng Cen
Slow foxtrot	Japan; Takeo Wachi; Kiriko Wachi	China; Shen Hong; Liang Yujie	Kazakhstan; Anton Mayantsev; Irina Gareyeva
Tango	China; Wu Zhian; Zheng Cen	Kazakhstan; Yevgeniy Plokhikh; Yelena Klyuchnikova	Japan; Akira Ito; Yukiko Miyamoto
Viennese waltz	China; Zhao Lei; Wang Yang	Kazakhstan; Khamit Bekezhanov; Natalya Menshikova	Japan; Ryo Yoshikawa; Nao Shirai
Waltz	Japan; Kazuki Sugaya; Ikuyo Ozaki	Kazakhstan; Bogdan Taranyuk; Karina Bakenova	China; Shen Hong; Liang Yujie

=== Latin ===
Event	Gold	Silver	Bronze
Five dances	Japan; Masaki Seko; Chiaki Seko	China; Lu Ning; Wei Wei	South Korea; Park Ji-woo; Park Ji-eun
Cha-cha-cha	China; Wang Wei; Chen Jin	China; Wei Bin; Liu Xiaoting	South Korea; Jung Hee-jung; Kim Hyun-jin
Jive	Japan; Masaki Seko; Chiaki Seko	China; Wang Wei; Chen Jin	Thailand; Theerawut Thommuangpak; Phuthinat Khanitnusorn
Paso doble	Chinese Taipei; Wang Yu-hung; Hsiao Yuan-ju	Thailand; Watcharakorn Suasuebpun; Warapa Jumbala	China; Zhao Yao; Zhu Lin
Rumba	China; Lu Ning; Wei Wei	South Korea; Park Ji-woo; Park Ji-eun	Thailand; Theerawut Thommuangpak; Phuthinat Khanitnusorn
Samba	China; Li Wen; Xu Zhuoya	China; Wei Bin; Liu Xiaoting	Thailand; Watcharakorn Suasuebpun; Warapa Jumbala

== Medal table ==
Rank	Nation	Gold	Silver	Bronze	Total
1	China (CHN)	6	5	3	14
2	Japan (JPN)	5	1	3	9
3	Chinese Taipei (TPE)	1	0	0	1
4	Kazakhstan (KAZ)	0	3	1	4
5	South Korea (KOR)	0	2	2	4
6	Thailand (THA)	0	1	3	4
Totals (6 entries)		12	12	12	36

== Results ==
=== Standard ===
==== Five dances ====
15 November

Rank	Team	QF	SF	Final
1st place, gold medalist(s)	Zhou Jitian / Sun Yajie (CHN)	45	40	6
2nd place, silver medalist(s)	Kazuki Sugaya / Ikuyo Ozaki (JPN)	45	41	11
3rd place, bronze medalist(s)	Takeo Wachi / Kiriko Wachi (JPN)	45	40	13
4	Yun Hak-jun / Park Eun-jung (KOR)	45	41	23
5	Anton Mayantsev / Irina Gareyeva (KAZ)	45	26	27
6	Bogdan Taranyuk / Karina Bakenova (KAZ)	45	29	27
7	Shin Kyung-shik / Kim Min-jung (KOR)	44	26	33
8	Apichai Promboon / Tanyaporn Kuituan (THA)	38	13	
9	Pongsan Ketsarapong / Prachayapron Songsawang (THA)	38	8	
10	George Yip / Rainbow Ho (HKG)	33	3	
10	Rico Rosima / Filomena Salvador (PHI)	38	3	
12	Emmanuel Reyes / Maira Rosete (PHI)	43	0	
13	Anthony Chua / Anita Tan (MAS)	22		
14	Casey Lim / Fabiola Ong (MAS)	7		
14	Richard Tan / Jenny Tong (SIN)	7		
16	Kuoc Wai Hong / Chan Iut Tim (MAC)	0		

==== Quickstep ====
14 November

===== Semifinals =====
Rank	Team	Score
1	Ryo Yoshikawa / Nao Shirai (JPN)	9
1	Wu Zhian / Zheng Cen (CHN)	9
3	Yevgeniy Plokhikh / Yelena Klyuchnikova (KAZ)	8
4	Yun Hak-jun / Park Eun-jung (KOR)	7
4	Yuan Chengjun / Su Na (CHN)	7
4	Hisayuki Toyama / Satomi Toyama (JPN)	7
7	Pongsan Ketsarapong / Prachayapron Songsawang (THA)	6
8	Brian Ocana / Karla Ocana (PHI)	1
9	Kuoc Wai Hong / Chan Iut Tim (MAC)	0
9	Yap Soon Ann / Kuan Yoke Hoi (MAS)	0
9	Tarasai Sukdee / Sininat Mami (THA)	0

===== Final =====
Rank	Team	Places					
Rank	Team	1	1–2	1–3	1–4	1–5	1–6
1st place, gold medalist(s)	Ryo Yoshikawa / Nao Shirai (JPN)	4	7				
2nd place, silver medalist(s)	Yun Hak-jun / Park Eun-jung (KOR)	3	4	5			
3rd place, bronze medalist(s)	Wu Zhian / Zheng Cen (CHN)	2	3	5			
4	Hisayuki Toyama / Satomi Toyama (JPN)	0	1	3	5	8	
5	Yevgeniy Plokhikh / Yelena Klyuchnikova (KAZ)	0	1	3	5	7	
6	Yuan Chengjun / Su Na (CHN)	0	2	3	3	5	

==== Slow foxtrot ====
14 November

===== Final =====
Rank	Team	Places					
Rank	Team	1	1–2	1–3	1–4	1–5	1–6
1st place, gold medalist(s)	Takeo Wachi / Kiriko Wachi (JPN)	5					
2nd place, silver medalist(s)	Shen Hong / Liang Yujie (CHN)	4	8				
3rd place, bronze medalist(s)	Anton Mayantsev / Irina Gareyeva (KAZ)	0	2	5			
4	Zhao Lei / Wang Yang (CHN)	0	1	3	7		
5	Akira Ito / Yukiko Miyamoto (JPN)	0	0	3	4	7	
6	Kim Ju-sup / Kim Ok-yeop (KOR)	0	2	3	3	5	

==== Tango ====
14 November

===== Preliminaries =====
Rank	Team	QF	SF
1	Wu Zhian / Zheng Cen (CHN)	9	9
2	Yevgeniy Plokhikh / Yelena Klyuchnikova (KAZ)	9	8
3	Shin Kyung-shik / Kim Min-jung (KOR)	9	7
4	Akira Ito / Yukiko Miyamoto (JPN)	9	6
4	Emmanuel Reyes / Maira Rosete (PHI)	9	6
6	Pawatpong Racha-apai / Thitiyapa Potimu (THA)	9	5
6	Yuan Chengjun / Su Na (CHN)	9	5
6	Tarasai Sukdee / Sininat Mami (THA)	9	5
9	Hisayuki Toyama / Satomi Toyama (JPN)	9	3
10	Wang Hong Xing / Chen Gui Jie (MAC)	6	0
10	Rommel Ybalio / Johncy Majam (PHI)	7	0
10	Richard Tan / Jenny Tong (SIN)	7	0
13	Casey Lim / Fabiola Ong (MAS)	4	
14	Lei Peng Seng / Chi Pui Man (MAC)	3	

===== Final =====
Rank	Team	Places							
Rank	Team	1	1–2	1–3	1–4	1–5	1–6	1–7	1–8
1st place, gold medalist(s)	Wu Zhian / Zheng Cen (CHN)	4	5						
2nd place, silver medalist(s)	Yevgeniy Plokhikh / Yelena Klyuchnikova (KAZ)	2	5						
3rd place, bronze medalist(s)	Akira Ito / Yukiko Miyamoto (JPN)	1	3	4	5				
4	Shin Kyung-shik / Kim Min-jung (KOR)	1	2	3	5				
5	Yuan Chengjun / Su Na (CHN)	0	1	2	3	5			
6	Emmanuel Reyes / Maira Rosete (PHI)	0	0	0	2	3	7		
7	Tarasai Sukdee / Sininat Mami (THA)	0	1	1	1	1	5		
8	Pawatpong Racha-apai / Thitiyapa Potimu (THA)	1	1	1	3	4	4	6	

==== Viennese waltz ====
14 November

===== Final =====
Rank	Team	Places						
Rank	Team	1	1–2	1–3	1–4	1–5	1–6	1–7
1st place, gold medalist(s)	Zhao Lei / Wang Yang (CHN)	6						
2nd place, silver medalist(s)	Khamit Bekezhanov / Natalya Menshikova (KAZ)	0	3	6				
3rd place, bronze medalist(s)	Ryo Yoshikawa / Nao Shirai (JPN)	0	2	4	8			
4	Naohiro Okubo / Ryoko Okuno (JPN)	2	3	4	5			
5	Thepporn Mokkuntod / Jaroonrat Sinjaroen (THA)	1	1	3	4	5		
6	Choi Ki-on / An Mi-ra (KOR)	0	1	1	2	5		
7	Apichai Promboon / Tanyaporn Kuituan (THA)	0	0	1	2	3	5	

==== Waltz ====
14 November

===== Preliminaries =====
Rank	Team	QF	SF
1	Kazuki Sugaya / Ikuyo Ozaki (JPN)	9	9
1	Bogdan Taranyuk / Karina Bakenova (KAZ)	9	9
3	Zhou Jitian / Sun Yajie (CHN)	9	8
3	Shen Hong / Liang Yujie (CHN)	9	8
5	Kim Ju-sup / Kim Ok-yeop (KOR)	9	5
6	Choi Ki-on / An Mi-ra (KOR)	9	4
6	Naohiro Okubo / Ryoko Okuno (JPN)	9	4
8	Khamit Bekezhanov / Natalya Menshikova (KAZ)	7	3
9	Thepporn Mokkuntod / Jaroonrat Sinjaroen (THA)	9	2
10	George Yip / Rainbow Ho (HKG)	8	1
10	Worapong Chariyathamarat / Sulak Chariyathamarat (THA)	8	1
12	Wang Hong Xing / Chen Gui Jie (MAC)	4	0
13	Yap Soon Ann / Kuan Yoke Hoi (MAS)	3	
14	Lei Peng Seng / Chi Pui Man (MAC)	2	
14	Brian Ocana / Karla Ocana (PHI)	2	
14	Robert Masanque / Floralyn Lagario (PHI)	2	

===== Final =====
Rank	Team	Places						
Rank	Team	1	1–2	1–3	1–4	1–5	1–6	1–7
1st place, gold medalist(s)	Kazuki Sugaya / Ikuyo Ozaki (JPN)	4	5					
2nd place, silver medalist(s)	Bogdan Taranyuk / Karina Bakenova (KAZ)	1	4	7				
3rd place, bronze medalist(s)	Shen Hong / Liang Yujie (CHN)	2	4	6				
4	Zhou Jitian / Sun Yajie (CHN)	2	4	5				
5	Kim Ju-sup / Kim Ok-yeop (KOR)	0	1	1	1	5		
6	Naohiro Okubo / Ryoko Okuno (JPN)	0	0	1	1	4	8	
7	Choi Ki-on / An Mi-ra (KOR)	0	0	0	1	2	5	

=== Latin ===
==== Five dances ====
14 November

Rank	Team	QF	SF	Final
1st place, gold medalist(s)	Masaki Seko / Chiaki Seko (JPN)	45	41	6
2nd place, silver medalist(s)	Lu Ning / Wei Wei (CHN)	45	44	9
3rd place, bronze medalist(s)	Park Ji-woo / Park Ji-eun (KOR)	45	43	15
4	Jung Hee-jung / Kim Hyun-jin (KOR)	42	30	21.5
5	Michael Mendoza / Belinda Adora (PHI)	41	16	26.5
6	Khamit Bekezhanov / Natalya Menshikova (KAZ)	37	22	27
7	Yevgeniy Plokhikh / Yelena Klyuchnikova (KAZ)	42	15	
7	John Erolle Melencio / Dearlie Gerodias (PHI)	44	15	
9	Akihiro Takahashi / Yoshiko Kido (JPN)	43	14	
10	Nguyễn Hải Anh / Nguyễn Hồng Thi (VIE)	38	13	
10	Worapoj Jariyathamrat / Ramon Wattanavikorn (THA)	33	13	
12	Bandit Chaimuti / Nathaihai Chaimuti (THA)	44	4	
13	Benedict Lau / Jovienne Ee (MAS)	22		
14	Jonathan Fam / Therese Tan (MAS)	17		
15	Lã Quý Lâm / Vũ Hoài Phương (VIE)	2		
16	Tse Kin Fai / Choi Lai Fong (MAC)	1		

==== Cha-cha-cha ====
15 November

===== Semifinals =====
Rank	Team	Score
1	Jung Hee-jung / Kim Hyun-jin (KOR)	9
2	Wei Bin / Liu Xiaoting (CHN)	8
3	Anton Mayantsev / Irina Gareyeva (KAZ)	7
3	Tsuneki Masatani / Takako Yamada (JPN)	7
5	Wang Wei / Chen Jin (CHN)	6
6	Thanarat Mahattanon / Salin Subrungruang (THA)	5
7	Roger Kwa / Connie Tan (SIN)	4
8	Kazuhiko Natsumi / Kyoko Yanagihori (JPN)	2
8	Melvin de la Serna / Vangilyn Cenina (PHI)	2
8	Ng Wey Keen / Edna Lee (SIN)	2
11	Dickson Zhou / Michelle Loi (MAC)	1
11	Worapoj Jariyathamrat / Ramon Wattanavikorn (THA)	1
13	Ronnie Vergara / Carol Bacera (PHI)	0

===== Final =====
Rank	Team	Places					
Rank	Team	1	1–2	1–3	1–4	1–5	1–6
1st place, gold medalist(s)	Wang Wei / Chen Jin (CHN)	2	5				
2nd place, silver medalist(s)	Wei Bin / Liu Xiaoting (CHN)	1	5				
3rd place, bronze medalist(s)	Jung Hee-jung / Kim Hyun-jin (KOR)	2	3	6			
4	Thanarat Mahattanon / Salin Subrungruang (THA)	3	3	5			
5	Tsuneki Masatani / Takako Yamada (JPN)	0	1	3	5		
6	Anton Mayantsev / Irina Gareyeva (KAZ)	1	1	2	3	6	

==== Jive ====
15 November

===== Semifinals =====
Rank	Team	Score
1	Masaki Seko / Chiaki Seko (JPN)	9
2	Khamit Bekezhanov / Natalya Menshikova (KAZ)	8
3	Wang Wei / Chen Jin (CHN)	7
4	Thanarat Mahattanon / Salin Subrungruang (THA)	6
5	Bae Ji-ho / Choi Song-hwa (KOR)	5
5	Theerawut Thommuangpak / Phuthinat Khanitnusorn (THA)	5
7	John Erolle Melencio / Dearlie Gerodias (PHI)	4
7	Melvin Tan / Sharon Tan (SIN)	4
9	Li Wen / Xu Zhuoya (CHN)	3
10	Micheal Yong / Janet Gooi (MAS)	2
11	Naoya Igarashi / Asuka Uemura (JPN)	1
12	Chan Meng Tou / Ho Fong I (MAC)	0
12	Larry Iguidez / Lilibeth Lalic (PHI)	0

===== Final =====
Rank	Team	Places					
Rank	Team	1	1–2	1–3	1–4	1–5	1–6
1st place, gold medalist(s)	Masaki Seko / Chiaki Seko (JPN)	8					
2nd place, silver medalist(s)	Wang Wei / Chen Jin (CHN)	1	4	6			
3rd place, bronze medalist(s)	Theerawut Thommuangpak / Phuthinat Khanitnusorn (THA)	0	3	4	7		
4	Khamit Bekezhanov / Natalya Menshikova (KAZ)	0	1	3	6		
5	Bae Ji-ho / Choi Song-hwa (KOR)	0	1	3	4	6	
6	Thanarat Mahattanon / Salin Subrungruang (THA)	0	1	2	3	6	

==== Paso doble ====
15 November

===== Semifinals =====
Rank	Team	Score
1	Wang Yu-hung / Hsiao Yuan-ju (TPE)	9
2	Zhao Yao / Zhu Lin (CHN)	7
3	Akihiro Takahashi / Yoshiko Kido (JPN)	6
3	Michael Mendoza / Belinda Adora (PHI)	6
3	Watcharakorn Suasuebpun / Warapa Jumbala (THA)	6
6	Plokhikh / Klyuchnikova (KAZ)	5
6	Kim Kwang-sick / Jo You-in (KOR)	5
8	Kazuhiko Natsumi / Kyoko Yanagihori (JPN)	3
8	Roger Kwa / Connie Tan (SIN)	3
10	Chongpisut Jetphukthai / Pinklao Nararak (THA)	2
11	Richard Rey Obong / Jenevieve Camacho (PHI)	1
11	Nguyễn Hải Anh / Nguyễn Hồng Thi (VIE)	1
13	Benedict Lau / Jovienne Ee (MAS)	0

===== Final =====
Rank	Team	Places						
Rank	Team	1	1–2	1–3	1–4	1–5	1–6	1–7
1st place, gold medalist(s)	Wang Yu-hung / Hsiao Yuan-ju (TPE)	1	6					
2nd place, silver medalist(s)	Watcharakorn Suasuebpun / Warapa Jumbala (THA)	3	4	6	8			
3rd place, bronze medalist(s)	Zhao Yao / Zhu Lin (CHN)	3	4	6	6			
4	Kim Kwang-sick / Jo You-in (KOR)	2	3	5				
5	Akihiro Takahashi / Yoshiko Kido (JPN)	0	0	1	3	6		
6	Yevgeniy Plokhikh / Yelena Klyuchnikova (KAZ)	0	1	2	4	5		
7	Michael Mendoza / Belinda Adora (PHI)	0	0	1	3	5		

==== Rumba ====
15 November

===== Preliminaries =====
Rank	Team	QF	SF
1	Lu Ning / Wei Wei (CHN)	9	9
1	Park Ji-woo / Park Ji-eun (KOR)	9	9
3	Zhao Yao / Zhu Lin (CHN)	9	6
3	Theerawut Thommuangpak / Phuthinat Khanitnusorn (THA)	6	6
5	Anton Mayantsev / Irina Gareyeva (KAZ)	8	5
5	Melvin Tan / Sharon Tan (SIN)	8	5
7	Yoshikazu Jimenji / Ryoko Jimenji (JPN)	6	4
7	Bogdan Taranyuk / Karina Bakenova (KAZ)	8	4
9	Bandit Chaimuti / Nathaihai Chaimuti (THA)	8	2
10	Naoya Igarashi / Asuka Uemura (JPN)	7	1
10	Dickson Zhou / Michelle Loi (MAC)	7	1
10	Micheal Yong / Janet Gooi (MAS)	7	1
10	Richard Rey Obong / Jenevieve Camacho (PHI)	8	1
14	Larry Iguidez / Lilibeth Lalic (PHI)	5	
15	Ng Wey Keen / Edna Lee (SIN)	2	
16	Lã Quý Lâm / Vũ Hoài Phương (VIE)	1	
17	Chan Meng Tou / Ho Fong I (MAC)	0	

===== Final =====
Rank	Team	Places					
Rank	Team	1	1–2	1–3	1–4	1–5	1–6
1st place, gold medalist(s)	Lu Ning / Wei Wei (CHN)	7					
2nd place, silver medalist(s)	Park Ji-woo / Park Ji-eun (KOR)	2	4	7			
3rd place, bronze medalist(s)	Theerawut Thommuangpak / Phuthinat Khanitnusorn (THA)	0	2	4	7		
4	Zhao Yao / Zhu Lin (CHN)	0	3	3	5		
5	Melvin Tan / Sharon Tan (SIN)	0	0	3	5		
6	Anton Mayantsev / Irina Gareyeva (KAZ)	0	0	1	1	5	

==== Samba ====
15 November

===== Preliminaries =====
Rank	Team	QF	SF	Add
1	Wang Yu-hung / Hsiao Yuan-ju (TPE)	9	7	7
1	Watcharakorn Suasuebpun / Warapa Jumbala (THA)	9	6	7
3	Wei Bin / Liu Xiaoting (CHN)	9	7	6
3	Li Wen / Xu Zhuoya (CHN)	9	6	6
3	Tsuneki Masatani / Takako Yamada (JPN)	9	5	6
6	Bae Ji-ho / Choi Song-hwa (KOR)	8	5	5
7	Kim Kwang-sick / Jo You-in (KOR)	9	5	4
8	Bogdan Taranyuk / Karina Bakenova (KAZ)	7	5	2
8	Chongpisut Jetphukthai / Pinklao Nararak (THA)	8	5	2
10	Yoshikazu Jimenji / Ryoko Jimenji (JPN)	9	2	
11	Melvin de la Serna / Vangilyn Cenina (PHI)	9	1	
12	Ronnie Vergara / Carol Bacera (PHI)	9	0	
13	Jonathan Fam / Therese Tan (MAS)	3		
14	Tse Kin Fai / Choi Lai Fong (MAC)	1		

===== Final =====
Rank	Team	Places					
Rank	Team	1	1–2	1–3	1–4	1–5	1–6
1st place, gold medalist(s)	Li Wen / Xu Zhuoya (CHN)	2	7				
2nd place, silver medalist(s)	Wei Bin / Liu Xiaoting (CHN)	3	4	5			
3rd place, bronze medalist(s)	Watcharakorn Suasuebpun / Warapa Jumbala (THA)	1	2	5			
4	Tsuneki Masatani / Takako Yamada (JPN)	1	3	4	6		
5	Wang Yu-hung / Hsiao Yuan-ju (TPE)	2	2	4	5		
6	Bae Ji-ho / Choi Song-hwa (KOR)	0	0	1	2	6	
