= Muaythai at the 2005 Asian Indoor Games =

- Venue: Saphan Hin Sports Complex
- Dates: 13–18 November 2005

Muaythai at the 2005 Asian Indoor Games was held in Saphan Hin Sports Complex, Phuket, Thailand from 13 November to 18 November 2005.

== Medalists ==
=== Wai kru ===
Event	Gold	Silver	Bronze
Flyweight; 48–51 kg	Boonnue Sowatee; Thailand	Khamla Souphaphone; Laos	Dilshodbek Mirzaev; Uzbekistan
Bantamweight; 51–54 kg	Artit Mennoi; Thailand	Khammouane Khonavanh; Laos	Kamal Singh Thakur; India
Featherweight; 55–57 kg	Raktha Mennoi; Thailand	Langsanh Masopha; Laos	Sathish Kumar Mani; India
Lightweight; 58–61 kg	Sawai Atto; Thailand	Varun Kumar Barnwal; India	Cheong Long; Macau
Welterweight; 63–66 kg	Thailand	Wu Chi Kit; Macau	Haidar Mohammed; Iraq
Light middleweight 67–71 kg	Sandeep Shukla; India	Saydulla Ismatullaev; Uzbekistan	Mohammad Al-Failakawi; Kuwait
Middleweight; 71–75 kg	Umidjon Hatamov; Uzbekistan	Vinay Kumar; India	Riadh Mohammed; Iraq
Cruiserweight; 79–86 kg	Billy Alumno; Philippines	Mohammed Kadhim; Iraq	Ali Al-Tamari; Jordan

=== Combat ===
Event	Gold	Silver	Bronze
Flyweight; 48–51 kg	Surasak Sansang; Thailand	Bounngieam Sovo Rasing; Laos	Khurshid Eshankhodjaev; Uzbekistan
Flyweight; 48–51 kg	Surasak Sansang; Thailand	Bounngieam Sovo Rasing; Laos	Albert Kujur; India
Bantamweight; 51–54 kg	Veerapol Kwangkwang; Thailand	Phanvilay Rattanabounmy; Laos	Almas Sakayev; Kazakhstan
Bantamweight; 51–54 kg	Veerapol Kwangkwang; Thailand	Phanvilay Rattanabounmy; Laos	Ismail Moein; Jordan
Featherweight; 55–57 kg	None awarded	Masoud Izadi; Iran	Sathish Kumar Mani; India
Featherweight; 55–57 kg	None awarded	Masoud Izadi; Iran	Xanxai Boonthavy; Laos
Lightweight; 58–61 kg	Mavlonbek Kahhorov; Uzbekistan	Nurtay Yesbolsynov; Kazakhstan	Talal Anaqreh; Jordan
Lightweight; 58–61 kg	Mavlonbek Kahhorov; Uzbekistan	Nurtay Yesbolsynov; Kazakhstan	Kowit Tabtub; Thailand
Welterweight; 63–66 kg	Kriangsak Ananoo; Thailand	Haidar Mohammed; Iraq	Ruben Sumido; Philippines
Welterweight; 63–66 kg	Kriangsak Ananoo; Thailand	Haidar Mohammed; Iraq	Ali Al-Foudari; Kuwait
Light middleweight 67–71 kg	Dias Kassenov; Kazakhstan	Mohammad Al-Failakawi; Kuwait	India
Light middleweight 67–71 kg	Dias Kassenov; Kazakhstan	Mohammad Al-Failakawi; Kuwait	Michihito Abe; Japan
Middleweight; 71–75 kg	Almas Kassenov; Kazakhstan	Vahid Roshani; Iran	Harully Asatullaev; Uzbekistan
Middleweight; 71–75 kg	Almas Kassenov; Kazakhstan	Vahid Roshani; Iran	Billy Alumno; Philippines
Light heavyweight 76–79 kg	Jad Al-Wahash; Jordan	Riadh Mohammed; Iraq	India
Light heavyweight 76–79 kg	Jad Al-Wahash; Jordan	Riadh Mohammed; Iraq	None awarded
Cruiserweight; 79–86 kg	Abdolvahab Maroufi; Iran	Ali Al-Tamari; Jordan	Mohammed Kadhim; Iraq
Cruiserweight; 79–86 kg	Abdolvahab Maroufi; Iran	Ali Al-Tamari; Jordan	None awarded

== Medal table ==
Rank	Nation	Gold	Silver	Bronze	Total
1	Thailand (THA)	8	0	1	9
2	Uzbekistan (UZB)	2	1	3	6
3	Kazakhstan (KAZ)	2	1	1	4
4	India (IND)	1	2	6	9
5	Iran (IRI)	1	2	0	3
6	Jordan (JOR)	1	1	3	5
7	Philippines (PHI)	1	0	2	3
8	Laos (LAO)	0	5	1	6
9	Iraq (IRQ)	0	3	3	6
10	Kuwait (KUW)	0	1	2	3
11	Macau (MAC)	0	1	1	2
12	Japan (JPN)	0	0	1	1
Totals (12 entries)		16	17	24	57

== Results ==
=== Wai kru ===
==== 51 kg ====
13 November

Rank	Athlete	Score
1st place, gold medalist(s)	Boonnue Sowatee (THA)	93.8
2nd place, silver medalist(s)	Khamla Souphaphone (LAO)	84.6
3rd place, bronze medalist(s)	Dilshodbek Mirzaev (UZB)	78.8
4	Ochirbatyn Altanpürev (MGL)	73.6
5	Lam Man Chon (MAC)	69.0

==== 54 kg ====
14 November

==== 57 kg ====
18 November

Rank	Athlete	Score
1st place, gold medalist(s)	Raktha Mennoi (THA)	92.0
2nd place, silver medalist(s)	Langsanh Masopha (LAO)	85.0
3rd place, bronze medalist(s)	Sathish Kumar Mani (IND)	84.8
4	Bakhytzhan Khantemirov (KAZ)	53.4

==== 61 kg ====
15 November

Rank	Athlete	Score
1st place, gold medalist(s)	Sawai Atto (THA)	93.0
2nd place, silver medalist(s)	Varun Kumar Barnwal (IND)	81.0
3rd place, bronze medalist(s)	Cheong Long (MAC)	78.0
4	Nurtay Yesbolsynov (KAZ)	67.0
5	Talal Anaqreh (JOR)	0.0

==== 66 kg ====
15 November

==== 71 kg ====
16 November

==== 75 kg ====
16 November

Rank	Athlete	Score
1st place, gold medalist(s)	Umidjon Hatamov (UZB)	86.4
2nd place, silver medalist(s)	Vinay Kumar (IND)	83.4
3rd place, bronze medalist(s)	Riadh Mohammed (IRQ)	76.6
4	Jad Al-Wahash (JOR)	68.0
5	Almas Kassenov (KAZ)	38.4

==== 86 kg ====
16 November

Rank	Athlete	Score
1st place, gold medalist(s)	Billy Alumno (PHI)	86.8
2nd place, silver medalist(s)	Mohammed Kadhim (IRQ)	79.8
3rd place, bronze medalist(s)	Ali Al-Tamari (JOR)	66.0

=== Combat ===
==== 51 kg ====
Quarterfinals; 13 November
Lam Man Chon (MAC)	57
Khurshid Eshankhodjaev (UZB)	60
Ochirbatyn Altanpürev (MGL)	58
Albert Kujur (IND)	59
Chan Kai Chung (HKG)	58
Bounngieam Sovo Rasing (LAO)	59

Semifinals
Surasak Sansang (THA)	60
Khurshid Eshankhodjaev (UZB)	57
Albert Kujur (IND)
Bounngieam Sovo Rasing (LAO)	RSCO

Final; 18 November
Surasak Sansang (THA)	60
Bounngieam Sovo Rasing (LAO)	57

==== 54 kg ====
Quarterfinals; 13 November
Almas Sakayev (KAZ)	60
Sherzod Sharipov (UZB)	57
Kamal Singh Thakur (IND)
Phanvilay Rattanabounmy (LAO)	RSC
Ismail Moein (JOR)	60
Cheong Fu Man (MAC)	57

Semifinals
Veerapol Kwangkwang (THA)	59
Almas Sakayev (KAZ)	58
Phanvilay Rattanabounmy (LAO)	60
Ismail Moein (JOR)	57

Final; 18 November
Veerapol Kwangkwang (THA)	60
Phanvilay Rattanabounmy (LAO)	57

==== 57 kg ====
- Kittipong Uamsamang of Thailand originally won the gold medal, but was disqualified after he tested positive for Furosemide.

==== 61 kg ====
Quarterfinals; 14 November
Yoshihiro Ohara (JPN)	56
Mavlonbek Kahhorov (UZB)	60
Ahmad Rajabi (IRI)	58
Nurtay Yesbolsynov (KAZ)	59
Kowit Tabtub (THA)	60
Mak Chong Man (MAC)	56

Semifinals
Talal Anaqreh (JOR)
Mavlonbek Kahhorov (UZB)	RSCO
Nurtay Yesbolsynov (KAZ)	Prot.
Kowit Tabtub (THA)

Final; 18 November
Mavlonbek Kahhorov (UZB)	60
Nurtay Yesbolsynov (KAZ)	57

==== 71 kg ====
Quarterfinals; 14 November
Lei Wai Un (MAC)	57
Michihito Abe (JPN)	60
Dias Kassenov (KAZ)	59
Mostafa Abdollahi (IRI)	58

Semifinals
Mohammad Al-Failakawi (KUW)	RSCO
(IND)
Michihito Abe (JPN)	55
Dias Kassenov (KAZ)	60

Final; 18 November
Mohammad Al-Failakawi (KUW)
Dias Kassenov (KAZ)	RSCO

==== 75 kg ====
Quarterfinals
Yuki Matsuzaki (JPN)
Vahid Roshani (IRI)

Semifinals
Harully Asatullaev (UZB)	58
Almas Kassenov (KAZ)	59
Billy Alumno (PHI)
Vahid Roshani (IRI)	RSCO

Final; 18 November
Almas Kassenov (KAZ)	59
Vahid Roshani (IRI)	58

==== 79 kg ====
Semifinals		Final; 18 November
		Jad Al-Wahash (JOR)	RSCO
(IND)		Riadh Mohammed (IRQ)
Riadh Mohammed (IRQ)	RSCO

==== 86 kg ====
Semifinals		Final; 18 November
		Ali Al-Tamari (JOR)	57
Mohammed Kadhim (IRQ)	57	Abdolvahab Maroufi (IRI)	60
Abdolvahab Maroufi (IRI)	60
