= 2005 Asian Indoor Games =

International multi-sport event

I Asian Indoor Games
- Slogan: "Dawn of the Asian Stars"
- Host city: Bangkok, Thailand
- Nations: 37
- Athletes: 2,343
- Events: 120 in 9 sports
- Opening: November 12
- Closing: November 19
- Opened by: Vajiralongkorn; Crown Prince of Thailand
- Torch lighter: Somluck Kamsing
- Main venue: Hua Mark Indoor Stadium
- Website: baigoc2005.com

The 1st Asian Indoor Games were held in Bangkok, Thailand from November 12 to 19, 2005.

== Venues ==
=== Bangkok ===
- Indoor Stadium Huamark – Dancesport
- Thai-Japanese Stadium – Futsal
- Nimibutr Stadium – Indoor cycling
- The Mall Bangkapi – Sepak takraw
- Huamark Sports Complex – Short course swimming

=== Phuket ===
- Saphan Hin Sports Complex – Aerobic gymnastics, Muaythai

=== Suphanburi ===
- Suphanburi X-Games Sports Stadium – Extreme sports
- Suphanburi Sports Complex – Sport climbing

=== Pattaya ===
- Indoor Athletics Stadium – Indoor athletics

== Emblem ==
The logo of the 1st Asian Indoor Games itself comprises 9 sparkling stars that represent the opinions of the Asian people at large:

1. Spirit and soul of mankind
2. Sporting spirit
3. Creation of friendship
4. Building good physical appearances
5. Inspiration
6. Creative thinking
7. Solidarity
8. Peacefulness
9. Human freedom

The sun is the symbol of the Olympic Council of Asia. The redline, the blue line and the golden line forming like an "A" shape, together with a Thai roof, represent the Asian continent and the Asian Games. The golden line that resembling Thai smile, expressing a warm welcome to visitors.

== Mascot ==

Each sport discipline is animated with an elephant, thus giving the appearance of its cartoon movements in all events to be competed in the 1st Asian Indoor Games 2005. Children and other people alike will be fond of them, pleasant to look at them and keeping them for a souvenir after the end of the Games.

The blue and athletic elephant was named Hey and the yellow and plump one was Há. They were to convey the meaning of amusement, merriment and relaxation, thus in a way reflecting the natures of the Asian Indoor Games a great deal.

== Participating nations ==
There are 37 Asian countries confirmed to participate in the game.

- Bahrain
- Cambodia
- China
- Chinese Taipei (12)
- Hong Kong (34)
- India
- Indonesia
- Iran (47)
- Iraq
- Japan
- Jordan
- Kazakhstan
- Kuwait
- Kyrgyzstan
- Laos
- Lebanon
- Macau
- Malaysia (24)
- Maldives
- Mongolia
- Myanmar
- Nepal
- North Korea
- Oman
- Pakistan
- Philippines
- Qatar (22)
- Singapore
- South Korea
- Sri Lanka
- Syria
- Thailand
- Turkmenistan
- United Arab Emirates
- Uzbekistan
- Vietnam
- Yemen

== Sports ==
- Aerobic gymnastics (4)
- Dancesport (12)
- Extreme sports
  - BMX freestyle (3)
  - Roller freestyle (3)
  - Skateboarding (2)
  - Sport climbing (4)
- Futsal (2)
- Indoor athletics (26)
- Indoor cycling (5)
- Muaythai (17)
- Sepak takraw (2)
- Short course swimming (40)

== Calendar ==
OC	Opening ceremony	●	Event competitions	1	Event finals	CC	Closing ceremony

November 2005		10th Thu	11th Fri	12th Sat	13th Sun	14th Mon	15th Tue	16th Wed	17th Thu	18th Fri	19th Sat	Gold medals
Ceremonies				OC							CC	
Aerobic gymnastics								2	2			4
Dancesport						6	6					12
Extreme sports	BMX freestyle						●	2	1			3
Extreme sports	Roller freestyle						●	1	2			3
Extreme sports	Skateboarding							1	1			2
Extreme sports	Sport climbing					●	●	4				4
Futsal		●	●	●	●	●	●	1	1			2
Indoor athletics					4	9	13					26
Indoor cycling						2	2		1			5
Muaythai					1	1	2	3		10		17
Sepak takraw							●	●	●	2		2
Short course swimming					8	8	8	8	8			40
Total gold medals					13	26	31	22	16	12		120
November 2005		10th Thu	11th Fri	12th Sat	13th Sun	14th Mon	15th Tue	16th Wed	17th Thu	18th Fri	19th Sat	Gold medals

== Medal table ==
* Host nation (Thailand)

Rank	Nation	Gold	Silver	Bronze	Total
1	China (CHN)	24	19	14	57
2	Kazakhstan (KAZ)	23	15	6	44
3	Thailand (THA)*	18	21	34	73
4	Hong Kong (HKG)	12	9	5	26
5	India (IND)	7	3	8	18
6	Uzbekistan (UZB)	6	7	9	22
7	Chinese Taipei (TPE)	6	4	3	13
8	Japan (JPN)	6	2	6	14
9	South Korea (KOR)	5	7	10	22
10	Macau (MAC)	3	6	5	14
11	Iran (IRI)	3	5	2	10
12	Qatar (QAT)	2	2	2	6
13	Jordan (JOR)	1	1	4	6
14	Indonesia (INA)	1	1	2	4
15	Philippines (PHI)	1	0	2	3
16	Malaysia (MAS)	1	0	0	1
17	Singapore (SIN)	0	6	4	10
18	Laos (LAO)	0	5	2	7
19	Iraq (IRQ)	0	3	3	6
20	Kuwait (KUW)	0	2	3	5
21	Vietnam (VIE)	0	1	1	2
22	Pakistan (PAK)	0	1	0	1
22	Syria (SYR)	0	1	0	1
24	Kyrgyzstan (KGZ)	0	0	1	1
24	North Korea (PRK)	0	0	1	1
24	Oman (OMA)	0	0	1	1
Totals (26 entries)		119	121	128	368

Preceded by Inaugural	Asian Indoor Games; Bangkok; I Asian Indoor Games (2005)	Succeeded by Macau
