= Cycling at the 2005 Asian Indoor Games =

- Venue: Nimibutr Stadium; Suphanburi X-Games Sports Stadium
- Dates: 14–17 November 2005

Indoor cycling (Artistic cycling and Cycle ball) and BMX freestyle (as part of the extreme sports) at the 2005 Asian Indoor Games was held in Nimibutr Stadium, Bangkok, Thailand from 14 November to 17 November 2005.

== Medalists ==
=== BMX freestyle ===
Event	Gold	Silver	Bronze
Flatland	Kritsada Prathumma; Thailand	Pichit Worra-anan; Thailand	Lu Lei; China
Park	Kiattichai Wanitsakul; Thailand	Somsak Senglee; Thailand	Low Chi Siang; Singapore
Park best trick	Kiattichai Wanitsakul; Thailand	Chokchai Wanitsakul; Thailand	Khoo Boo Ann; Singapore

=== Indoor ===
Event	Gold	Silver	Bronze
Men's singles	Samuel Yu; Hong Kong	Wong Hang Cheong; Macau	Yu Pok Man; Hong Kong
Men's pair	Hong Kong; Lo Ting Hin; Samuel Yu	Hong Kong; Yu Pok Man; Li Tsz Yin	Macau; Antonio Jose Lou; Wong Hang Cheong
Women's singles	Kuan Sok Mui; Macau	Tsang Yu Sum; Hong Kong	Mui Ho Yee; Hong Kong
Women's pair	Hong Kong; Lo Wai Man; Mui Ho Yee	Macau; Vong Chi Kei; Kuan Sok Mui	Thailand; Amporn Kaewjinda; Rungrat Buakratok
Cycle ball	Japan; Taro Hashimoto; Tetsuro Kutsuwada	Hong Kong; Ho Wing Tai; Lo Man Fai	Thailand; Nopparit Buadum; Thunwa Naknava

== Medal table ==
Rank	Nation	Gold	Silver	Bronze	Total
1	Hong Kong (HKG)	3	3	2	8
1	Thailand (THA)	3	3	2	8
3	Macau (MAC)	1	2	1	4
4	Japan (JPN)	1	0	0	1
5	Singapore (SIN)	0	0	2	2
6	China (CHN)	0	0	1	1
Totals (6 entries)		8	8	8	24

== Results ==
=== BMX freestyle ===
==== Flatland ====
15–16 November

Rank	Athlete	Prel.	Final
1st place, gold medalist(s)	Kritsada Prathumma (THA)	78.33	82.67
2nd place, silver medalist(s)	Pichit Worra-anan (THA)	85.33	82.67
3rd place, bronze medalist(s)	Lu Lei (CHN)	67.17	71.67
4	Zhong Tengfei (CHN)	68.00	70.33
5	Ahmad Shaiful Aziz (MAS)	66.67	70.00
6	Ashler Lwi (SIN)	64.00	68.67
7	Fadli Kamal (MAS)	58.00	48.67
8	Lam Chi Keung (HKG)	49.83	45.67

==== Park ====
15–17 November

Rank	Athlete	Prel.	Final
1st place, gold medalist(s)	Kiattichai Wanitsakul (THA)	88.83	92.00
2nd place, silver medalist(s)	Somsak Senglee (THA)	85.00	87.00
3rd place, bronze medalist(s)	Low Chi Siang (SIN)	71.83	82.67
4	Ng Chee Keong (SIN)	78.67	82.67
5	Zafrin Shah Sabikin (MAS)	75.50	81.33
6	Cheng Pang-chung (TPE)	72.83	77.00
7	Armand Mariano (PHI)	71.83	72.67
8	Liang Lemin (CHN)	72.50	70.33
9	Tang Chi Hang (HKG)	68.50	70.00
10	Chen Haofeng (CHN)	64.00	62.00
11	Shahrulnizam Ahmad (MAS)	63.17	

==== Park best trick ====
16 November

Rank	Athlete	Score
1st place, gold medalist(s)	Kiattichai Wanitsakul (THA)	84.89
2nd place, silver medalist(s)	Chokchai Wanitsakul (THA)	75.78
3rd place, bronze medalist(s)	Khoo Boo Ann (SIN)	71.11
4	Chen Haofeng (CHN)	69.22
5	Danny Heng (SIN)	68.78
6	Armand Mariano (PHI)	67.11
7	Zafrin Shah Sabikin (MAS)	66.44
8	Liang Lemin (CHN)	63.89
9	Shahrulnizam Ahmad (MAS)	57.89
10	Cheng Pang-chung (TPE)	45.56

=== Indoor ===
==== Men's singles ====
14 November

Rank	Athlete	Score
1st place, gold medalist(s)	Samuel Yu (HKG)	311.30
2nd place, silver medalist(s)	Wong Hang Cheong (MAC)	304.60
3rd place, bronze medalist(s)	Yu Pok Man (HKG)	283.50
4	Thanaporn Jantarasakha (THA)	257.85
5	Antonio Jose Lou (MAC)	256.99
6	Ekkalak Khonchoho (THA)	252.15

==== Men's pair ====
15 November

Rank	Team	Score
1st place, gold medalist(s)	Hong Kong (HKG); Lo Ting Hin; Samuel Yu	282.43
2nd place, silver medalist(s)	Hong Kong (HKG); Li Tsz Yin; Yu Pok Man	260.34
3rd place, bronze medalist(s)	Macau (MAC); Antonio Jose Lou; Wong Hang Cheong	256.89
4	Thailand (THA); Thanaporn Jantarasakha; Ekkalak Khonchoho	234.00

==== Women's singles ====
14 November

Rank	Athlete	Score
1st place, gold medalist(s)	Kuan Sok Mui (MAC)	281.90
2nd place, silver medalist(s)	Tsang Yu Sum (HKG)	267.08
3rd place, bronze medalist(s)	Mui Ho Yee (HKG)	265.40
4	Rungrat Buakratok (THA)	241.88
5	Vong Chi Kei (MAC)	234.64
6	Amporn Kaewjinda (THA)	233.33

==== Women's pair ====
15 November

Rank	Team	Score
1st place, gold medalist(s)	Hong Kong (HKG); Lo Wai Man; Mui Ho Yee	253.75
2nd place, silver medalist(s)	Macau (MAC); Vong Chi Kei; Kuan Sok Mui	236.62
3rd place, bronze medalist(s)	Thailand (THA); Amporn Kaewjinda; Rungrat Buakratok	228.48
4	Macau (MAC); Yuen Wing See; Ieong On Kei	221.20

==== Cycle ball ====
===== Qualifying round =====
17 November

Pos	Team	Pld	W	D	L	GF	GA	GD	Pts	JPN	HKG	THA	MAC
1	Japan	3	3	0	0	24	6	+18	9	—	3–1	6–3	15–2
2	Hong Kong	3	2	0	1	19	8	+11	6	1–3	—	9–3	9–2
3	Thailand	3	1	0	2	17	16	+1	3	3–6	3–9	—	11–1
4	Macau	3	0	0	3	5	35	−30	0	2–15	2–9	1–11	—

Source: HKIC

===== Knockout round =====
Semifinals
17 November
Japan	21
Macau	0
17 November
Hong Kong	12
Thailand	1

Final
17 November
Japan	4
Hong Kong	2
Bronze medal match
17 November
Macau	0
Thailand	13
