= Maksym Petrenko (climber) =

Ukrainian rock climber (1978–2024)

Personal information
- Native name: Максим Петренко
- Born: 7 January 1978 Luhansk, Ukrainian SSR, USSR
- Died: 15 October 2024 (aged 46) Toretsk, Ukraine
- Occupation: Rock climber

Climbing career
- Type of climber: Competition climbing; Sport climbing
- Highest grade: Redpoint: 8c+ (5.14c)
Medal record
Men's competition climbing
Representing Ukraine
IFSC Climbing World Youth Championships
Silver medal – second place	1994 Leipzig	Youth A
Gold medal – first place	1997 Imst	Junior lead
IFSC Climbing World Championships
Bronze medal – third place	1999 Birmingham	Men's lead

Maksym Petrenko (Ukrainian: Максим Петренко; 7 January 1978 – 15 October 2024) was a Ukrainian rock climber and competition climber who specialised in competition lead climbing. Petrenko represented Ukraine in elite competition for 15 years, in both the junior and senior levels. He won a bronze medal at the 1999 IFSC Climbing World Championships in the lead climbing event. He was killed in battle during the Russian invasion of Ukraine.

== Biography ==
Petremko was born in Luhansk on 7 January 1978. Petrenko's competition climbing career spanned from 1992 to 2007 and he competed in the IFSC Climbing World Championships seven times. He was victorious at the 1997 IFSC Climbing World Youth ChampionshipsImst, and earned a bronze medal in the men's lead climbing event at the 1999 UIAA Climbing World Championships in Birmingham. His outdoor sport climbing allowed him to reach the grade of 8c+ (5.14c).

In 2024, Petrenko enlisted in the Ukrainian Armed Forces to fight in the Russian invasion of Ukraine. During combat in Toretsk, he was killed during mortar fire on 15 October 2024. He was 46.
