= Elnaz Rekabi =

Iranian climber

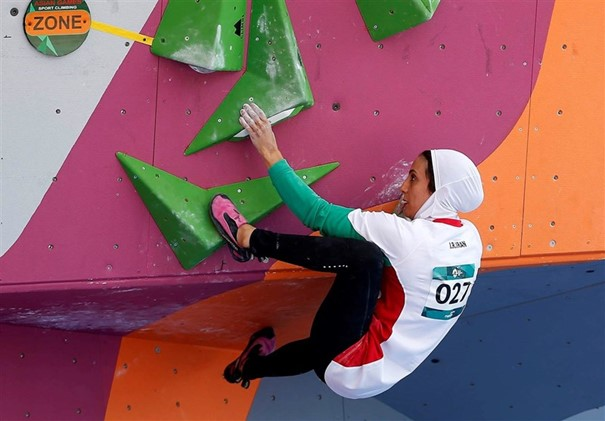
- Rekabi in 2019

Personal information
- Native name: الناز رکابی
- Nationality: Iran
- Born: 20 August 1989 (age 37) Zanjan, Iran
- Height: 161 cm (5 ft 3 in)

Climbing career
- Type of climber: Competition lead climbing; Competition bouldering; Competition speed climbing
Medal record
Women's competition climbing
Representing Iran
World Championships
| Bronze medal – third place | 2021 Moscow | Combined |
Asian Championships
| Silver medal – second place | 2013 Tehran | Bouldering |
| Bronze medal – third place | 2014 Lombok | Lead |
| Bronze medal – third place | 2016 Duyun | Speed relay |

Elnaz Rekabi (Persian: الناز رکابی Persian pronunciation: [elˈnɒːz ɾekɒːˈbiː]; born 20 August 1989) is an Iranian competition climber. She participated at the 2021 IFSC Climbing World Championships, being awarded the bronze medal in the women's combined event. Rekabi has also finished on the podium three times at the IFSC Climbing Asian Championships, with one silver and two bronze medals.

She made global headlines in 2022 when she violated Iran's mandatory hijab rule while participating in the 2022 IFSC Climbing Asian Championships in Seoul, South Korea. Occurring during the Mahsa Amini protests, it was widely interpreted as an intentional violation to signal support for the protests.

== Hijab controversy ==
In 2022, she participated in the 2022 IFSC Climbing Asian Championships in Seoul, South Korea, where she finished fourth. Notably, she appeared without Iran's mandatory hijab. The event occurred during the ongoing Mahsa Amini protests in Iran, a large element of which is resistance to and intentional violation of the obligatory hijab. On 18 October, two days after the competition, Rekabi was reported missing. The same day, a post was made on her Instagram account which claimed that she would explain everything at a news conference and that she was traveling back to Iran alongside her fellow team members. The post also claimed that her headscarf fell off inadvertently, and she had competed without it, due to bad timing and an unanticipated call for her to compete. BBC Persian reported that Rekabi's passport and mobile phone had been seized, and that her return flight from Seoul had been moved to depart a day earlier. On 19 October, Rekabi returned to Tehran, where, at Imam Khomeini International Airport, she reiterated her statement to state media before receiving a "hero's welcome" from cheering crowds chanting "Elnaz the champion", some of whom included unveiled women. Rekabi was reported to have waved to the crowd from inside a vehicle. Rekabi is believed to be the second Iranian female athlete to ever violate the Islamic Republic's hijab law during public competition (the first being Sadaf Khadem in 2019).

On 21 October, the BBC, citing an "informed source", stated that Rekabi was put under pressure in to make a "forced confession" following her return to Iran. According to the same source, Rekabi, after arriving at the airport, was "held at the national Olympics academy under the watch of plainclothes officers until she met the minister", referring to Iran's sports minister Hamid Sajjadi. The source claimed the authorities threatened to take her family's property if she did not agree to make the "forced confession", and that Rekabi was put under house arrest following her return to Iran. Iranian authorities, however, stated that she was at home "in need of rest".

Around 3 December, an unconfirmed video was distributed of Elnaz' medal-winning athlete brother Davood crying at a demolished house. The anonymous offscreen filmer says "This is the result of living in this country. A country's champion with kilos of medals for this country... They pepper-sprayed him and demolished a 39 sqm house and left." Iranian media confirmed that Rekabi's family house had been demolished, but said that the demolition had occurred prior to the September 16 hijab incident, and that the demolition was because the house lacked a valid construction permit.

== Personal life ==
On 13 January 2026, Rekabi supported the 2025–2026 Iranian protests by saying: "What war do you know in which 12,000 people were killed in just two days?"

== Awards and accolades ==
- 2022 Recognition as one of BBC's 100 inspiring and influential women

== See also ==
- Iranian protests against compulsory hijab
