= Park Ji-woo =

South Korean dancer

Park Ji-woo (Korean: 박지우, born December 6, 1980) is a South Korean dancer. He started dancing in sixth grade, and studied in British dancesport school. He won a silver medal in the rumba at the 2005 Asian Indoor Games and bronze medal in the five dances at the 2005 Asian Indoor Games with his older sister Park Ji-eun.

== Filmography ==
=== Television series ===
Year	Title	Role
2012	12 Signs of Love	Lee Kang-soo

=== Television shows ===
Year	Title	Role	Note
2011	Dancing with the Stars	himself	cast
2011–2012	Secret Date Show	himself	cast
2012	Diamond Girl Season 2	himself	cast
2013–2015	Dancing 9	himself	cast
2015	My Little Television	himself	Ep. 19–22
2016	King of Mask Singer	himself	Episode 43 as (I'm The One National)
2016	My Little Television	himself	Ep. 63–64
2021	Learn Way Season 2	himself, instructor	Ep. 2
