= Nattawut Pimpa =

Thai aerobic gymnast

Nattawut Pimpa (born 1986) is a Thai gymnast who is a member of the Aerobic Gymnastics National Thailand team, coached by Desislava Bogusheva (BUL).

Pimpa competed in the 2005, 2007 and 2011 Sea Games. He was a Gold medalist, amultiple World Cup medalist and participated at sixAerobic Gymnastics World Championships.

Pimpa is the first Thai gymnast to have an element named after him in the Aerobic Gymnastics Code of Points, awarded by Fédération Internationale de Gymnastique (FIG), with the highest possible score of 1.0 point per single gymnastics skill.

== World Championship results ==
At the 2012 Aerobic Gymnastics World Championships in Sofia, Bulgaria, Pimpa finished 13th in the men's individual qualification round with a score of 20.450 points. He also competed in the mixed pairs event, finishing 13th in qualification with 20.075 points.

At the 2014 World Championships in Cancún, Mexico, he placed 14th in men's individual qualification and 15th in mixed pairs qualification. In 2016, he competed in the group event at the World Championships in Incheon, South Korea, where his team finished sixth in the final with 20.475 points.
