= Sadaf Khadem =

Iranian boxer

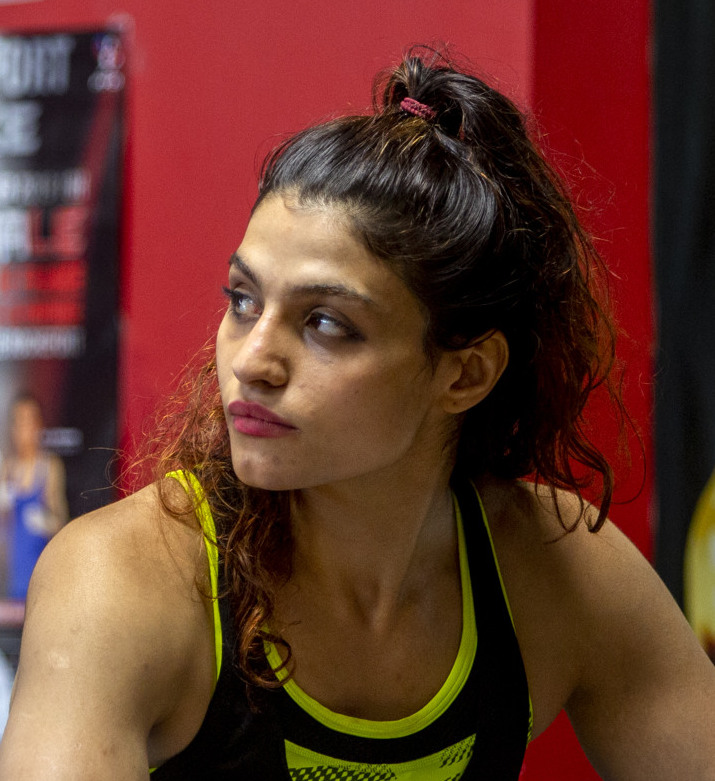
- Khadem in 2019
- Born: January 23, 1995 (age 31); Tehran, Iran
- Occupation: Boxer
- Boxing career

Boxing record
- Total fights: 1
- Wins: 1
- Losses: 0

Sadaf Khadem (Persian: صدف خادم; born January 23, 1995) is a female boxer from Iran. She held her first official fight on April 14, 2019, where she defeated Anne Chauvin from France. This fight meant she was the first Iranian woman to be part of an official boxing match.

Khadem and her trainer, Mahyar Monshipour, had been expected to return to Tehran after the win, but she canceled her return to Iran after an arrest warrant was issued due to breaching dress rules for women in Iran.

== Biography ==
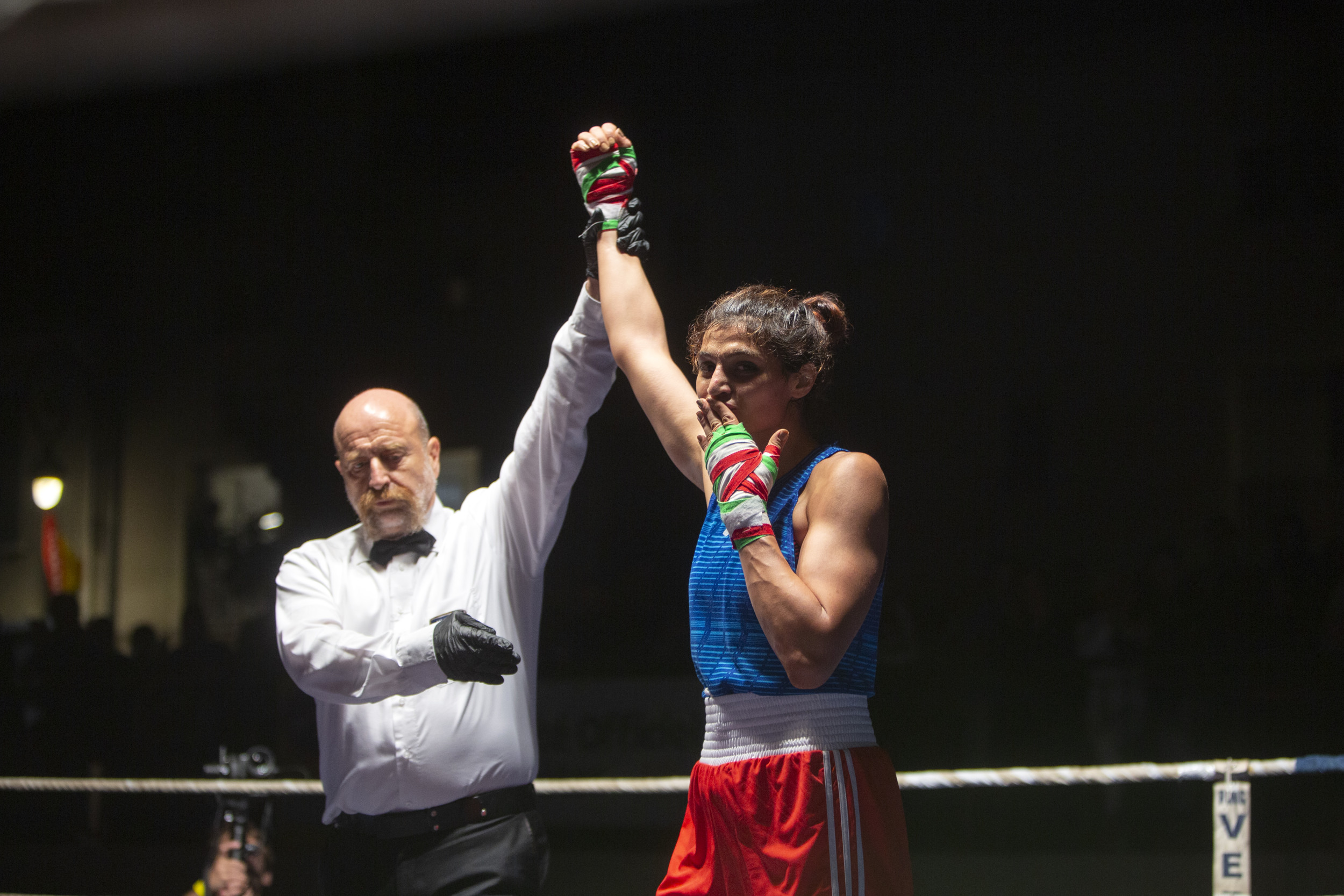
Sadaf Khadem in 2019.

Khadem began her athletic career at the age of nine, with an initial interest in basketball. After observing professional basketball players incorporating boxing into their training to improve their conditioning and morale, she decided to take up the sport herself. She began her training in Tehran and subsequently continued in Varamin, despite the long commute from her home. Although Khadem was accepted into a university program to pursue a degree in sports engineering, she eventually dropped out to focus on boxing full-time. Alongside her dedicated boxing regimen, she also participated in fitness and basketball classes.

Mahyar Monshipour became her boxing trainer in 2008. In 2014, she accepted an invitation to compete in an official boxing match in France, despite facing opposition from the Ministry of Sports of Iran.

== Defeating French Opponent ==
On April 14, 2019, Khadem participated in her first official match in Royan, France. Her opponent Anne Chauvin was a French boxer. Khadem defeated Chauvin at the end of a three-round match with Monshipour as her trainer.

After the match, Khadem embraced her opponent with tears in her eyes. She declared that "this victory belongs to all the men and women who sacrificed their lives for Iran." She further added that "this was the first step."

== Reception ==
The prospect of Khadem's match with Chauvin attracted French and other international media attention. The match was broadcast on a dedicated channel as well as several local ones. The match was dubbed by the hosts as "an effort to bring equality among women and men." Following Khadem's victory, the mayor of Royan congratulated Monshipour and Khadem inside the ring.

The Iranian Boxing Federation distanced itself from the match and released a statement reading:

As women's boxing is not a sanctioned sport of the Islamic Republic of Iran Boxing Federation, the organization, training, and participation in this sport is not related to this federation and it is the organizer and participant's responsibilities.

Following the match, Khadem and Monshipour had plans to return to Iran, however, lingering rumors of potential arrest warrants kept them in France. Khadem's representative told Reuters that authorities had issued arrest warrants against her and Monshipour. Hossein Soori, the head of Iran's boxing federation, denied Khadem would be arrested, attributing the information to “media linked to Saudi Arabia”.
