= Roypim Ngampeerapong =

Thai aerobic gymnast

- Born: January 18, 1989 (age 36); Bangkok, Thailand

Gymnastics career
- Discipline: Aerobic gymnastics

Roypim Ngampeerapong (born 18 January 1989) is a gymnast, member of the Aerobic Gymnastics National Thailand team. Coached by Desislava Bogusheva (BUL). She is known as the only Thai Gymnast in the history, awarded by the International Gymnastics Federation FIG as a "World Class Gymnast". Being a multiple World Cup medalist, she participated in five consecutive Aerobic Gymnastics World Championships during the period 2006 - 2014. Ngampeerapong won two gold medals at the Southeast Asian Games in 2007.

== Achievements ==
- 23rd Southeast Asian Games, Manila (PHI) 2005, Individual Woman 1st place
- 24th Southeast Asian Games, Korat (THA) 2007, Individual Woman 1st place, Mix Pair 1st place
- 11th Aerobic gymnastic World championship Rodez (FRA) 2010, Roypim Ngampeerapong qualified for the finals in Individual Woman category. She became the first gymnast in the history of Thailand to qualify for the World Championship's finals, which was awarded by the International Gymnastics Federation FIG with the title "World class gymnast"
- 9th The World Games Cali 2013 (COL), Roypim Ngampeerapong and Nattawut Pimpa marked the first ever participation of Thai gymnasts at the World Games. The qualification for the Games is based on the top eight athletes ranked from the previous World Championship.
- 13th Aerobic gymnastic World championship Cancun (MEX) 2014 - Roypim Ngmapeerapong scored the best ever result in the history of Thailand by ranking 5th in the Individual Woman category.
