= Lisa Cheng (bodybuilder) =

- Born: 17 February 1986 (age 39); British Hong Kong
- Occupations: TV Personality, Body Builder, Fitness Instructor, Entrepreneur, Actress
- Years active: 2006–present
- Spouse: Calvin Kong (m. 2013)

Chinese name
- Traditional Chinese: 鄭麗莎
- Simplified Chinese: 郑丽莎
Transcriptions

Lisa Cheng (Chinese name: 鄭麗莎, Cheng Lai-sho, born 17 February 1986) is a Hong Kong champion body builder and speed climber, known as 'Hong Kong's Spider Girl'.

== Career ==
She is a six-time winner of the Hong Kong Bodybuilding Championships, and a six-time winner of the Hong Kong Miss Body Fitness title, from 2006 to 2011. In 2010 she won the World Bodybuilding Championship, the first Hong Konger to do so.

As a member of the Hong Kong National Sport Climbing Team, she won the 2006 International Mountaineering and Climbing Federation Climbing World Cup, the first Chinese female champion in the world. At home, she was Hong Kong Women’s Speed Climbing Champion in every year from 2003 to 2011, as at 2011.

She has moved on to develop a multi-discipline career, including in martial arts. She is licensed as a coach in 10 disciplines, including fitness training, rock climbing, gymnastics, boxing, Muay Thai, aerobics and belly dancing.

Since 2008, she has been a television host and actress and has partnered with others and open her own fitness gym in Hong Kong.

== Personal life ==
Cheng was born and raised in Hong Kong. She grew up in a relatively low income family; and as a teenager would often sneak out of the house while her parents were asleep to hang out with her friends in bars. She was a lost teenager and wasn't extremely bad, but wanted to do what her friends were doing back then.

She began climbing, on a wall in a community centre, at age 12, when she found she had an innate skill for it.

At 19, she took a three-year diploma in sports management at the Hong Kong Institute of Vocational Education, followed by a bachelor's degree in the same field. She was quoted saying:

“I had a hard time catching up with my studies, I didn’t know much about English, plus the textbooks were extremely difficult for me. But I hate to start something without finishing it. Once I choose a road, I must walk until the end.”

After three years’ studying, she managed to graduate ‘with medium scores and no fails’.

Outside of competitions, she is a personal trainer and part-time physical education lecturer at the Hong Kong Institute of Vocational Education.

On September 20, 2013, she married her boyfriend after two years - Calvin Kong. Their marriage was held in Guam. They have four children: a son, Tommy, born on 1 October 2014, followed by triplets - a son, Jeremy, and two daughters, Euphy and Yuka - delievered on 11 August 2016.

== Filmography and Theater Act ==
- All's Well Ends Well 2009 (2009) (film, actor: Kuen)
- Black Ransom (2010) (film, extra/stunt actor)
- Beating the Classroom (2011) (theater, non-verbal physical comedy)
- The Constable (2013) (film, actor)
- Dot 2 Dot (2014) (film, actor)
- Buddy Cops (2016) (film, actor)
- Lady Bloodfight (2016) (film, actor)
- Agent Mr Chan (2018)
- We Are Legends (2019)
