= Japan at the 2005 Asian Indoor Games =

- IOC code: JPN
- NOC: Japanese Olympic Committee
- Website: www.joc.or.jp

in Bangkok, Thailand November 12 - November 19
- Competitors: 30
- Medals Ranked 8th: Gold 6 Silver 2 Bronze 6 Total 14

Asian Indoor Games appearances
- 2005; 2007; 2009; 2013; 2017; 2021; 2025

Japan competed at the 2005 Asian Indoor Games held in Bangkok, Thailand from November 12, 2005, to November 19, 2005. Japan finished eighth with 6 gold medals, 2 silver medals, and 6 bronze medals.

== Medal summary ==
=== Medal table ===
| Sport | Gold | Silver | Bronze | Total |
|---|---|---|---|---|
| Dancesport | 5 | 1 | 3 | 9 |
| Cycling | 1 | 0 | 0 | 1 |
| Aerobic gymnastics | 0 | 1 | 2 | 3 |
| Muaythai | 0 | 0 | 1 | 1 |
| Totals (4 entries) | 6 | 2 | 6 | 14 |

=== Medalists ===
| Medal | Name | Sport | Event | Date |
|---|---|---|---|---|
| Gold | Ryo Yoshikawa; Nao Shirai | Dancesport | Quickstep | November 14 |
| Gold | Takeo Wachi; Kiriko Wachi | Dancesport | Slow foxtrot | November 14 |
| Gold | Kazuki Sugaya; Ikuyo Ozaki | Dancesport | Waltz | November 14 |
| Gold | Masaki Seko; Chiaki Seko | Dancesport | Latino five dances | November 14 |
| Gold | Masaki Seko; Chiaki Seko | Dancesport | Latino jive | November 15 |
| Gold | Taro Hashimoto; Tetsuro Kutsuwada | Cycling | Cycle ball | November 17 |
| Silver | Kazuki Sugaya; Ikuyo Ozaki | Dancesport | Five dances | November 15 |
| Silver | Asami Takeuchi | Aerobic gymnastics | Women's individual | November 16 |
| Bronze | Akira Ito; Yukiko Miyamoto | Dancesport | Tango | November 14 |
| Bronze | Ryo Yoshikawa; Nao Shirai | Dancesport | Viennese waltz | November 14 |
| Bronze | Takeo Wachi; Kiriko Wachi | Dancesport | Five dances | November 15 |
| Bronze | Takeo Higuchi; Yoshiko Higuchi | Aerobic gymnastics | Mixed team | November 16 |
| Bronze | Yasutake Deguchi | Aerobic gymnastics | Men's individual | November 17 |
| Bronze | Michihito Abe | Muaythai | Men's light middleweight | November 18 |
